= Israel–Palestine Liberation Organization letters of recognition =

Part of the Oslo I Accord in 1993

The Letters of Mutual Recognition were exchanged between Israel and the Palestine Liberation Organization (PLO) on 9 September 1993. In their correspondence, Israeli prime minister Yitzhak Rabin and Palestinian president Yasser Arafat agreed to begin cooperating towards a peaceful solution to the Israeli–Palestinian conflict. The PLO recognized Israel's right to exist in peace, renounced Palestinian militancy and terrorism, and accepted UNSC Resolution 242 and UNSC Resolution 338. Israel recognized the PLO as a legitimate authority representing the Palestinian people and agreed to commence comprehensive negotiations for the Israeli–Palestinian peace process. These initial agreements between Rabin and Arafat laid the groundwork for the Oslo I Accord on 13 September 1993, effectively serving as its preamble.

== Correspondence ==
There were a total of three letters exchanged, with one letter from Palestinian political leader Yasser Arafat to Norwegian foreign minister Johan Jørgen Holst. The correspondences are shown below:

=== PLO to Israel: letter from Yasser Arafat to Yitzhak Rabin ===
September 9, 1993
Yitzhak Rabin
Prime Minister of Israel
Mr. Prime Minister,
The signing of the Declaration of Principles marks a new era in the history of the Middle East. In firm conviction thereof, I would like to confirm the following PLO commitments:
The PLO recognizes the right of the State of Israel to exist in peace and security.
The PLO accepts United Nations Security Council Resolutions 242 and 338.
The PLO commits itself to the Middle East peace process, and to a peaceful resolution of the conflict between the two sides and declares that all outstanding issues relating to permanent status will be resolved through negotiations.
The PLO considers that the signing of the Declaration of Principles constitutes a historic event, inaugurating a new epoch of peaceful coexistence, free from violence and all other acts which endanger peace and stability. Accordingly, the PLO renounces the use of terrorism and other acts of violence and will assume responsibility over all PLO elements and personnel in order to assure their compliance, prevent violations and discipline violators.
In view of the promise of a new era and the signing of the Declaration of Principles and based on Palestinian acceptance of Security Council Resolutions 242 and 338, the PLO affirms that those articles of the Palestinian Covenant which deny Israel's right to exist, and the provisions of the Covenant which are inconsistent with the commitments of this letter are now inoperative and no longer valid. Consequently, the PLO undertakes to submit to the Palestinian National Council for formal approval the necessary changes in regard to the Palestinian Covenant.
Sincerely,
Yasser Arafat
Chairman
The Palestine Liberation Organization

=== PLO to Norway: letter from Yasser Arafat to Johan Jørgen Holst ===
September 9, 1993
His Excellency
Johan Jørgen Holst
Foreign Minister of Norway
Dear Minister Holst,
I would like to confirm to you that, upon the signing of the Declaration of Principles, the PLO encourages and calls upon the Palestinian people in the West Bank and Gaza Strip to take part in the steps leading to the normalization of life, rejecting violence and terrorism, contributing to peace and stability and participating actively in shaping reconstruction, economic development and cooperation.
Sincerely,
Yasser Arafat
Chairman
The Palestine Liberation Organization

=== Israel to PLO: letter from Yitzhak Rabin to Yasser Arafat ===
September 9, 1993
Yasser Arafat
Chairman
The Palestine Liberation Organization.
Mr. Chairman,
In response to your letter of September 9, 1993, I wish to confirm to you that, in light of the PLO commitments included in your letter, the Government of Israel has decided to recognize the PLO as the representative of the Palestinian people and commence negotiations with the PLO within the Middle East peace process.
Sincerely,
Yitzhak Rabin
Prime Minister of Israel

== Documents of the Oslo Accords ==
Additional cooperative documents signed between Israel and the PLO in light of the Oslo Accords:

- Protocol on Economic Relations (29 April 1994)
- Agreement on the Gaza Strip and the Jericho Area (4 May 1994)
- 1994 Washington Declaration (25 July 1994)
- Agreement on Preparatory Transfer of Powers and Responsibilities Between Israel and the PLO (29 August 1994)
- Protocol on Further Transfer of Powers and Responsibilities (27 August 1995)
- Protocol Concerning the Redeployment in Hebron (17 January 1997)
- Wye River Memorandum (23 October 1998)
- Sharm el-Sheikh Memorandum (4 September 1999)
- Taba Summit (27 January 2001)
