= Palestinian clearance funds held by Israel =

Palestinian clearance funds are revenues belonging to the Palestinian Authority that are held by Israel. These funds consist of taxes, fees, and customs duties imposed on goods and merchandise imported into Palestine, or transiting through Israel and border crossings, in accordance with the Oslo Accords.

== Description ==
These are funds collected monthly by the Israeli Ministry of Finance on behalf of the Palestinian Authority and then transferred to the Palestinian Ministry of Finance and Treasury.

== Clearance Rate ==
The clearance rate, including taxes and revenues, ranges between 700 and 800 million shekels per month, with a 3% commission fee deducted by Israel at the end of each month.

== Importance of Clearance Funds ==
- These funds are primarily used to pay salaries of public employees.
- They constitute a significant portion of the Palestinian Authority’s income.
- They help cover expenses and finance essential government services across various sectors in the Palestinian state.

== See also ==
- Protocol on Economic Relations
- Taxation in Palestine
- Oslo Accords
