= Sharm El Sheikh Memorandum =

1999 memorandum between Israeli and the PLO

The Sharm El Sheikh Memorandum, full name: The Sharm El Sheikh Memorandum on Implementation Timeline of Outstanding Commitments of Agreements Signed and the Resumption of Permanent Status Negotiations, was a memorandum signed on September 4, 1999, by Prime Minister of Israel Ehud Barak and PLO Chairman Yasser Arafat at Sharm el Sheikh in Egypt, overseen by the United States represented by Secretary of State Madeleine Albright. The memorandum was witnessed and co-signed by President Hosni Mubarak of Egypt and King Abdullah of Jordan.

== Purposes ==
The memorandum's purpose was to implement the Interim Agreement on the West Bank and the Gaza Strip (Oslo II) of September 1995 and to implement all other agreements between the PLO and Israel since September 1993: Protocol on Economic Relations (1994); Agreement on the Gaza Strip and the Jericho Area (1994); Washington Declaration (1994); Agreement on Preparatory Transfer of Powers and Responsibilities Between Israel and the PLO (1994); Protocol on Further Transfer of Powers and Responsibilities (1995); Wye River Memorandum (1998).

To sum up the memorandum:

In an effort to break the deadlocked Israel-PA negotiations, the parties met in Sharm El Sheikh in the presence of Secretary Albright, President Mubarak and King Abdullah, and signed an agreement which called for the Israeli withdrawal from a further 11% of the West Bank; the release of 350 Palestinian prisoners; the opening of safe passages between the West Bank and Gaza; and a seaport to be built in Gaza. There was also a timetable for final status talks to deal with Jerusalem, borders, refugees and settlements. A framework agreement on permanent status (FAPS) was to be achieved by February 2000 and permanent agreement by September 2000.

== Redeployments ==
The two sides agreed to resume Permanent Status negotiations to reach a Permanent Status Agreement. They reaffirmed that negotiations on the Permanent Status would lead to the implementation of Security Council Resolutions 242 and 338. Both sides agreed to make a determined effort to conclude a framework agreement and established a timetable to achieve this goal.

Israel and Palestine agreed on a number of Israeli redeployments.

(Note: Area A - Full control of the Palestinian Authority.

Area B - Palestinian civil control, Israeli military control.

Area C - Full Israeli control.)

1. On September 5, 1999, to transfer 7% from Area C to Area B.
1. On November 15, 1999, to transfer 2% from Area B to Area A and 3% from Area C to Area B.
1. On January 20, 2000, to transfer 1% from Area C to Area A, and 5.1% from Area B to Area A.

== Other stipulations ==
- Various committees to monitor redeployments and the return to civilian life.
- Safe passage routes and crossing points.
- A high level Joint Liaison Committee, which would convene no later than September 13, 1999 to review the situation in the Tomb of the Patriarchs / Al Haram Al Ibrahimi

The memorandum states that neither side would initiate or take any step that would change the status of the West Bank and the Gaza Strip in accordance with the Interim Agreement. This clause recognized the necessity to create an appropriate environment for negotiations,

Israeli and Palestinian negotiators also discussed various issues:

- Needs for the peaceful and normal functioning of the Gaza sea port and airport.
- The release of Palestinian prisoners from Israeli military jails.
- Anti-terrorism security. Both sides affirmed they would act swiftly against any threat or act of terrorism, violence or incitement, whether committed by Palestinians or Israelis.

Palestine and Israel also called upon the international donor community to enhance its financial support for the Palestinian economic development and the Israeli-Palestinian peace process.
