= Taxation in Palestine =

As of 2016, taxation in the State of Palestine is subject to the Oslo Accords, notably the Protocol on Economic Relations also called the Paris Protocol, which was signed in 1994 by the Palestine Liberation Organization (PLO) and Israel. The Paris Protocol established a customs union, which essentially formalized the existing situation, where the Palestinian economy was merged into the Israeli one. Formally, the Palestinian Authority (PA) is entitled to collect taxes from the Palestinians in the Palestinian territories, but some 75% of PA's total tax revenue was as of 2014 collected by Israel on behalf of the PA and transferred to the PA on a monthly basis. Israel has occasionally withheld the taxes it owes the PA.

== Background ==
Until 1967, the West Bank was subject to the Jordanian system of taxation, while Gaza to the Egyptian. Neither territory had previously had economic ties with Israel. After Israel occupied these territories, economic relations with the former rulers were cut and Israel partially integrated the territories into its own economic structures in the form of an incomplete customs union. Israel’s labour market was opened to Palestinian workers, and in 1972 one out of four Palestinian workers was employed in Israel. Military Order 31 of 27 June 1967 assigned all powers of taxation to an Israeli official appointed by the Area Commander. Israel adopted the Jordanian Income Tax Law of 1964 to levy taxes on Palestinians in the West Bank, while making notable changes to its tax rate intervals, but applied Israeli tax laws to Israeli Jews living in settlements there. Under the Jordanian system the highest tax rate of 55% started with incomes of 8,000 dinars. The Israeli authorities altered the rates so that by 1988 this applied to Palestinians earning 5,231 JD (equal to 24,064 Israeli shekels, whereas in Israel the 48% rate only applied to Israeli wage earners earning approximately twice as much (45,600 shekels). This did not affect Israeli West Bank settlers, who taxed at the lower rates effective in Israel. (Note: "This paper has demonstrated that the West Bank wage earner pays significantly more taxes as a percentage of income than a similarly stationed Israeli wage earner.") Similarly the self-employed West Bankers appeared to pay more than their Israeli counterparts, but due to the different deductibility regimes, discrimination could not be ascertained.

Access to most public services in Israeli controlled territories is conditional on paying one's taxes, income, property and value-added (VAT) and fines. This system was legalized retroactively in December 1988 under military order. (Note: 'The first makes the acquisition of permits or licenses contingent upon proof of payment of income taxes, property taxes, and value-added taxes (VAT), not to mention a host of smaller taxes and fines imposed by the military courts and the Civil Administration.2 This practice, widespread throughout 1988, was "legalized" retroactively in the West Bank with Military Order No. 1262, issued on 17 December 1988. . . The second innovation is that before even applying for a permit a whole series of stamps must be obtained from various quarters and affixed to the application, which makes the process all the more difficult and expensive. Thus, applicants must obtain approval stamps from the tax department, the local police, the municipality or village head (usually a collaborator), the Village League (also made up of collaborators, the organization was disbanded as a regional force in 1985 but unofficially revived at the local level since the intifada), and the Shin Bet. Each exacts a fee. Applicants with prison records or debts outstanding are automatically filtered out. Even if all these conditions are met, there is no guarantee of success, which is entirely unpredictable; the authorities do not state reasons for their rejection of applications. To give an example of the arbitrary nature of the exercise, a university teacher who wanted to attend a conference in the U.S. in May 1989 succeeded, at considerable financial cost, in obtaining all the necessary stamps and then appeared before the permit official of the Civil Administration. The latter summarily tore up the application form with all the hard won stamps once he found out that the applicant was a lecturer at the local university. The teacher had to start from scratch, and eventually managed to obtain the coveted travel permit through.') (Note: 'Third, provision of most of the public services in the territories is conditional on the payment of taxes and a cumbersome bureaucratic process . . . All this has given rise to a drawn-out and cumbersome bureaucratic process. Even if things proceed smoothly, one is still required to stand in line at all the different government offices. If any kind of irregularity crops up – and this happens frequently under the circumstances of the Intifada and as a result of dependency on so many authorities – the entire process grinds to a halt. Then, in the best case, the applicant is lucky to simply not receive the service. In the worst scenario, the application triggers a series of consequences, such as restrictions on freedom of movement or source of livelihood.') Israel's taxation (Note: Only the top five deciles of Israel's population pay income tax, which means that Israeli Palestinians, like the ultra-orthodox Jews, being in a lower income bracket, with tax credits kicking in, have a far lower tax liability.) allows broad leeway and discretion, taking in norms of appeal and the taxpayer's rights. The draconian provisions of Section 194 of the Israeli Income Tax Ordinance, allowing taxation officers to assess what a taxpayer may owe while limiting challenges, and making them conditional on the prior payment of a bond, rarely applied in Israel, has been routine in the West Bank. (Note: 'In Israel, the Draconian section 194 is rarely applied, while in the territories it is exercised routinely, through the pertinent regulations, as a drastic measure of enforcement or punishment.') Likewise, imprisonment for tax offenses is uncommon in Israel but, according to Lazar, "in the territories it is used on a massive scale and for extensive periods of time." Palestinians deeply resented paying taxes on their business and commercial activities to the Occupation authority without receiving the same benefits Israeli taxpayers had in return. In the First Intifada, tax payments dropped 50%, and Israel responded by cutting health benefits.

In 1989, the relatively affluent entrepreneurial Christian town of Beit Sahour, in response to military repression organized a sumud-inspired non-violent boycott of Israeli consumer products in favour of Palestinian-Jordanian wares, and shortly afterwards refused to pay taxes to the occupying power on the basis of the slogan "No taxation under Occupation", which was inspired by the "no taxation without representation" slogan used by Patriots during the American Revolution. They protested paying school taxes because under Israeli occupation as opposed to Jordanian rule they now had to pay for their education, and claimed tax monies received were not used to provide services but to cover the costs of IDF ammunition and tear gas fired at their children. As a result, the IDF placed the town under total curfew for 42 days, blocking food imports, cutting telephone lines, impounding private cars, arresting over forty community leaders, who received year-long gaol sentences, and confiscating cash and property found in house raids amounting to millions of dollars, and one period seizing $US 1,500,000 worth of goods from 300 families, including living room furniture, fridges and stereos which were then sold in Israel at auctions. Closures of schools, medical clinics and food supply chains continued for months after the curfew was lifted. The revolt was crushed in nine months.

== Paris Protocol ==
In 1994, the PLO and Israel signed the Gaza–Jericho Agreement and the annexed Protocol on Economic Relations (Paris Protocol), which created the Palestinian Authority, and established a customs union and the tax clearance system of the PA.

=== Taxes in PA areas ===
The PA imposes and collects taxes in the Areas A and B of the West Bank, but not in Area C, and in the Gaza Strip. In 2006, the PA directly collected in the West Bank Areas A and B approximately $35 million per month from taxes and other charges.

Under the Paris Protocol, the PA has no jurisdiction in Area C of the West Bank. Income taxes paid by settlers and Israeli soldiers living in West Bank Area C flow directly into the Israeli treasury. Institutions and businesses in the settlements are entitled to tax benefits, and pay taxes, including corporate taxes and water taxes, to the municipalities. Income taxes of Palestinian workers in the settlements are collected by Israel and remitted to the PA without any deductions.

=== Tax clearance ===
Under the tax clearance system, Israel collects taxes on behalf of the PA. It is the largest source of income of the PA, accounting for about 70-75% of the PA's total revenue. The taxes collected by Israel on behalf of the PA are:

- tariffs on Palestinian imports. In August 2012, Israel and the PA reached an agreement to tighten cooperation in an effort to increase Palestinian revenue and curb the black market trade between Israel and the Palestinian territories. Under the agreement, import taxes are calculated on the basis of actual transfers of goods at Israeli border crossings, replacing the previous practice of calculating such taxes on the basis of a declaration by importers that goods were intended for the Palestinian territories. Israel may unilaterally establish and change tariff rates.
- Israel collects a value added tax (VAT) on goods and services sold in Israel. Israel remits to the PA that portion of the VAT on goods actually transferred to the Palestinian territories. The Protocol requires the PA to vary its VAT rate to match Israel’s VAT rate.
- Israel collects income taxes as well as some insurance fees deducted from the wages of Palestinians employed in Israel and the Israeli settlements. Pursuant to the Protocol, Israel retains 25% of the income taxes on wages earned by Palestinians in Israel, but not from Palestinians employed in the settlements, and the balance is remitted to the PA.

Israel may retain 3% of the total revenue collected by it as collection and processing fees. Taxes collected by Israel are transferred to the PA on a monthly basis.

In 2006, Israel collected about $50 million of PA taxes per month. In December 2012, the amount was put at some $100 million a month. In 2014–2015, the amount was about $160 million per month. The PA's self-generated revenue collected by Israel was about 70–75% of the PA’s total revenue.

=== Withholding transfers by Israel ===
Because of the large proportion of taxes in the PA's budget collected by Israel, the PA is vulnerable to unilateral suspensions by Israel of transfers of clearance revenue. As early as 1997, Israel began to unilaterally settle bills unpaid by Palestinians, not the PA itself, including fines and interest. Political reasons for suspension varied from Palestinian violence to the election of Hamas into PA, reconciliation between Fatah and Hamas and the demand for international recognition. Israel has suspended hundreds of millions of dollars for accumulated periods of some 4 years. While Israel Electric Corporation unilaterally issues excessive late payment penalties and interest charges, Israel did not pay interest on money it did not transfer to the PA.

In July 2018, the PA Finance Ministry said that Israel was deducting NIS 120 million (about US$30 million) each month to cover the costs of electricity and water that Israel supplies to the Palestinian territories, in addition to medical treatment Palestinians receive in Israeli hospitals. Israel was also proposing to withhold the amount that the PA pays to security prisoners and their families, which total NIS 100 million a month. In June 2019, the PA stopped all payments to Israel Electric Corporation (IEC), when its debts stood to IEC at ILS 2.0 billion (about US$540 million). In August, with PA agreement, ILS 300 million was deducted from taxes that had been withheld by Israel for the PA and applied against the PA debt to IEC. On 8 September, the debt was ILS 1.7 billion (about US$460 million) and IEC gave notice of its intention to cut power. Two months earlier the Supreme Court of Israel ruled that IEC must give 35 days notice before it can cut off electricity.

Israel has suspended transfers of Palestinian taxes on a number of occasions, including:

- 1997: transfers suspended for two months after a bombing in Jerusalem.
- 2000: transfers suspended for two years after the start of the Second Intifada.
- 2006: transfers suspended for more than a year following the 2006 Palestinian legislative election that brought Hamas to power in the PA.
- June 2008: Israel retained a large part of the taxes in an apparent retaliation for PA Prime Minister Salam Fayyad's lobbying at the European Union not to upgrade the Israel–European Union relations.
- May 2011: transfers suspended after the Fatah–Hamas reconciliation agreement.
- October and November 2011: transfers suspended following Palestine's bid for full membership in the United Nations and admission to UNESCO.
- December 2012: transfers of $100 million suspended in response to Palestine securing an upgraded status in the UN pursuant to United Nations General Assembly resolution 67/19. Foreign Minister Avigdor Lieberman said that "The Palestinians can forget about getting even one cent in the coming four months". The withheld money were used to pay Palestinian debts to the Israel Electric Corporation and to the Israeli water authority (Mekorot). The Foreign Affairs Council of the Council of the European Union released a statement calling on Israel to "avoid any step undermining the financial situation of the Palestinian Authority" and stating that "Contractual obligations, notably under the [Protocol on Economic Relations], regarding full, timely, predictable and transparent transfer of tax and custom revenues have to be respected." On 9 December 2012, Mahmud Abbas warned he may refer Israel to the International Criminal Court (ICC) if it continues to withhold tax revenues at a meeting of the Arab League at which other members agreed to make up the shortfall in revenues.
- April 2014: Israel deducted an amount for debts owed by Palestinians to Israeli companies following the April 2014 Gaza Agreement.
- December 2015 — April 2015: transfers suspended after Palestine submitted a declaration accepting the jurisdiction of the International Criminal Court over crimes committed in the Palestinian territories and acceded to the Rome Statute to become a states party to the Statute.
- February 2019: Israel implemented a law of July 2018 requiring the deduction and freezing of a sum equal to the amount paid by the PA in 2018 to the Palestinian Authority Martyrs Fund to pay Palestinians detained in Israel (including prisoners convicted of bombing and murder) as well as to their families and to released prisoners. ILS 500 million (about US$138 million) was frozen.
- August 2019: with PA agreement, ILS 300 million was deducted from taxes that had been withheld by Israel and applied against the PA debt to IEC, which reached ILS 2.0 billion (about US$540 million) in June 2019.
- May 2020: the PA refused to receive its tax revenues from Israel as part of its decision to suspend coordination with Israel in protest after an Israeli announcement of intention to annex large areas in the West Bank. The annexation plans were put on hold in August and, in December, the PA accepted the transfer of ILS 3.76 billion (US$1.14 billion), being all the due tax revenues.
- October 2023: The transfer of all tax revenue funds was suspended during the Gaza war.

== Sources ==
- El-Farra, Majed; MacMillen, Malcolm (January 2000). "External Constraints on Manufacturing Development in Israeli-Occupied Gaza". Middle Eastern Studies. 36 (1): 153–170. doi:10.1080/00263200008701302. JSTOR 4284056. S2CID 144822037.
- Baxendale, Sidney J. (Spring 1989). "Taxation of Income in Israel and the West Bank: A Comparative Study". Journal of Palestine Studies. 18 (3): 134–141. doi:10.2307/2537347. JSTOR 2537347.
- Graff, James A. (2015). "Targeting Children: Rights versus Realpolitik". In Kapitan, Tomis (ed.). Philosophical Perspectives on the Israeli-Palestinian Conflict (2nd ed.). Routledge. pp. 157–184. ISBN 978-1-317-46285-9.
- Hiltermann, Joost R. (Winter 1990). "Israel's Strategy to Break the Uprising". Journal of Palestine Studies. 19 (3): 87–98. doi:10.2307/2537415. JSTOR 2537415.
- Kårtveit, Bård (2014). Dilemmas of Attachment: Identity and Belonging among Palestinian Christians. Brill. ISBN 978-9-004-27639-0.
- Lazar, Hadara (February 1990). The system of taxation in the West Bank and Gaza Strip as an instrument for the enforcement of Authority during the Uprising (DOC). B'Tselem.
- Likhovski, Assaf (2017). Tax Law and Social Norms in Mandatory Palestine and Israel. Cambridge University Press. ISBN 978-1-316-82019-3.
- Makdisi, Saree (2010). Palestine Inside Out: An Everyday Occupation. W. W. Norton & Company. ISBN 978-0-393-06996-9.
- Pratt, David (2007). Intifada: Palestine and Israel - The Long Day of Rage. Casemate Publishers. ISBN 978-1-935-14999-6.
- Raheb, Mitri (1995). I Am a Palestinian Christian. Fortress Press. ISBN 978-1-451-41485-1.
- Williams, Daniel (1 November 1989). "Israelis Drop Efforts to Crush Arab Tax Revolt". Los Angeles Times.
- Ziai, Fatemeh (2013). "Human rights violations as an obstacle to economic development: restrictions on movement in the West Bank and the Gaza Strip". In Wright Jr, J.W. (ed.). The Political Economy of Middle East Peace: The Impact of Competing Trade Agendas. Routledge. pp. 128–152. ISBN 978-1-134-69013-8.
