= Oslo Accords =

1990s Israeli–Palestinian peace agreements

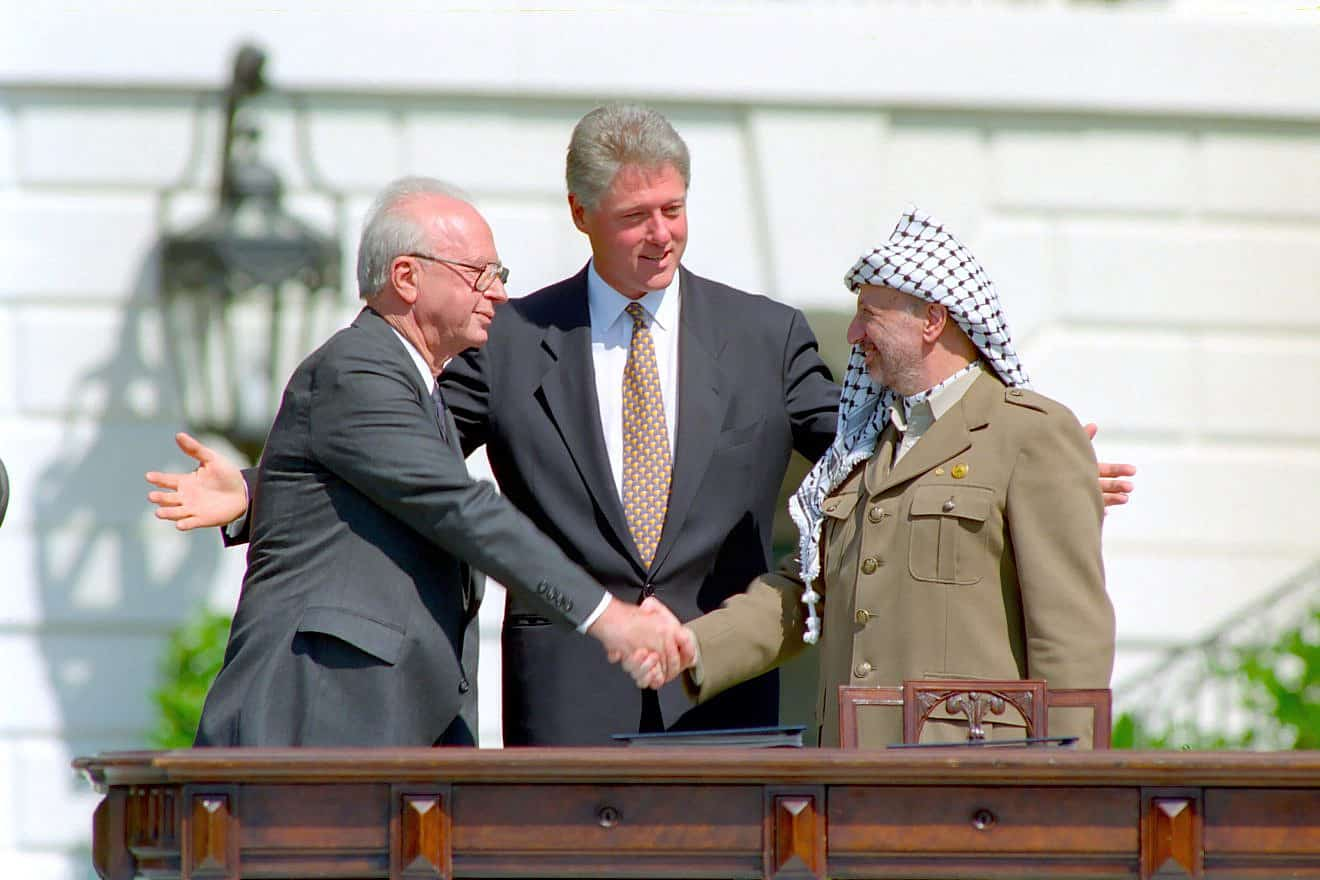
- Prime Minister of Israel Yitzhak Rabin (left) and President of Palestine Yasser Arafat (right) shake hands in the presence of United States president Bill Clinton (middle) at the White House in 1993
- Type: Bilateral negotiations
- Context: Israeli–Palestinian peace process
- Signed: 13 September 1993 (Declaration of Principles)
- Location: Washington, D.C. (Oslo I); Taba (Oslo II)
- Mediators: Norway
- Parties: Israel; PLO
- Language: English; Hebrew; Arabic

The Oslo Accords are a pair of interim agreements between Israel and the Palestine Liberation Organization (PLO): the Oslo I Accord, signed in Washington, D.C., in 1993; and the Oslo II Accord, signed in Taba, Egypt, in 1995. They marked the start of the Oslo process, a peace process aimed at achieving a peace treaty based on Resolution 242 and Resolution 338 of the United Nations Security Council. The Oslo process began after secret negotiations in Oslo, Norway, resulting in both the recognition of Israel by the PLO and the recognition by Israel of the PLO as the representative of the Palestinian people and as a partner in bilateral negotiations.

Among the notable outcomes of the Oslo Accords was the creation of the Palestinian Authority, which was tasked with the responsibility of conducting limited Palestinian self-governance over parts of the West Bank and the Gaza Strip; and the international acknowledgement of the PLO as Israel's partner in permanent-status negotiations about any remaining issues revolving around the Israeli–Palestinian conflict. Bilateral dialogue stems from questions related to the international border between Israel and a future Palestinian state: negotiations for this subject are centered around Israeli settlements, the status of Jerusalem, Israel's maintenance of control over security following the establishment of Palestinian autonomy, and the Palestinian right of return. The Oslo Accords did not create a definite Palestinian state.

A large portion of the Palestinian population, including various Palestinian militant groups, staunchly opposed the Oslo Accords; Palestinian-American academic Edward Said described them as a "Palestinian Versailles". The peace process was strained by the Cave of the Patriarchs massacre as well as by Hamas and Palestinian Islamic Jihad suicide bombings and attacks. Far-right Israelis also opposed the Oslo Accords, and Israeli prime minister Yitzhak Rabin was assassinated in 1995 by a right-wing Israeli extremist for signing them.

== Background ==
“We who have fought against you, the Palestinians, we say to you today, in a loud and a clear voice; Enough of blood and tears. Enough!”

— Rabin said on behalf of the Israeli people after the historical handshake with Yasser Arafat.

The Oslo Accords are based on the 1978 Camp David Accords and show therefore considerable similarity with those Accords. (Note: From the Framework for Peace in the Middle East, part of the 1978 Camp David Accords and blueprint for the Oslo Accords: Egypt and Israel agree that, ... there should be transitional arrangements for the West Bank and Gaza for a period not exceeding five years. In order to provide full autonomy to the inhabitants, under these arrangements the Israeli military government and its civilian administration will be withdrawn as soon as a self-governing authority has been freely elected by the inhabitants of these areas to replace the existing military government.; Egypt, Israel, and Jordan will agree on the modalities for establishing elected self-governing authority in the West Bank and Gaza. The delegations of Egypt and Jordan may include Palestinians from the West Bank and Gaza or other Palestinians as mutually agreed. The parties will negotiate an agreement which will define the powers and responsibilities of the self-governing authority to be exercised in the West Bank and Gaza. A withdrawal of Israeli armed forces will take place and there will be a redeployment of the remaining Israeli forces into specified security locations. The agreement will also include arrangements for assuring internal and external security and public order. A strong local police force will be established, which may include Jordanian citizens. In addition, Israeli and Jordanian forces will participate in joint patrols and in the manning of control posts to assure the security of the borders.; When the self-governing authority (administrative council) in the West Bank and Gaza is established and inaugurated, the transitional period of five years will begin. As soon as possible, but not later than the third year after the beginning of the transitional period, negotiations will take place to determine the final status of the West Bank and Gaza and its relationship with its neighbors and to conclude a peace treaty between Israel and Jordan by the end of the transitional period. These negotiations will be conducted among Egypt, Israel, Jordan and the elected representatives of the inhabitants of the West Bank and Gaza. (See JimmyCarterLibrary, The Framework for Peace in the Middle East (1978). Accessed December 2013)) The Camp David's "Framework for Peace in the Middle East" envisioned autonomy for the local, and only for the local, (Palestinian) inhabitants of West Bank and Gaza. At the time, there lived some 7,400 settlers in the West Bank (excluding East Jerusalem), and 500 in Gaza, with the number in the West Bank, however, rapidly growing. As Israel regarded the PLO as a terrorist organisation, it refused to talk with the sole representative of the Palestinian people. Instead, Israel preferred to negotiate with Egypt and Jordan, and "elected representatives of the inhabitants of the West Bank and Gaza".

While the final goal in Camp David was a "peace treaty between Israel and Jordan, taking into account the agreement reached in the final status of the West Bank and Gaza", the Oslo negotiations were directly between Israel and the PLO and aimed at a peace treaty directly between these groups. The Oslo Accords, like the 1978 Camp David Accords, merely aimed at an interim agreement that allowed first steps. This was intended to be followed by negotiation of a complete settlement within five years. When, however, an Israel–Jordan peace treaty was concluded on 26 October 1994, it was without the Palestinians.

== Negotiation partners ==
=== Mutual recognition of sides ===
Only after Israel's acceptance of the PLO as negotiation partner could serious negotiations start. In their Letters of Mutual Recognition of 9 September 1993, days before the signing of the Oslo I Accord, each party agreed to accept the other as a negotiation partner. The PLO recognized the State of Israel. Israel recognized the PLO as "the representative of the Palestinian people"; no more, no less.

=== Principal participants ===
Palestine Liberation Organization

- Yasser Arafat – PLO leader during the Oslo peace process
- Ahmed Qurei (a.k.a. Abu Ala) – PLO negotiator during the Oslo peace process

Israel

- Yossi Beilin – Israeli Deputy Foreign Minister negotiator during the Oslo peace process
- Yair Hirschfeld – Israeli negotiator during the Oslo peace process
- Shimon Peres – Israeli Foreign Minister during the Oslo peace process
- Ron Pundak – formed first Israeli negotiating team with Hirschfeld, before official Israeli involvement
- Yitzhak Rabin – Israeli Prime Minister during the Oslo peace process
- Uri Savir – former Director General of the Israeli Foreign Ministry, head of the Israeli negotiating team
- Joel Singer – Israeli lawyer and legal adviser for the Israeli Ministry of Foreign Affairs

Norway (facilitating)

- Jan Egeland – Norwegian Deputy Foreign Minister, provided political cover, facilities and finances for the negotiations
- Johan Jørgen Holst – Norwegian Minister of Foreign Affairs
- Terje Rød-Larsen – Norwegian facilitator during the negotiations
- Mona Juul – Norwegian facilitator during the negotiations

== The Oslo process ==
The Oslo process is the "peace process" that started in 1993 with secret talks between Israel and the PLO. It became a cycle of negotiations, suspension, mediation, restart of negotiations and suspension again. A number of agreements were reached, until the Oslo process ended after the failure of the Camp David Summit in 2000 and the outbreak of the Second Intifada.

During the Second Intifada, the Roadmap for Peace was proposed by the Quartet on the Middle East, and explicitly aimed at a two-state solution and the establishment of an independent Palestinian state. The Roadmap, however, soon entered a cycle similar to the Oslo process, but without producing any agreement.

=== Outline of the peace plan ===
Stated goals of the Oslo Accords were among other things, Palestinian interim Self-Government (not the Palestinian Authority (PA), but the Palestinian Legislative Council) and a permanent settlement of unresolved issues within five years, based on Security Council Resolutions 242 and 338. Although the agreements recognize the Palestinian "legitimate and political rights," they remain silent about their fate after the interim period. The Oslo Accords neither define the nature of the post-Oslo Palestinian self-government and its powers and responsibilities, nor do they define the borders of the territory it eventually would govern.

A core issue of the Oslo Accords was the withdrawal of the Israeli military from Palestinian territories. The plan was a withdrawal in phases and a simultaneous transfer of responsibilities to the Palestinian authorities for maintaining security. Oslo II, Article X.2 reads:

Further redeployments of Israeli military forces to specified military locations will commence after the inauguration of the Council and will be gradually implemented commensurate with the assumption of responsibility for public order and internal security by the Palestinian Police ...

And Article XI.2.e:

During the further redeployment phases to be completed within 18 months from the date of the inauguration of the Council, powers and responsibilities relating to territory will be transferred gradually to Palestinian jurisdiction that will cover West Bank and Gaza Strip territory, except for the issues that will be negotiated in the permanent status negotiations.

The first phase included the withdrawal from the Areas A and B. Redeployments from Area C would follow in subsequent phases. Article XI.3 states:

"Area C" means areas of the West Bank outside Areas A and B, which, except for the issues that will be negotiated in the permanent status negotiations, will be gradually transferred to Palestinian jurisdiction in accordance with this Agreement.

The issues that will be negotiated, according to Article XVII.1, are:

"Jerusalem, settlements, specified military locations, Palestinian refugees, borders, foreign relations and Israelis; and ... powers and responsibilities not transferred to the Council."

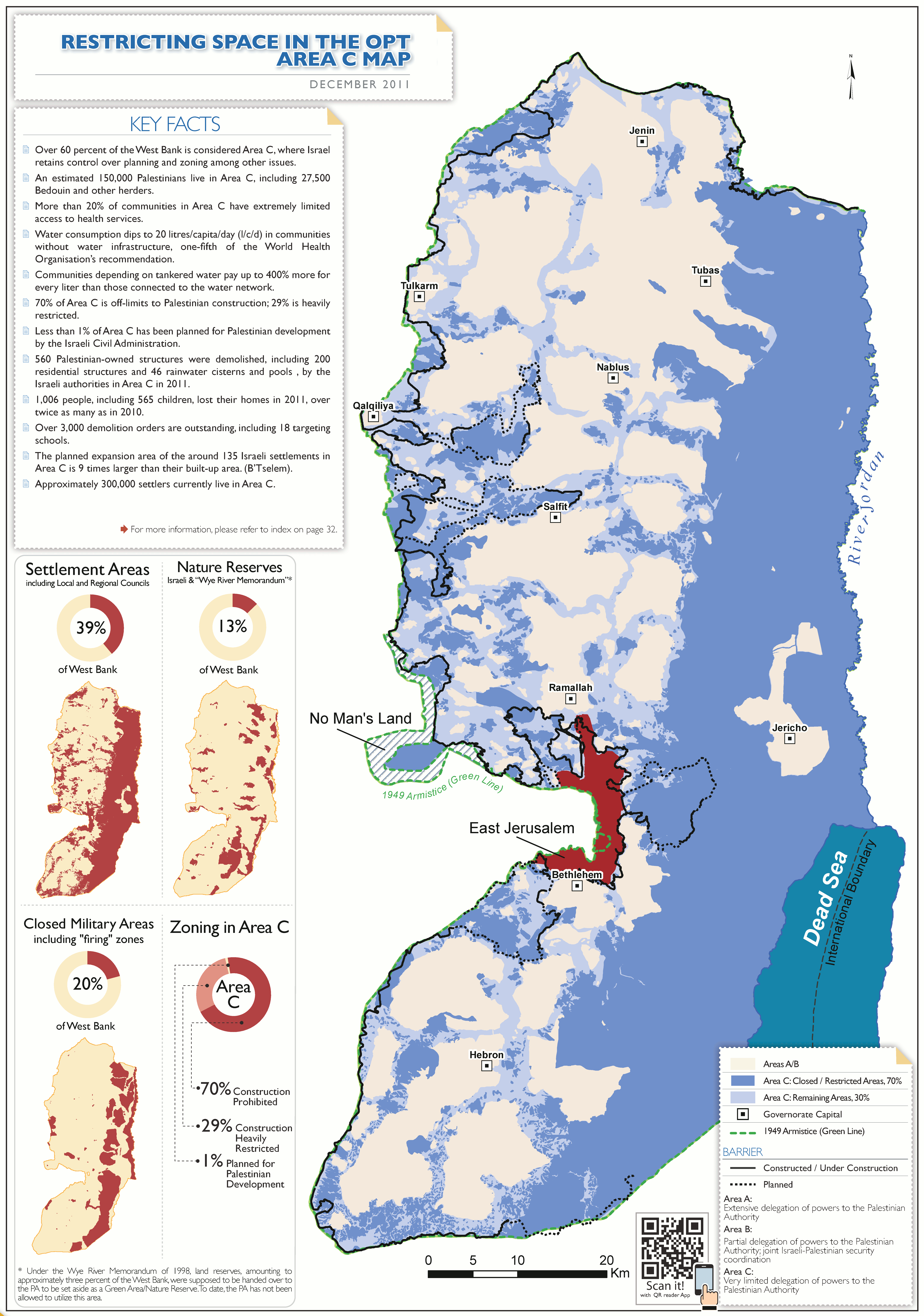
Area C, controlled by Israel under Oslo Accords, in blue and red, in December 2011

By excluding Jerusalem and the settlements from the areas to be transferred to the Palestinians, Israeli presence, including the military to protect them, would not change without a negotiated agreement. The Accords also preserve Israel's exclusive control of the borders, the airspace and the territorial Gaza waters. Oslo II, Article XII:

In order to guarantee public order and internal security for the Palestinians of the West Bank and the Gaza Strip, the Council shall establish a strong police force as set out in Article XIV below. Israel shall continue to carry the responsibility for defense against external threats, including the responsibility for protecting the Egyptian and Jordanian borders, and for defense against external threats from the sea and from the air, as well as the responsibility for overall security of Israelis and Settlements, for the purpose of safeguarding their internal security and public order, and will have all the powers to take the steps necessary to meet this responsibility.

The first step was a partial Israeli withdrawal from Gaza and Jericho and transfer of some powers and responsibilities on civil matters to the interim Palestinian Authority. All to agree upon within two months from October 1993 (Oslo I, Annex II).

Then, Israeli troops were to withdraw from populated Palestinian areas to pave the way for Palestinian elections to establish the council. The council would replace the PA, and the Israeli Civil Administration in the West Bank would be dissolved (Oslo II, Article I). Further redeployments of Israeli troops would follow upon the inauguration of the council, as detailed in the Protocol, Annex I of the Accord. Article I, 5. of Oslo II reads: "After the inauguration of the Council, the Civil Administration in the West Bank will be dissolved, and the Israeli military government shall be withdrawn...."

Twenty years later, however, the withdrawal of Israeli troops did not take place, and the Civil Administration still has permanent military presence in more than 80% of the West Bank (Area B and C).

Permanent status negotiations about remaining issues would start not later than May 1996 (two years after the signing of the Gaza–Jericho Agreement; Oslo I, Article V) and be concluded before May 1999 (end of 5 year interim period). A peace treaty would end the Israeli–Palestinian conflict.

=== Palestinian Authority and Legislative Council ===
When the Oslo I Accord was signed in 1993, neither a government, nor a parliament existed for the Palestinian territories. The Palestinian Authority (PA or PNA) was created by the 1994 Gaza–Jericho Agreement. Article III.1 reads:

Israel shall transfer authority as specified in this Agreement from the Israeli military government and its Civil Administration to the Palestinian Authority, hereby established, in accordance with Article V of this Agreement, except for the authority that Israel shall continue to exercise as specified in this Agreement.

The PA temporarily executed some powers and responsibilities until the establishment of the Council. Article I.1–2 of the Oslo II Accord read:

1. Israel shall transfer powers and responsibilities as specified in this Agreement from the Israeli military government and its Civil Administration to the Council in accordance with this Agreement. Israel shall continue to exercise powers and responsibilities not so transferred. 2. Pending the inauguration of the Council, the powers and responsibilities transferred to the Council shall be exercised by the Palestinian Authority established in accordance with the Gaza-Jericho Agreement, which shall also have all the rights, liabilities and obligations to be assumed by the Council in this regard. Accordingly, the term 'Council' throughout this Agreement shall, pending the inauguration of the Council, be construed as meaning the Palestinian Authority.

The first elections for the Palestinian Legislative Council (PLC) were on 20 January 1996. The governments elected by the PLC retained the name "Palestinian National Authority."

The Oslo Accords contained substantial provisions on economic matters and international aid: Annex IV of the Declaration of Principles (DoP) discusses regional cooperation and implicitly calls for major international aid efforts to help the Palestinians, Jordan, Israel and the entire region.

After the Oslo Accords were signed in 1993, an international conference was held in Washington, D.C. to assure the economic solvency of the newly established Palestinian Authority. Key goals were economic development in the West Bank and the Gaza Strip, Middle East stability, introducing liberalized markets, sustaining democratic institutions, and protecting human rights. According to the Organization for Economic Cooperation and Development, aid to Palestinians totaled over $40 billion between 1994 and 2020. The biggest amount of this assistance (35.4%) was for supporting the PA's budget, while the rest was distributed to various economic sectors and services in the Palestinian territories. The majority of the aid (≈72%) was provided by ten donors: the European Union (18.9%), the United States (14.2%), Saudi Arabia (9.9%), Germany (5.8%), the United Arab Emirates (5.2%), Norway (4.8%), United Kingdom (4.3%), the World Bank (3.2%), Japan (2.9%), and France (2.7%).

=== Transitional period ===
The Transitional Period is commonly known as the interim period (Oslo I, Article V) or interim phase. Hence the name "Interim Agreement" for the Oslo II Accord and the term "Interim Self-Government Authority" (Oslo I, Article I). The interim period was designed to bridge the period between the establishment of the Palestinian Interim Self-Government Authority and the Palestinian Legislative Council, and the end of the permanent status negotiations, "leading to a permanent settlement based on Security Council Resolutions 242 and 338" (Oslo I, Article I). The permanent settlement was not defined. The interim period ended on 4 May 1999, five years after the signing of the Gaza–Jericho Agreement.

Article V of the Declaration of Principles on Interim Self-Government Arrangements (DOP or Oslo I) reads:

Transitional Period and Permanent Status Negotiations

1. The five-year transitional period will begin upon the withdrawal from the Gaza Strip and Jericho area.

2. Permanent status negotiations will commence as soon as possible, but not later than the beginning of the third year of the interim period, between the Government of Israel and the Palestinian people's representatives.

3. It is understood that these negotiations shall cover remaining issues, including: Jerusalem, refugees, settlements, security arrangements, borders, relations and cooperation with other neighbors, and other issues of common interest.

4. The two parties agree that the outcome of the permanent status negotiations should not be prejudiced or preempted by agreements reached for the interim period.

=== End of the interim period ===
In May 1999, the five year interim period ended without reaching a comprehensive peace agreement. Both parties had agreed to:

“establish a Palestinian Interim Self-Government Authority...for the Palestinian people in the West Bank and the Gaza Strip, for a transitional period not exceeding five years, leading to a permanent settlement based on Security Council Resolutions 242 and 338"

Some have interpreted this to mean that the Palestinian Authority was only meant to be temporary. Others have accused Israeli governments of not living up to their obligations under the Accord. The lack of a permanent agreement has led both Israelis and Palestinians to regard the Oslo Accords as no longer relevant.

Nevertheless, elements of the Oslo Accords remained. The interim Palestinian Authority became permanent, and a dominant factor of the PLO. The West Bank remained divided into Areas A, B and C. Area C, covering some 60% of the West Bank, is under exclusive Israeli military and civilian control. Less than 1% of area C is designated for use by Palestinians, who are also unable to build in their own existing villages in area C due to Israeli restrictions. The Israeli Civil Administration, part of a larger entity known as Coordinator of Government Activities in the Territories (COGAT), which is a unit in the Defense Ministry of Israel, is still functioning in full. The Israeli–Palestinian Joint Water Committee also still exists.

At the 2000 Camp David Summit, the US tried to save the Accords by reviving the negotiations. After the failure of the Summit, the Second Intifada broke out and the "peace process" reached a deadlock.

=== Security control ===
Following the Gaza–Jericho Agreement and prior to the first Palestinian Authority elections, Israel withdrew in 1994 from Jericho and from most of the Gaza Strip. In accordance with the Hebron Protocol, Israel withdrew from 80% of Hebron in January 1997. With stalled negotiations, further redeployments did not take place. By March 1998, none of the withdrawals had occurred. In October 1998, the parties signed the Wye River Memorandum, promising resumption of the redeployments, but only the first stage was implemented. While Netanyahu faced opposition within his cabinet, additional withdrawals were delayed. During the Second Intifada, in 2002, the Israeli military re-occupied many of the areas previously turned over to Palestinian control.

=== Security coordination ===
The Oslo Accords brought on the security coordination between Israel and the PA. Military intelligence coordination officially began in 1996. After the Western Wall Tunnel riots, the Palestinian leadership effectively ceased security coordination with Israel, but it was renewed after the signing of the Wye River Memorandum. During the second Intifada coordination was intermittent, and it did not function effectively in 2000–2006. The following years, the security coordination bore significant achievements, and has become a significant factor in maintaining security for both sides. A security analysis presented to the Israeli government by Shin Bet in 2016 praised the security cooperation. According to the IDF, Palestinian security forces were responsible for about 40% of arrests of terrorism suspects in the West Bank in early 2016. Following the announcement that Israel will unilaterally annex territories in May 2020, the Palestinian Authority ceased security coordination with Israel. In August 2020, the annexation process was put on hold following the Israel–United Arab Emirates normalization agreement, and in November security cooperation was restored.

Immediately following an Israeli military raid on Jenin on 26 January 2023 in which 10 Palestinians were killed, the Palestinian Authority suspended security coordination. According to U.S. and Israeli officials, U.S. security coordinator Lt. Gen. Michael Fenzel presented a security plan to the Israeli government and to the PA prior to the raid. After the raid, U.S. Secretary of State Antony Blinken, at a meeting in Ramallah with President Mahmoud Abbas, pressed for the acceptance of the plan, which contemplates a Palestinian clamp down on Palestinian armed groups. The Palestinians objected to the lack of emphasis on Israel de-escalating and decreasing its raids in the West Bank. Subsequently, on 5 February 2023, Osama Qawasmeh, member of the Political Committee of the Palestine Liberation Organization (PLO), said "The decisions that taken [by the leadership] are irreversible and have entered into force, whether with regard to the relationship with Israel or seeking action at international institutions in light of the unsustainability of the current status quo.".

== Aftermath ==
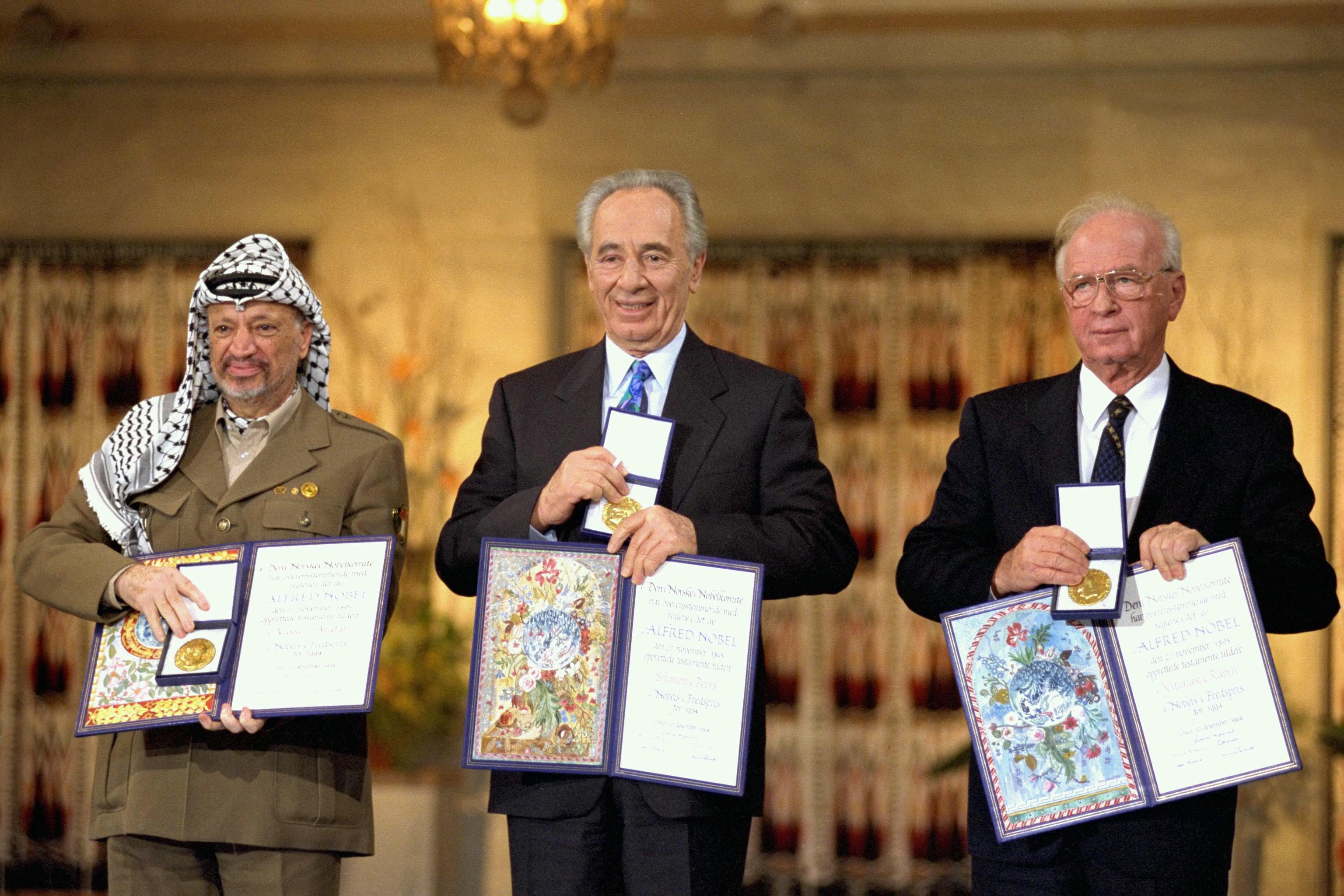
Yasser Arafat, Shimon Peres and Yitzhak Rabin receiving the Nobel Peace Prize following the Oslo Accords, 10 December 1994

Less than six months after the signing of the DOP, an Israeli extremist killed 29 Palestinians in the Cave of the Patriarchs massacre. In response Hamas conducted its first lethal suicide bombing, killing eight Israelis and injuring 34. An additional five Israelis were killed and 30 injured when a Palestinian detonated himself on a bus in Hadera a week later. Hamas claimed responsibility for both attacks. The attacks may have been timed to disrupt negotiations between Israel and the PLO on the implementation of the Oslo I Accord. Hamas stated that these attacks were to put an end to the "peace process" and in response to the Cave of the Patriarchs Massacre. In 1994, Hamas killed around 55 Israelis and injured over 150 in an effort to derail the peace process, stating that its attacks were part of a jihad against Israel's occupation as well as retaliation for the Cave of the Patriarchs Massacre.

Following the assassination of Yitzhak Rabin, the Labor Party's recently selected prime minister, Shimon Peres, gave the green light for the assassination of Yahya Ayyash, which Avi Shlaim describes as "the greatest mistake of Peres's political career" due to the subsequent rise of suicide attacks. Shortly after this increase in violence and Israeli security concerns, polls showed Likud's Benjamin Netanyahu ahead of Peres for the first time since Rabin's murder. According to Ronen Bergman, the bombing campaign, and the failure of Israeli intelligence services to prevent it, was one of the factors that led to the defeat of Peres and Labor in the 1996 Israeli general election and the victory of the right-wing Likud party of Netanyahu, who opposed the Oslo Accords. Bergman writes that "after the election, the attacks stopped for almost a year. Some said this was because of Arafat's campaign against Hamas, and the arrest of many members of its military wing. Others believed that Hamas no longer had any reason to carry out suicide attacks, because Netanyahu had already almost completely stopped the peace process, which was the short-term goal of the attacks anyway." Shlaim describes the role played by the Israeli right during and after the Oslo years, highlighting Netanyahu's "largely successful" attempts to undermine the accords after his election in 1996.

Despite the Oslo Accords stipulating that "neither side shall initiate or take any step that will change the status of the West Bank and the Gaza Strip pending the outcome of the permanent status negotiations", Israeli settlement expansion continued during the Oslo period. The Jewish population in the West Bank and Gaza Strip (excluding East Jerusalem) grew from 115,700 to 203,000 between 1993 and 2000.

This expansion of settlements is widely seen to be a key obstacle to peace. Avi Shlaim describes this situation:

Throughout the peace talks of the 1990s, Israel’s settlements had expanded against a backdrop of growing Palestinian frustration, aggravated by Israeli closure and zoning policies that severely undermined the Palestinian economy, weakened its labor markets, and physically separated the Gaza Strip from the West Bank.

Between 1993 and 2000, following the Oslo agreements, the Palestinian population experienced some increased autonomy within areas allocated by the accords such as Jericho, Areas A and B of the West Bank, Area H-1 of Hebron, and certain zones of the Gaza Strip. Despite this, the Israeli military maintained its presence in the occupied Palestinian territories while Israeli land confiscation and settlement expansion continued.

The governance of the Palestinian areas, although partly facilitated by the PA, remained under the overarching control of the Israeli government, which retained significant authority, particularly through the imposition of severe restrictions on the movement of Palestinian goods and people. As specified by Oslo II, Israel continued to control the entry and exit points of Palestinian areas as well as the road network linking them. Israel maintained its presence in East Jerusalem, 60 percent of the West Bank, and parts of the Gaza Strip.

A permanent "general closure" on the occupied territories was enforced in 1993, regulating access to Jerusalem and Israel and making travel between the West Bank and the Gaza Strip "nearly impossible". The Gaza Strip was completely cut off from the West Bank, isolating the two economies from each other. In 1994, an electric fence was constructed around the Gaza Strip.

Israeli journalist Amira Hass described this general closure mechanism:

Given the focus on its economic effects, closure throughout the Oslo years was said to be lifted whenever Palestinian workers and businessmen were given permits to cross into Israel...The great majority of the population, who could not leave because they had no work in Israel or business with Israelis, fell into the blind spot of the writers of reality’s ‘official version’ – most journalists and the officials and diplomats who talk to the press. Lost from sight was the fact that even when the closure was ‘lifted’, the vast majority of the population still couldn't go anywhere.

In addition to the general closure, Israel imposed temporary "comprehensive closures", which suspended all Palestinian travel permits and all movement (of people and goods) within the West Bank and Gaza Strip. The UN estimates that this comprehensive closure was in place for 353 complete days between March 1993 and June 1997.

In 1994, Arafat and Rabin were awarded the Nobel Peace Prize, along with Shimon Peres.

== Reception ==
The broad scholarly consensus towards the Oslo Accords is negative, with experts underlining their foundation built on an asymmetrical power dynamic between Israel and the Palestinians, the persistence of Israeli control over Palestinians lives, failure to address any of the key issues of the dispute, and entrenchment of "an occupation they were meant to end".

However, some remain optimistic about the achievements of Oslo. Acknowledging their shortcomings, in a 2023 editorial for The Washington Post, Dennis Ross and David Makovsky emphasized the accords' strengths and noted the regular collaboration between Israel and the Palestinian Authority on security and economic matters.

=== Continued settlement expansion ===
While Peres had limited settlement construction at the request of US Secretary of State Madeleine Albright, Netanyahu continued construction within existing Israeli settlements, and put forward plans for the construction of a new neighborhood, Har Homa, in East Jerusalem. However, he fell far short of the Shamir government's 1991–92 level and refrained from building new settlements, although the Oslo agreements stipulated no such ban. Construction of Housing Units:

- Before Oslo: 13,960 (1991–1992)
- After Oslo: 3,840 (1994–95) and 3,570 (1996–97).

During the years of the Oslo peace process, the population of settlers in the West Bank nearly doubled, and no settlements were evacuated.

=== Undermining Israeli security ===
Israeli academic Efraim Karsh described the Accords as "the starkest strategic blunder in [Israel's] history," creating the conditions for "the bloodiest and most destructive confrontation between Israelis and Palestinians since 1948" and radicalizing "a new generation of Palestinians" living under the rule of the Palestinian Authority and Hamas with "vile anti-Jewish (and anti-Israel) incitement unparalleled in scope and intensity since Nazi Germany." Karsh notes: "All in all, more than 1,600 Israelis have been murdered and another 9,000 wounded since the signing of the DOP [Declaration of Principles]—nearly four times the average death toll of the preceding twenty-six years."

=== Undermining Palestinian security ===
Graham Usher argued the Accords provided "unconditional security for the Israelis and conditional security for the Palestinians." He noted how the security arrangements were "no more than the practical implementation of Israel's territorial and security ambitions in the occupied territories" and failed to redress "the imbalanced distribution of military and territorial resources held by Israel over the PA."

Writing in the immediate aftermath of the Accords, Usher argued the multitude of various security forces provided enormous scope for political patronage and criticized Palestinian security forces for operating without "even a semblance of due process," undertaking mass arrest sweeps without judicial warrant or sanction.

=== Undermining Palestinian aspirations for statehood ===
Seth Anziska argued Oslo provided the "vestiges of statehood without actual content", formalizing the "ceiling of Palestinian self-rule". Pointing to statements from Rabin that referred to a permanent solution of Israel existing alongside a Palestinian 'entity' that was (in Rabin's words) "less than a state", Anziska argued the Accords were a legacy of Menachem Begin's opposition to Palestinian statehood. Edward Said in an interview said, "Israel and the Western governments want Arafat to repress certain elements of his society. They want him to be a dictator. The mechanism of the peace accord makes this perfectly clear. I am for peace. And I am for a negotiated peace. But this accord is not a just peace."

In his book Scars of War, Wounds of Peace, former Israeli foreign minister (at the time of the 2000 Camp David summit) Shlomo Ben-Ami describes the Oslo process:

One of the meanings of Oslo was that the PLO was Israel’s collaborator in the task of cutting short an authentically democratic struggle for Palestinian independence... The Israelis conceived of Arafat as a collaborator of sorts, a sub-contractor in the task of enhancing Israel’s security.

Ross and Makovsky noted, nevertheless, that in 2023 the Palestinian Authority had a "degree of control over close to 40 percent of the West Bank".

=== Deferring final status negotiations ===
Shamir Hassan noted how the Accords contained no "palpable effort to resolve the core issues that collectively define the Israeli-Palestinian conflict" such as borders, Palestinian refugees, and the status of Jerusalem.

Daniel Lieberfeld suggested Israel was constrained by its need for approval from key domestic institutions or constituencies, which meant excluding final-status issues from the negotiations. Lieberfeld argued it was unclear how such concerns were expected to have diminished within a few years to make final-status talks possible.

=== Norway's role ===
Norwegian academics, including Norway's leading authority on the negotiations, Hilde Henriksen Waage, have focused on the flawed role of Norway during the Oslo process. In 2001, the Norwegian Ministry of Foreign Affairs, who had been at the heart of the Oslo process, commissioned Waage to produce an official, comprehensive history of the Norwegian-mediated back channel negotiations. In order to do the research, she was given privileged access to all relevant, classified files in the ministry's archives. Waage was surprised to discover "not a single scrap of paper for the entire period from January to September 1993—precisely the period of the back channel talks." Involved persons kept documents privately and refused to hand them over. Waage concluded that "there seems no doubt that the missing documents ... would have shown the extent to which the Oslo process was conducted on Israel's premises, with Norway acting as Israel's helpful errand boy." Norway played a mediating role as a small state between vastly unequal parties and had to play by the rules of the stronger party, acting on its premises. "Israel's red lines were the ones that counted, and if the Palestinians wanted a deal, they would have to accept them, too.... The missing documents would almost certainly show why the Oslo process probably never could have resulted in a sustainable peace. To a great extent, full documentation of the back channel would explain the disaster that followed Oslo."

== Alternatives to the Oslo Accords ==
Although the Oslo Accords did not explicitly endorse a two-state solution, they did create self-governing Palestinian institutions in the West Bank and Gaza, and as such have been interpreted as anticipating a two-state future.

Ian Lustick argues the embrace of a two-state solution at the height of the Oslo process has since dissipated and an alternative proposal is a one-state solution, which would combine Israel and the Palestinian territories into a single state with one government.

Brendan O'Leary suggests the success of a one-state solution might lie in its drawing on existing identities and institutions rather than imagining them gone.

Alternatively, Uri Avnery equates a one-state solution with "turning Israel into a non-national state", and argues "Israeli superiority in nearly all practical fields—economic, social, military—would be such that the Palestinians would be turned into an exploited underclass devoid of real power". Avnery goes on: "The national struggle would by no means cease. It would make it much easier for Jews to buy Arab land on the West Bank, control immigration, and take other measures to safeguard their national superiority."

== See also ==
- Oslo, 2016 drama by J.T. Rogers, premiere production July 2016 in London
- Arafat's Johannesburg Address
- Islamic Salvation Party
- Seeds of Peace
- Israeli apartheid

== List of agreements ==
Key agreements in the Oslo process were:

- Israel–PLO letters of recognition (1993). Mutual recognition of Israel and the PLO.
- The Oslo I Accord (1993). The "Declaration of Principles on Interim Self-Government Arrangements" (DOPOISGA or DOP), which declared the aim of the negotiations and set forth the framework for the interim period. Dissolution of the Israeli Civil Administration upon the inauguration of the Palestinian Legislative Council (Article VII).
- The Gaza–Jericho Agreement or Cairo Agreement (1994). Partial Israeli withdrawal within three weeks from Gaza Strip and Jericho area, being the start of the five-year transitional period (Article V of Oslo I). Simultaneously transfer of limited power to the Palestinian Authority, which was established in the same agreement. Part of the Agreement was the Protocol on Economic Relations (Paris Protocol), which regulates the economic relationship between Israel and the Palestinian Authority, but in effect integrated the Palestinian economy into the Israeli one. This agreement was superseded by the Oslo II Accord, except for Article XX (Confidence-Building Measures). Article XX dictated the release or turn over of Palestinian detainees and prisoners by Israel. The Paris Protocol was incorporated in Article XXIV of Oslo II.
- The Oslo II Accord (1995). Division of the West Bank into Areas, in effect fragmenting it into numerous enclaves and banning the Palestinians from some 60% of the West Bank. Redeployment of Israeli troops from Area A and from other areas through "Further Re-deployments." Election of the Palestinian Legislative Council (Palestinian parliament, PLC), replacing the PA upon its inauguration. Deployment of Palestinian Police replacing Israeli military forces in Area A. Safe passage between West Bank and Gaza. Most importantly, start of negotiations on a final settlement of remaining issues, to be concluded before 4 May 1999.

All later agreements had the purpose to implement the former four key agreements.

Additional Israeli-Palestinian agreements related to the Oslo Accords are:

- Agreement on Preparatory Transfer of Powers and Responsibilities Between Israel and the PLO (August 1994)

This agreement was signed on 29 August 1994 at the Erez Crossing. It is also known as Early Empowerment Agreement (the term is used on the Israel MFA website). Superseded by Oslo II.

- Protocol on Further Transfer of Powers and Responsibilities (August 1995)

This agreement was signed on 27 August 1995 at Cairo. It is also known as Further Transfer Protocol. Superseded by Oslo II.

- Protocol Concerning the Redeployment in Hebron (January 1997)
- Wye River Memorandum (October 1998)
- Sharm el-Sheikh Memorandum (September 1999)
- Agreement on Movement and Access (November 2005)

== Sources ==
- Dunning, Tristan (2016). Hamas, Jihad and Popular Legitimacy: Reinterpreting Resistance in Palestine. Routledge. ISBN 978-1317384946.
- Stork, Joe; Kane, Kristen (2002). Erased in a Moment: Suicide Bombing Attacks Against Israeli Civilians. Human Rights Watch. pp. 66–. ISBN 978-1564322807.
