= Arafat's Johannesburg Address =

1994 speech by Yasser Arafat

The Johannesburg address was an address given by Yasser Arafat in a mosque in the South African city of Johannesburg on May 10, 1994, regarding the Oslo Accords, about half a year after the signing of the first Oslo Accords. During this speech, Yasser Arafat made several significant statements, notably declaring Jerusalem as the capital of Palestine and emphasizing the ongoing significance of Jihad until the eventual capture of Jerusalem. He drew a parallel between the Oslo Accords and the Treaty of Hudaybiyyah, a historical cease-fire agreement brokered by Muhammad with the Quraysh tribe, which was ultimately violated by the Quraysh tribe, leading to their conquest by Muhammad.

== Comparison to Treaty of Hudaybiyyah ==
In his speech, Arafat compared the Oslo Accords to the Treaty of Hudaybiyyah, a temporary peace treaty between Muhammad and the tribe of Quraysh which controlled Mecca, which was later broken and resulted in the conquest of Mecca by Muhammad, saying it is likewise an "agreement of the very low class".

"This agreement I am not considering it more than the agreement which had been signed between our prophet Muhammad and Quraysh. And you remember, Caliph Omar had refused this agreement and considering the agreement of the very low class. But Muhammud had accepted it and we are accepting now this peace accord."

12 days before the signing of the Oslo Accords on September 13, 1993, Yasser Arafat delivered a pre-recorded speech broadcast on Jordanian television. In this address, he communicated to the Palestinian people that the "Declaration of Principles," which later became known as the Oslo Accords, constituted only a component of the implementation of the PLO's "Strategy of Phases." This strategic plan reaffirmed the PLO's commitment to retaining all territory in "Palestine" and asserted its dedication to employing all available means, with armed struggle being of primary importance, to achieve this objective.

== Jihad for Jerusalem ==
Arafat proclaimed Jerusalem the capital of Palestine and called for a Jihad to liberate it.

"I have to speak frankly, I can’t do it alone without the support of the Islamic nation. I can’t do it alone. No, you have to come and to fight and to start the Jihad to liberate Jerusalem, your first shrine."

Arafat later claimed that his words were being misunderstood, and that the Jihad he referred to was the Jihad of the heart.
