= James Allen Graff =

James Allen Graff (b. East Orange, NJ, 1937 - d. Toronto, ON, October 23, 2005) was a professor of philosophy at the University of Toronto and an activist focused on human rights in Palestine.

== Academic background ==
He earned a BA at Lafayette College in 1959 and his doctorate at Brown University in 1963 with a thesis titled: The Concept of a Moral Agent. As a professor at Toronto his teaching focused on ethics and political philosophy. John Irving, then head of the Department of Ethics at Victoria College, hired him as a lecturer in 1963. When Francis Sparshott stepped down as chairman of that department in 1970, Graff was appointed to succeed him. He held the post until the Department of Ethics was abolished and its members absorbed into the Department of Philosophy in 1975. He stayed at the department of philosophy, as a professor until 2002 and as professor emeritus until his death.

== Palestine activism ==
According to his University of Toronto obituary, "His principal interest in later years was the plight of the Palestinian people" and he wrote and spoke "widely and passionately on that topic".

Graff founded Canada's Near East Cultural and Education Foundation (NECEF) in 1984, which describes its mission as promoting "a greater understanding in Canada of the history, culture and contemporary situation in the Middle East, focusing on the Arab World" and funding "humanitarian, educational, development and health related projects both in the region and here at home."

His obituary in Canada's The Globe and Mail called him a "passionate and tireless advocate of Palestinian rights, he poured most of his energy into public awareness and alleviation of the plight of Palestinian children living under Israeli occupation and in the Arab world." The paper also said he "also criticized the Palestinian Authority's record on human rights -- at a cost to the movement that may never be known." From 1986 to 1996 Graff represented NECEF on and was vice chairman of the North American Coordinating Committee for Non-Governmental Organizations on the Question of Palestine. That group "met regularly at United Nations headquarters in New York." He stepped down from the committee in 1996 due to becoming legally blind.

"Jim hated [violence]," Anglican Reverend Robert Assaly told The Globe and Mail, recalling how Palestinian official human rights abuses - first by the PLO and later by the PA - started to capture Graff's attention during the negotiation of the Oslo Peace Accords. "Not only did he speak out against the violence, he spoke out against the violent. He and I kind of got the whole Non-governmental Organization movement on the Question of Palestine tossed out of the United Nations for that."

Janet Gunn in her memoir recalls the instrumental role Graff played in trying to save the life of Mohamed Abu Aker, a Palestinian 16-year-old who in 1988 had been shot by an Israeli soldier during a stone-throwing demonstration in his refugee camp near Bethlehem in the occupied West Bank. Aker needed a small bowel transplant if he was to survive his wounds - something that could not be done in the West Bank - and Graff used his contacts in the US to arrange the required visas and medical care. Mohamed eventually died from his injuries in October 1990.

An annual scholarship is awarded for study at Birzeit University in memory of Graff and Patrick Newton.

== Bibliography ==
- Fundamental concepts in Philosophy, Victoria College Press, 1982
- Palestinian children and Israeli state violence, with M. Abdolell, Near East Cultural and Educational Foundation, 1991
- Human rights, peoples, and the right to self-determination, University of Toronto Press, 1994

== See also ==
- List of University of Toronto people
