= Oslo I Accord =

1993 Israel–Palestine Liberation Organization agreement

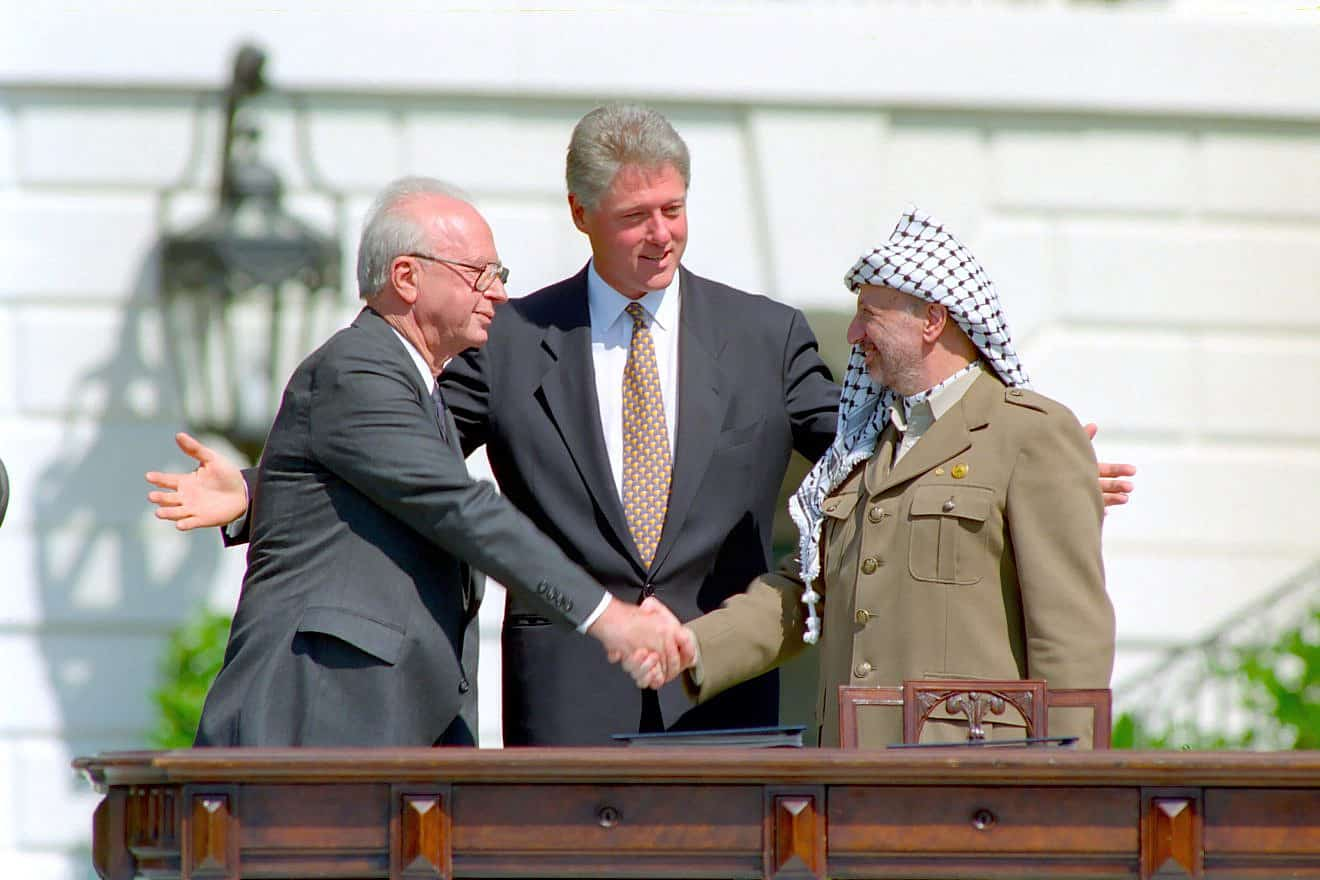
Israeli Prime Minister Yitzhak Rabin, U.S. President Bill Clinton, and Yasser Arafat at the Oslo Accords signing ceremony on 13 September 1993

The Oslo I Accord or Oslo I, officially called the Declaration of Principles on Interim Self-Government Arrangements or short Declaration of Principles (DOP), was an attempt in 1993 to set up a framework that would lead to the resolution of the ongoing Israeli–Palestinian conflict. It was the first face-to-face agreement between the government of Israel and the Palestine Liberation Organization (PLO).

Negotiations concerning the agreement, an outgrowth of the Madrid Conference of 1991, were conducted secretly in Oslo, Norway, hosted by the Fafo institute, and completed on 20 August 1993; the Oslo Accords were subsequently officially signed at a public ceremony in Washington, D.C., on 13 September 1993, in the presence of PLO chairman Yasser Arafat, Israeli Prime Minister Yitzhak Rabin and U.S. President Bill Clinton. The documents themselves were signed by Mahmoud Abbas for the PLO, foreign Minister Shimon Peres for Israel, U.S. Secretary of State Warren Christopher for the United States and foreign minister Andrei Kozyrev for Russia.

The Accord provided for the creation of a Palestinian interim self-government, the Palestinian National Authority (PNA). The Palestinian Authority would have responsibility for the administration of the territory under its control. The Accords also called for the withdrawal of the Israel Defense Forces (IDF) from parts of the Gaza Strip and West Bank.

It was anticipated that this arrangement would last for a five-year interim period during which a permanent agreement would be negotiated (beginning no later than May 1996). Remaining issues such as the status of Jerusalem, Palestinian refugees, Israeli settlements, security and borders would be part of the "permanent status negotiations" during this period.

In August 1993, the delegations had reached an agreement, which was signed in secrecy by Peres while visiting Oslo. In the Letters of Mutual Recognition, the PLO acknowledged the State of Israel and pledged to reject violence, and Israel recognized the PLO as the representative of the Palestinian people and as partner in negotiations. Yasser Arafat was allowed to return to the Occupied Palestinian Territories. In 1995, the Oslo I Accord was followed by Oslo II.

Signing of the accords

== Principles of the Accords ==
In essence, the accords called for the withdrawal of Israeli forces from parts of the Gaza Strip and West Bank, and affirmed a Palestinian right of self-government within those areas through the creation of a Palestinian Interim Self-Government Authority. Palestinian rule was to last for a five-year interim period during which "permanent status negotiations" would commence in order to reach a final agreement.

The negotiations would cover major issues such as Jerusalem, Palestinian refugees, Israeli settlements, and security and borders were to be decided at these permanent status negotiations (Article V). Israel was to grant interim self-government to the Palestinians in phases.

Along with the principles, the two groups signed Letters of Mutual Recognition—the Israeli government recognized the PLO as the legitimate representative of the Palestinian people, while the PLO recognized the right of the state of Israel to exist and renounced terrorism as well as other violence, and its desire for the destruction of the Israeli state.

The aim of Israeli–Palestinian negotiations was to establish a Palestinian Interim Self-Government Authority, an elected Council, for the Palestinian people in the West Bank and the Gaza Strip, for a transitional period not exceeding five years, leading to a permanent settlement based on UN Security Council Resolutions 242 and 338, an integral part of the whole peace process.

In order that the Palestinians govern themselves according to democratic principles, free and general political elections would be held for the council.

Jurisdiction of the Palestinian Council would cover the West Bank and Gaza Strip, except for issues that would be finalized in the permanent status negotiations. The two sides viewed the West Bank and Gaza as a single territorial unit.

The permanent status negotiations between Israel and the Palestinians would start "not later than the beginning of the third year of the interim period"; the interim period would "begin upon the withdrawal from the Gaza Strip and Jericho area". That withdrawal began with the signing of the Gaza–Jericho Agreement on 4 May 1994, thus the interim period would end on 4 May 1999.

The five-year transitional period would commence with Israeli withdrawal from the Gaza Strip and Jericho area. There would be a transfer of authority from the Israel Defense Forces to the authorized Palestinians, concerning education and culture, health, social welfare, direct taxation, and tourism. The council would establish a strong police force, while Israel would continue to carry the responsibility for defending against external threats.

An Israeli–Palestinian Economic Cooperation Committee would be established in order to develop and implement in a cooperative manner the programs identified in the protocols.

The Declaration of Principles would enter into force one month after its signing. All protocols annexed to the Declaration of Principles and the Agreed Minutes pertaining to it were to be regarded as a part of it.

== Content of the Oslo I Accord ==
=== Main articles ===
The Oslo I Accord contains 17 articles.

=== Annexes ===
The Oslo I Accord contains four annexes:

==== Annex 1: Conditions of Palestinian Elections ====
This annex covered election agreements, a system of elections, rules and regulations regarding election campaigns, including agreed arrangements for the organizing of mass media, and the possibility of licensing a TV station.

==== Annex 2: Withdrawal of Israeli forces ====
An agreement on the withdrawal of Israeli military forces from the Gaza Strip and Jericho area. This agreement will include comprehensive arrangements to apply in the Gaza Strip and the Jericho area subsequent to the Israeli withdrawal. Internal security and public order by the Palestinian police force consisting of police officers recruited locally and from abroad (holding Jordanian passports and Palestinian documents issued by Egypt). Those who will participate in the Palestinian police force coming from abroad should be trained as police and police officers.

- A temporary international or foreign presence, as agreed upon.
- Establishment of a joint Palestinian–Israeli Coordination and Cooperation Committee for mutual security purposes.
- Arrangements for a safe passage for persons and transportation between the Gaza Strip and Jericho area.
- Arrangements for coordination between both parties regarding passages: Gaza–Egypt; and Jericho–Jordan.

==== Annex 3: Economic cooperation ====
The two sides agree to establish an Israeli–Palestinian continuing Committee for economic cooperation, focusing, among other things, on the following:

- Cooperation in the field of water
- Cooperation in the field of electricity
- Cooperation in the field of energy
- Cooperation in the field of finance
- Cooperation in the field of transport and communications
- Cooperation in the field of trade and commerce
- Cooperation in the field of industry
- Cooperation in, and regulation of, labor relations
- Cooperation in social welfare issues
- An environmental protection plan
- Cooperation in the field of communication and media

==== Annex 4: Regional development ====
The two sides will cooperate in the context of the multilateral peace efforts in promoting a Development Program for the region, including the West Bank and the Gaza Strip, to be initiated by the G7 countries.

=== Agreed Minutes ===
The Oslo I Accord contains some explanations of a number of articles in the Accord, with understandings the parties had agreed on:

==== General understandings ====
Any powers and responsibilities transferred to the Palestinians through the Declaration of Principles prior to the inauguration of the council will be subject to the same principles pertaining to Article IV, as set out in the agreed minutes below.

==== Specific understandings ====
Article IV
Council's jurisdiction

It was to be understood that: Jurisdiction of the council would cover West Bank and Gaza Strip territory, except for issues that would be negotiated in the permanent status negotiations.

Article V
Permanent status negotiations issues

It was understood that several issues were postponed to permanent status negotiations, including: Jerusalem, refugees, settlements, security arrangements, borders, relations and co-operation with other neighbours, and other issues of common interest. The outcome of these permanent status negotiations should not be prejudiced or pre-empted by the parties.

Article VI (2)
Transferring authority

It was agreed that the transfer of authority would be as follows: The Palestinians would inform the Israelis of the names of the authorized Palestinians who would assume the powers, authorities and responsibilities that would be transferred to the Palestinians according to the Declaration of Principles in the following fields: education and culture, health, social welfare, direct taxation, tourism, and any other authorities agreed upon.

Article VII (2)
Cooperation

The Interim Agreement would also include arrangements for coordination and cooperation.

Article VII (5)
Israel's powers

The withdrawal of the military government would not prevent Israel from exercising the powers and responsibilities not transferred to the council.

Article VIII
Police

It was understood that the Interim Agreement would include arrangements for cooperation and coordination. It was also agreed that the transfer of powers and responsibilities to the Palestinian police would be accomplished in a phased manner. The accord stipulated that Israeli and Palestinian police would do joint patrols.

Article X
Designating officials

It was agreed that the Israeli and Palestinian delegations would exchange the names of the individuals designated by them as members of the Joint Israeli–Palestinian Liaison Committee which would reach decisions by agreement.

Article XI
Israel's continuing responsibilities

It was understood that, subsequent to the Israeli withdrawal, Israel would continue to be responsible for external security, and for internal security and public order of settlements and Israelis. Israeli military forces and civilians would be allowed to continue using roads freely within the Gaza Strip and the Jericho area.

== Reactions ==
=== In Israel ===
In Israel, a strong debate over the accords took place; the left wing supported them, while the right wing opposed them. After a two-day discussion in the Knesset on the government proclamation in the issue of the accord and the exchange of the letters, on 23 September 1993, a vote of confidence was held in which 61 Knesset members voted for the decision, 50 voted against and 8 abstained.

On both sides (Israel and Palestine), there were fears of the other side's intentions. Israelis suspected that the Palestinians were entering into a tactical peace agreement, and that they were not sincere about wanting to reach peace and coexistence with Israel. They saw it as part of the PLO's Ten Point Program which calls for a national authority "over every part of Palestinian territory that is liberated" until "the liberation of all Palestinian territory" and understood it as an attempt to justify the signing of the accords as a step to reach a final goal.

Jerusalem's new mayor and later Prime Minister Ehud Olmert opposed the agreement and called it a "dark cloud over the city". He favored to bring more Jews to East Jerusalem and expand Jerusalem to the east.

=== In Palestine ===
Palestinian reactions were also divided. Fatah, the group that represented the Palestinians in the negotiations, accepted the accords. But Hamas, Palestinian Islamic Jihad and the Popular Front for the Liberation of Palestine objected to the accords.

On both sides (Israel and Palestine), there were fears of the other side's intentions. Many Palestinians feared that Israel was not serious about dismantling their settlements in the West Bank, especially around Jerusalem. They feared they might even accelerate their settlement program in the long run, by building more settlements and expanding existing ones.

=== In Lebanon ===
On 13 September 1993 the Lebanese Army opened fire on an anti-Oslo demonstration in south Beirut organised by Hizbollah killing nine people and wounding thirty.

=== Nobel Peace Prize ===
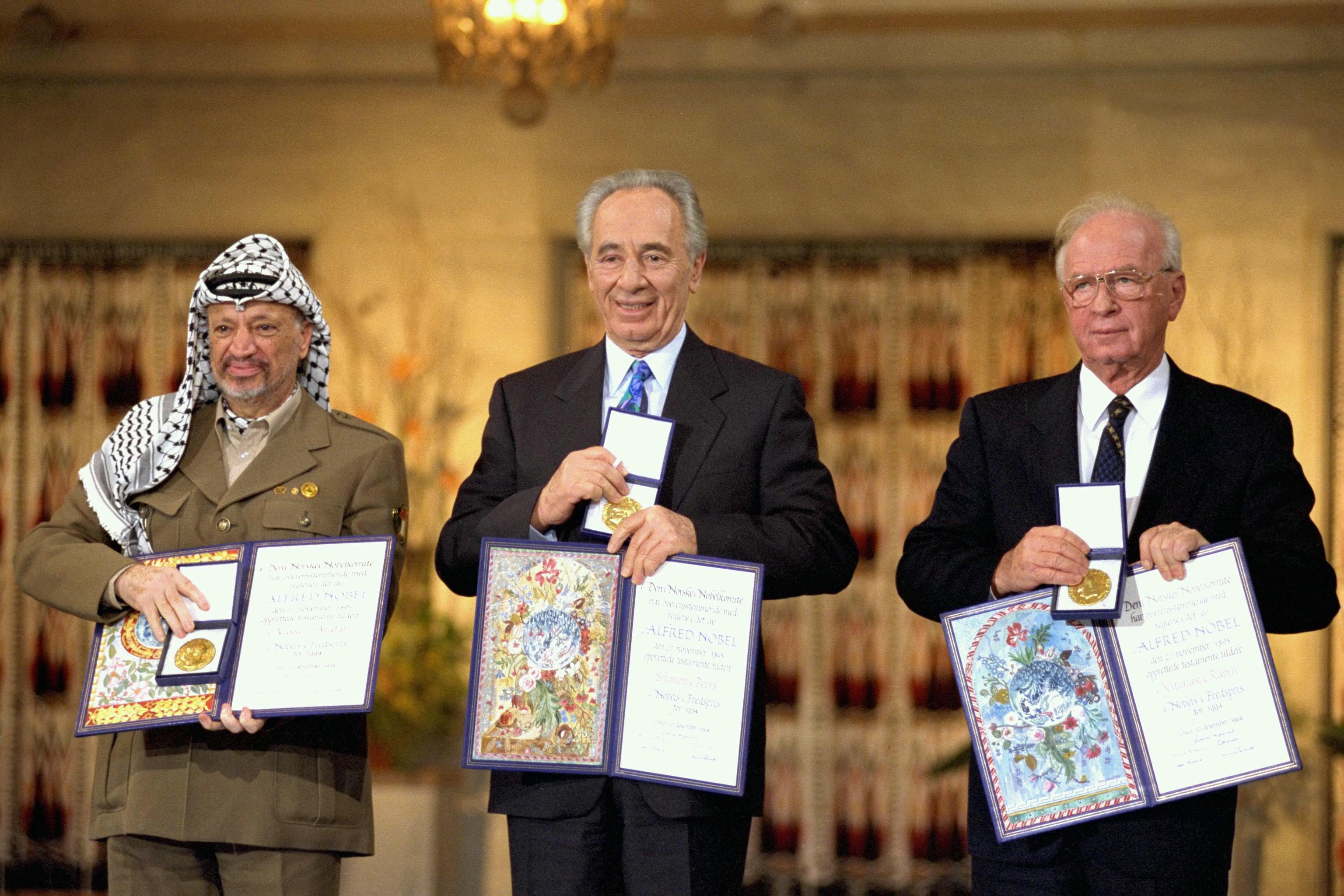
Yitzhak Rabin, Shimon Peres and Yasser Arafat receiving the Nobel Peace Prize following the Oslo Accords

In 1994 Israeli Prime Minister Yitzhak Rabin, Israeli Foreign Minister Shimon Peres, and PLO Chairman Yasser Arafat received the Nobel Peace Prize following the signing on the Oslo Accords, "for their efforts to create peace in the Middle East". The Accords have not resulted in peace to date.

== Remarks from Benjamin Netanyahu ==
In a 2001 video, Netanyahu, reportedly unaware he was being recorded, said: "They asked me before the election if I'd honor [the Oslo accords]... I said I would, but [that] I'm going to interpret the accords in such a way that would allow me to put an end to this galloping forward to the '67 borders. How did we do it? Nobody said what defined military zones were. Defined military zones are security zones; as far as I'm concerned, the entire Jordan Valley is a defined military zone. Go argue." Netanyahu then explained how he conditioned his signing of the 1997 Hebron agreement on American consent that there be no withdrawals from "specified military locations", and insisted he be allowed to specify which areas constituted a "military location"—such as the whole of the Jordan Valley. "Why is that important? Because from that moment on I stopped the Oslo Accords", Netanyahu affirmed. However, this is clearly consistent with Yitzhak Rabin's October 1995 statement to the Knesset on the ratification of the interim Oslo agreement: "B. The security border of the State of Israel will be located in the Jordan Valley, in the broadest meaning of that term."

== Additional agreements ==
In addition to the first accord, the parties concluded:

- The Gaza–Jericho Agreement or Cairo Agreement, signed on 4 May 1994, which initiated a partial Israeli withdrawal from Gaza Strip and Jericho area, and the establishment of the Palestinian Authority
- The Interim Agreement on the West Bank and the Gaza Strip (also known as Oslo 2), signed on 28 September 1995 gave Palestinians self-rule in Bethlehem, Hebron, Jenin, Nablus, Qalqilya, Ramallah, Tulkarm, and some 450 villages.

After 1995, a number of additional agreements were concluded to implement the Oslo Accords.

== Consequences of the accord ==
In 2013 the Norwegian Broadcasting Corporation stated, "The Oslo Accord divided the metropolis of Hebron—in two. In a small, fortified area of its old city quarters—a small group of Israeli settlers reside, surrounded by more than 120,000 Palestinians".

== See also ==
- Economic Cooperation Foundation
- History of the State of Palestine
- United States security assistance to the Palestinian Authority

People

- Ahmed Qurei alias Abu Ala—PLO negotiator during the Oslo peace process
- Yossi Beilin—Israeli negotiator during the Oslo peace process
- Jan Egeland—Norwegian Deputy Foreign Minister, provided political cover, facilities and finances for the negotiations
- Yair Hirschfeld—Israeli negotiator during the Oslo peace process
- Johan Jørgen Holst—Norwegian Minister of Foreign Affairs
- Mona Juul—Norwegian facilitator during the negotiations
- Ron Pundak—formed first Israeli negotiating team with Hirschfeld, before official Israeli involvement
- Uri Savir—former Director General of the Israeli Foreign Ministry, was Head of the Israeli negotiating team

== Bibliography ==
- Bregman, Ahron Elusive Peace: How the Holy Land Defeated America.
- Clinton, Bill (2005). My Life. Vintage. ISBN 978-1-4000-3003-3.
- Eran, Oded. "Arab–Israel Peacemaking". The Continuum Political Encyclopedia of the Middle East. Ed. Avraham Sela. New York: Continuum, 2002.
