= Oslo II Accord =

1995 agreement in the Israeli–Palestinian peace process

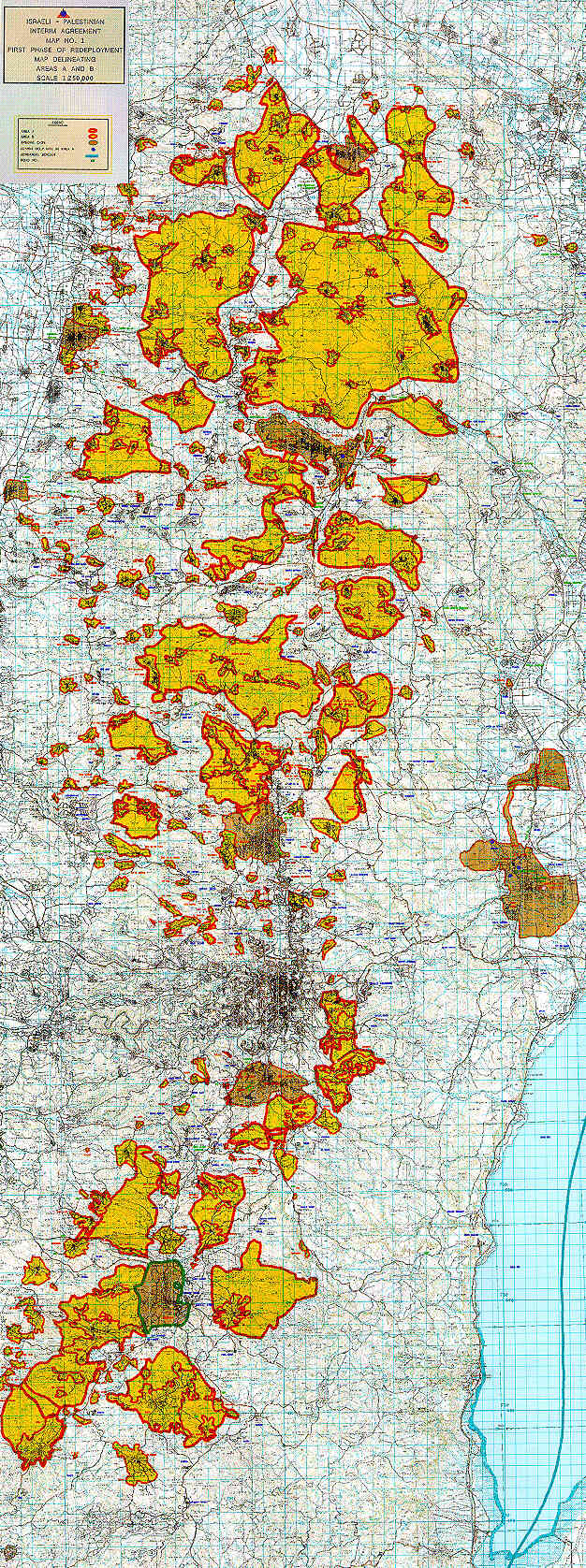
Official map of the first phase of the "Israeli-Palestinian interim agreement", Areas A and B (with C being defined as the rest of the West Bank)

The Interim Agreement on the West Bank and the Gaza Strip, commonly known as Oslo II or Oslo 2, was a key and complex agreement in the Israeli–Palestinian peace process. Because it was signed in Taba, Egypt, it is sometimes called the Taba Agreement. The Oslo Accords envisioned the establishment of a Palestinian interim self-government in the Palestinian territories. Oslo II created the Areas A, B and C in the West Bank. The Palestinian Authority was given some limited powers and responsibilities in the Areas A and B and a prospect of negotiations on a final settlement based on Security Council Resolutions 242 and 338. The Accord was officially signed on 28 September 1995.

== Historical context ==
The Oslo II Accord was first signed in Taba (in the Sinai Peninsula, Egypt) by Israel and the PLO on 24 September 1995 and then four days later on 28 September 1995 by Israeli Prime Minister Yitzhak Rabin and PLO Chairman Yasser Arafat and witnessed by US President Bill Clinton as well as by representatives of Russia, Egypt, Jordan, Norway, and the European Union in Washington, D.C.

The agreement is built on the foundations of the initial Oslo I Accord, formally called the Declaration of Principles on Interim Self-Government Arrangements, which had been formally signed on 13 September 1993 by Israel and the PLO, with Prime Minister Rabin and Chairman Arafat in Washington, D.C. shaking hands, and officially witnessed by the United States and Russia.

It supersedes three earlier agreements:

- the Gaza–Jericho Agreement or Cairo Agreement of 4 May 1994
- the Agreement on Preparatory Transfer of Powers and Responsibilities Between Israel and the PLO of 29 August 1994
- the Protocol on Further Transfer of Powers and Responsibilities of 27 August 1995

The Oslo II Accord is called an interim agreement because it was supposed to be the basis for subsequent negotiations and the preliminary of an eventual comprehensive peace agreement. Several additional agreements were concluded following Oslo II, but negotiations did not produce a final peace agreement. The 2002 Road map for peace abandoned the Oslo Accords and envisioned a rather loose scheme of withdrawal.

== Aim of the agreement ==
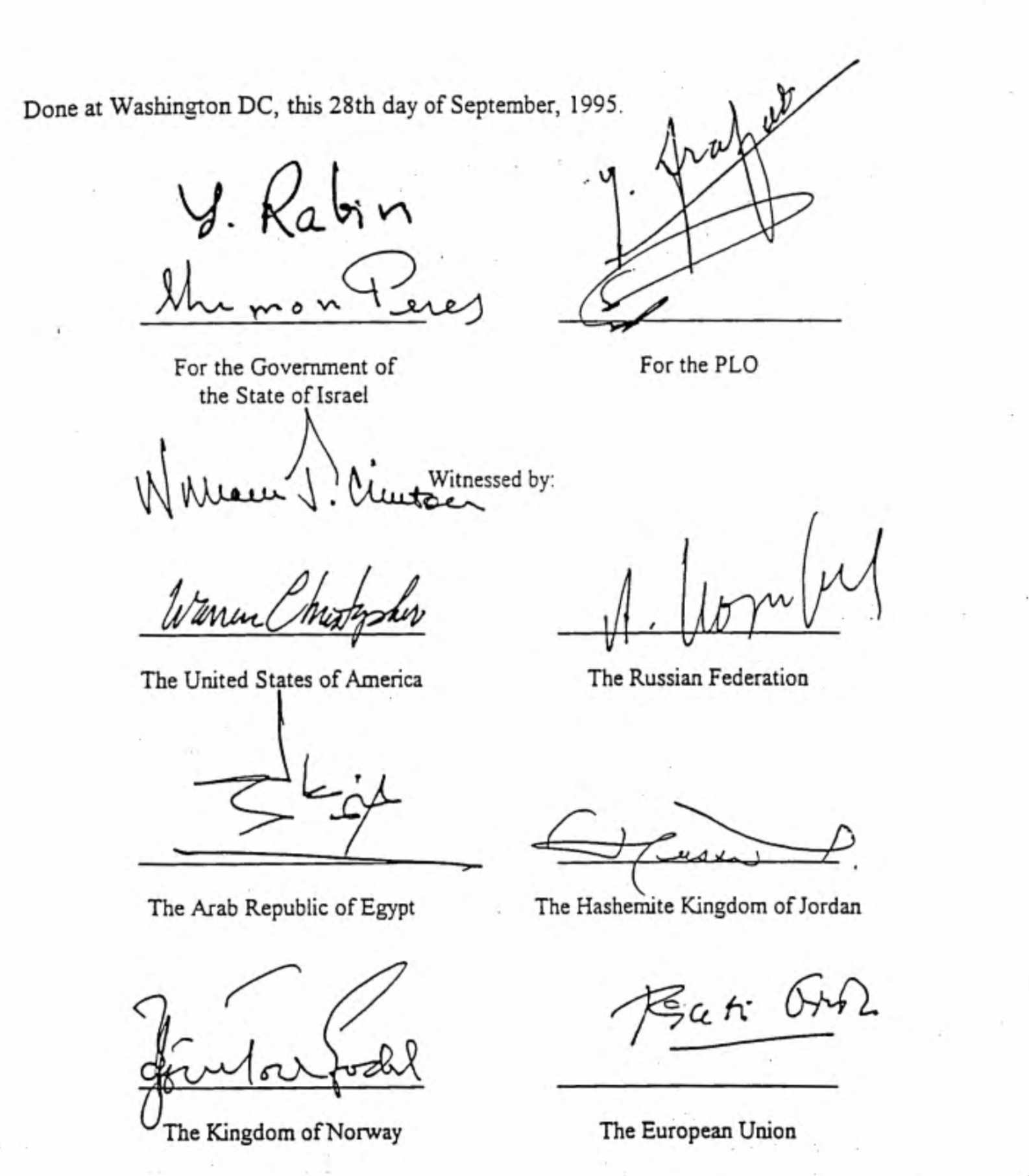
Signature page of the accord

The preamble of the agreement speaks of peaceful coexistence, mutual dignity, and security, while recognizing the mutual legitimate and political rights of the parties. The aim of the Israeli-Palestinian negotiations is, among other things, to establish a Palestinian Interim Self-Government Authority for the Palestinian people in the West Bank and the Gaza Strip, for a transitional period not exceeding five years, leading to a permanent settlement based on Security Council Resolutions 242 and 338.

As soon as possible but not later than 4 May 1996, negotiations on the permanent status would be started, leading to the implementation of Security Council Resolutions 242 and 338, and settling all the main issues.

The Israeli Ministry of Foreign Affairs declared the main object of the Interim Agreement

to broaden Palestinian self-government in the West Bank by means of an elected self-governing authority [to] allow the Palestinians to conduct their own internal affairs, reduce points of friction between Israelis and Palestinians, and open a new era of cooperation and co-existence based on common interest, dignity and mutual respect. At the same time it protects Israel's vital interests, and in particular its security interests, both with regard to external security as well as the personal security of its citizens in the West Bank.

== Content of the agreement ==
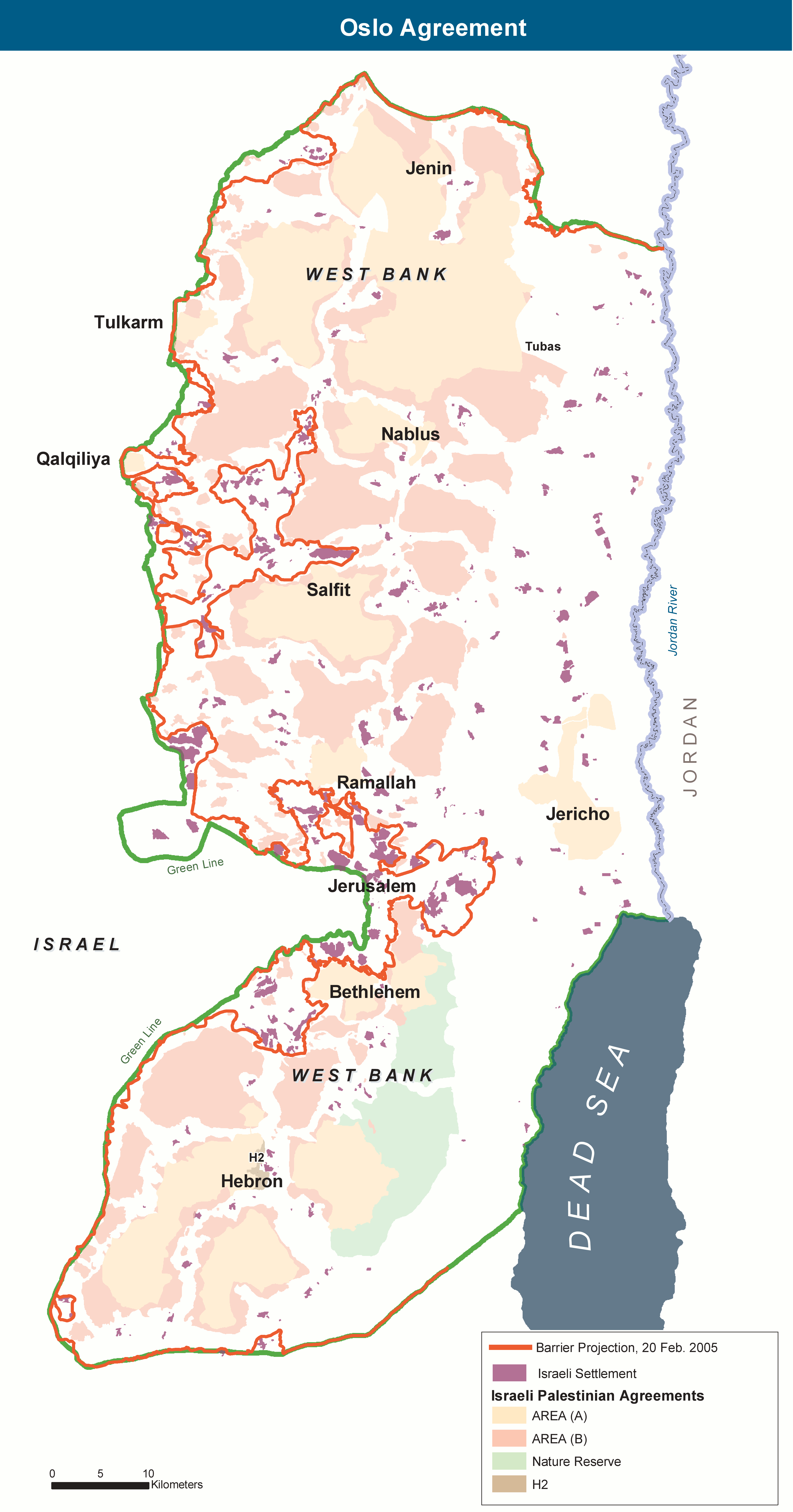
Map of the Areas. Red line: a projection of the route of the West Bank Barrier as approved on 20 February 2005.

The Interim Agreement comprises over 300 pages containing 5 "chapters" with 31 "articles", plus 7 "annexes" and 9 attached "maps". The agreement has a "preamble" acknowledging its roots in earlier diplomatic efforts of UN Security Council Resolution 242 (1967) and UN Security Council Resolution 338 (1973) the Madrid Conference of 1991 and the other prior agreements that came before it. Most significantly the agreement recognizes the establishment of a "Palestinian Interim Self-Government Authority," that is an elected Council, called "the Council" or "the Palestinian Council".

=== Chapter 1: The Palestinian Council ===
Consisting of Articles I–IX: The role and powers of a governing Palestinian "council" and committee dealing with civil affairs and the transfer of power from Israel to the Palestinian Council. The holding of elections, the structure of the Palestinian Council, and that it should contain 82 representatives, the executive authority of the Council, various other committees, that meetings of the council should be open to the public, and outlining the powers and responsibilities of the Council.

=== Chapter 2: Redeployment and security arrangements ===
Consisting of Articles X–XVI: Phases of the redeployment of the Israel Defense Forces, roles of the Israeli Security Forces and the Israeli police, perspectives on the land of the West Bank and Gaza Strip, definition of the Areas A, B and C dividing the West Bank, arrangements for security and public order, prevention of hostile acts, confidence-building measures, and the role of the Palestinian police:

The Palestinian police force established under the Gaza-Jericho Agreement will be fully integrated into the Palestinian Police and will be subject to the provisions of this Agreement. Except for the Palestinian Police and the Israeli military forces, no other armed forces shall be established or operate in the West Bank and the Gaza Strip.

=== Chapter 3: Legal affairs ===
Consisting of Articles XVII–XXI: The scope of the Palestinian Council's authority and jurisdiction and the resolution of conflicts, the legislative powers of the Council, that "Israel and the Council shall exercise their powers and responsibilities ... with due regard to internationally-accepted norms and principles of human rights and the rule of law", the various rights, liabilities and obligations with the transfer of powers and responsibilities from the Israeli military government and its civil administration to the Palestinian Council, dealing with financial claims, and the settlement of differences and disputes.

=== Chapter 4: Cooperation ===
Consisting of Articles XXII–XXVIII: Relations between Israel and the Council:

... shall accordingly abstain from incitement, including hostile propaganda, against each other ... that their respective educational systems contribute to the peace between the Israeli and Palestinian peoples and to peace in the entire region, and will refrain from the introduction of any motifs that could adversely affect the process of reconciliation ... cooperate in combating criminal activity which may affect both sides, including offenses related to trafficking in illegal drugs and psychotropic substances, smuggling, and offenses against property ...

The rules for economic relations as set out in the Protocol on Economic Relations, signed in Paris on April 29, 1994, cooperation programs that will hopefully be developed, the role and functioning of the Joint Israeli-Palestinian Liaison Committee set up as part of the Declaration of Principles (Oslo Accords 1993 and the setting up of a Monitoring and Steering Committee, liaison and cooperation with Jordan and Egypt, and locating and returning missing persons and soldiers missing in action.

=== Chapter 5: Miscellaneous provisions ===
Consisting of Articles XXIX–XXXI: Arrangements for safe passage of persons and transportation between the West Bank and the Gaza Strip, coordination between Israel and the Council regarding passage to and from Egypt and Jordan as well as any other agreed international crossings, and then the final clauses dealing with the signing of the agreement, its implementation, that the Gaza–Jericho Agreement (May 1994), the Preparatory Transfer Agreement (August 1994), and the Further Transfer Protocol (August 1995) will be superseded by this agreement, the need and timing of permanent status negotiations, and that:

The PLO undertakes that, within two months of the date of the inauguration of the Council, the Palestinian National Council will convene and formally approve the necessary changes in regard to the Palestinian Covenant, as undertaken in the letters signed by the Chairman of the PLO and addressed to the Prime Minister of Israel, dated September 9, 1993 and May 4, 1994.

Discussion about the release of Palestinian prisoners, agreement about the attached annexes and maps, and commencement of Israel's redeployment.

== See also ==
- Protocol on Economic Relations (Paris Protocol)
- Taxation in the Palestinian territories
- Oslo Accords (1993)
- 2000 Camp David Summit
- Israeli–Palestinian peace process
- The Environmental Provisions of Oslo II Accords
