= Protocol Concerning the Redeployment in Hebron =

Action regarding military deployment in Israel

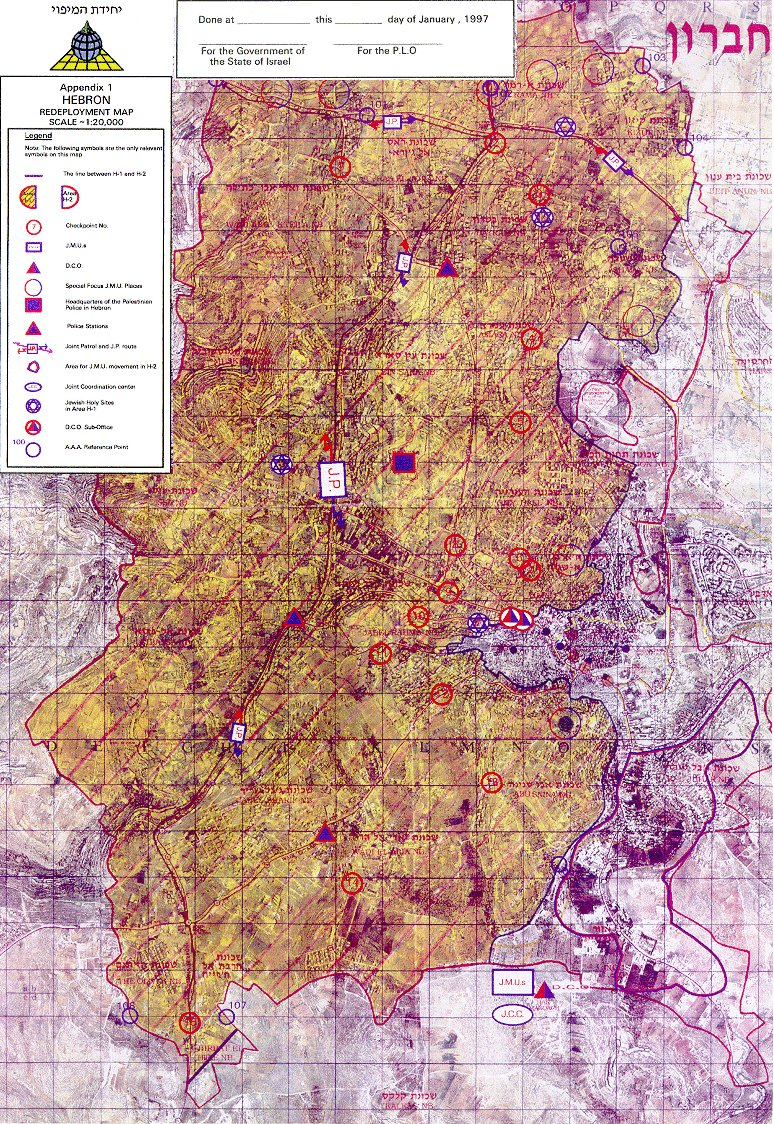
Official 1997 agreement map of Palestinian controlled H1 and Israeli controlled H2.

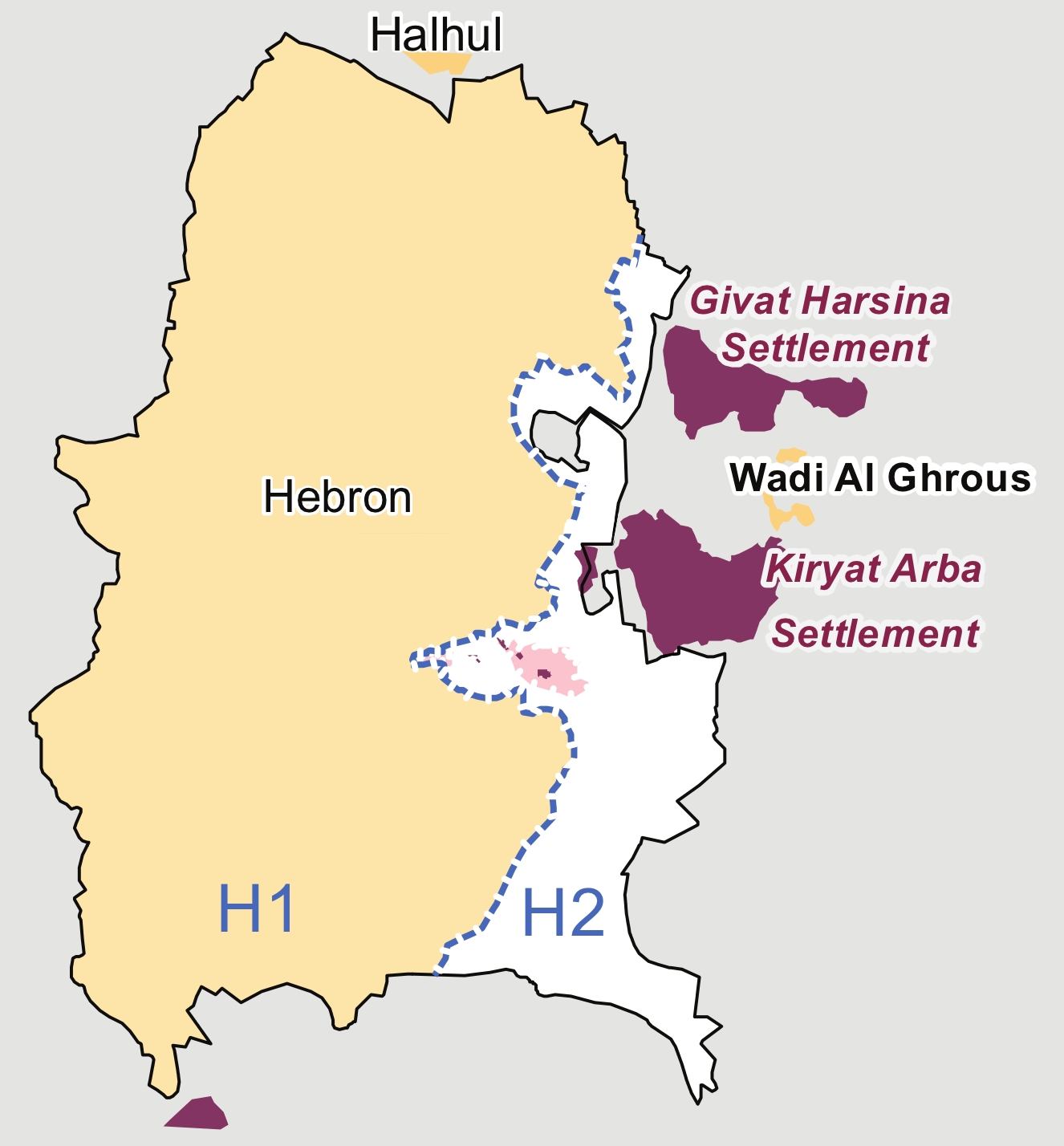
Illustration showing areas H1 and H2 and adjacent Israeli settlements

The Protocol Concerning the Redeployment in Hebron, also known as the Hebron Protocol or Hebron Agreement, was signed on 17 January 1997 by Israel, represented by Prime Minister of Israel Benjamin Netanyahu, and the Palestine Liberation Organization (PLO), represented by PLO Chairman Yasser Arafat, under the supervision of U.S. Secretary of State, Warren Christopher. It concerned the partial redeployment of Israeli military forces from Hebron in accordance with the 1995 Interim Agreement on the West Bank and the Gaza Strip ("Oslo II"). According to the Protocol, Area H-1 (about 80%) would come under Palestinian control, while Area H-2 would remain under Israeli control. A large Palestinian majority still lives in both Area H-1 and Area H-2. The redeployment started on 16 January 1997. The protocol has never been ratified by either of the contracting parties.

== Background ==
The Hebron Protocol initiated the third partial Israeli withdrawal, after the Gaza–Jericho Agreement, and the further withdrawal from populated Palestinian areas in the West Bank. Hebron was excepted from the other West Bank cities, who got the status of Area A in the Oslo II Accord. The withdrawal was originally scheduled for completion before 28 March 1996.

== Outline ==
On 7 January 1997, the parties agreed on some provisions concerning the Old City (Agreed Minute). On 13 January 1997, Prime Minister Netanyahu met with Chairman Arafat in the presence of U.S. envoy Dennis Ross. On 14 January, they made known that they had reached an agreement. On 15 January, the Palestinian Authority in a joint meeting with the Executive Committee of the PLO approved the document. The Israeli Cabinet also approved the document. The Knesset approved the Protocol on 16 January by a vote of 87 to 17, the Labor opposition voting with the government. The same day, the IDF began the redeployment from Hebron. The Hebron Protocol was signed on 17 January by Israeli chief negotiator General Dan Shomron and Palestinian negotiator Saeb Erekat. On 21 January, an agreement on the presence of an international monitoring group was signed.

The Agreements provided:

- An IDF withdrawal from 80% of Hebron within ten days.
- The division of Hebron into Area H-1 and Area H-2, and transfer of powers to the Palestinians
- The Hasbahe (wholesale market) with its shops would be opened and the Al-Shuhada Street completely reopened
- The first phase of further redeployments will be carried out during the first week of March
- Within two months after implementation of the Hebron Accord, Israel and the PA would begin negotiations on the permanent status agreement to be completed by 4 May 1999.

Before the Knesset, Prime Minister Netanyahu declared on 16 January with respect to the Protocol:

″But our goals are different [than those of the previous Governments]. We are using the time interval in the agreement to achieve our goals: to maintain the unity of Jerusalem, to ensure the security depth necessary for the defence of the State, to insist on the right of Jews to settle in their land, and to propose to the Palestinians a suitable arrangement for self-rule but without the sovereign Powers which pose a threat to the State of Israel.″

On 29 January, the Israeli Government granted Jewish enclaves in Hebron national priority “A” and “B” to receive special government funding for settlement building.

== Partial agreements ==
The protocol was a complex set of arrangements that consisted of a number of segments, in chronological order:

1. The Agreed Minute of 7 January 1997
2. The Note for the Record of 15 January 1997
3. The actual Protocol Concerning the Redeployment in Hebron of 17 January 1997
4. A Letter to be provided by U.S. Secretary of State Warren Christopher to Benjamin Netanyahu at the time of signing of the Hebron Protocol on 17 January 1997
5. An Agreement on Temporary International Presence in Hebron (TIPH) on 21 January 1997
6. A Memorandum of Understanding on the Establishment of a TIPH on 30 January 1997

=== Agreed Minute ===
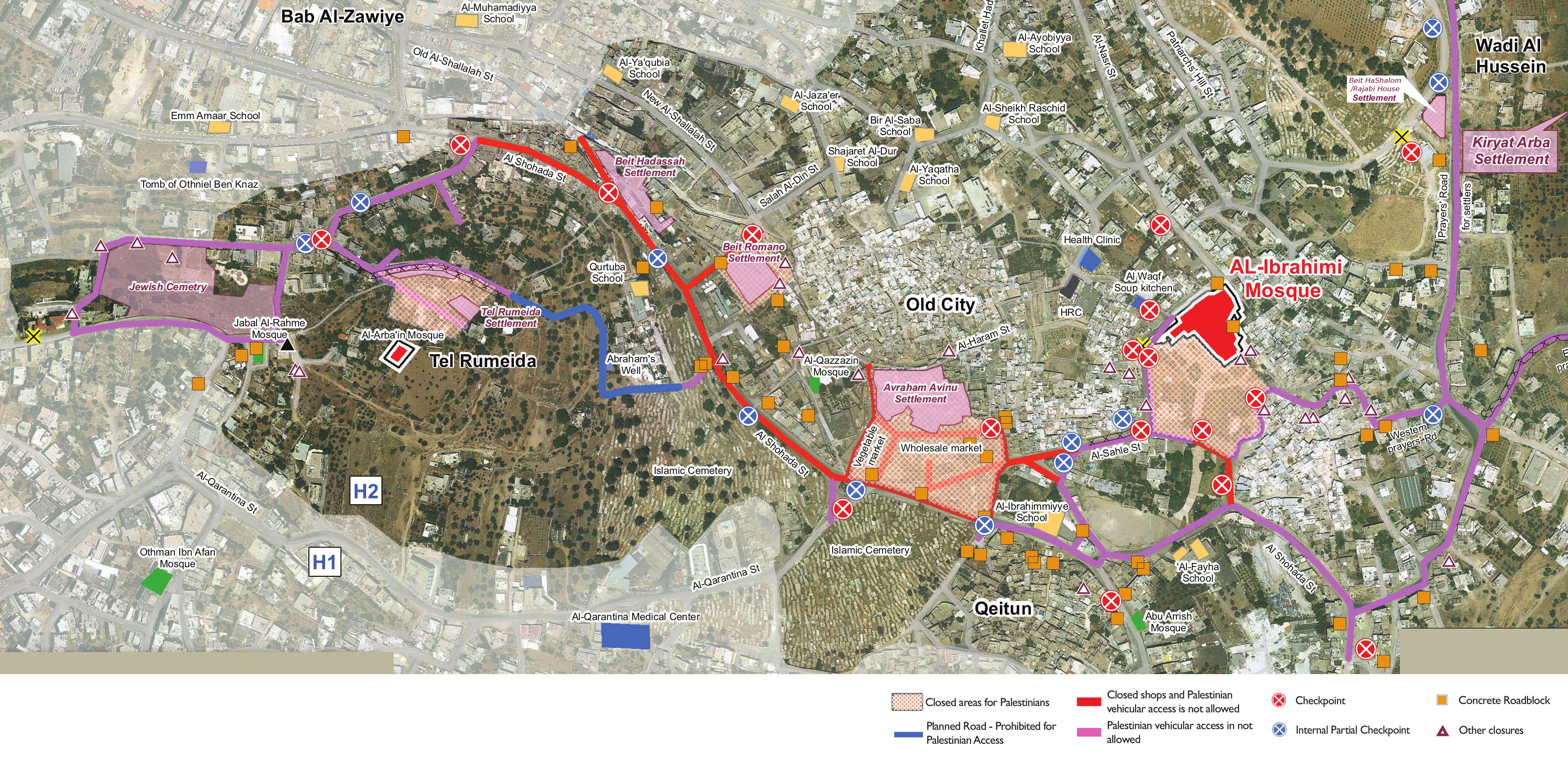
Map of the Shuhada Street, with closures as of 2011

The Agreed Minute was concluded on 7 January 1997, and in it Israeli Prime Minister Benjamin Netanyahu and PLO Chairman Yasser Arafat agreed that the process of reopening an important street in the West Bank town of Hebron, the al-Shuhada Street, would begin immediately, and would be completed within four months. This work would take place in conjunction with the implementation of the main Hebron Protocol.

=== Note for the Record ===
On 13 January 1997, the parties renewed talks on an agreement of troop withdrawal from Hebron, and a fixed timetable for withdrawals from the West Bank, mediated by King Hussein of Jordan. On 15 January 1997, Netanyahu and Arafat reached an agreement on the Protocol. U.S. envoy Dennis Ross drew up a "note for the record" to spell out the commitments. The partial Israeli withdrawal would begin within the next 10 days.

The two leaders agreed that the Oslo peace process must move forward to succeed and that they had concerns and obligations about the Interim Agreement on the West Bank and the Gaza Strip (Interim Agreement) of 1995. Accordingly, the two leaders reaffirmed their commitment to implement the Interim Agreement on the basis of reciprocity and, in that context, conveyed the following undertakings to each other:

Israeli responsibilities:

The Israeli side reaffirmed its commitments to further redeployment in phases. Prisoner release issues would be dealt with in accordance with the Interim Agreement's provisions. Negotiations on the following outstanding issues from the Interim Agreement would be immediately resumed in parallel: safe passage; Gaza Airport; Gaza port; passages; economic, financial, civilian and security issues. Permanent status negotiations would be resumed within two months after implementation of the Hebron Protocol.

Palestinian responsibilities:

The Palestinian side reaffirmed its commitments to: Complete the process of revising the Palestinian National Charter; Fighting terror and preventing violence; Strengthening security cooperation; Preventing incitement and hostile propaganda; Combat systematically and effectively terrorist organizations and infrastructure; Apprehension, prosecution and punishment of terrorists; Confiscation of illegal firearms. The size of Palestinian police would be in keeping with the Interim Agreement. Exercise of governmental activity, and location of Palestinian governmental offices, would be as specified in the Interim Agreement.

=== Protocol concerning the redeployment in Hebron ===
In accordance with the provisions of the Interim Agreement both parties agreed on this protocol for the implementation of the redeployment in Hebron on 17 January 1997. Among the provisions in the agreement included the following:

==== Security arrangements ====
1. The redeployment of the Israel Defense Forces in Hebron would be carried out in accordance with the Interim Agreement and the Protocol. Redeployment would be completed not later than ten days from the signing of this Protocol. During these ten days both sides would exert every possible effort to prevent friction.
2. The Palestinian police would assume responsibilities in Area H-1 similar to those in other cities in the West Bank; and Israel would retain all powers and responsibilities for internal security and public order in Area H-2. In addition, Israel would continue to carry the responsibility for overall security of Israelis.
3. Special security arrangements would apply adjacent to the areas under the security responsibility of Israel and in the area between the Palestinian police checkpoints.
4. Agreements about joint security measures calling for joint mobile units would be operating in this area, armed with equivalent types of light weapons.
5. Palestinian police stations or posts would be established manned by a total of up to 400 policemen, equipped with 20 vehicles and armed with 200 pistols, and 100 rifles for the protection of the police stations.
6. Protection of holy sites: The Cave of Othniel Ben Knaz/El-Khalil; Elonei Mamre/Haram Er-Rameh; Eshel Avraham/Balotat Ibrahim; and Maayan Sarah/Ein Sarah. The Palestinian Police would be responsible for the protection of the above Jewish holy sites.
7. Both sides reiterated their commitment to maintain normal life throughout the city of Hebron and to prevent any provocation or friction that may affect the normal life in the city.
8. The Imara would be turned over to the Palestinian side upon the completion of the redeployment and would become the headquarters of the Palestinian police in the city of Hebron.
9. Both sides reiterate their commitment to the unity of the City of Hebron, and their understanding that the division of security responsibility would not divide the city.

==== Civil arrangements and transfer of civil powers ====
1. The transfer of civil powers and responsibilities that had yet to be transferred to the Palestinian side in the city of Hebron in accordance with the Interim Agreement would be conducted concurrently with the beginning of the redeployment of Israeli military forces in Hebron.
2. The two parties were equally committed to preserve and protect the historic character of the city in a way which does not harm or change that character in any part of the city. The Palestinian side had informed the Israeli side that in exercising its powers and responsibilities, it was taking into account the existing municipal regulations especially concerning construction regulations.
3. The Palestinian side would inform the Israeli side, 48 hours in advance of any anticipated activity regarding infrastructure which might disturb the regular flow of traffic on roads. The Israeli side might request, through the DCL, that the Municipality carry out works regarding the roads or other infrastructure required for the well-being of the Israelis in some areas.
4. The Palestinian side would have the power to determine bus stops, traffic arrangements and traffic signalization in the city of Hebron.
5. Plainclothes unarmed municipal inspectors would be on duty.
6. Municipal services would be provided regularly and continuously to all parts of the city of Hebron, at the same quality and cost. The cost would be determined by the Palestinian side with respect to work done and materials consumed, without discrimination.

==== Miscellaneous ====
1. There would be a Temporary International Presence in Hebron (TIPH). Both sides would agree on the modalities of the TIPH, including the number of its members and its area of operation.

=== Letter from Secretary of State Christopher ===
At the time of signing of the Hebron Protocol, United States Secretary of State Warren Christopher provided a letter to Benjamin Netanyahu. In the letter, he explained the policy of the United States to support and promote full implementation of the Interim Agreement.

He had impressed upon Arafat the need for the Palestinian Authority to ensure public order and internal security within the West Bank and Gaza Strip. The US believed that the first phase of further redeployments should take place as soon as possible, and that all three phases of the further redeployments should be completed within twelve months from the implementation of the first phase of the further redeployments but not later than mid-1998.

Christopher also emphasized the US' commitment to Israel's security and the US' position that Israel is entitled to secure and defensible borders, which should be directly negotiated and agreed with its neighbours.

=== Agreement on the Temporary International Presence ===
The Hebron protocol brought in the Temporary International Presence in Hebron (TIPH) as a third part. On 21 January 1997, the parties signed the "Agreement on the Temporary International Presence in the City of Hebron". A non-military international monitoring group of 180 persons would be established in Hebron. The agreement would replace the temporary agreement of 9 May 1996.

The 1996 agreement had provided that as part of the redeployment of Israeli military forces in the West Bank and the Gaza Strip, there would the establishment of a Temporary International Presence in Hebron (TIPH). In the 1996 agreement, the two sides invited Norway to send a group of 50–60 Norwegians to act as an "advance TIPH" preparing for the new TIPH to be established following the redeployment. The Norwegian personnel arrived and commenced their operation. When the Hebron negotiations were completed and signed, it also provided that the TIPH would consist of up to 180 persons from Norway, Italy, Denmark, Sweden, Switzerland and Turkey, with Norway being responsible for the coordination of the TIPH's activity.

The task of the TIPH was to monitor and report on efforts to maintain normal life in Hebron, to provide a feeling of security among the Palestinians of Hebron and to help promote stability. In addition, the TIPH personnel were to assist in the promotion and execution of projects, to encourage economic development and growth in the city and to provide reports. The TIPH had no military or police functions.

The TIPH members were identifiable by their distinctive khaki uniforms and the special emblem on their uniforms and vehicles. Practical aspects of their operation and activity were set out in a memorandum of understanding concluded by the participating countries with the agreement of the two sides.
