= Wye River Memorandum =

1998 step in the Israel-Palestinian peace process

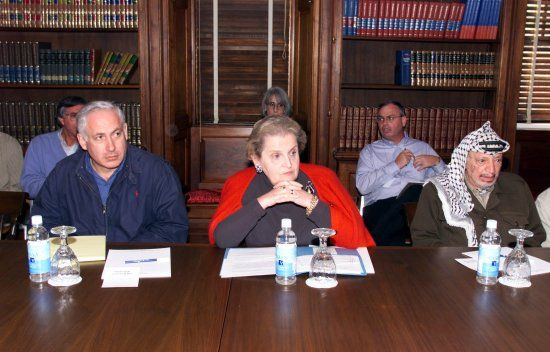
Israeli Prime Minister Benjamin Netanyahu (left), U.S. Secretary of State Madeleine Albright, and Yasser Arafat at the Wye River Memorandum, October 1998

The Wye River Memorandum was an agreement negotiated between Israel and the Palestinian Authority at a summit in Wye River, Maryland, U.S., held 15–23 October 1998. The Memorandum aimed to resume the implementation of the 1995 Interim Agreement on the West Bank and the Gaza Strip (Oslo II Accord). It was signed in the White House by Benjamin Netanyahu and Yasser Arafat, through negotiations led by U.S. President Bill Clinton, on 23 October 1998. On 17 November 1998 Israel's 120-member parliament, the Knesset, approved the Memorandum by a vote of 75–19. The Memorandum determined that it would enter into force on 2 November 1998, ten days from the date of signature.

On 18 December 1998, the Clinton administration and the European Union declared their contentment about the implementation of the first phase of the Memorandum by both sides. However, by this point the Palestinian Islamic Jihad had carried out a fatal terrorist attack in Jerusalem, and Israel had only implemented stage 1 of the further redeployment (F.R.D.), meaning that it had withdrawn from 2% of Area C instead of the required 13%. Both parties accused each other of not fulfilling its share of responsibilities under the Wye River Memorandum, and the further implementation of the agreement remained unfinished.

== Summit ==
The summit was brokered by the United States at the Aspen Institute Wye River Conference Centers near Wye Mills, Maryland, U.S. President Bill Clinton opened the summit at the secluded Wye River Conference Center on 15 October, and returned at least six times to the site to press Netanyahu and Arafat to finalize the deal. In the final push to get Netanyahu and Arafat to overcome remaining obstacles, Clinton invited King Hussein who had played a past role in easing tensions between the two men, to join the talks.

On the final day of the negotiations, the agreement almost fell through. Israeli Prime Minister Benjamin Netanyahu had asked President Bill Clinton to release Jonathan Pollard, an American naval intelligence officer who has been serving a life sentence since 1985 for giving classified information to Israel. A bitter disagreement arose, with Netanyahu claiming that Clinton had promised to release Pollard, and Clinton saying he had only promised to "review" the case. It was reported that then-Director of the CIA George Tenet had threatened to resign should Pollard be released.

The agreement was finally signed by Netanyahu and PLO Chairman Yasser Arafat at the White House, with President Clinton playing a key role as the official witness.

== Background ==
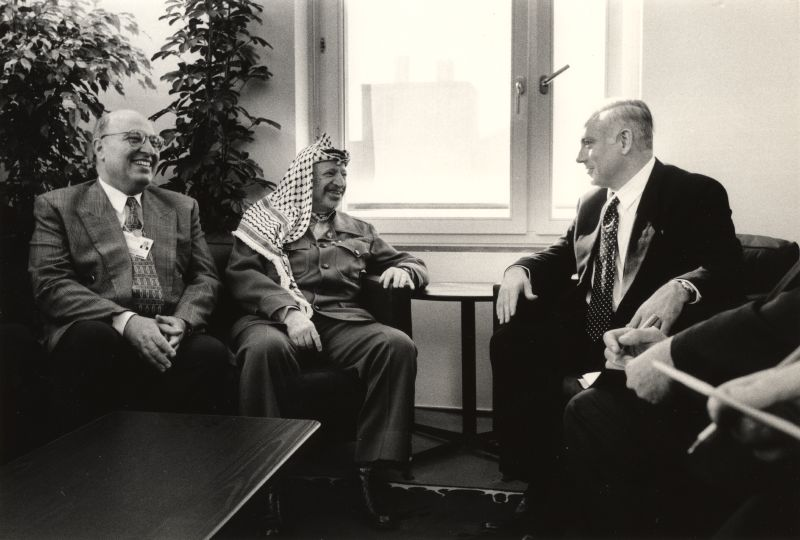
Nabil Shaath and Palestinian leader Yasser Arafat meeting Israeli Prime Minister Benjamin Netanyahu in Davos in 1997

For the implementation of the Oslo II Accord and to facilitate the Israeli withdrawal from parts of the West Bank, Israel and the Palestinian Authorities signed a number of agreements and protocols. The documents contained the reciprocal responsibilities, including those relating to further redeployments and security.

In 1994, the "Agreement on Preparatory Transfer of Powers and Responsibilities Between Israel and the PLO" was signed. In 1995, the "Protocol on Further Transfer of Powers and Responsibilities" followed. The 1997 Hebron Protocol settled the withdrawal from 80% of Hebron and its division into two Areas.

== Redeployments ==
The Further Redeployments (F.R.D.) in the Wye River Memorandum refer to the three phases in Appendix 1 of Annex I of the Oslo II Accord, which would follow the previous redeployment from populated areas in the West Bank. Only the phases 1 and 2 are specified. Phase 3 was delegated to a "Third further redeployment committee" which was to be started.

=== Phase one and two of the further redeployments ===
The Phases one and two, not specified in the Oslo II Accord, comprised the transfer to the Palestinians of 13% from Area C and shifts of parts of Area B to Area A. The redeployment was divided into three stages, specified in the "Time line".

- Stage 1 (November 1998): 2% from Area C to B; 7.1% from B to A
- Stage 2 (December 1998): 5% from Area C to B
- Stage 3 (January 1999): 5% from Area C to B; 1% from C to A; 7.1% from B to A

In total, 13% would thus be transferred from Area C. Area B would increase with 13% and Area A with 14%.

If the Memorandum had been implemented, Area C would theoretically have been reduced from circa 74% to 61%. Article I, however, determined that 3% of Area B would be designated as Nature Reserves with full Israeli control, meaning that the Palestinians would neither have free access to it, nor could build new constructions. This specification was a result of a misunderstanding regarding Prime Minister Netanyahu's "bottom line" for Israeli territorial withdrawal. He told American negotiator Dennis Ross he could go as high as the "lowest teen" in percentage of territory, and Ross persuaded Chairman Arafat to accept the 13% figure. Later, Netanyahu insisted he had meant 11% withdrawal, so Ross surfaced the idea of using the nature reserves to bridge the 11% and 13% figures.

== Security ==
In the provisions on security arrangements of the Interim Agreement, the Palestinian side agreed to take all measures necessary in order to prevent acts of terrorism, crime and hostilities directed against the Israeli side, against individuals falling under the Israeli side's authority and against their property, just as the Israeli side agreed to take all measures necessary in order to prevent acts of terrorism, crime and hostilities directed against the Palestinian side, against individuals falling under the Palestinian side's authority and against their property. The two sides also agreed to take legal measures against offenders within their jurisdiction and to prevent incitement against each other by any organizations, groups or individuals within their jurisdiction.

=== A: Security actions ===
==== 1: Outlawing and combating terrorist organizations ====
(a) The Palestinian side was to make known its policy of zero tolerance for terror and violence against both sides. (b) A work plan developed by the Palestinian side would be shared with the U.S. and thereafter implementation would begin immediately to ensure the systematic and effective combat of terrorist organizations and their infrastructure. (c) In addition to the bilateral Israeli–Palestinian security cooperation, a U.S.–Palestinian committee would meet biweekly to review the steps being taken to eliminate terrorists cells and the support structure that plans, finances, supplies and abets terror. (d) The Palestinian side would apprehend the specific individuals suspected of perpetrating acts of violence and terror for the purpose of further investigation, and prosecution and punishment of all persons involved in acts of violence and terror. (e) A U.S.–Palestinian committee would meet to review and evaluate information pertinent to the decisions on prosecution, punishment or other legal measures which affect the status of individuals suspected of abetting or perpetrating acts of violence and terror.

==== 2: Prohibiting illegal weapons ====
(a) The Palestinian side would ensure an effective legal framework is in place to criminalize, in conformity with the prior agreements, any importation, manufacturing or unlicensed sale, acquisition or possession of firearms, ammunition or weapons in areas under Palestinian jurisdiction. (b) In addition, the Palestinian side would establish and vigorously and continuously implement a systematic program for the collection and appropriate handling of all such illegal items it accordance with the prior agreements. The U.S. agreed to assist in carrying out the program. (c) A U.S.–Palestinian–Israeli committee would be established to assist and enhance cooperation in preventing the smuggling or other unauthorized introduction of weapons or explosive materials into areas under Palestinian jurisdiction.

==== 3: Prevention of incitement ====
(a) The Palestinian side would issue a decree prohibiting all forms of incitement to violence or terror, and establishing mechanisms for acting systematically against all expressions or threats of violence or terror. This decree would be comparable to the existing Israeli legislation which deals with the same subject. (b) A U.S.–Palestinian–Israeli committee would meet on a regular basis to monitor cases of possible incitement to violence or terror and to make recommendations and reports on how to prevent such incitement. The Israeli, Palestinian and U.S. sides would each appoint a media specialist, a law enforcement representative, an educational specialist and a current or former elected official to the committee.

=== B: Security cooperation ===
The two sides agreed that their security cooperation would be based on a spirit of partnership and would include, among other things, the following steps:

==== 1: Bilateral cooperation ====
There would be full bilateral security cooperation between the two sides which would be continuous, intensive and comprehensive.

==== 2: Forensic cooperation ====
There would be an exchange of forensic expertise, training, and other assistance.

==== 3: Trilateral committee ====
In addition to the bilateral Israeli–Palestinian security cooperation, a high-ranking U.S.–Palestinian–Israeli committee would meet as required and not less than biweekly to assess current threats to deal with any impediments to effective security cooperation and coordination and address the steps being taken to combat terror and terrorist organizations.

=== C: Other security issues ===
==== 1: Palestinian police force ====
(a) The Palestinian side would provide a list of its policemen to the Israeli side in conformity with the prior agreements. (b) Should the Palestinian side request technical assistance, the U.S. indicated its willingness to help meet those needs in cooperation with other donors. (c) The Monitoring and Steering Committee would, as part of its functions, monitor the implementation of this provision and brief the U.S.

==== 2: PLO charter ====
The Executive Committee of the Palestine Liberation Organization and the Palestinian Central Council should reaffirm the letter of 22 January 1998 from PLO Chairman Yasir Arafat to President Clinton concerning the nullification of the Palestinian National Charter provisions that were inconsistent with the letters exchanged between the PLO and the Government of Israel on 9–10 September 1993.

==== 3: Legal assistance in criminal matters ====
Among other forms of legal assistance in criminal matters, there were requests for the arrest and transfer of suspects and defendants. The United States had been requested by the sides to report on a regular basis on the steps being taken to respond to the above requests.

==== 4: Human rights and the rule of law ====
Accepted norms of human rights and the rule of law, and would be guided by the need to protect the public, respect human dignity, and avoid harassment.

== Economic issues ==
1. The Israeli and Palestinian sides reaffirmed their commitment to improve their relationship and agreed on the need to actively promote economic development in the West Bank and Gaza Strip.
2. The Israeli and Palestinian sides agreed on arrangements which would permit the timely opening of the Gaza Industrial Estate.
3. Both sides should have renewed negotiations on Safe Passage immediately. Negotiations on the northern route would continue with the goal of reaching agreement as soon as possible.
4. The Israeli and Palestinian sides acknowledged the great importance of the Port of Gaza for the development of the Palestinian economy, and the expansion of Palestinian trade.
5. The two sides recognized that unresolved legal issues hurt the relationship between the two peoples.
6. The Israeli and Palestinian sides also should launch a strategic economic dialogue to enhance their economic relationship.
7. The two sides agreed on the importance of continued international donor assistance in helping both sides to implement agreements.

== Permanent status negotiations ==
The two sides would immediately resume permanent status negotiations on an accelerated basis and will make a determined effort to achieve the mutual goal of reaching an agreement by 4 May 1999.

== Unilateral actions ==
Recognizing the necessity to create a positive environment for the negotiations, neither side should initiate or take any step that would change the status of the West Bank and the Gaza Strip in accordance with the Interim Agreement.

== Political impact in Israel ==
The Wye agreement was broadly popular in Israel, with 74% of Israelis supporting the agreement according to early-November polling. However, Prime Minister Netanyahu sensed opposition within his Likud party and delayed a vote of cabinet approval while he sought public assurances from the Clinton administration about the implementation of Wye. Rather than join a national unity government with opposition leader Ehud Barak, Netanyahu tried to assuage Likud hardliners by stopping implementation of Wye in early December over confrontations between Palestinian protesters and Israeli soldiers. Disapproval of Netanyahu's policies from Barak's Labor Party and the Likud right resulted in a vote of no confidence against his government that prompted general elections in May 1999; Barak was victorious and pledged to continue the Israeli–Palestinian peace process.
