= Gaza–Jericho Agreement =

1994 follow-up treaty to the Oslo I Accord

The Gaza–Jericho Agreement, officially called Agreement on the Gaza Strip and the Jericho Area, was a follow-up treaty to the Oslo I Accord in which details of Palestinian autonomy were concluded. The agreement is commonly known as the 1994 Cairo Agreement. It was signed on 4 May 1994 by Yasser Arafat and the then Israeli Prime Minister Yitzhak Rabin.

== History ==
The Agreement provided for limited Palestinian self-rule in the West Bank and Gaza Strip within five years. Pursuant to the Agreement, Israel promised to withdraw partly from the Jericho region in the West Bank and partly from the Gaza Strip, within three weeks of signing. The Palestinian Authority (PA) was created by the Agreement (Article III, Transfer of Authority), and Yasser Arafat became the first president of the PA on 5 July 1994 upon the formal inauguration of the PA.

Other parts of the agreement were the Protocol on Economic Relations (Paris Protocol) and the establishment of the Palestinian Civil Police Force. The Paris Protocol regulates the economic relationship between Israel and the Palestinian Authority, but in effect integrates the Palestinian economy into the Israeli one.

The agreement was incorporated into and superseded by the Oslo II Accord, formally known as the Interim Agreement on the West Bank and the Gaza Strip of 24 and 28 September 1995 (Oslo II, Article XXXI, Final Clauses).

== See also ==
- Protocol Concerning the Redeployment in Hebron
- Wye River Memorandum
