= Protocol on Economic Relations =

1994 agreement between Israel and the Palestine Liberation Organization

The Protocol on Economic Relations, also called the Paris Protocol, was an agreement between Israel and the Palestine Liberation Organization, signed on 29 April 1994, and incorporated with minor amendments into the Oslo II Accord of September 1995.

== Position in the agreements ==
The Protocol, itself signed on 29 April 1994, was part of the Gaza–Jericho Agreement, which was signed in Paris five days later on 4 May 1994. The Gaza–Jericho Agreement simultaneously established the Palestinian Authority (PA), which is responsible for the Palestinian obligations concerning the Paris Protocol. The Protocol is mentioned in Article XIII of the Gaza–Jericho Agreement and attached to it as Annex IV with the full name "Protocol on Economic Relations between the Government of the State of Israel and the P.L.O., representing the Palestinian people". It was incorporated with minor emendations into the Oslo II Accord of September 1995.

In the Oslo II Accord, the Paris Protocol is incorporated in Article XXIV. The amendments to the Protocol (Supplement to the Protocol on Economic Relations) were annexed as Annex V of the Oslo II Accord and contain only some changes on the clearance of revenues and some technical changes on the taxes issue. While the Protocol initially applied to the Gaza Strip and the Jericho Area, its jurisdiction was extended to all of the Palestinian territories in the Oslo II Accord.

== Consequences ==
Originally, the Paris Protocol was to remain in force for an interim period of five years. As of 2016, however, the Protocol was still applicable. The limited time the agreement was supposed to be operative helped encourage Palestinian negotiators to sign it, to be the first step to make progress. More importantly, Israel made acceptance of the Protocol a condition for Israel's continuing to allow the tens of thousands of Palestinians to work in Israel.

Essentially, the Protocol integrated the Palestinian economy into the Israeli one through a customs union, with Israel to control all borders, both its own and those of the Palestinian Authority. Palestine remains without independent gates to the world economy. The Protocol regulates the relationship and interaction between Israel and the Palestinian Authority in six major areas: customs, taxes, labor, agriculture, industry and tourism.

Since Hamas’ takeover of the Gaza Strip, and the Israeli blockade of the Gaza Strip, the Protocol cannot be fully applied to the Strip. However, Gaza importers still pay Israel customs, VAT and purchase taxes on goods that they import via Israel.

The Protocol determines that Israeli currency, the New Israeli Shekel (NIS), is used in the Palestinian territories as a circulating currency which legally serves there as means of payment for all purposes and to be accepted by the Palestinian Authority and by all its institutions, local authorities and banks. The Palestinians are not allowed to independently introduce a separate Palestinian currency. Imports from and exports to third countries, including quantitative restrictions are subject to Israeli supervision and the Protocol gave Israel sole control over the external borders and collection of import taxes and VAT. According to the agreement, Palestinian trade with other countries would continue to be handled through Israeli sea and air ports, or through border crossings between the Palestinian Authority and Jordan and Egypt, which at the time were both controlled by Israel. As of 2016, the Rafah Border Crossing is controlled by Egypt, but Egypt has largely supported blockading the Gaza Strip since Hamas's rise to power following the Battle of Gaza in 2007.

== Tax system ==
A major part of the 1994 Paris Protocol is the tax system, the backbone of the customs union. Israel collects and transfers to the Palestinian Authority the import taxes on goods that were intended for the Palestinian territories. Israel may unilaterally establish and change the taxes imposed on imported goods. If Israel raises its VAT, Palestine has to follow it.

Israel transfers the collected tax revenue for goods and services sold in Israel and intended for consumption in the Palestinian territories. Israel also collects income taxes from Palestinians employed in Israel and the Israeli settlements. Pursuant to the Protocol, Israel withholds 25% of these income taxes by default (not from Palestinians employed in settlements). Additionally, 3% of the total revenue is levied as collection and processing fees.

=== Tax clearance system as means of pressure ===
Tax clearance is the largest source of Palestinian public income. In 2014, it accounted for 75% of the total revenue. Israel collects taxes on Palestinian imports, and national insurance and income taxes from labor on behalf of the PA and transfers the results on a monthly basis. This makes the PA vulnerable to unilateral suspension of clearance revenue transfers by Israel. In 2014-2015, the revenue was about $160 million per month.

As early as 1997, Israel began to unilaterally settle bills unpaid by Palestinians, not the PA itself, including fines and interests. Political reasons for suspension varied from Palestinian violence to the election of Hamas into PA, reconciliation between Fatah and Hamas and the demand for international recognition.

== See also ==
- Oslo Accords
- Taxation in the Palestinian territories
- Israeli–Palestinian conflict
- Middle East economic integration
- List of Paris meetings, agreements and declarations
