= Corruption (play) =

2024 play by J. T. Rogers

- Written by: J. T. Rogers
- Original language: English
- Subject: 2011 Hacking scandal
- Genre: Drama

Premiere
- Date premiered: February 15, 2024
- Place premiered: Mitzi E. Newhouse Theater

Corruption is a play by J. T. Rogers, recounting (in dramatized form) the true-life phone hacking scandal that engulfed Rupert Murdoch’s media empire in 2011, stunning the world and upending British politics. The production is based on the 2012 book Dial M for Murdoch. The play premiered Off-Broadway in February 2024 at the Mitzi E. Newhouse Theatre at Lincoln Center. The play was directed by Bartlett Sher, who previously directed Rogers' previous play Oslo (2016) which won the Tony Award for Best Play.

== Overview ==
The play set in 2011 revolves around parliament member Tom Watson who gets quickly engulfed into the News International phone hacking scandal. Watson is on a mission to investigate those behind the hacking while balancing his personal life. Various figures involved in the story include Rebekah Brooks, James Murdoch, and Gordon Brown.

== Origins ==
J.T. Rogers adapted the play from the 2012 book Dial M for Murdoch: News Corporation and the Corruption of Britain by British Labour Party MP Tom Watson, and Martin Hickman, a journalist with The Independent newspaper. This is the third collaboration between playwright Rogers and director Sher who previously worked together on Blood and Gifts (2010) and Oslo (2016). Of working with Sher, Rogers stated, "There is no one who stages plays better in American theatre".

== Productions ==
=== Off-Broadway ===
The world premiere production will open on March 11, 2024, at Lincoln Center Theater's Mitzi E. Newhouse Theater following previews from February 15. It was directed by Bartlett Sher who previously collaborated with J.T. Rogers with his play Oslo which won the Tony Award for Best Play. The production stars Toby Stephens as MP Tom Watson, Baron Watson of Wyre Forest and Dylan Baker as Tom Crone and Glenn Mulcaire. The rest of the cast includes Saffron Burrows, Seth Numrich, Anthony Cochrane, and K. Todd Freeman.

== Cast and characters ==
Character	Off Broadway, Lincoln Center (2024)
Tom Watson	Toby Stephens
Tom Crone / Glenn Mulcaire	Dylan Baker
Rebekah Brooks	Saffron Burrows
James Murdoch	Seth Numrich
Gordon Brown	Anthony Cochrane
Charlie Brooks / Jeremy Hunt	John Behlmann
Siobhan Watson / Surrogate	Robyn Kerr
Chris Bryant / Simon Kelner	K. Todd Freeman
Karie / Sue Akers / Jo Becker	Eleanor Handley
Max Mosley / John Whittingdale / John Bercow	Michael Siberry
Charlotte Harris	Sepideh Moafi
