= Tokyo Vice =

2009 memoir by Jake Adelstein

- Author: Jake Adelstein
- Language: English
- Genre: Memoir
- Publisher: Random House; Pantheon Books
- Publication date: 2009
- Publication place: Japan; United States
- Media type: Print eBook
- Pages: 352
- ISBN: 978-0-307-37879-8
- OCLC: 699874898

Tokyo Vice: An American Reporter on the Police Beat in Japan is a 2009 memoir by Jake Adelstein of his years living in Tokyo as the first non-Japanese reporter working for one of Japan's largest newspapers, the Yomiuri Shimbun. It was published by Random House and Pantheon Books. Max adapted the memoir into a 2022 television series. An investigation by The Hollywood Reporter questioned whether certain events in the book happened as stated.

== Synopsis ==
The account covers Adelstein's career in Tokyo, starting in 1993 when he was hired as a rookie reporter for Yomiuri Shimbun. As a cadet, He describes how in Japan journalists are hired for newspapers straight after graduating from university and how he applied to the Yomiuri Shimbun on 12 July 1992 in his fourth year of university. He describes being taken under the wing of Sekiguchi, an older detective. Adelstein was initially assigned to "tacky" Urawa, and the memoir covers his next 12 years as a staffer for the paper, describing 80-hour work weeks, relationship difficulties, and the interactions between crime reporters and the police. Specific cases involve the search for the killer of Lucie Blackman, and the memoir also details death threats after he published an expose on Tadamasa Goto. He also uncovered that Saitama Prefecture was altering scientific data on dioxin contamination.

Adelstein wrote that the yakuza are considered a "necessary evil" and as a "second police force" that upholds public order. He also wrote that the yakuza have "deep if murky" links to the ruling Liberal Democratic Party. Sekiguchi told Adelstein that the yakuza did not use that term to describe themselves, and instead call themselves gokudo, a portmanteau of goku (extreme) and do (the path). He described himself as a failure at a host club, writing that Japanese women wanted "an attractive Japanese man, not a goofy Jewish-American in an expensive suit". About the Blackman case, he wrote "how did this man get away with allegedly raping woman after woman for more more than a decade, and why didn't the police catch him sooner?"

He described the Japanese attitude towards World War Two as "apparently not knowing history means never having to say you're sorry". He wrote that the best way to get a scoop was to blackmail the investigating detective. He described how he took a photograph of a drawing of a suspect in a police station surreptitiously, which he used to blackmail a detective to give him a scoop about a thief.

== History ==
Tokyo Vice: An American Reporter on the Police Beat in Japan is a 2009 memoir by Jake Adelstein of his years living in Tokyo as the first non-Japanese reporter working for one of Japan's largest newspapers. He initially had a deal to release the book in Japan. However, after Adelstein wrote an expose for the Washington Post concerning the FBI granting visas to yakuza members, Adelstein sought police protection in 2009 and left the country.

Adelstein wrote in 2013 that: "The book is translated into Japanese but no publisher will touch it. It steps on too many toes." He described how in September 2008, the Japanese publisher "got cold feet and backed out." Stated Adelstein, "a risk assessment was done and the conclusion at the time was that publishing the book could result in unpleasant things like arson, dump trucks being smashed into the (publisher's) building, and the kidnapping of the publisher's employees and other acts of violence... I don't blame them for opting out." He wrote that the English version and Japanese version, which he wrote without a translator, are essentially the same, but with sources "more obscured" in the Japanese version. After trying and failing to have the book published in Japan, it was published by Random House and Pantheon Books. Kirkus Reviews called it "Not just a hard-boiled true-crime thriller, but an engrossing, troubling look at crime and human exploitation in Japan."

== Controversy over accuracy ==
After the release of the TV series, The Hollywood Reporter published an article on people involved in the Japanese newspaper business and American entertainment industry casting doubts on the veracity of the stories published in the book. American television producer Philip Day recalled that, in 2010, while shooting a documentary for National Geographic, he felt Adelstein was not credible, citing one incident where Adelstein called him to say he had been attacked by a yakuza in the street with a phone book. A lawsuit was brought in 2011 by Adelstein after he claimed that the production interviewing three different gangsters led to threats on his life. Adelstein's former colleague at the Yomiuri, Tsujii, maintained that the atmosphere of brawling and going undercover were not tolerated. Adelstein stated in the article, "Nothing in the book is exaggerated. Everything is written as it happened." After the THR article was published, Adelstein published a response stating, "Mr. Blair deliberately left out or ignored correspondences testifying to my credibility or verifying my reporting", arguing the piece focused too much on the 2011 lawsuit and was inaccurate about keeping sources anonymous, and releasing a collection of documents and sources on Twitter stated to be from the making of the book.

== Film adaptation ==
In August 2013 a film adaptation of the memoir was announced. Adelstein co-wrote the story for the film version of Tokyo Vice with American playwright J. T. Rogers, and Rogers then wrote the screenplay. Anthony Mandler was announced to direct the film, with John Lesher and Adam Kassan serving as producers, and Binn Jakupi serving as an executive producer. The film was expected to begin filming in Tokyo in mid-2015, with Daniel Radcliffe set to play Adelstein. Production never commenced.

== Television adaptation ==
In June 2019, a television adaptation of the memoir was announced. The 8-part television series stars Ansel Elgort playing Jake Adelstein, an American journalist who embeds himself into the Tokyo Vice police squad to reveal corruption. The series also stars Ken Watanabe and is written and executive produced by Tony Award-winning playwright J. T. Rogers, with Endeavor Content serving as the studio. In October 2019, it was announced that Michael Mann would direct the pilot episode and would serve as executive producer, which he did. John Lesher, Emily Gerson Saines, and Destin Daniel Cretton also serve as executive producers, alongside J. T. Rogers, Mann, Elgort and Watanabe.

In addition to Elgort and Watanabe, the Tokyo Vice cast also includes Rachel Keller and Ella Rumpf.

The series premiered on April 7, 2022, on HBO Max, with the first three episodes available immediately, followed by two episodes on a weekly basis until the season finale on April 28.

== See also ==
- Homicide: A Year on the Killing Streets, by David Simon
- Cop in the Hood: My Year Policing Baltimore's Eastern District, by Peter Moskos
