= J. T. Rogers =

American dramatist (born 1968)

- Rogers in 2026
- Education: University of North Carolina School of the Arts (BFA)
- Writing career
- Genre: Drama
- Notable works: Blood and Gifts; Oslo; Corruption

J. T. Rogers (born May 20, 1968) is an American playwright and screenwriter. He is best known for his play Oslo (2016) about the 1990s Oslo Peace Accords between Israel and Palestine. The play received widespread acclaim as well as the Tony Award, Drama Desk Award, and Obie Award for Best Play. He is also known for his plays Madagascar (2004),The Overwhelming (2006), Blood and Gifts (2010), and Corruption (2024).

Rogers wrote the Critics Choice Award-winning HBO film of Oslo (2021) which he executive produced along with by Steven Spielberg. It also received two Primetime Emmy Award nominations. Rogers created, wrote and served as the showrunner for the HBO Max television series Tokyo Vice (2022–2024).

== Early life and education ==
Rogers grew up in South East Asia and attended Rock Bridge High School in Columbia, Missouri, and graduated from the University of North Carolina School of the Arts in 1990, where he studied acting. He also received an honorary doctorate from UNCSA in 2009.

== Career ==
=== 2004–2009: Early works ===
J. T. Rogers' play Madagascar is set in a hotel room overlooking the Spanish Steps in Rome. It is about a mysterious disappearance that haunts the life of the play's three characters. It was commissioned by and had its world premiere at the Salt Lake Acting Company in November 2004. The play received the American Theatre Critics Association's 2004 M. Elizabeth Osborn Award and the 2005 Pinter Review Prize for Drama, which included its first publication by the University of Tampa Press and a related public dramatic reading. It was also a finalist for the ATCA's Steinberg New Play Award and performed at the Summer Play Festival in New York City in July 2005. The play had its Australian premiere at the Melbourne Theatre Company in February 2010, directed by Sam Strong. The play had its European debut at London's Theatre 503 in May 2010, directed by Tom Littler and featuring Sorcha Cusack, Barry Stanton and Miranda Foster.

His play The Overwhelming, in which an American family who arrive in Kigali, Rwanda, in early 1994, must confront life-and-death realities of the Rwandan genocide, had its world premiere at the Cottesloe Theatre, Royal National Theatre, London, in association with Out of Joint, in May 2006.The production featured Andrew Garfield, Lucian Msamati, Danny Sapani, Tanya Moodie, and Mathew Marsh. After its premiere it toured throughout the UK and was performed on BBC radio. Its American premiere was at the Roundabout Theatre in September 2007. He received the Otis Guernsey New Voices Playwriting Award at the 2007 William Inge Theatre Festival in Independence, Kansas. The Overwhelming has since been done throughout the world, and it was selected as a Top 10 Play of the Year by Time Magazine, Time Out New York and the Chicago TribuneIt was also nominated for Best Play of the Year by London's South Bank Show and Boston's Elliot Norton Awards.

In 2009, Rogers was the sole American playwright along with 11 British authors to create The Great Game: Afghanistan for the Tricycle Theatre, London. The cycle of plays was a sensation, garnering an Olivier nomination for all involved. His White People, which had its world première at the Philadelphia Theatre Company and then received the L.A. Drama Critics Circle and John Barrymore Award nominations for "Best Play of the Year". The revised play was produced by Starry Night Entertainment Off-Broadway in 2009, and has been produced by the English Theatre of Berlin in 2014.

=== 2010–2018: Bloods and Gifts and Oslo ===
Rogers wrote the full-length play Blood and Gifts, which debuted at the Lyttelton Theatre, Royal National Theatre, London, in September 2010, starring Lloyd Owen with direction by Howard Davies. The play premiered in the US Off-Broadway in October 2011 at the Lincoln Center Newhouse Theater, directed by Bartlett Sher. Charles Isherwood, in his review in The New York Times, wrote that the play was "superb", with a "first rate production...the characters...really seem to be living in this turbulent history..." The reviewer for The Guardian, Michael Billington, criticised the writer's "advantage of hindsight which lends much of the action a self-conscious irony" but otherwise praised him for a "complex, demanding play." The play was nominated for the 2012 Lucille Lortel Award for Outstanding Play and Outstanding Lead Actor, Jefferson Mays and the 2012 Outer Critics Circle Award for Outstanding New Off-Broadway Play and Outstanding Featured Actor in a Play, Jefferson Mays.

Rogers' 2016 political drama Oslo became his most successful work to date, including a highly acclaimed Broadway run. Oslo premiered Off-Broadway at the Lincoln Center Newhouse Theatre to nearly universal acclaim. Oslo transferred to the Lincoln Center Beaumont Theatre, a Broadway house, where it opened on April 13, 2017. Of the larger Broadway production, Ben Brantley of the New York Times wrote that "J. T. Rogers's Oslo, an against-the-odds story of international peacemaking, is undeniably a big play, as expansive and ambitious as any in recent Broadway history. So it is particularly gratifying to announce that it has been allowed to stretch to its full height in the thrilling production that opened on Thursday night, directed with a master's hand by Bartlett Sher." Oslo's cast features Jennifer Ehle and Jefferson Mays, who also appeared in the Off-Broadway production.

The Broadway production was nominated for seven Tony Awards, winning for Best Play and Best Supporting Actor. It was the first play in NY Theater history to win all seven of the major playwriting awards. After Broadway, Oslo transferred to London for a September 2017 run at the Royal National Theatre, followed by a three-month run at the Harold Pinter Theatre in London's West End. [50] The London production starred Lydia Leonard and Toby Stephens was nominated for the 2017 Best Play by the Evening Standard Theater Awards and the 2018 Best New Play by the Laurence Olivier Awards. In 2018, Oslo opened in Tel Aviv, Israel, in South Korea by the National Theater Company of Korea, and later in Norway and Germany. The New National Theater in Japan ran the production in 2021. Rogers wrote the screenplay for a 2021 filmed version of his Tony Award-winning play Oslo. The film starred Ruth Wilson and Andrew Scott and was directed by Tony-winner Bartlett Sher, who helmed the Broadway play. Steven Spielberg and Marc Platt served as executive producers alongside Rogers, Sher, and Cambra Overend. It won the Critics Choice Award for best Television Film and was nominated for two Primetime Emmy Awards.

=== 2019–present ===
The New York Times commissioned Rogers to write One Giant Leap to celebrate the 50th anniversary of the Apollo 11 moon landing. The play premiered on July 21, 2019, fifty years to the day of the moon landing, at New York City's Town Hall and featured Samuel L. Jackson, Jeff Daniels, Lauren Ambrose, LaTanya Richardson Jackson, Dakin Matthewsand Arian Moayed among others. It was directed by Bartlett Sher and produced by Cambra Overend. Rogers created the play from the Apollo 11 mission transcripts, New York Times articles from the period, and his own interviews with those involved in the actual mission. It was also livestreamed internationally.

From 2019-2023, while living in Japan, Rogers created, wrote and was show runner for the acclaimed television drama Tokyo Vice, based on the non-fiction book by Jake Adelstein. The 18-episode two-season series was produced for HBO Max and stars Ansel Elgort, playing Adelstein, an American journalist hired to write in Japanese for the country’s biggest newspaper. Assigned to the crime beat, he becomes deeply immeshed in Tokyo’s underworld, where nothing and no one is what or who they seem. The first episode was directed by Michael Mann. The series also features Ken Watanabe, Rachel Keller, Show Kasamatzu and Ella Rumpf. Empire called it "“The kind of sprawling crime drama that actually lives up to the label of ‘prestige’ TV.” It was labelled the "Best Show You're Not Watching" by Variety. The two-season story completed, there were discussions between HBO and Rogers about a further, new two-season story but it was ultimately decided to wrap the series as is.

In 2024, Rogers reunited with director Bartlett Sher for his latest play Corruption about the 2011 News International phone hacking scandal based on the nonfiction book Dial M for Murdoch: News Corporation and the Corruption of Britain. The play debuted at the Mitzi E. Newhouse Theatre at Lincoln Center Theater and starred Toby Stephens, Dylan Baker and Saffron Burrows.

== Style and recognition ==
Rogers has indicated that his focus as a playwright is telling: "stories... framed against great political rupture... [about people] who struggle with, and against... [unfolding] world events — and who are [permanently changed] through that struggle." Rogers's plays are published by TCG Books and Nick Hern, and Dramatists Play Service in acting editions. His essays have appeared in The New York Times, The Guardian, New Statesman, and American Theatre.

Rogers’s plays have been staged on Broadway, numerous times both at Lincoln Center Theater and at London’s National Theatre, at the National Theaters of Norway, Japan, Israel, and South Korea, and across the US and the world. He is the recipient of the Irwin Piscator Award in recognition of his body of work, has been inducted into the New York Foundation for the Arts Hall of Fame, and holds an honorary doctorate from the University of North Carolina School of the Arts. His plays are published by Faber and Faber in the US and UK and in acting editions in the US through Dramatists Play Service and Playscripts. Rogers is a member of the Dramatists Guild and an alumus of New Dramatists. In 2012, he received a John Simon Guggenheim Memorial Foundation Fellowship for his work

== Personal life ==
Rogers lives in New York and Cape Cod.

== Works ==
=== Theatre ===
Year	Title	Venue	Ref.
1998	Murmuring in a Dead Tongue	Next Stage Company, New York	
1999	White People	Philadelphia Theatre Company	
2004	Madagascar	Salt Lake Acting Company, Utah	
2006	The Overwhelming	Cottlesloe Theatre, National Theatre, London	
2007	The Overwhelming	Roundabout Theatre Company, New York	
2010	Blood and Gifts	Lyttleton Theatre, National Theatre, London	
2011	Blood and Gifts	Mitzi E. Newhouse Theatre, Lincoln Center	
2012	Blood and Gifts	La Jolla Playhouse, California	
2016	Oslo	Mitzi E. Newhouse Theatre, Lincoln Center	
2017	Oslo	Vivian Beaumont Theatre, Broadway	
2017	Oslo	Lyttelton Theatre, National Theater, London	
2017	Oslo	Harold Pinter Theatre, West End	
2024	Corruption	Mitzi E. Newhouse Theatre, Lincoln Center	

=== Television ===
Year	Title	Writer	Producer	Notes	Ref.
2021	Oslo	Yes	Executive	HBO television film	
2022–2024	Tokyo Vice	Yes	Executive	Also creator; HBO Max series	

== Awards and nominations ==
Year	Award	Category	Work	Result	Ref.
2017	New York Drama Critics' Circle	Best Play	Oslo (play)	Won	
2017	Tony Award	Best Play	Oslo (play)	Won	
2017	Drama Desk Award	Outstanding Play	Oslo (play)	Won	
2017	Drama League Award	Outstanding Production of a Play	Oslo (play)	Won	
2017	Obie Award	Best New American Theatrical Work	Oslo (play)	Won	
2017	Lucille Lortel Award	Best Play	Oslo (play)	Won	
2017	Outer Critics Circle Award	Outstanding New Broadway Play	Oslo (play)	Won	
2018	Evening Standard Award Laurence Olivier Award	Best New Play Best New Play	Oslo (play)	Nominated	
2021	Primetime Emmy Award Critics Choice Award	Outstanding Television Movie Outstanding Movie for Television	Oslo (television film)	Nominated	

== See also ==
- Rwandan genocide
- Bibliography of the Rwandan Genocide
