= Goto-gumi =

Japanese yakuza organization

The Goto-gumi (後藤組, Gotō-gumi) was a Japanese yakuza organization founded by Tadamasa Goto.

== History ==
The gang was originally formed in Fujinomiya, Shizuoka Prefecture, but moved its activities east in 1991 when it merged with a gang in Hachiōji, Tokyo. The Goto-gumi, as an affiliate of Japan's largest yakuza organization, the Kobe-based Yamaguchi-gumi, was seen as a vanguard for Yamaguchi expansion into the Kantō region.

The gang achieved notoriety the following year when five of its members assaulted and seriously injured Japanese filmmaker Juzo Itami in retaliation for Itami's negative portrayal of the yakuza in his film Minbo no Onna. A former member confessed in 2008 that Itami's death in 1997, reported as a suicide at a time, was a murder carried out by Goto-gumi members who created a forged suicide note and then forced him to jump from the roof of his office building at gunpoint.

On October 14, 2008 Goto was expelled from the Yamaguchi-gumi and the Goto-gumi was split into two parts, headed by two chief executives of Goto's named Rachi and Tsukamoto. At the time of the expulsion, the supreme godfather Shinobu Tsukasa was in jail, and the expulsion was officially accepted by the number-two, Kiyoshi Takayama, the head of the second Kodo-kai. In April 2009 Tadamasa Goto publicly entered study for Buddhist priesthood.

In 2011 a Japanese man believed to be connected to the Goto-gumi was killed in Thailand.

== Activities ==
The Goto-gumi was active in various fields of business, such as the financial industry, real estate industry, construction industry, and in the political world. Also, the Goto-gumi had allegedly been very influential in the entertainment industry.

== Connections ==
The Goto-gumi had connections with the Buddhist organization Soka Gakkai.

The Goto-gumi had allegedly been connected to the Hong Kong mafia, and police reports indicated that the Goto-gumi had smuggled firearms from the Philippines, where they had connections with some of the country's high-ranking military officers. Members, especially senior members often visited foreign countries to acquire shooting skills.

== Goto's FBI scandal ==
In 2001 the FBI's representative in Tokyo arranged for Tadamasa Goto, then the head of the Goto-gumi, to receive a liver transplant in the United States in return for a $100,000 donation to the UCLA Medical Center in Los Angeles and information about Yamaguchi-gumi operations in the U.S. This was done without prior consultation of the Japanese National Police Agency. The journalist who uncovered the deal, Jake Adelstein, received threats from Goto and was given police protection in the US and in Japan.
