= Darren Jones =

British politician (born 1986)

The Right Honourable Darren Jones MP
- Official portrait, 2026

Chancellor of the Duchy of Lancaster
- In office 5 September 2025 – 20 July 2026
- Prime Minister: Keir Starmer
- Preceded by: Pat McFadden
- Succeeded by: Louise Haigh

Chief Secretary to the Prime Minister
- In office 1 September 2025 – 20 July 2026
- Prime Minister: Keir Starmer
- Preceded by: Office established
- Succeeded by: Office abolished

Minister for Intergovernmental Relations
- In office 6 September 2025 – 20 July 2026
- Prime Minister: Keir Starmer
- Preceded by: Pat McFadden
- Succeeded by: Hamish Falconer

Chief Secretary to the Treasury
- In office 5 July 2024 – 1 September 2025
- Prime Minister: Keir Starmer
- Preceded by: Laura Trott
- Succeeded by: James Murray

Chair of the Business and Trade Select Committee (Note: As Chair of the Business, Energy and Industrial Strategy Committee from 2020 to 2023.)
- In office 6 May 2020 – 4 September 2023
- Preceded by: Rachel Reeves
- Succeeded by: Liam Byrne

Shadow Chief Secretary to the Treasury
- In office 4 September 2023 – 5 July 2024
- Leader: Keir Starmer
- Preceded by: Pat McFadden
- Succeeded by: Laura Trott

Member of Parliament for Bristol North West
- Incumbent
- Assumed office 8 June 2017
- Preceded by: Charlotte Leslie
- Majority: 15,669 (32.3%)

Personal details
- Born: Darren Paul Jones; 13 November 1986 (age 39) Bristol, England
- Party: Labour
- Spouse: Lucy Symons-Jones (m. 2011)
- Children: 3
- Education: University of Plymouth (BSc); University of the West of England (GDL); University of Law (LPC)
- Website: Official website
- Darren Jones's voice Jones on how artificial intelligence can promote economic growth Recorded 7 July 2023

Darren Paul Jones (born 13 November 1986) is a British politician who served as Chancellor of the Duchy of Lancaster, Chief Secretary to the Prime Minister and Minister for Intergovernmental Relations from September 2025 to July 2026. A member of the Labour Party, he has been the Member of Parliament (MP) for Bristol North West since 2017.

Jones previously chaired the House of Commons Business and Trade Select Committee from 2020 to 2023 and served as Shadow Chief Secretary to the Treasury from September 2023 to July 2024. Following the 2024 general election, he served as Chief Secretary to the Treasury from July 2024 to September 2025.

== Early life and education ==
Darren Jones was born on 13 November 1986 in Bristol, and grew up in Lawrence Weston. He attended Portway Community School in Shirehampton, a state comprehensive, and has spoken about his experiences of growing up in poverty.

Jones studied human bioscience at the University of Plymouth, where he was elected President of the Students' Union. He worked in the National Health Service and served on the boards of the University of Plymouth and the Plymouth NHS Trust, and had a weekly newspaper column in the Plymouth Herald. He later read law at the University of the West of England and The University of Law in Bristol before being admitted as a solicitor.

== Career ==
=== Legal career ===
Jones initially worked at Womble Bond Dickinson LLP, before becoming an in-house counsel with BT, advising on data privacy, cyber-security, telecommunications and consumer law. In Bristol, he started a mentoring programme seeking to bring young people from his old school into the legal profession. Following the Brexit referendum in 2016, he sat on the board of UK Legal Futures, which brought together leading lawyers to advise politicians and civil servants on legal questions raised by Brexit.

=== Political career ===
Jones stood as the Labour candidate in Torridge and West Devon at the 2010 general election, coming fourth with 5.3% of the vote behind the incumbent Conservative MP Geoffrey Cox, the Liberal Democrat candidate, and the UKIP candidate. Jones later sat on the national youth committees of the Co-operative Party and Unite the Union and was elected to Unite's Regional Political Committee in the South West.

At the 2015 general election, Jones stood in Bristol North West, coming second with 34.4% of the vote behind the incumbent Conservative MP Charlotte Leslie. Following the 2015 election, Jones joined the campaign of Labour leadership hopeful Andy Burnham as its South West Co-ordinator, and chaired Marvin Rees's successful campaign to become Mayor of Bristol.

In 2016 he joined the Remain campaign in the EU membership referendum and chaired the Young Lawyers' Network, a nationwide group campaigning for a vote to remain in the European Union in the 2016 referendum. He supported Owen Smith in the 2016 Labour Party leadership election, saying he had been a "Labour Party member with disinterest" prior to the election. Later in 2016, he went to the United States to work for the Clinton campaign in Miami during that year's US Presidential election.

Jones was also the chair of Labour Digital, a Labour think tank.

== Parliamentary career ==
=== First term (2017–2019) ===
At the 2017 general election, Jones was elected the Member of Parliament for Bristol North West, overturning a Conservative majority of 4,944 on a 9.2 percent swing. In his maiden speech, Jones noted that he was the first Darren ever elected to Parliament.

Between 2017 and 2020, Jones was a member of the cross-party Science and Technology Committee and the European Scrutiny Committee.

In 2019, then Deputy Leader of the Labour Party Tom Watson appointed Jones as the Convenor of the Future Britain Group, which was established following a number of defections from the Labour Party in a bid to prevent further defections.

=== Second term (2019–2024) ===
Jones was re-elected at the 2019 general election, with an increased majority of 5,692 but a decreased vote share of 48.9%.

Following Keir Starmer's election as Labour leader in April 2020, Jones was appointed Parliamentary private secretary jointly to Shadow Justice Secretary David Lammy and Shadow Attorney General Charlie Falconer, and served until his election as Chair of the House of Commons Business, Energy and Industrial Strategy Committee.

Jones built a national profile as Chair of the House of Commons Business, Energy and Industrial Strategy Committee, winning a number of awards and attracting millions of views of his committee hearings on social media.

He led on a number of issues including the withholding of redundancy payments from AstraZeneca workers, the campaign to increase miners' pensions through the Mineworkers Pension Scheme, and the British Post Office scandal, the right for workers to join a trade union at Amazon and the dispute related to changes at Royal Mail. In 2020, he introduced the UK's first citizens' assembly on net zero to Parliament. He has also led Parliamentary inquiries into the decarbonisation of heating, electricity and industry, as well as reform of the energy market in the United Kingdom.

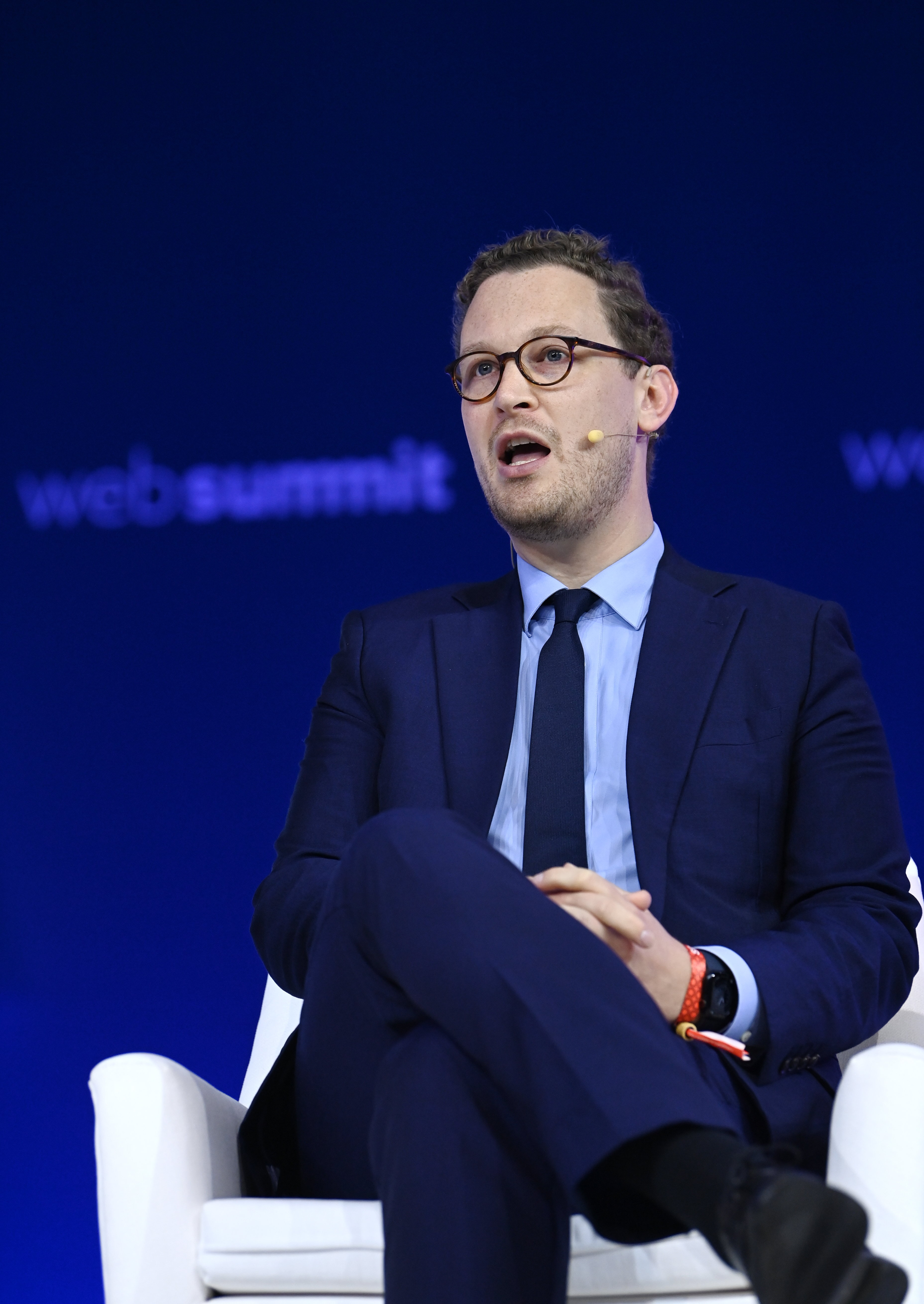
Jones at Web Summit 2022

Jones also sat on the National Security Strategy Joint Committee and, following the introduction of the National Security and Investment Act 2021, became responsible as Chair of the Business, Energy and Industrial Strategy Committee for holding the Government to account for its use of national security powers. He has also served on the Liaison Committee, the committee that scrutinises the Prime Minister. As a member of that committee, Jones had frequent notable exchanges with then-Prime Minister Boris Johnson, including during the final days prior to Johnson announcing his resignation in July 2022 when Jones informed him that his cabinet was waiting for him in 10 Downing Street to tell him to resign.

Jones was the founder and chair of the Interparliamentary Forum on Emerging Technologies, a global network of legislators interested in emerging technology regulation, and in 2021 was appointed to the Online Safety Bill pre-legislative scrutiny committee. In 2021, he passed the Forensic Science Regulator Act 2021, having been successful in the ballot for a Private Members Bill, giving the forensic science regulator statutory powers to ensure service quality standards from the privatised forensic science companies working with the police.

In 2022, Jones was appointed as a member of the EU–UK Parliamentary Partnership Assembly.

In the 2023 British shadow cabinet reshuffle, he joined the shadow cabinet as Shadow Chief Secretary to the Treasury. He has been described as one of the Labour Party's strongest communicators and became one of the most recognisable faces of the shadow cabinet during the 2024 general election campaign.

=== Third term (2024–) ===
At the 2024 general election, Jones was again re-elected, with an increased vote share of 49.6% and an increased majority of 15,669; representing the largest majority ever recorded in Bristol North West.

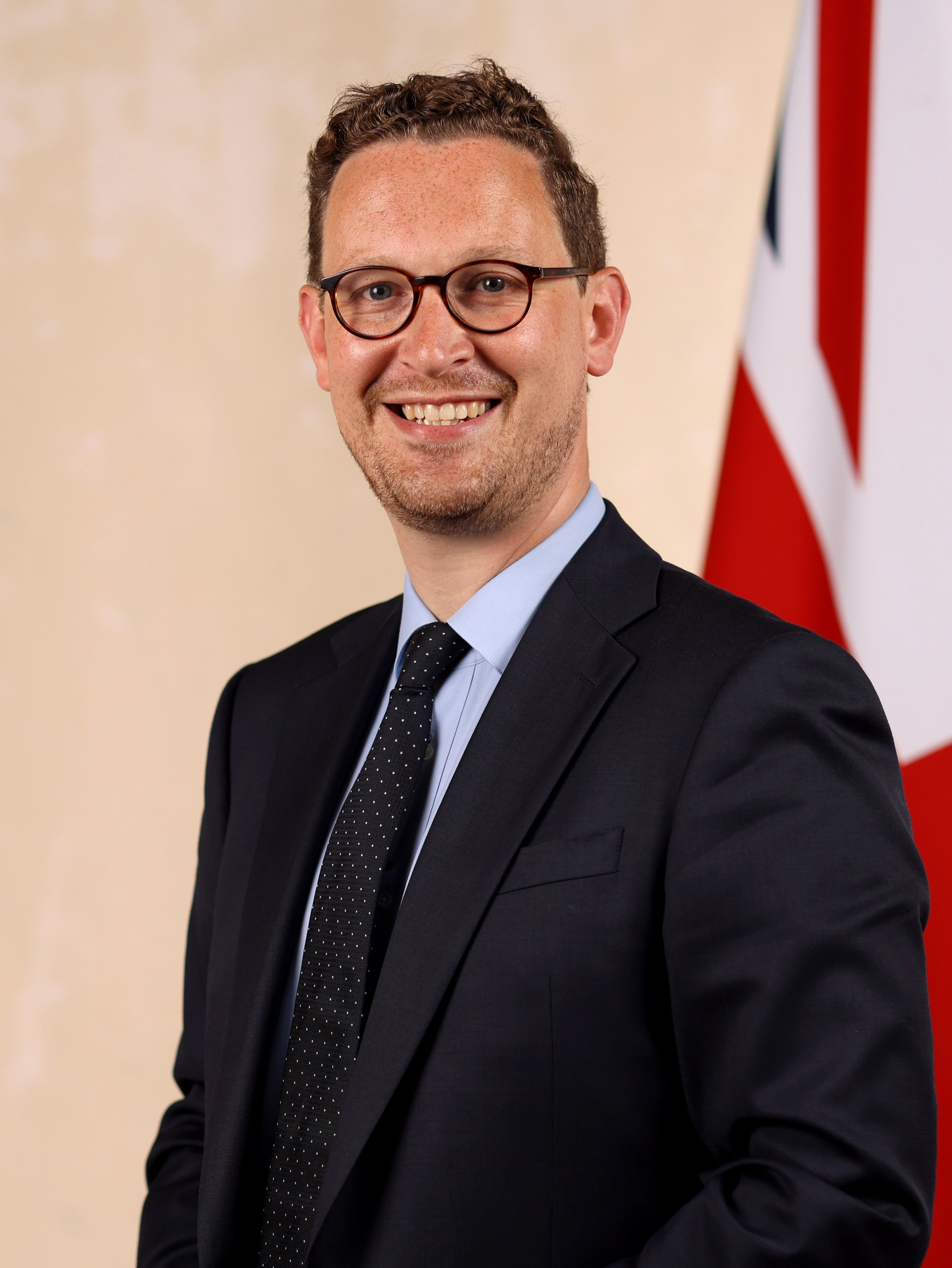
Official portrait 2024

Jones was appointed Chief Secretary to the Treasury and attended Cabinet. As deputy to the Chancellor, he was responsible for public spending, delivering the government's ten year national infrastructure strategy and leading for HM Treasury on the digital transformation of public services. He was also responsible for the creation and leadership of the National Infrastructure and Service Transformation Authority (NISTA).

Jones apologised for comments he made after the March 2025 United Kingdom spring statement, where he used the example of pocket money when talking about cuts to Personal Independence Payments for disabled people. The Chancellor of the Exchequer Rachel Reeves had said it was "not the right analogy" when asked about the comment in an interview.

On the BBC's Question Time on 12 June 2025, Jones said of English Channel migrant crossings "And when you see that the majority of the people in these boats are children, babies and women… you have got to take note". Jones rejected fellow panellist Zia Yusuf's statement that 90% of cross-Channel migrants were men. Jones later acknowledged that his statement was incorrect, saying that the overall majority of people arriving in small boats were men. Conservative leader Kemi Badenoch called for Jones to retract his statement and apologise. The following day, Jones said that the majority of migrants were men, and that his statement about women and children being the majority referred to one visit he had made to Border Security Command.

In a cabinet reshuffle on 1 September 2025, Jones was appointed as Chief Secretary to the Prime Minister and was succeeded by James Murray as Chief Secretary to the Treasury. He was also appointed as Chancellor of the Duchy of Lancaster and Minister for Intergovernmental Relations on 5 September, after Pat McFadden succeeded Liz Kendall as Secretary of State for Work and Pensions.

A member of the Cabinet and the National Security Council, Jones deputised for the Prime Minister Keir Starmer on a wide range of domestic policy issues, including on economic policy and public service delivery.

In June 2026, it became public that Jones had messaged Peter Mandelson after his resignation as U.S. Ambassador due to his continuing friendship with Jeffrey Epstein after criminal convictions that he was "so sorry" when he was sacked, despite previously having denied in a BBC interview sending Mandelson a "warm message".

During the 2026 Labour Party leadership crisis, Jones was named as a possible candidate for the Labour Party leadership after Starmer stood down, however on 24 June 2026 Jones said he was confident the leading candidate Andy Burnham understood the fiscal rules and that he would not stand as an opponent.

Incoming PM Burnham sacked Darren Jones during the cabinet reshuffle. Jones says he will continue representing Bristol North West. He criticised the new plans on digital ID.

== Political positions ==
Politico Europe has described Jones as being on the Labour right, and he has described Tony Blair as one of his political heroes.

He has been noted as a prominent voice in debates on technology policy in Parliament, and has described himself as a techno-optimist. He supported Remain in the 2016 United Kingdom European Union membership referendum. He has supported electoral reform to a proportional system. He has opposed ending UK arms sales to Israel during the Gaza war, saying that it would not end the war, though understood why people would call for it "in the circumstances". In 2025, Jones said the era of globalisation "ended" following Donald Trump's tariffs.

Jones told his constituents in November 2024 that he would not support the assisted dying legislation being brought to Parliament by his Labour colleague Kim Leadbeater.

== Personal life ==
Jones is married to Australian net zero consultant and technology entrepreneur Lucy Symons-Jones, who co-founded the renewable energy company Village Infrastructure in 2011. Due to its early financial challenges, Symons-Jones left the business in 2014. They have three daughters. Jones became a vegan in 2014, for reasons related to carbon emissions and agriculture, although he is sometimes vegetarian.

Jones was sworn of the Privy Council on 10 July 2024.

== Notes ==
Parliament of the United Kingdom
Preceded by Charlotte Leslie	Member of Parliament for Bristol North West; 2017–present	Incumbent
Political offices
Preceded by Pat McFadden	Shadow Chief Secretary to the Treasury; 2023–2024	Succeeded by Laura Trott
Preceded by Laura Trott	Chief Secretary to the Treasury; 2024–2025	Succeeded by James Murray
New office	Chief Secretary to the Prime Minister; 2025–2026	Office abolished
Preceded by Pat McFadden	Chancellor of the Duchy of Lancaster; 2025–2026	Succeeded by Louise Haigh
