= Tadamasa Goto =

Japanese mob boss (1942–2026)

- 後藤 忠政
- Born: September 16, 1942; Ebara, Tokyo, Japan
- Died: February 8, 2026 (aged 83); Tokyo, Japan
- Occupation: Yakuza

Tadamasa Goto (後藤 忠政, Gotō Tadamasa; September 16, 1942 – February 8, 2026) was a Japanese yakuza. He was the founding head of the Goto-gumi, a Fujinomiya-based affiliate of Japan's largest yakuza syndicate, the Yamaguchi-gumi. Goto, who had been convicted at least nine times, was a prominent yakuza and at one point the most powerful crime boss in Tokyo, even being dubbed the "John Gotti of Japan". Goto was once claimed to have been the largest shareholder in Japan Airlines, but this was disputed by stock exchange filings.

Goto was barred from entering the United States until 2001, when he got a special visa deal from the FBI for a life-saving liver transplant at a time of pronounced organ scarcity.

He allegedly retired from criminal activity in 2008. Nonetheless, the US Treasury department put him on a watchlist in December 2015 and he was still engaged in criminal activities.

== Career overview ==
According to his autobiography, Goto was born in Ebara, Tokyo on September 16, 1942, as the youngest of four brothers. After the beginning of the Pacific War, of World War II, he moved to his father's hometown Fujinomiya, Shizuoka at age two when his mother died. He was raised by his grandmother and grew up in poverty.

After a period as a street thug in Fujinomiya, his yakuza career officially began in 1972, at age 28, when he joined a tertiary Yamaguchi-affiliate based in Fujinomiya. Goto was rapidly promoted, and in 1985 he formed his own yakuza group, the Goto-gumi, in Fujinomiya as a secondary affiliate of the Yamaguchi-gumi. He entered the Kobe headquarters of the Yamaguchi-gumi in its 4th era (1984–1985), and had been in the headquarters until 2008 when he was expelled.

== FBI scandal ==
In 2001, after dealing with the FBI, Goto entered the United States to receive a liver transplant, and gave a $100,000 donation to the UCLA Medical Center in Los Angeles. He got his new liver, from a queue-jumping transplant, in a year when 186 people in the Los Angeles region died waiting for a liver.

The Los Angeles hospital provided altogether four Japanese gang figures with liver transplants over a period when several hundred local patients died while awaiting transplants. According to Goto's Tokyo-based lawyer, Yoshiyuki Maki, Goto continued to receive medical care from his world-renowned liver surgeon Dr. Ronald Busuttil in Japan. Busuttil flew to Japan and examined Goto on more than one occasion, even whilst Goto was in custody in 2006.

Although the FBI would want some crucial information about the Yamaguchi-gumi's activities in the United States, Goto provided little useful information, according to a retired chief of the FBI's Asian criminal enterprise unit in Washington. His information included a clue about some activities of Susumu Kajiyama, the "Emperor of Loan Sharks".

== Retirement and death ==
Goto began disappearing from the yakuza scene in 2008 after allegedly being forced into retirement by the Kobe headquarters' ruling faction led by Kiyoshi Takayama of the Kodo-kai. His expulsion from the Yamaguchi-gumi was officially confirmed by the headquarters in October 2008. After retirement, he became a Buddhist priest, with his Buddhist name "Chuei" (忠叡).

Goto died on February 8, 2026, at the age of 83.

== Literature and television ==
=== Autobiography ===
Goto released his autobiography, Habakarinagara (lit. "while hesitating", roughly analogous to the western phrase "with all due respect"), in May 2010. Habakarinagara had sold over 225,000 copies and went to number one in sales on various book-sales charts in Japan, by early 2011. All book royalties were donated to charity, Cambodia's "Angkor Association for the Disabled" and Myanmar's two Buddhist temples including "Mogok Vipassana Temple". Angkor Association for the Disabled's official website has listed Goto as a major donor, with his Buddhist name "The Venerable Chyuei [Gotou]".

=== Tokyo Vice ===
Goto was a major antagonist in reporter Jake Adelstein's 2009 memoir Tokyo Vice, which extensively details Goto's liver transplant and alleged criminal activity. In it, Adelstein claims that his police and yakuza contacts warned him that Goto intended to kill him for exposing his activities. In the HBO television series of the same name, Goto was the basis for the character Shinzo Tozawa (played by Ayumi Tanida).

== U.S. Treasury sanctions ==
In December 2015, Goto was named by the U.S. Department of the Treasury's Office of Foreign Assets Control as an individual with ongoing associations with the Japanese yakuza. Sanctions were imposed to effectively freeze all known assets held by Goto in the United States and to prohibit all U.S. persons from engaging in transactions with him.

== See also ==
- Tokyo Vice a 2009 memoir by Jake Adelstein
