= Forensic Science Regulator =

UK regulator of forensic science activities

- Abbreviation: FSR
- Formation: 2008; 18 years ago
- Type: Non-departmental public body

The Forensic Science Regulator is the regulator of forensic science activities within England and Wales' legal system. The regulator is advised by the Forensic Science Advisory Council. The post dates from 2008.

The office of Forensic Science Regulator was originally created without any statutory powers.

The first Forensic Science Regulator was Andrew Rennison. Dr Gillian Tully was appointed to hold the post for three years from November 2014. In November 2017 Dr Tully was re-appointed for a further three years until November 2020. In her 2018 annual report, Tully urged the UK Government to put the role of the Forensic Science Regulator on a statutory footing.

Forensic Science Regulator Act 2021
- Act of Parliament
- Parliament of the United Kingdom
- Long title: An Act to make provision for the appointment of the Forensic Science Regulator; to make provision about the Regulator and about the regulation of forensic science; and for connected purposes.
- Citation: 2021 c. 14
- Introduced by: Darren Jones (Commons); Lord Kennedy of Southwark (Lords)

Dates
- Royal assent: 29 April 2021

Status: Current legislation

The Forensic Science Regulator Act 2021 made the role of the Forensic Science Regulator a statutory body and requires the Regulator to prepare and publish a code of practice and allows the regulator to shut down labs that do not meet quality standards. The Act also introduces new statutory powers for the Regulator to investigate and issues compliance notices where they have concerns about how a forensic science activity is being conducted. The statutory code of practice was published in 2023.

The regulator and its regulations has been criticised for being overly burdensome and for too much time being spent on compliance.

== See also ==
- Forensic Science Service
