= Cop in the Hood =

Cop in the Hood: My Year Policing Baltimore's Eastern District
- Author: Peter Moskos
- Language: English
- Genre: Crime
- Publisher: Princeton University Press
- Publication date: April 2008
- Publication place: United States
- Pages: 245
- ISBN: 978-0-691-14008-7
- OCLC: 181079174
- Dewey Decimal: 363.2092 B 22
- LC Class: HV7911.M644 A3 2008

Cop in the Hood: My Year Policing Baltimore's Eastern District is a book written in 2008 by a former Baltimore police officer, Peter Moskos. In this book Peter describes his one-year working in Baltimore's Eastern District. Moskos, a Harvard graduate student raised in a white middle class liberal household, describes his first hand experiences with poverty and violent crime in Baltimore's roughest police district, which encompassed a virtually all African American ghetto of East Baltimore.

In the book, Moskos argues in favor of reforming the criminal justice system and the legalization of drugs. After Moskos graduated from Harvard, he became a professor at the John Jay College of Criminal Justice, where he currently teaches.

== See also ==
Books:

- Homicide: A Year on the Killing Streets
- Tokyo Vice

General:

- Crime in Baltimore
