= Baltimore Crew =

Italian American organized crime group

- Founding location: Little Italy, Baltimore, Maryland, US
- Years active: 1920s - 1990
- Territory: Baltimore metropolitan area
- Ethnicity: Italians and Italian-Americans as "made man", other ethnicities as associates
- Membership (est.): Around 10 made members, Around 50 associates
- Criminal activities: Gambling, extortion, prostitution, loan sharking, fraud, drug trafficking, murder and corruption
- Allies: Gambino crime family; Philadelphia Crime Family; Philadelphia Greek Mob

The Baltimore Crew was an Italian-American organized-crime group that ultimately became a faction of the Gambino crime family operating in the port city of Baltimore, Maryland, from about 1900 until the 1990s. It was originally an independent organization, led by the D'Urso family until the Corbi takeover in the 1920s. In 1955, Vincent Mangano of the New York–based Gambino family moved in and installed Louis Morici as the reigning caporegime over the area. The Corbi family acquiesced to the Gambino relationship, but maintained local leaders, simply answering to and accessing support from Morici and his New York Gambino connections. Throughout most of its existence, after 1920, "The Baltimore Cosca" was functionally headed by members of the Corbi family: Vito, and then his sons, Pasquale "Patsy" and Frank.

== History ==
=== Rule of the Corbi brothers ===
In the spring of 1923, Patsy Corbi was sentenced to life imprisonment for the murder of local barber Frank Naples, a reputed Camorra member. Antonio "Tony" Corbi went into hiding in 1923, and reportedly traveled to Mexico and Italy, attempting to evade charges for the murder of Belle Lemons. He did not resurface publicly until the 1930s in Youngstown Ohio where he ran the Yo Hio Social Club.

=== Under Gambino leadership ===
In 1966, Lou Morici stepped down from the role of capo due to ill health. During this time, the crew was put under the management of the then-capo Joseph N. Gallo. Frank Corbi assumed the position of acting leader of the Baltimore operation, reporting directly to Gallo. Eventually, Corbi was promoted to official captain of the outfit.

By the 1980s most of the known membership had died or retired.

== Historical Leadership ==
- Luigi Morici
- Frank Corbi

== Historical Membership ==
- Vincent Coronna
- Frank Dabenne
- Thomas "Reds" Aversa
- Benjamin "Benny Trotta" Magliano

== Historical Associates ==
- Joseph Nunzio Corbi (1911–2001)
- Joseph Tamburello (1906–1983)
- August "Nick Trotta" Magliano (1917–1998)
- Angelo Munafo (1927–2001)
- Mario Orazio Anello (1905–1972)
- Joseph Gigliotti (1903–2001)
- Frank Malvaso (1904?-1991?)
- Angelo Perrera (1912–1972)

== See also ==
- Crime in Baltimore
- History of the Italians in Baltimore
