= Crime in Baltimore =

Baltimore
- Crime rates* (2025)

Violent crimes
- Homicide: 22.9
- Rape: 45.9^{**}
- Aggravated assault: 836.1
- Total violent crime: 1433.6

Property crimes
- Burglary: 572
- Arson: 16.4
- Total property crime: 3059.4
- Note: Reported crimes per 100,000 population Source: Baltimore City

The American city of Baltimore, Maryland, has struggled with crime rates above national averages. Violent crime spiked after the death of Freddie Gray on April 19, 2015, which sparked riots and an increase in murders. The city recorded 348 killings in 2019, a number second only to the number recorded in 1993 when the population was nearly 125,000 higher. In recent years the city has seen a sharp decrease in homicides, recording 201 in 2024, the lowest number since 2011.

== Crime statistics ==
Historically, Baltimore's level of violent crime has been much higher than the national average. Homicides initially peaked in early 1970s when the city, like many others in the nation, saw an influx in cheap heroin from Mexico and elsewhere. These numbers declined slowly in the next seven years before increasing again with the advent of crack cocaine. In 2009, a total of 1,318,398 violent crimes were reported nationwide across the United States, equivalent to a rate of 0.4 incidents per 100 people. In 2011, the Baltimore Police Department reported 196 killings, marking the first time the city had fewer than 200 killings since 1978. That number is far lower than the peak homicide count of 353 in 1993. The drop in 2011 was significant, when measured by the number of homicides, but the homicide rate was in the same range as the late 1980s, when Baltimore's population was 130,000 higher. City leaders credited their sustained focus on repeat violent offenders and an increased community engagement for the continued drop, reflecting a nationwide decline in crime.

Baltimore's decline in the murder rate was short-lived, with 219 and 235 homicides in 2012 and 2013, respectively. Baltimore's jump in homicides in 2013 defied regional and national trends.

Following the death of Freddie Gray on April 19, 2015, the city experienced civil unrest for 17 days with widespread violence, arson, and looting. On July 10, 2015, Mayor Stephanie Rawlings-Blake fired Police Commissioner Anthony Batts, saying his presence had become a distraction in a city that needs to focus on ending a dramatic spike in homicides. The city took steps to quell the increased violence by seeking assistance from the Federal Bureau of Investigation and other federal agencies, including embedding FBI agents in the city's police homicide unit. Baltimore had seen 211 murders as of August 19, 2015, which equaled the total number of murders that occurred in Baltimore in all of 2014. On November 13, 2015, the number of murders for the year reached, and the next day surpassed, 300 for the first time since 1999. In total Baltimore recorded 344 homicides in 2015, at that time a number second only to the 353 homicides recorded in 1993 when the population was 100,000 higher. At the time this was the highest murder rate on a per capita basis ever recorded. In the years that followed Baltimore continued to see an increase in murders and violent crime.

In an interview in The Guardian, on November 2, 2017, David Simon, himself a former The Baltimore Sun police reporter, ascribed the most recent surge in murders to the high-profile decision by Baltimore state's attorney, Marilyn Mosby, to charge six city police officers following the death of Freddie Gray, after he fell into a coma while in police custody in April 2015. "What Mosby basically did was send a message to the Baltimore police department: 'I'm going to put you in jail for making a bad arrest.' So officers figured it out: 'I can go to jail for making the wrong arrest, so I'm not getting out of my car to clear a corner,' and that's exactly what happened post-Freddie Gray." In Baltimore, arrest numbers have plummeted from more than 40,000 in 2014, the year before Freddie Gray's death and the subsequent charges against the officers, to about 18,000 as of November 1, 2017. This happened even as homicides soared from 211 in 2014, to 344 in 2015 – an increase of 63%. Since 2021 homicide numbers have down trended, reaching a 13-year low of 201 in 2024. Between 2021 and November 2025 there was a 61% reduction in homicides. In 2025 Baltimore recorded 133 homicides, its lowest in nearly 50 years.

Homicides in Baltimore 1950s – present
Year	Total homicides	Homicides, rate per 100,000	U.S. homicides, rate per 100,000	Ref.
1950			4.6	
1951	78	8.2	4.4	
1952	85	9	4.6	
1953	63	6.6	4.5	
1954	82	8.6	4.2	
1955	76	8	4.1	
1956	67	7.1	4.1	
1957	84	8.9	4.0	
1958	100	10.6	4.8	
1959	84	8.9	4.9	
1960	107	11.4	5.1	
1961	89	9.5	4.8	
1962	105	11.2	4.6	
1963	142	15.1	4.6	
1964	144	15.3	4.9	
1965	131	14	5.1	
1966	175	19.3	5.6	
1967	200	22.1	6.2	
1968	239	26.4	6.9	
1969	237	26.2	7.3	
1970	231	25.5	7.9	
1971	323	35.7	8.6	
1972	330	36.4	9.0	
1973	280	30.9	9.4	
1974	293	32.3	9.8	
1975	259	28.6	9.6	
1976	200	25.4	8.8	
1977	171	20.7	8.8	
1978	199	25.5	9.0	
1979	245	31.0	9.7	
1980	216	27.5	10.2	
1981	228	28.6	9.8	
1982	227	28.4	9.1	
1983	201	25.0	8.3	
1984	215	27.3	7.9	
1985	213	27.6	7.9	
1986	240	30.6	8.6	
1987	226	29.5	8.3	
1988	234	31.0	8.4	
1989	262	35.1	8.7	
1990	305	41.4	9.4	
1991	304	40.6	9.8	
1992	335	44.3	9.3	
1993	353	48.2	9.5	
1994	321	43.4	9.0	
1995	325	45.6	8.2	
1996	328	45.8	7.4	
1997	312	43.4	6.8	
1998	312	47.1	6.3	
1999	305	46.9	5.7	
2000	261	40.3	5.6	
2001	256	38.7	5.6	
2002	253	37.7	5.6	
2003	270	41.9	5.7	
2004	276	43.5	5.5	
2005	269	42	5.7	
2006	276	43.3	5.8	
2007	282	45.2	5.7	
2008	234	36.9	5.4	
2009	238	37.3	5.0	
2010	223	34.8	4.8	
2011	196	31.3	4.7	
2012	218	34.9	4.7	
2013	233	37.4	4.5	
2014	211	33.8	4.9	
2015	344	55.4	5.1	
2016	318	51.4	5.3	
2017	343	55.9	5.7	
2018	309	51	5.7	
2019	348	58.3	6.0	
2020	335	57.1	7.8	
2021	337	58.3	6.9	
2022	333	58.4	6.3	
2023	261	46.0	5.5	
2024	201	34.3	5.0	
2025	133	22.7	4.0	

Additional Sources:

Key
Record low
Record high

== Location ==
Homicides in Baltimore are heavily concentrated within a small number of high-poverty neighborhoods. According to a 2016 Baltimore Sun investigation, around 80% of the city's gun homicides are committed in 25% of the city's neighborhoods. Following the political unrest in the aftermath of Freddy Gray's death, the rate of lethal shootings has been increased in Baltimore and at least 10 other cities, such as Washington, D.C., Chicago, and Milwaukee. In 2016, the Coldstream Homestead Montebello neighborhood in Northeast Baltimore was Baltimore's most lethal neighborhood, with an average of one out of every two shootings being fatal. The citywide average is one in three.

Gang-related crimes are usually clustered in drug territories and mostly affect people involved in drug dealing, particularly narcotics and rival gangs.

Sandtown-Winchester, Baltimore, is one of West Baltimore's most blighted and problematic communities. In the second half of the 20th century, Sandtown experienced economic depression, housing abandonment, crime, and the effects of the Baltimore riot of 1968. Sandtown-Winchester was the home of Freddie Gray and the scene of his arrest. Following his death, the area was hard hit by riots, including the looting and burning of a CVS drug store off the north-east corner of Sandtown-Winchester at the intersection of Pennsylvania and W. North Avenue.

The area was once considered middle-class. Its residents are largely lower-income African Americans. The neighborhood served as a filming location for the Baltimore-based HBO television drama, The Wire.

== Policing ==
The Baltimore Police Department is staffed by nearly 4,000 civilian and sworn personnel. These include dispatchers, crime lab technicians, chaplains and unarmed auxiliary police officers. During Martin O'Malley's administration as mayor, the department had become 43% African American.

In 2003, the FBI identified irregularities in the number of rapes reported, which was confirmed by then-Mayor Martin O'Malley. The number of homicides in 2005 appeared to exhibit discrepancies as well. Former police commissioner Kevin P. Clark said in an interview that the administration suppressed corrections to its crime reports; however, many of the charges made by the police commissioner now appear to have been politically motivated. The veracity of crime statistics reported by the Baltimore Police Department once again came under scrutiny in 2006, this time from Maryland legislators.

== Works ==
- The Corner: A Year in the Life of an Inner-City Neighborhood
- Cop in the Hood: My Year Policing Baltimore's Eastern District
- Homicide: A Year on the Killing Streets, 1991 book by David Simon
- Homicide: Life on the Street, 1990s police drama TV series based on Simon's book.
- The Wire, 2002–2008 HBO crime drama television series created by David Simon and set in Baltimore.
- Serial (podcast), 2014–present podcast based on murders in Baltimore.

== See also ==
- 2012 St. Patrick's Day beating
- Baltimore City Detention Center
- Baltimore Crew
- Baltimore riot of 1861
- Baltimore riot of 1968
- Baltimore riot of 2015
- The Block, Baltimore
