= Future Britain Group =

2019 grouping within the UK Labour Party

- Founder: Tom Watson
- Convener: Darren Jones
- Founded: 8 March 2019; 7 years ago
- Dissolved: September 2021
- Ideology: Third Way; Social democracy Pro-Europeanism
- Political position: Centre to centre-left
- National affiliation: Labour Party
- Colours: Red

The Future Britain Group was a group of over 150 Labour parliamentarians (around 70 peers and 80 MPs) set up in March 2019 by then-Deputy Leader of the Labour Party, Tom Watson, comprising those on the centre, centre-left and soft left of the party. The first meeting of the grouping is believed to have been attended by almost a third of Labour MPs. Its convener was MP Darren Jones.

== History and ideology ==
The group was set up following defections from the Labour and Conservative parties to form the centrist, pro-European parliamentary grouping the Independent Group (TIG). Watson set up Future Britain to prevent further defections from the party.

Notable individuals in the group included former Labour leader Lord Neil Kinnock and John Prescott as well as leading Blairites and Brownites, including Lord Peter Mandelson, Lord Andrew Adonis, MP Yvette Cooper, Lord David Blunkett, MP Pat McFadden, Lord Stewart Wood, Hilary Benn and Lord Peter Hain.

Since the resignation of a few Labour MPs to form TIG, and 18 February 2019 registration, Future Britain's parked-website (www.futurebritaingroup.co.uk/) just said 'Coming Soon'. It was registered 19 days before Watson publicly named the group. Additionally, in what was seen as an attack on Jeremy Corbyn and the left wing of the party, Watson argued that Labour's front bench should be reshuffled to accommodate "social democratic and democratic socialist traditions" of the Labour Party.

The group sought a broad church/big tent approach to the party. Mandelson described the group as a "coming together of the TB-GBs", a reference to the long standing divisions between those loyal to former Labour leaders Tony Blair and Gordon Brown in the New Labour era. Kinnock said the group was set up to promote "democratic socialist values" and "achievable, possible and affordable policies". Over 150 Labour MPs and Lords attended the group's launch, including 14 members of the Shadow Cabinet and 13 former cabinet members.

Although Jones as convener denied allegations of factionalism, or that it was "a Labour equivalent of the Tory European Research Group" or "New Labour 2.0", the group had been called a "new faction" of deputy leader Tom Watson. The Times noted that there were "fears in the Labour high command that Mr Watson is in effect establishing a party within a party". However, Jones denied these claims.

The group was short-lived and had been dissolved by September 2021.

== Sources ==
- Mason, Chris (11 March 2019). "Future Britain Group draws Labour MPs". BBC News.
- Steerpike (11 March 2019). "The mystery of Tom Watson and the 'Future Britain Group' website". Coffee House. The Spectator.
- Watts, Joe (11 March 2019). "More than 150 Labour figures join new group following resignations over Corbyn's leadership". The Independent.
- The Week (12 March 2019). "What is the Future Britain Group and will it make any difference?". The Week UK.
- Zeffman, Henry (12 March 2019). "Tom Watson's rebel group draws a third of Labour MPs". The Times.
- Schofield, Kevin (25 March 2019). "Darren Jones: On Labour's new social democratic force". PoliticsHome.
- Webb, Paul; Bale, Tim (September 2021). "Conflict and cohesion within parties". The Modern British Party System: 205–236 – via Oxford Academic.
