= Tokyo Vice (TV series) =

2022 American crime drama television series

- Genre: Crime drama
- Created by: J. T. Rogers
- Based on: Tokyo Vice: An American Reporter on the Police Beat in Japan by Jake Adelstein
- Starring: Ansel Elgort; Ken Watanabe; Rachel Keller; Hideaki Itō; Show Kasamatsu; Ella Rumpf; Rinko Kikuchi; Tomohisa Yamashita; Miki Maya; Yōsuke Kubozuka
- Composers: Danny Bensi; Saunder Jurriaans
- Country of origin: United States
- Original languages: English; Japanese
- No. of seasons: 2
- No. of episodes: 18

Production
- Executive producers: John Lesher; Michael Mann; J. T. Rogers; Alan Poul; Ansel Elgort; Emily Gerson Saines; Jake Adelstein; Kayo Washio; Brad Caleb Kane; Destin Daniel Cretton; Ken Watanabe
- Producers: Ralph Winter; Satch Watanabe
- Production locations: Tokyo, Japan
- Cinematography: John Grillo; Diego García; Katsumi Yanagijima; Daniel Satinoff
- Running time: 54–63 minutes
- Production companies: Gerson Saines Productions; Grisbi; SRO Productions; Boku Films; Forward Pass; Wowow; Fifth Season (Note: Credited as Endeavor Content for the first season)

Original release
- Network: HBO Max
- Release: April 7 – April 28, 2022
- Network: Max
- Release: February 8 – April 4, 2024

Tokyo Vice is an American crime drama television series created by J. T. Rogers and based on the 2009 memoir by Jake Adelstein. It stars Ansel Elgort, Ken Watanabe, Rachel Keller, Hideaki Itō, Show Kasamatsu, Ella Rumpf, Rinko Kikuchi, Tomohisa Yamashita, Miki Maya, and Yōsuke Kubozuka. The series centers on Adelstein (Elgort), an American journalist investigating the yakuza in Tokyo. The first season of Tokyo Vice premiered on April 7, 2022, on HBO Max, and the second season premiered on February 8, 2024, on Max. The series received generally positive reviews, with praise for its setting, aesthetic, and characters. In June 2024, the series was canceled after two seasons.

== Premise ==
In 1999, American aspiring investigative journalist Jake Adelstein relocates to Tokyo and secures a job at a major Japanese newspaper, becoming their first foreign journalist. Taken under the wing of a veteran detective in the organized crime squad, Adelstein delves into the dark and dangerous world of the yakuza whilst living under the city's (and the newspaper's) official line that "murder does not happen in Tokyo".

== Cast and characters ==
=== Main ===
- Ansel Elgort as Jake Adelstein, an American journalist from Missouri who moves to Tokyo. The longer he stays, the more he delves into the corruption of Tokyo's seedy underworld, where no one is as they seem.
- Ken Watanabe as Hiroto Katagiri, a detective in the organized crime division of the Tokyo Metropolitan Police Department. He acts as a father figure to Adelstein and helps guide him through the thin and often precarious line between the law and organized crime.
- Rachel Keller as Samantha Porter, an American expatriate living in Tokyo and former Mormon who makes her living as a hostess in the Onyx Club of the Kabukicho district, and later starts her own club. Her clients vary from salarymen to high-end clients and yakuza.
- Hideaki Itō as Jin Miyamoto (season 1; guest season 2), a vice squad detective who is Jake's first contact in the Tokyo police but who is secretly working with the yakuza.
- Show Kasamatsu as Akiro Sato, an enforcer in the Chihara-kai yakuza clan who collects protection money and is Samantha's handler at the Onyx Club. He secretly has a crush on her and is disillusioned by the yakuza lifestyle which he sees as anachronistic.
- Ella Rumpf as Polina (season 1; guest season 2), an Eastern European migrant, and a spendthrift hostess at the Onyx Club with Samantha. A kind-hearted but naive young woman, she came to Tokyo to work as a model but was pulled into the seedy underbelly of Kabukicho.
- Rinko Kikuchi as Emi Maruyama, Adelstein's supervisor and a senior journalist for the Meicho Shimbun newspaper. Maruyama is a composite of the various colleagues and supervisors who worked with the real-life Adelstein during his career.
- Tomohisa Yamashita as Akira, Polina's boyfriend who works at a host club.
- Miki Maya as Shoko Nagata (season 2), a detective from the National Police Agency assigned to Tokyo, who seeks to create a new task force to eradicate organized crime in the city permanently.
- Yōsuke Kubozuka as Naoki Hayama (season 2), a high-ranking yakuza in the Chihara-kai, who is newly released from a 7-year imprisonment and is appointed as Ishida's second-in-command.

=== Recurring ===
- Shun Sugata as Hitoshi Ishida, the leader of the Chihara-kai yakuza clan
- Takaki Uda as Jun "Trendy" Shinohara, Jake's handsome friend and co-worker
- Kosuke Tanaka as Makoto "Tintin" Kurihira, Jake's witty friend and co-worker
- Masato Hagiwara as Duke (season 1), the owner of the Onyx hostess club
- Kōsuke Toyohara as Baku, Jake's by-the-books, racist nationalist boss
- Masayoshi Haneda as Yoshihiro Kume (season 1; guest season 2), Sato's direct superior within the Chihara-kai who is later revealed to be a mole working for the Tozawa organization
- Eugene Nomura as Kobayashi (season 1; guest season 2), Ishida's right-hand man and a high-ranking member of the Chihara-kai
- Kazuya Tanabe as Masamune Yabuki, the second-in-command of the Tozawa yakuza clan
- Nobushige Suematsu as Gen, a member of the Chihara-kai who has an internal conflict with Sato
- Koshi Uehara as Taro, a high-ranking member of the Chihara-kai
- Noémie Nakai as Luna (season 1; guest season 2), the most prestigious hostess at the Onyx club
- Rosaria Mokkhavesa as Malee (season 1), the most esteemed hostess at Onyx
- Ayumi Tanida as Shinzo Tozawa, the leader of the Tozawa yakuza clan, a rival organization to the Chihara-kai, who is trying to establish himself in Tokyo while suffering from an incurable health condition
- Yuka Itaya as Junko Katagiri, Hiroto's wife
- Chisato Yamasaki as Natsumi Katagiri, Hiroto's elder daughter
- Kaho Yamasaki as Shino Katagiri, Hiroto's younger daughter
- Motoki Kobayashi as Haruki Ukai (season 1; guest season 2), a writer and meth user who publishes articles about the Tozawa organization, with their approval
- Jundai Yamada as Matsuo (season 1), a cultured man who becomes one of Samantha's clients and later reveals that he was hired to track her down
- Ayumi Ito as Misaki Taniguchi, Shinzo Tozawa's mistress and a former model
- Bokuzō Masana as Ozaki (season 2; guest season 1), Baku's supervisor and an executive at Meicho
- Keita as Kei Maruyama (season 2; guest season 1), Emi's mentally unstable brother who suffers from severe anxiety
- Makiko Watanabe as Kazuko Tozawa (season 2; guest season 1), Shinzo Tozawa's wife
- Yohei Matsukado as Hagino (season 2; guest season 1), a high-ranking member of the Tozawa organization and a confidant to Kazuko and Misaki
- Masaki Miura as Funaki (season 2; guest season 1), a senior detective and Katagiri's friend
- Atomu Mizuishi as Kaito Sato (season 2; guest season 1), Sato's eager younger brother, who seeks to reconnect, despite their parents' qualms
- Syû Sekimoto as Etsuo (season 2), a low-ranking member of the Chihara-kai
- Takayuki Suzuki as Masahiro Ohno (season 2), a wealthy architect and one of Samantha's best customers at her new hostess club
- Hyunri Lee as Erika (season 2), the retired former owner of Club Destiny, where Samantha first worked as a hostess, who goes into business with Samantha
- Ukyo Nakamura as Daichi (season 2), Erika's son
- Soji Arai as Shingo Murata (season 2), Emi's lover and an editor for the Tokyo Weekly newspaper
- Yoshinori Miyata as Kenji (season 2), the barman at Samantha's club
- Aoi Takeya as Jason Aoki (season 2), a Japanese-American working at the U.S. embassy and Trendy's lover

=== Guest ===
- Jessica Hecht as Willa Adelstein, Jake's mother
- Sarah Sawyer as Jessica Adelstein, Jake's sister who sends him audio letters on tapes and has been in mental health treatment
- Hiroshi Sogabe as Sugita (season 1), the head of the Suzuno insurance company, which manipulates people into debt with the Tozawa organization
- Nanami Kawakami as Yuka (season 1), a young woman Jake hooks up with while hanging out with Sato, later revealed to be a prostitute
- Fumiya Kimura as Koji (season 1), Sato's first recruit within the Chihara-kai
- Renji Ishibashi as Noboru Nakahara, the chairman of the Tozawa organization, and Kazuko's uncle-in-law
- Toru Shinagawa as Koichi Tanaka, an elderly yakuza sōsai
- Sotaro Tanaka as Dr. Shimizu, an underground doctor, who treats members of the Chihara-kai
- Miyuki Matsuda as Inaba, the owner of a host club who pays protection money to the Tozawa organization
- Hajime Inoue as Jotaro Shigematsu, the Minister of Transport, who gets blackmailed by the Tozawa organization
- Kojun Notsu as Ide, a police captain and Katagiri's supervisor
- Akiko Iwase as Rie Sato, Sato's mother
- Danny Burstein as Eddie Adelstein, Jake's father
- Nadia Parkes as Claudine (season 2), a classy, but brazen British hostess and Samantha's biggest earner
- On Nakano as Tats (season 2), the leader of a Bōsōzoku biker gang, whom Jake investigates after a series of motorcycle thefts
- Hinata Arakawa as Chika (season 2), Tats' younger sister and member of his gang
- Geraldine Hughes as Lynn Oberfield (season 2), an FBI agent working with the U.S. Foreign Service at the U.S. embassy in Tokyo
- Kouichirou Kanzaki as Hishinuma (season 2), the elderly leader of the Hishinuma-kai yakuza clan
- Takao Kin as Ota (season 2), a former member of the Chihara-kai, who was exiled to Nagano
- Shoken Kunimoto as Ichikawa (season 2), Hishinuma's lawyer
- Yayoi Sanmi as Sakura Igarashi (season 2), Tozawa's new, younger lover
- Yuta Koga as Shinjiro (season 2), a former member of the Hishinuma-kai, who is hired by Tozawa for an assassination
- Vincent Gale as Dean Kudisch (season 2), the senior editor of the St. Louis Post-Dispatch in America
- Marcel Jeannin as Dr. Edward Walker (season 2), the chief of organ transplantation at the Southern Minnesota Metropolitan General Hospital, where he secretly treated Tozawa
- Shoken Kunimoto as Ichikawa (season 2), the leader of the Ichikawa-gumi, a yakuza organization
- Kako Kariya as Yayoi Taniguchi (season 2), Misaki's mother
- Koshiro Asami as Noguchi (season 2), the CEO of Suzaku Financial and an associate of Tozawa's

== Episodes ==
Season	Episodes	Originally released		
Season	Episodes	First released	Last released	Network
1	8	April 7, 2022	April 28, 2022	HBO Max
2	10	February 8, 2024	April 4, 2024	Max

=== Season 1 (2022) ===
No. overall	No. in season	Title	Directed by	Written by	Original release date
1	1	"The Test"	Michael Mann	J. T. Rogers	April 7, 2022
In 1999, Jake Adelstein, an American criminal investigative journalist, begins working at the Japanese newspaper, the Meicho Shimbun, under the taciturn Emi Murayama. Jake finds out a recently murdered man was in deep debt to a seemingly non-existent company, but is prevented by his superiors from publishing the information. Jake visits the Onyx nightclub with vice squad detective Jin Miyamoto, a Meicho Shimbun contact, and encounters the American hostess Samantha and members of the Chihara-kai yakuza clan. Jake and Miyamoto travel to Kabukicho to report on a man attempting suicide: they witness the man burn himself alive. Jake visits the suicidal man's wife, who tells him her husband was also in debt. Jake then decides to secretly investigate the matter further.
2	2	"Kishi Kaisei"	Josef Kubota Wladyka	Karl Taro Greenfeld	April 7, 2022
Jake struggles to find a sufficient story to placate his superiors while he tries to investigate the deaths. With the money earned working at Onyx, Samantha plans to open her own nightclub. The protection racket led by Chihara-kai in some neighborhoods is challenged by the Tozawa clan: the Chihara-kai oyabun, Hitoshi Ishida, refuses to retaliate, believing an open war with the Tozawa clan would attract significant police attention. When Jake photographs an attempted peace meeting between the clans led by police detective Hiroto Katagiri, he is spotted and prohibited from reporting it. Later, Jake presses Katagiri to give him a story in exchange for keeping quiet.
3	3	"Read The Air"	Josef Kubota Wladyka	Arthur Phillips	April 7, 2022
Katagiri reveals to Jake the budding tension between the Tozawa and Chihara-kai clans, saying the police fear it will escalate to an all-out war. Katagiri invites him to the arrest of two low-level members of the Tozawa clan, which he uses for his story, causing Jake's standing in the office to increase. Katagiri indirectly gives Jake the police's case file on the loan company, which reveals that Aoki's wife was planning to sue the company before he was murdered. Jake finds contact information for the company, but before he can act, he is picked up by members of the Chihara-kai.
4	4	"I Want It That Way"	Hikari	Naomi Iizuka	April 14, 2022
Jake is taken before Ishida, who asks him to find a suspected Tozawa informant in the Chihara-kai. Maruyama decides to help investigate the loan company after a woman commits suicide, but her initial leads are unsuccessful. Akiro Sato, a Chihara-kai enforcer, appears dissatisfied with yakuza life and is tasked with taking Jake on a night out: the pair later encounter Shinzo Tozawa, the leader of the Tozawa gumi. Contrary to Sato's advice, Jake introduces himself. Meanwhile, Samantha's plans to open her own nightclub unravel: one of her clients, Matsuo, reveals that he is pursuing her for money she stole in the past, and one of the girls has revealed her plans to Duke, the owner of Onyx.
5	5	"Everybody Pays"	Hikari	Adam Stein	April 14, 2022
Samantha reveals to Polina, her Onyx co-worker, that she arrived in Tokyo five years ago after stealing $40,000 to escape a Mormon missionary group. Katagiri reveals the Chihara-kai mole to Jake, who then informs Ishida. Ishida tells Jake to investigate "successful" loan companies. Jake interviews Sugita, a loan company manager, who admits to sending people to loan sharks. Jake finds Sugita dead, with a note accepting all blame for the recent deaths. Yoshihiro Kume, Sato's superior, attempts a yubitsume on him for Samantha's actions, but is called out by Ishida as the mole. Hitoshi orders Sato to kill Kume, who instead jumps to his death. Samantha tries to pay Matsuo to lie about her whereabouts, but he declares she is sexually beholden to him or he will expose her. Sato returns to Chihara-kai headquarters to find it has been attacked by the Tozawa gumi, and helps a wounded Ishida fight off the Tozawa goons.
6	6	"The Information Business"	Josef Kubota Wladyka	Jessica Brickman	April 21, 2022
Jake unsuccessfully attempts to find leads on Tozawa through Ukai Haruki, a magazine writer connected to the Tozawa clan, and Misaki, Tozawa's mistress. At a yakuza council meeting to resolve the conflict between the clans, chairman Nakahara orders Tozawa to compensate the Chihara-kai and apologize. It is revealed Nakahara is sponsoring Tozawa to attack the Chihara-kai. Meanwhile, Matsuo tells Samantha her father hired him to track her down. Sato attempts to threaten Matsuo to protect Samantha, but loses his composure and kills him. Ishida tells Jake of a shipment of Tozawa-clan shabu arriving by air. Jake informs Katagiri, who is circumspect and refuses to act, but Miyamoto agrees to lead a raid against the shipment, which reveals nothing. Maruyama forces Jake to write that police incompetence caused the failed raid, effectively ruining his reputation with the police. Miyamoto tells Tozawa that he protected the shipment during the raid and that Jake provided the tip-off.
7	7	"Sometimes They Disappear"	Josef Kubota Wladyka	Brad Caleb Kane	April 21, 2022
After the death of an airport cargo worker, Katagiri suspects Miyamoto is working for the Tozawa clan. Maruyama also suspects Miyamoto after the police simply accept his version of events related to the murder of a young woman. Katagiri tells Miyamoto that evidence against Tozawa is hidden in the police station basement, prompting Miyamoto to attempt to steal it. However, he simply finds a camera pointing at him. Tozawa receives medical injections for his worsening health but collapses during his birthday party. Jake takes Dave Fisch, a hometown friend, to a nightclub where they encounter Misaki. They spend the evening together until Tozawa's men arrive and take her away. Samantha asks Sato to find Polina, who has disappeared: he finds out it is connected to debts she accrued partying with her boyfriend, Akira. After Sato expresses indifference to continuing to search for her, Samantha reaches out to Jake.
8	8	"Yoshino"	Alan Poul	J. T. Rogers	April 28, 2022
Miyamoto agrees to act as a double agent against Tozawa for Katagiri, and tells him that drugs will arrive later at a port warehouse. There, Tozawa threatens Katagiri's family and says he has "dealt with" Miyamoto. Jake and Samantha find out from Ukai that Tozawa operates an off-shore yacht where he offers powerful men sex with trafficked women to later use as blackmail. Akira tells Samantha that Polina's abductors have demanded a ¥10 million ransom, but when she meets him to help rescue Polina, he steals the money Samantha gathered to pay Polina's ransom. Jake is attacked by Tozawa's men. He finds that someone has sent him a videotape showing Polina being killed for rebuffing the advances of a man on board Tozawa's yacht. Having lost all her savings to Akira's scam, Samantha is forced to get a loan from Ishida, who puts Sato in charge of her new nightclub. Sato is then stabbed by Gen, a Chihara-Kai brother, whom Sato had beaten for mocking Sato earlier.

=== Season 2 (2024) ===
No. overall	No. in season	Title	Directed by	Written by	Original release date
9	1	"Don't Ever F**king Miss"	Alan Poul	J. T. Rogers & Brad Caleb Kane	February 8, 2024
Hiroto and Jake recognize the assailants in Polina's murder, one of which is Jotaro Shigematsu, the Vice-Minister of Foreign Affairs. Sato's brother, Kaito, approaches the Chihara-kai to ask for his whereabouts. Kaito is informed of Sato's stabbing and visits him in the hospital. Shortly after, Chihara-kai associates Gen, Taro, Yuta, and Koji arrive to take Sato to Ishida. Worried about potential libel, the Meicho staff debates whether to publish a story about Polina's murder or interview Shigematsu. A fire at the Meicho building destroys all evidence of the murder. Jake learns that the Yoshino sex boat is registered to Misaki, who disclaims any knowledge of it. Katagiri learns Miyamoto has died, with his death reported as a heart attack to avoid any connection between the police and the yakuza. Gen is revealed as Sato's assailant and meets Masamune Yabuki, the second-in-command in the Tozawa gumi, seeking protection: Yabuki instead informs Ishida, who orders Gen's death, but Sato spares him. Yabuki tells Hitoshi of Tozawa's poor health and asks for a truce. Katagiri meets Shigematsu, who tells him he was asked by Tozawa to remove him from the U.S. No Fly List, but that he lacked the power to do so.
10	2	"Be My Number One"	Alan Poul	Karl Taro Greenfeld	February 8, 2024
Jake foregoes reporting on the yakuza to investigate motorcycle thefts. Acting on a tip from Samantha, he infiltrates a biker group led by Tats that steals motorcycles to sell parts on the black market. Naoki Hayama returns as second-in-command of the Chihara-kai after a stint in prison, but he begins to cause issues by demanding extortion money from a club that pays the Tozawa-clan. Sato reluctantly allows Kaito to build a website to sell repossessed sneakers for the yakuza, which proves very successful. Samantha fires Claudine, her most successful hostess, for stealing from the club. She refuses to rehire Claudine, despite losing clients and Sato warning her that she risks the future of her club. Samantha instead recruits her former boss, Erika, to help her successfully recover important clients, especially Masahiro Ohno, a wealthy architect. Katagiri is deemed responsible for causing Miyamoto's death through an unauthorized sting operation, and is demoted to handling minor complaints. Katagiri therefore agrees to join NPA agent Shoko Nagata to head up a new yakuza task force. Misaki and Jake rekindle their relationship.
11	3	"Old Law, New Twist"	Josef Kubota Wladyka	Francine Volpe	February 15, 2024
During discussions of a merger between the Chihara-kai and Hishinuma-kai gumis, Nagata and Katagiri lead a raid on the premises and make multiple arrests. Sato grows closer to Erika. Chika, Tats' younger sister, asks Jake to help her brother after he gets arrested: Jake asks Sato to provide protection for him. Coming off his successful motorcycle story, Maruyama instructs Jake and his colleagues to attend a party held by the U.S. Ambassador to Japan to cultivate sources: Misaki reluctantly agrees to accompany Jake, but leaves panic-stricken after spotting someone associated with Tozawa. Samantha asks Sato to stop Hayama from disrupting the club: he agrees if she finds out the proposed location of a new railway station from Ohno, so Chihara-kai can buy up the surrounding land. Ishida agrees to give Samantha full ownership of the club in exchange for the information. Jake attempts to call Misaki but is unable to. Meanwhile, Tozawa is revealed to have returned from his mysterious absence, and embraces Misaki in his room.
12	4	"Like a New Man"	Josef Kubota Wladyka	Ashley M. Darnall	February 22, 2024
Tozawa agrees with Ishida's idea of the yakuza working together against the police, but harbors anger at Chihara-Kai encroaching on his territory during his absence. Meanwhile, Ishida and Hayama disagree on how to deal with Tozawa's return. Ishida reluctantly agrees to let Hayama and Sato purchase firearms from Ota, a dealer in Nagano. Hayama ends up killing Ota, and he and Sato dispose of the evidence. Fearing Tozawa's wrath, Misaki warns Jake to stay away from her: he later catches sight of Tozawa and follows him. Maruyama tells her boyfriend, Shingo Murata, that she suspects Baku, their boss, set the Meicho fire. Samantha attempts to photograph Ohno's secret documents at his lakehouse, but is caught. Tozawa tells his uncle-in-law, Noboru Nakahara, the chairman of the Tozawa gumi, that Nakahara's men now work for him. Jake then witnesses Nakahara fall to his death.
13	5	"Illness of the Trade"	Takeshi Fukunaga	Adam Stein	February 29, 2024
Jake informs Maruyama of Nakahara's death, which is declared a suicide. Murata, Emi's boyfriend and a magazine editor, tells her a series of companies are listed in Tozawa's wife's name, with Baku affiliated with a right-wing group that has received donations from them. Jake steals Tozawa's medical file showing treatment for liver disease, an occupational yakuza illness caused by the use of alcohol, meth, and unsterilized tattoo needles. Ishida confides to Sato that although Hayama is next in line to become oyabun, he wants Sato to succeed him. Samantha and Ohno agree to leak information about the railway station to Jake and tell Ishida about alternative construction plans, to prevent Ohno from losing his reputation and being thrown off future projects. Jake gives the railway station information to a colleague but the plans are announced publicly before publishing. Ishida and Sato meet Ohno and Samantha at her club to receive the plans when two hooded gunmen arrive, killing Ohno and shooting Ishida multiple times.
14	6	"I Choose You"	Takeshi Fukunaga	Annie Julia Wyman & Joshua Kaplan	March 7, 2024
Despite Chihara-Kai's best efforts, Ishida succumbs to his gunshot wounds. Samantha and Tozawa are questioned by police for the shooting. Samantha draws the tattoo she saw on the shooter's wrist for Jake, which Ukai says is from the Hishinuma-kai, with only two men known to have the tattoo. Jake shares the sketch with Katagiri and Nagata, and Katagiri learns of a junkyard hideout from Hishinuma. There, they find the dead body of one of the gunmen. Hayama persuades Kaito into a suicide mission to kill Tozawa, which is eventually foiled by Sato. Sato is furious at Hayama for coercing Kaito to follow his plan, but Hayama rebukes him, saying his brother is now Chihara-Kai to him. Jake's colleagues link Samantha to the yakuza in their story on the shooting, publicly exposing her as his source. In frustration, Jake leaves for Missouri to attend his father's birthday. Katagiri is then visited at home by the other Hishinuma-kai gunman, Shinjiro, who is seeking his help.
15	7	"The War at Home"	Eva Sørhaug	Brad Caleb Kane	March 14, 2024
Jake reunites with his family and community in Missouri while Katagiri travels with Shinjiro to the District Attorney to commute his potential sentence for co-operating in the investigation. Shinjiro is assassinated in a drive-by shooting by two men on a motorcycle, causing Katagiri to suspect there is a high-ranking Tozawa mole in the police department. Samantha reaches out to Luna, a hostess at Onyx, to employ her girls after the destruction of her club, but is rebuffed. Sato informs Kaito about Hayama's violent tendencies, but Sato is overheard and excommunicated from Chihara-kai by Hayama, who threatens to kill Kaito if Sato doesn't leave. Katagiri uncovers a connection between Tozawa and the hepatology department at a Minneapolis-based medical facility and asks Jake to investigate. Jake blackmails Dr. Walker, the facility's transplant surgeon, into revealing a liver transplant conducted on Tozawa under an assumed name. Jake informs Katagiri about this, who then implores Jake to return to Japan to help. Jake agrees and flies back to Japan the same day, to the dismay of his father. In Japan, two masked men shoot at a club run by Tozawa, with one revealed to be Kaito.
16	8	"The Noble Path"	Eva Sørhaug	Arthur Phillips	March 21, 2024
Members of the Miura gumi are arrested by the FBI in Hawaii. Jake informs Katagiri and Nagata of Tozawa's liver transplant, which may have been illegal under U.S. law, and they explore extradition before Nagata is suddenly relieved of her duties. Meanwhile, Katagiri figures out that Funaki is the Tozawa gumi's high-ranking mole in the police. Yabuki meets with Jake and Katagiri and threatens them to lay off Tozawa: Jake and Hiroto secretly agree to keep working to bring Tozawa down. Sato appears at a bathhouse frequented by Chihara-kai members and demands that Hayama release Kaito from service to the yakuza. Hayama commands the Chihara-kai members present to kill Sato, but Kaito reveals that Hayama murdered Ota, causing the other gumi members to hang back, leading to a one-on-one fight between Sato and Hayama, which culminates in Hayama's death. Sato then assumes the position of oyabun of the clan. Shigematsu is announced to succeed the suddenly resigning Prime Minister of Japan, meaning that Tozawa will soon have the Prime Minister under his control.
17	9	"Consequences"	Josef Kubota Wladyka	Jen Silverman	March 28, 2024
Tozawa is revealed to be an FBI informant against other yakuza clans in exchange for his operation and non-prosecution. Sato proposes alliances with other clans but is rejected and told to align with Tozawa, which he sternly refuses. In response, Tozawa launches an attack against Chihara-kai and Sato barely escapes to a safe house with a handful of men, including Jake, who went to Sato for protection. Tozawa also learns of Misaki and Jake's relationship, but Samantha helps her escape to the safe house. Katagiri instructs Funaki to reveal the secret location of his family to Yabuki, who arrives to kill them. However, Katagiri and Nagata set a trap for Yabuki and arrest him. Angered by Tozawa's mistreatment of her, his wife, Kazuko, approaches Katagiri and reveals proof of an informant agreement signed by her husband that will either be in his hotel safe, or on the Yoshino yacht.
18	10	"Endgame"	Josef Kubota Wladyka	J. T. Rogers	April 4, 2024
Katagiri and Nagata lead simultaneous raids on Tozawa's properties, finding the agreement with the FBI in a safe on his yacht. Jake is tasked with writing the exposé, but Maruyama realizes the Meicho will not run the story, learning that it was Ozaki, a senior executive at the Meicho, who destroyed the tape. However, Ozaki does promise to ruin Shigematsu's bid to become Prime Minister by passing evidence of his accepting bribes from Tozawa to rival members of his political party. Fearing that corruption among the police and the government will prevent Tozawa from ever being brought to justice, Katagiri hands over the FBI agreement to Sato and asks him to pursue yakuza-style justice instead. When Jake protests, Katagiri tells him that sometimes the morally correct choice is not necessarily the best choice. Meanwhile, Tozawa abducts Misaki's mother and demands a meeting with her and Jake to exact retribution for their affair. Instead Misaki tricks him and lures him to a restaurant where Sato, Kazuko, and all the other yakuza leaders confront him about betraying them to the FBI. They leave Tozawa with a knife and the clear expectation that he will expiate his shame by committing suicide, which he does. Thereafter, Sato is officially appointed oyabun of Chihara-kai. Misaki, seeking a normal life without any more danger and excitement, reluctantly decides to cut ties with Jake, while Samantha decides go on a vacation in order to take an extended break from the Tokyo underworld. Katagiri claims to have retired, which Jake doubts, while Maruyama has been offered a new job opportunity by Murata if she wants to leave the Meicho.

== Production ==
=== Development ===
Tokyo Vice was initially developed as a film in 2013, with Daniel Radcliffe attached to star as Adelstein and Anthony Mandler as director; development was advanced enough to where a production start of mid-2014 was set. In June 2019, the project was repurposed for television, receiving an eight-episode order from WarnerMedia for its streaming service HBO Max. Ansel Elgort was hired to star and act as executive producer on the series, with J. T. Rogers to write and Destin Daniel Cretton to direct the pilot. In October, Michael Mann was hired to direct the pilot and serve as an executive producer of the series. On June 7, 2022, HBO Max renewed the series for a second season. On June 8, 2024, Max canceled the series after two seasons.

=== Casting ===
In addition to his executive producing announcement, Ansel Elgort was also set to star. In September 2019, Ken Watanabe was added to the cast. In February 2020, Odessa Young and Ella Rumpf were added to the cast. In March 2020, it was announced that Rinko Kikuchi joined the cast, and that shooting began the previous month in Tokyo. In October 2020, Rachel Keller was cast to replace Young. In September 2021, Hideaki Itō, Show Kasamatsu and Tomohisa Yamashita were announced as series regulars, with Shun Sugata, Masato Hagiwara, Ayumi Tanida and Kōsuke Toyohara joining as recurring. In November 2022 Aoi Takeya and Takayuki Suzuki were announced to be cast.

=== Filming ===
Principal photography on the series began on March 5, 2020. On March 17, 2020, it was announced that production had halted due to the COVID-19 pandemic in Tokyo. Production resumed on November 26, 2020, and concluded on June 8, 2021. Production for the second season started in November 2022 in Tokyo and concluded in August 2023.

Tokyo Vice filmed almost exclusively in Japan, unlike many other western productions which often film limited establishing shots there and take the majority of principal photography back to Los Angeles, Vancouver, or Wellington. Location Manager Masanori Aikawa worked with HBO in order to develop new workflows to shoot in locations never filmed before, and showcased Tokyo in a way no other production has ever captured.

== Release ==
The series premiered on April 7, 2022, with the first three episodes available immediately, followed by two episodes on a weekly basis until the season finale on April 28, 2022. The second season premiered on February 8, 2024 and concluded on April 4, 2024.

HBO Max and its sibling service HBO Go hold streaming rights to the series in countries where either service is available including the United States, Latin America, and certain European and Asian markets, while Wowow, also a co-producer, holds rights in Japan. Elsewhere, international distributor Endeavor Content has sold broadcast/streaming rights to the series to Crave in Canada, Canal+ in France, Paramount+ in Australia, OSN+ in the Middle East and Northern Africa region, Lionsgate Play in India and Starzplay in select European markets including the UK and Ireland. The BBC purchased second-window rights to the series in the UK, and began to air it in November 2022 on BBC One, with all episodes available for six months on the BBC's iPlayer service.

== Reception ==
=== Critical response ===
For the first season, the review aggregator website Rotten Tomatoes reported an approval rating of 85%. The website's critics' consensus reads, "Tokyo Vice's protagonist is its least interesting element, but the intrigue of Japan's underworld and the verisimilitude of its setting make for a seductive slice of neo-noir." Metacritic, which uses a weighted average, assigned a score of 75 out of 100 based on 27 critics, indicating "generally favorable reviews".

For the second season, Rotten Tomatoes reported an approval rating of 93%. The website's critics consensus reads, "Fully settled into its dense cast of compelling characters and rich milieu, Tokyo Vice's sophomore season is a riveting crime chronicle." Metacritic assigned a score of 78 out of 100 based on 9 critics, indicating "generally favorable reviews".

Location Manager Masanori Aikawa earned Tokyo Vice a Location Managers Guild nomination in 2024.
