= Blood and Gifts =

Play by American dramatist J. T. Rogers

- Written by: J. T. Rogers
- Original language: English
- Setting: 1981–91 in Pakistan, America and Afghanistan

Premiere
- Date premiered: September 14, 2010
- Place premiered: Lyttelton Theatre
- Official website

Blood and Gifts is a play by the American playwright J. T. Rogers. Its subject is the struggle for control of Afghanistan during the 1980s, from the American, Soviet, British, Pakistani, and secular Afghan points of view. It premiered in September 2010 at the Lyttelton Theatre, London, starring Lloyd Owen.

The play was originally shorter and in one act. That version, now withdrawn, was presented in 2009 as part of The Great Game: Afghanistan.

== Synopsis ==
In 1981, Central Intelligence Agency operative Jim Warnock arrives in Peshawar as station chief, accidentally meeting his Soviet counterpart Gromov at the airport. He and his MI6 opposite number Simon Craig liaise with the Pakistani Inter-Services Intelligence to supply weapons to Afghan warlords fighting the Soviet occupation of Afghanistan. The Pakistanis insist on retaining control of the weapons supply and on prioritising Gulbuddin Hekmatyar, a right-wing Islamist warlord unpalatable to both Warnock and Craig, though they both acquiesce to the deal. Warnock and the CIA have been banned from setting foot in Afghanistan personally, so he goes to a refugee camp on the Pakistan side of the border to meet with a relatively secular, non-right-wing warlord Abdullah and his western-pop-music-loving right-hand-man Saeed. He agrees to supply them both with weapons in return for information on the situation in Afghanistan. Warnock is also troubled by his absence from his wife and what he sees as his betrayal of his contacts in Iran after the Islamic Revolution there.

After four years, Warnock returns to the USA, where his wife miscarries a long-hoped-for daughter before giving birth to a son. Warnock also coordinates a US visit and speech by Abdullah which convinces a wealthy senator to donate to the cause. Against the wishes of Warnock's superior Walter Barnes, who believes such a move might backfire in the future and removes all trace of deniability, a US committee votes to supply the Afghan warlords with Stinger missiles. Warnock returns to Afghanistan where he refuses Gromov's plea to let the Soviets retreat with dignity and alienates Craig by continuing to support Pakistan's backing of Hekmatyar. He meets Gromov as he departs Peshawar and then has a final meeting with Abdullah (this time in Afghanistan) before going back to the USA. He learns from Abdullah that Saeed has been killed by the Soviets and that Saeed was in fact Abdullah's son, a fact he had not previously revealed to Warnock. Warnock asks to buy back the Stinger missiles but learns Abdullah has sold them to Iran and allied himself with Hekmatyar until the Soviets are finally defeated. Abdullah then closes the play with a warning that the Mujahadeen will defeat the Soviets then "cross oceans" to spread Islamism.

== Principal cast (UK premiere) ==
- Saeed - Philip Arditti
- Military Clerk - Danny Ashok
- CIA Analyst - Nick Barber
- Senator Jefferson Birch - Duncan Bell
- Abdullah - Demosthenes Chrysan
- A Mujahid - Kammy Darweish
- Administrative Aide - Ian Drysdale
- A Soldier - Craige Els
- A Mujahid - Robert Gilbert
- Political Speechwriter - Mark Healy
- Simon Craig - Adam James
- Walter Barnes - Simon Kunz
- Colonel Afridi - Gerald Kyd
- Ensemble - Katie Lightfoot
- Gromov - Matthew Marsh
- James 'Jim' Warnock - Lloyd Owen
- Staffer - Jessica Regan
- A Mujahid - Nabil Stuart

== Principal cast (New York premiere) ==
- Saeed - Pej Vahdat
- Military Clerk - Andrés Munar
- CIA Analyst - Andrés Munar
- Senator Jefferson Birch - Robert Hogan
- Abdullah Khan - Bernard White
- Political Speechwriter - Andrew Weems
- Simon Craig - Jefferson Mays
- Walter Barnes - John Procaccino
- Colonel Afridi - Gabriel Ruiz
- Dmitri Gromov - Michael Aronov
- James 'Jim' Warnock - Jeremy Davidson
- Congressional Staffer - Liv Rooth

== Reception ==
The play received largely positive reviews. Michael Billington of The Guardian gave the production 4 stars, praising Rogers for a "complex, demanding play" and calling it "a compelling political thriller that exposes the naivety and arrogance that contributed to the current tragic impasse". Fiona Mountford gave the play 5 stars in her review in the Evening Standard and felt the play was "the most clear-eyed dramatic assessment to date of the current situation."

On the New York premiere, Charles Isherwood of The New York Times called it a "first-rate production" of an "engrossing, illuminating play". The New York Times also made it a "Critic's Pick".
