= Jake Adelstein =

American journalist (born 1969)

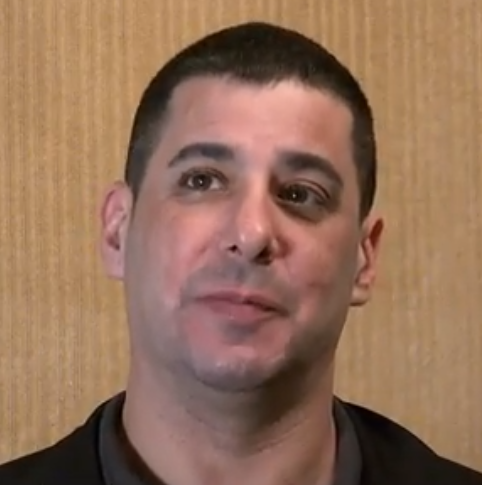
- In a 2017 interview
- Born: Joshua Lawrence Adelstein; March 28, 1969 (age 57); Columbia, Missouri, U.S.
- Occupations: Investigative journalist, writer, editor, blogger
- Children: 2
- Writing career
- Genres: True crime, non-fiction, journalism
- Notable works: Tokyo Vice: An American Reporter on the Police Beat in Japan; The Last Yakuza: A Life in the Japanese Underworld
- Website: Jake Adelstein

Joshua Lawrence "Jake" Adelstein (born March 28, 1969) is an American journalist, crime writer, and blogger who has spent most of his career in Japan. He is the author of Tokyo Vice: An American Reporter on the Police Beat in Japan, which inspired the 2022 Max original streaming television series Tokyo Vice, starring Ansel Elgort as Adelstein.

== Early life ==
Adelstein grew up in Columbia, Missouri and graduated from Rock Bridge High School. As a teenager he volunteered at KOPN and co-hosted a punk music program on the air. In 1988, he moved to Japan at age 19 to study Japanese literature in English at Sophia University.

== Career ==
On April 15, 1993, Adelstein became the first non-Japanese staff writer at the Yomiuri Shimbun newspaper in Urawa, Saitama, where he worked for 12 years.

After leaving the Yomiuri, Adelstein published an exposé of how an alleged crime boss, Tadamasa Goto, made a deal with the FBI to gain entry to the United States for a liver transplant at the University of California Los Angeles (UCLA). In 2009, Adelstein published a memoir about his career as a reporter in Japan, Tokyo Vice, in which he accused Goto of threatening to kill him over the story. An April 2022 article by The Hollywood Reporter raised doubts about the veracity of the events described in the memoir and the many quotes he has attributed to anonymous sources in his journalism. According to the article, Adelstein initially offered to provide evidence that his anonymous sources existed, but then declined to do so. In November 2022, Esquire reported that Adelstein had released via Twitter a folder of source materials which he claimed supported his versions of events. In June 2023, a team of three European investigative journalists published an article in Belgian magazine Le Soir that also cast doubt on the content of his memoir, as well as his career at the Yoimiuri. The Japanese newspaper went on record for the first time about Adelstein in the article, stating that he was never part of the reporting teams for organized crime and had written only a very few articles about the yakuza during his time there. Tomohiko Suzukione of Japan's foremost yakuza experts, responded to followers questioning the credibility of Tokyo Vice, stating, "I don't trust it at all." He further questioned the very notion that Adelstein is treated as a yakuza expert in the United States.

Adelstein was subsequently a reporter for a United States Department of State investigation into human trafficking in Japan, and now writes for the Daily Beast, Vice News, The Japan Times and other publications.

On April 19, 2011, Adelstein filed a lawsuit against National Geographic Television, which had hired him to help make a documentary about the yakuza, citing ethical problems with their behavior in Japan. However, the court dismissed the case with prejudice, meaning the plaintiff is barred from bringing that claim in another court.

== Personal life ==
Adelstein is Jewish. Jake was formerly married to Sunao Adelstein with two children; both of them live in Missouri due to threats made by Goto in 2005 towards them. As of January 2026 he now resides in Tokyo with his Brazilian girlfriend Jessy Nakamura.

== Works ==
- Adelstein, Jake (2009). Tokyo Vice: An American Reporter on the Police Beat in Japan. New York: Pantheon Books. ISBN 978-0-307-37879-8. OCLC 699874898.
- Operation Tropical Storm: How an FBI Jewish-Japanese Special Agent Snared a Yakuza Boss in Hawaii (Kindle Single). ASIN B00Z7DUV7W. June 7, 2015
- —— (2017). Pay the Devil in Bitcoin: The Creation of a Cryptocurrency and How Half a Billion Dollars of It Vanished from Japan. New York City: Pantheon Books.
- —— (2023). The Last Yakuza: A Life in the Japanese Underworld. Minneapolis, Minn.: Scribe Publications.
- The Evaporated: Gone with the Gods. Campside Media and Sony Music Entertainment. 2023.
- Witnessed: Night Shift. Campside Media and Sony Music Entertainment. September 1, 2024.
- —— (2024). Tokyo Noir: In and Out of Japan's Underworld. Minneapolis, Minn.: Scribe. ISBN 9781957363912. OCLC 1415747543.
- —— (October 2025). The Devil Takes Bitcoin: Cryptocurrency Crimes and the Japanese Connection. Minneapolis, Minn.: Scribe. ISBN 9781964992174.
- —— (February 2027). Code Blue: The Serial Killer, the Cover-Up, and a Two-Generation Quest for Justice. Minneapolis, Minn.: Scribe. ISBN 9781964992549.

== Interviews ==
- "How I escaped the Japanese gangsters who wanted to kill me": Jake Adelstein, The Times
- "Hard Lessons Learned from Tough People"—Jake Adelstein at TEDxKyoto 2012
