= Tom Watson, Baron Watson of Wyre Forest =

British politician (born 1967)

The Right Honourable The Lord Watson of Wyre Forest
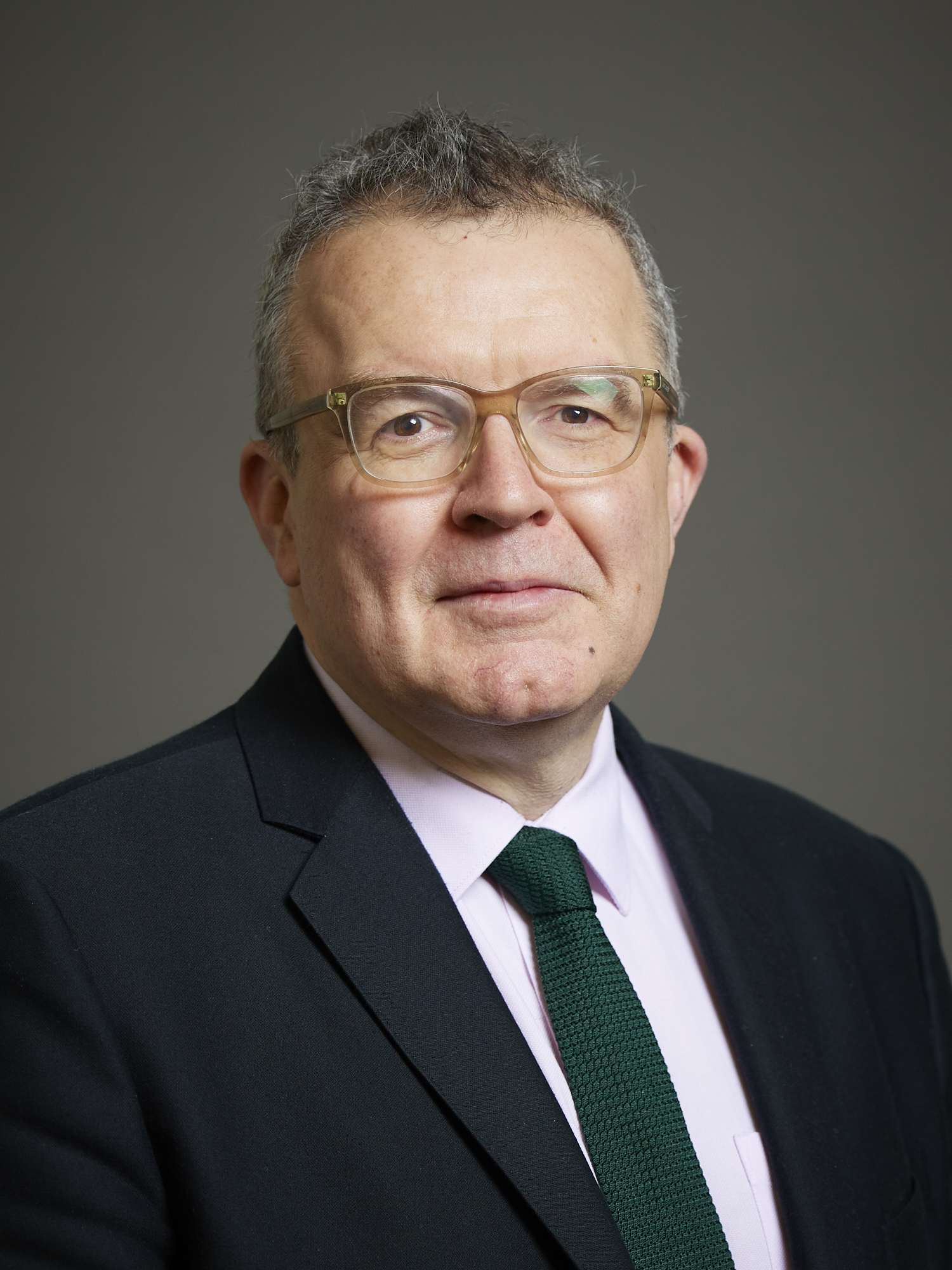
- Official portrait, 2023

Deputy Leader of the Labour Party
- In office 12 September 2015 – 12 December 2019
- Leader: Jeremy Corbyn
- Preceded by: Harriet Harman
- Succeeded by: Angela Rayner (Note: Office vacant from December 2019 to April 2020.)

Minister for Digital Engagement and Civil Service Issues
- In office 25 January 2008 – 5 June 2009
- Prime Minister: Gordon Brown
- Preceded by: Gillian Merron
- Succeeded by: Dawn Butler

Parliamentary Under-Secretary of State for Veterans
- In office 5 May 2006 – 6 September 2006
- Prime Minister: Tony Blair
- Preceded by: Don Touhig
- Succeeded by: Derek Twigg

Member of the House of Lords
- Lord Temporal
- Life peerage 21 November 2022

Member of Parliament for West Bromwich East
- In office 7 June 2001 – 6 November 2019
- Preceded by: Peter Snape
- Succeeded by: Nicola Richards
Government whip offices
2007–2008	Assistant Whip
2005–2006	Lord Commissioner
2004–2005	Assistant Whip
Shadow cabinet portfolios
2016–2019	Digital, Culture, Media and Sport
2015–2017	Party Chair
2015–2016	Cabinet Office
2011–2013	Deputy Party Chair
2011–2013	National Campaign Coordinator

Personal details
- Born: Thomas Anthony Watson; 8 January 1967 (age 59) Sheffield, West Riding of Yorkshire, England
- Party: Labour
- Spouse: Siobhan Corby (m. 2000; sep. 2012)
- Children: 2
- Education: University of Hull (did not graduate)

Thomas Anthony Watson, Baron Watson of Wyre Forest (born 8 January 1967) is a British politician who served as Deputy Leader of the Labour Party from 2015 to 2019. A member of the House of Lords since 2022, he was the member of Parliament (MP) for West Bromwich East from 2001 to 2019.

Born in Sheffield, Watson was raised in Kidderminster, where he was educated at King Charles I School. He first became involved in Labour Party and trade-union activism while studying at the University of Hull and was chair of the National Organisation of Labour Students from 1992 to 1993. After working in marketing and advertising, he began working full-time for the Labour Party, including on its 1997 general election campaign, and then for the Amalgamated Engineering and Electrical Union.

Elected MP for West Bromwich East at the 2001 general election, Watson was Parliamentary Under-Secretary of State for Veterans from May to September 2006 and Parliamentary Secretary for the Cabinet Office from 2008 to 2009. In October 2011, Ed Miliband appointed him as the Labour Party's national campaign coordinator and deputy chair. He resigned from both roles in July 2013, following a controversy over the selection of a new parliamentary candidate for Falkirk.

On 12 September 2015, Watson was elected as Deputy Leader of the Labour Party alongside the new leader, Jeremy Corbyn. Following the conviction of Carl Beech in July 2019 for making false allegations of paedophilia, Watson was criticised by high-profile victims and their relatives for his role in the affair, known as Operation Midland.

In November 2019, Watson announced that he would not seek re-election as an MP at the 2019 general election and also that he would also resign as deputy leader of the Labour Party stating that his reasons for doing so were "personal, not political". He later revealed that he had voted for Owen Smith in the 2016 leadership election. In March 2020, he was appointed chair of UK Music and later that year was made a senior adviser on problem gambling to Flutter Entertainment. In September 2026 he joined Palantir, a US tech firm known for its controversial data analysis and surveillance contracts, as a senior vice president.

== Early life and career ==
Watson was born in Sheffield, West Riding of Yorkshire, and educated at King Charles I School, Kidderminster, although he left before completing his A-Levels. At the age of 17, in 1984, he became a trainee library assistant at the Labour Party’s Walworth Road headquarters. He then worked as a marketing officer and advertising account executive.

He later studied as a mature student at the University of Hull, where he was active in the Hull University Labour Club and elected President of the Students' union in 1992, although he did not complete his degree. He was chair of the National Organisation of Labour Students from 1992 to 1993.

In 1993, he again worked for the Labour Party as National Development Officer for Youth and then worked on the party's 1997 general election campaign. He then left to become the National Political Officer of the Amalgamated Engineering and Electrical Union.

== Early parliamentary career ==
Watson was elected MP for West Bromwich East at the 2001 general election. He served on the Home Affairs Select Committee from 2001 to 2003, and supported the committee's recommendation on UK drug policy to "initiate a discussion within the Commission on Narcotic Drugs of alternative ways – including the possibility of legalisation and regulation – to tackle the global drugs dilemma". In his first year in parliament, he launched a campaign to ban album sales of convicted sex offender Gary Glitter.

In 2002, Watson moved a Ten Minute Rule Bill to change organ donation laws. Later that year, he was a leading candidate for the chair of the Labour Friends of Israel alongside Stephen Byers.

In 2003, Watson voted in favour of going to war with Iraq, and subsequently voted consistently against an investigation into the war.

In 2004 he won the New Statesman New Media Award in the category of elected representative for being one of the first MPs to use his blog to further the democratic process.

Watson was campaign chair for Labour in the Birmingham Hodge Hill by-election in July 2004. The campaign drew criticism for its dirty tactics, particularly a Labour leaflet proclaiming "Labour is on your side – the Lib Dems are on the side of failed asylum seekers", for which Watson later admitted responsibility and expressed regrets.

== In government ==
Watson was appointed as an assistant government whip in September 2004. He was promoted in May 2006 to Parliamentary Under-Secretary of State for Veterans and was instrumental in ensuring that soldiers shot for cowardice in the First World War received posthumous pardons. On 5 September 2006, it was reported he had signed a letter to Tony Blair urging the Prime Minister's resignation to end the uncertainty over his succession. The Chief Whip, Jacqui Smith, told Watson that evening to either withdraw his signature to the letter or resign his post. On 6 September 2006, he resigned his ministerial position and released a further statement calling on Blair to resign. Blair was quoted by the BBC as saying the statement and letter from Watson were "disloyal, discourteous and wrong" and that he would be seeing Watson later that day.

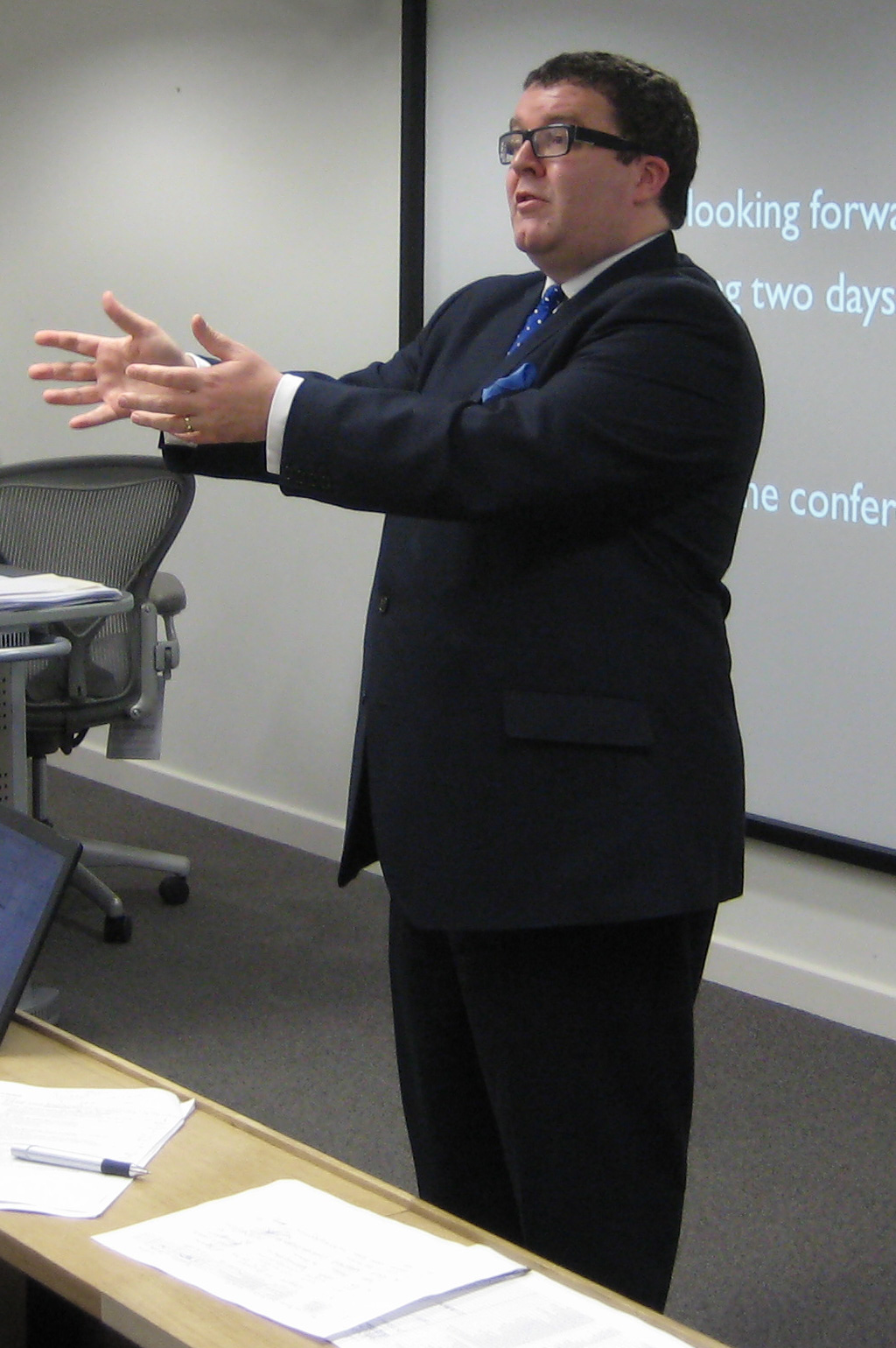
Watson in 2009

Watson returned as a government whip in July 2007, after Gordon Brown became prime minister. As Parliamentary Secretary for the Cabinet Office from January 2008 to June 2009, he was Minister for Digital Engagement and Civil Service Issues. Watson took a particular interest in digital affairs and in making non-personal government data more available to the public – promoting innovative data use and open source software.

In October 2009 Watson received an apology and was awarded damages from The Sun newspaper for falsely claiming that he had been involved in "a plot to smear the Conservatives".

Watson served on the Culture, Media and Sport Select Committee from July 2009 to September 2012. He led a number of MPs in speaking out firmly against the Digital Economy Act 2010, as the bill was being passed through Parliament in April 2010. He took part in a protest against the bill outside parliament on 24 March 2010.

=== Expenses ===
On 10 May 2009 it was revealed that since being re-elected to parliament in 2005, Watson had claimed the maximum £4,800 allowance for food in a single year. From 2005 to 2009, Watson and Iain Wright claimed over £100,000 on a central London flat they shared. Watson responded that a "pizza wheel" that appeared on a Marks & Spencer receipt he had submitted was given as a free gift after he spent £150 at the store. He added: "All claims were made under the rules set out by the House of Commons authorities. I fully understand why the public expects the system to be reformed. I voted for this last week and only hope that reforms can go even further as quickly as possible."

== Early opposition career ==
In October 2011 Watson was promoted to become the Labour Party National Campaign Coordinator and Deputy Chair of the Labour Party, to work with Jon Trickett and Michael Dugher in the Shadow Cabinet Office, running Labour's elections and campaigns. He resigned from this position in July 2013, in light of the 2013 Labour Party Falkirk candidate selection row.

In 2013, Watson joined a cross-party campaign in support of a referendum on Britain's membership of the European Union. He supported an amendment by the Conservative MP Adam Afriyie which called for a referendum to be held before the 2015 general election.

=== Media ===
Watson has been critical of conservative former Fox News host Glenn Beck, claiming Beck's "type of journalism is dangerous and can have wide-ranging negative effects on society. The kind of material broadcast by Glenn Beck is not unique; a number of other 'shock jocks' operate in the States. However, none has displayed intolerance on such a frequent and irresponsible scale as Glenn Beck. It is vital that that kind of 'news' is not made or broadcast in the UK. However, the proposed acquisition of BSkyB by News Corporation means that there is an increased chance of it becoming a reality."

Watson played a significant role in the News International phone hacking scandal by helping to bring the series of events at the News of the World into the open. As a member of the Culture, Media and Sport Committee, he questioned Rupert and James Murdoch, along with former News of the World editor Rebekah Brooks, in a Committee session on 19 July 2011. After the subsequent re-questioning of James Murdoch on 10 November 2011, Watson likened him to a mafia boss.

In July 2011 it was announced that Watson and his co-author Martin Hickman, a journalist from The Independent, were writing a book dealing with the relationship between newspapers belonging to Rupert Murdoch's News International and senior British politicians and police officers. Watson wrote his book at the same time as The Guardian journalist Nick Davies was writing his, which was subsequently released as Hack Attack: How the Truth Caught Up with Rupert Murdoch. Watson and Davies subsequently met and discussed their respective projects. The publication date and title of Watson's book, Dial M for Murdoch: News Corporation and the Corruption of Britain, were released just three days before it was due to go on sale amid fears News International would try to prevent the launch. On the day details of the book were revealed, Watson indicated on his blog his belief that the book would be controversial: "Very excited to say we've finally finished the book. It's out this Thursday. I have a hunch it will be one of the most attacked books this year."

=== Operation Midland ===
On 24 October 2012, Watson suggested in the House of Commons that a paedophile network may have existed in the past at a high level, protected by connections to Parliament and involving a close aide to a former Prime Minister; neither the aide nor the former Prime Minister was named. He called on the Metropolitan Police to reopen a closed criminal inquiry into previous allegations. These allegations were based upon information provided to him by an NHS doctor to whom a disclosure of alleged abuse had been made by the man claiming to be a victim. In an interview with Kevin Maguire of the Daily Mirror at the University of Warwick, Watson gave the account of the information that had been presented to him, on which he based his call for an investigation. In December 2012, the Metropolitan Police stated that, after Watson had passed information to them, they had established Operation Fairbank to investigate the allegations. However, by March 2016 The Daily Telegraph reported that Operation Fairbank caused much speculation on the internet but made little progress in exposing the alleged paedophile ring. In 2015, Watson was criticised for consistently refusing to comment after it was revealed that the police had been pushed into investigating rape allegations against Leon Brittan by Watson, who wrote to the Director of Public Prosecutions, and that the police later had to apologise that Brittan's family were not told that the case was dropped before his death. Watson had repeated the allegations after the death. The rape allegations were examined by the Metropolitan Police but officers could not find evidence that would lead to further action. The person making the original allegations, Carl Beech, was later found guilty of making up the Westminster VIP paedophile ring.

Watson was described in March 2019 at the Independent Inquiry into Child Sexual Abuse by lawyers for the falsely accused former MP, Harvey Proctor, as a "vehicle for conspiracy theorists". After Beech's conviction in July 2019, Lady Brittan said: “It is too late for Tom Watson to apologise but his attempt to distance himself from the false allegations of Carl Beech in the wake of the guilty verdict is disingenuous and untruthful". Harvey Proctor said "The Metropolitan Police were lapdogs to Mr Watson's crude dog whistle. It's time for the torchlight to take a closer look at Mr Watson. It is now beyond doubt that all of these allegations could never have been true and only someone with spectacular bad judgement could think that they might be. It is time for an apology from him to me..." Proctor added, "He denies it now, but he was the cheerleader in chief for Mr Beech. He was in the team. Tom Watson scared the Metropolitan Police to death over phone hacking. He intended to do the same for historic child sexual abuse. Not because Tom Watson has got any interest in historic child sexual abuse. Tom Watson has got a great interest in himself, and in grandstanding, just as he is doing currently on his so-called anti-Semitism campaign." Proctor later asked the Labour Party to suspend Watson and to investigate his behaviour on the grounds of breaching the party's membership code and bringing it into disrepute. Lord Bramall's son also demanded an apology. One of the daughters of the late Greville Janner, who was also accused by Beech, Rabbi Janner-Klausner, said "We have a system where people are believed instantly before the evidence is examined instead of being listened to compassionately and the allegations properly investigated. People were able to accuse (my father) without a shred of evidence and were believed straight away." Daniel Janner QC, his son, said "Tom Watson should resign. He appointed himself Britain’s chief paedo-finder general and created a moral panic. His motive was personal political advancement riding on a bandwagon of public frenzy which he had whipped up. He should hang his head in shame. For him to take the moral high ground in the Labour Party against antisemitism is completely hypocritical."

Watson had also lobbied successfully Alison Saunders, the Director of Public Prosecutions to reopen Operation Vincente, an investigation into an alleged rape in 1967 by Leon Brittan. The police had concluded initially that the allegation, made in 2014 by a woman with a history of mental health problems, was false. As a result of reopening the case, Brittan was interviewed under caution and was not told before his death that there was insufficient evidence to prosecute him.

In October 2019, details of the Henriques report emerged. The report said, of Watson, "His interest, however, in both Operation Midland and Operation Vincente created further pressure upon MPS officers.”; specifically, “A possible inference is that the officers, then responsible, were in a state of panic induced by Mr Watson’s letter.” It adds that Watson described Lord Brittan as being as “close to evil as any human being could be”, saying he “grossly insulted” the former home secretary. Harvey Proctor said: “The problem was that the police assigned to interview Beech lacked common sense and yielded to intense pressure from Tom Watson, an irresponsible politician out for his own publicity in order to galvanise his advancement to become deputy leader of the Labour party.” Lady Brittan said “The extent of Tom Watson’s involvement in the witch-hunt of innocent people has been laid bare. His subsequent attempts to distance himself show a complete lack of integrity. By misusing his public office to recklessly repeat false allegations, and to characterise himself as a victim, he has shown that he is unfit to hold the office of MP.”

== Deputy Leader of the Labour Party ==
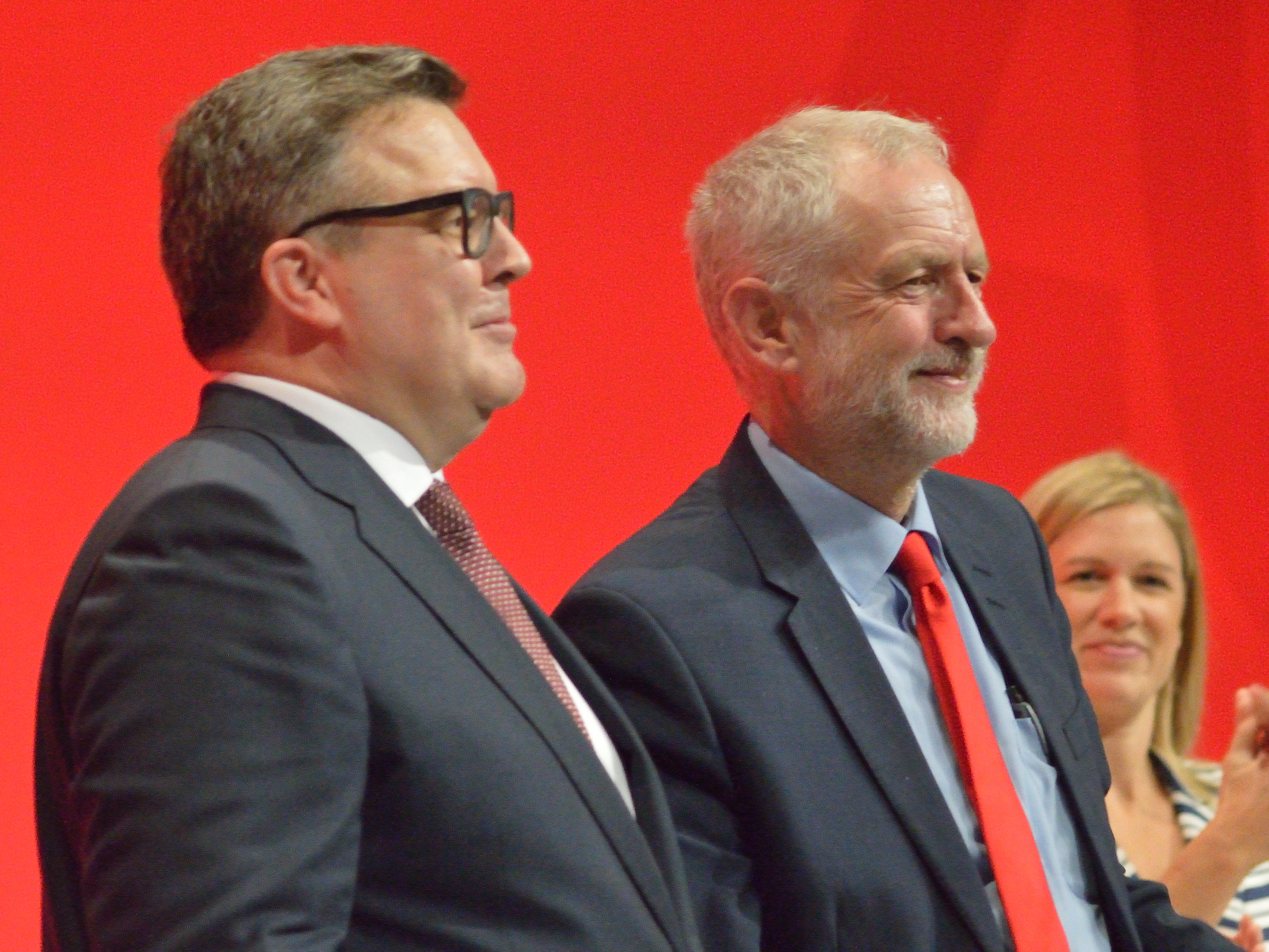
Watson and Labour leader Jeremy Corbyn at the 2016 Labour Party Conference

On 8 May 2015, the day after the Labour Party lost the general election, Watson announced his intention to stand in the ensuing deputy leadership election, becoming the first to declare. Watson was nominated by 59 Members of Parliament, more than any other candidate, and quickly emerged as the front runner. On 12 September he was elected as Deputy Leader of the Labour Party with 198,962 votes or 50.7% in the third round, including second preference votes from those who voted for other candidates. He was also appointed Chair of the Labour Party and Shadow Minister for the Cabinet Office by new Labour leader Jeremy Corbyn. In 2019 after he stood down both as an MP and as Deputy Leader he said he had voted for Owen Smith in the 2016 Leadership election.

Watson was the Vice Chair of Trade Union Friends of Israel (TUFI) as of 2015.

In December 2015, Watson spoke about Labour members who took part in a vigil against proposed UK airstrikes on Syria outside the office of Stella Creasy MP, saying that "if there were Labour party members on that [anti-war] demonstration, intimidating staff members of an MP like that, then I think they should be removed from the party." His spokesman later said that Watson was unaware that the office was empty at the time.

In October 2016, Watson abstained, along with 100 other Labour MPs who abstained on or voted against the Labour Party's unsuccessful motion to withdraw UK support from the Saudi Arabian–led intervention in Yemen. The Saudi Arabian-led intervention in Yemen had led to thousands of civilian casualties.

In October 2017, Watson called on MPs and the public to go on hunger strike for a day, in support of two Guantánamo Bay detainees also on hunger strike, after the US government changed its policy on prisoners who refuse food; they will not be fed at all, instead of being force fed.

In the October 2016 shadow cabinet reshuffle, Watson was made Shadow Secretary of State for Culture, Media and Sport. In that role, he called for greater scrutiny of a planned takeover of Sky UK by Murdoch-owned Fox, backed the TV licence fee, criticised government pressure on Ofcom in relation to regulation of the BBC, and proposed fairer rail ticketing for football fans. In 2017, he announced the Labour Party would launch a review of the NHS treatment of gambling addiction. The review was published in 2018 which proposed a blanket ban in the use of credit cards for betting.

In June 2017, Ian Lavery replaced Watson as Labour Party Chair.

In March 2018, Watson backed calls for a statue to be erected in memory of women's rights campaigner Mary Wollstonecraft.

In September 2018, Watson vowed that if Labour won the next general election he would set up an independent, cross-party commission to investigate ways of preventing type-2 diabetes, with the aim of eliminating the estimated rise in cases within five years.

Following defections of Labour MPs in 2019 to The Independent Group, later Change UK, Watson set up the Future Britain Group of Labour politicians. He was criticised for continuing to accept funding from property developer David Garrard, who was reported to have given Change UK £1.5 million and to have financially supported Joan Ryan and Ian Austin since their departure from Labour. Watson has also received funding from businessman Trevor Chinn.

In July 2019, Watson was criticised by Labour's General Secretary Jennie Formby for being irresponsible in criticising Labour's handling of antisemitism claims. Formby said he risked exacerbating fears in the Jewish community and that, while antisemitism was a real problem, steps had been taken to tackle it. Watson had asked for a copy of the party response to a request by the Equality and Human Rights Commission to be released to the Shadow Cabinet and the NEC, which Formby said she had already offered sight of to Watson (she did not address the subject of releasing it to the rest of the Shadow Cabinet and NEC), and had previously asked to be copied in on individual complaints, which had data protection issues. In response to Watson's claim that the party's response to the Panorama programme Is Labour Anti-Semitic had "smeared" the former Labour staff members and "breached all common standards of decency", Formby stated that all current Labour staff members had access to an "Employee Assistance Programme" but said the party was not made aware of the distress suffered by staff members at the time and she was "very concerned" to hear about it for the first time in the Panorama documentary. Watson was also criticised for attacking Formby when she was undergoing chemotherapy treatment for cancer.

The same month, former Labour and Respect MP George Galloway and former Conservative MP Harvey Proctor announced individually that they planned to stand against Watson at the next general election, Galloway as a pro-Brexit pro-Corbyn independent, and Proctor in protest at Watson's role in the false paedophilia allegations of Operation Midland. July also saw Watson be the subject of a complaint to the Labour Party for making allegedly antisemitic remarks; he had in his Easter message asked readers to recall the arrest of Christ by "a squad of Roman soldiers under the direction of a servant to the High Priest." The complainant, Geoffrey Alderman, said that the fact this was not antisemitic under the IHRA definition adopted by the Labour Party highlighted the definition's "flaws". This was also the month in which cartoonist Steve Bell protested to The Guardian after it refused to run an installment of his long running 'If...' cartoon strip, which portrayed Watson as an "antisemite finder general".

In September 2019, Watson made a speech urging Labour to become a pro-remain party, in order to win back disaffected remain voters. He has been quoted by The Guardian as saying that "most of those who've deserted us over our Brexit policy did so with deep regret and would greatly prefer to come back; they just want us to take an unequivocal position that, whatever happens, we'll fight to remain, and to sound like we mean it." Jeremy Corbyn rejected his proposition, saying that Labour would continue to represent both sides of the Brexit divide.

=== Resignation ===
On 6 November 2019 Watson announced that he would be standing down both as an MP and as Deputy Leader and leave office on 12 December 2019. He stated his decision was "personal, not political" and declared his intention to continue campaigning on health issues. The Jewish Labour Movement described his decision to step down as "shocking and saddening".

Expanding on the reasons for his resignation in an interview in December 2019, he said "two weeks before I resigned, a guy was arrested for giving me a death threat. He was a Labour supporter. The police got in touch and said, 'We've arrested this guy', assuming I knew about it. But I didn't. The Labour party had sent out a fundraising email that he had responded to with a death threat. The party reported it to the police, but didn't tell me... the brutality and hostility is real and it's day to day. So I just thought: now's the time to take a leap, do something different. You've had a good innings. You've done good stuff. Go now." His former constituency, West Bromwich East, went to the Conservative Party for the first time since its foundation in 1974, with the Conservatives gaining a 12.1 swing on Labour.

== Later career ==
In March 2020, Watson was appointed chair of UK Music.

In the summer of 2020, Watson participated in the ITV reality programme Don't Rock The Boat, which was broadcast in November 2020.

In September 2020, Watson, who had previously been heavily critical of the gambling industry, took a job as a senior adviser on problem gambling to Flutter Entertainment, which runs the UK gambling companies Paddy Power, Betfair and Sky Bet.

He produced an autobiographical book, Downsizing (2020), and presented a two-part documentary on ITV, Giving Up Sugar for Good (2021), documenting his personal experience of losing seven stone in less than twelve months and putting his type 2 diabetes into remission by following a low-carbohydrate lifestyle.

In January 2025, Watson settled with News Group Newspapers, receiving substantial damages and an apology for "unwarranted intrusion" into his private life by the News of the World newspaper, which included surveillance and the use of false information while he was investigating Rupert Murdoch's newspapers, though NGN denied his phone was hacked between 2009-2011. The legal case was connected to a related claim made by Prince Harry.

In 2026, Watson tried to haste MPs not to induce a resignation against Keir Starmer; using his failed attempt to displace then PM Tony Blair in 2006 as an example, stating to them "not to be as reckless as we were in 2006".

In September 2026, Watson joined Palantir as a senior vice president. The US tech firm is renowned for its controversial contracts with the Israel Defense Forces and US Immigration and Customs Enforcement. In the UK MPs urged the government to drop the NHS' £330m contract with Palantir, and Green party MP Siân Berry highlighted Watson's appointment as an example of the "corrosive revolving door between politics and big business lobbying that has no place in public life".

=== Peerage ===
In January 2020, it was reported that Watson had been nominated for a peerage. According to John Rentoul, who wrote in The Independent, his nomination was subsequently rejected by the House of Lords Appointments Commission, the body that vets nominees for "propriety". Watson is believed to have been rejected owing to his actions surrounding Operation Midland.

In August 2020, it was reported by The Daily Telegraph that Watson was to once again be nominated for a peerage, in this instance by the Labour leader Keir Starmer.

It was announced on 14 October 2022, that as part of the 2022 Special Honours, Watson would receive a life peerage. On 21 November 2022, he was created Baron Watson of Wyre Forest, of Kidderminster in the County of Worcestershire.

== Personal life ==
Watson married Siobhan Corby in 2000. They had two children before separating in 2012. He was later in a relationship with future Labour MP Stephanie Peacock.

In September 2018, during an interview with BBC Radio 4's The Today Programme, Watson revealed that he had been diagnosed with type-2 diabetes but had "reversed" the condition through diet and exercise. Watson explained that, between the summer of 2017 and September 2018, he had lost seven stone (98 lb; 44 kg). He also revealed that he had "battled weight since my early 20s".

Watson is a gamer and a regular reviewer of games for New Statesman and other titles. He finds it relaxing and confessed to spending too much time on Portal 2 while preparing for questions during the hacking story interviews.

He is played by Daniel Ryan in the 2025 ITV drama about the News International phone hacking scandal, The Hack.

== Bibliography ==
- 2012 – Dial M for Murdoch (Allen Lane) ISBN 1-84614-603-8
- 2020 – Downsizing (Kyle Books) ISBN 9780857838759
- 2020 – The House [with Imogen Robertson] (Little, Brown) ISBN 9780751578799

== Notes ==
Parliament of the United Kingdom
Preceded by Peter Snape	Member of Parliament for West Bromwich East; 2001–2019	Succeeded by Nicola Richards
Political offices
Preceded by Gillian Merron	Parliamentary Secretary for the Cabinet Office; 2008–2009	Succeeded by Dawn Butler
Preceded by Lucy Powell	Shadow Minister for the Cabinet Office; 2015–2016	Succeeded by Ian Lavery
Preceded by Kelvin Hopkins	Shadow Secretary of State for Digital, Culture, Media and Sport; 2016–2019	Succeeded by Tracy Brabin
Party political offices
Preceded by Stephen Timms	Deputy Chair of the Labour Party; 2011–2013	Succeeded by Jonathan Ashworth
Preceded by Harriet Harman	Deputy Leader of the Labour Party; 2015–2019	Succeeded by Angela Rayner
Preceded by Harriet Harman	Labour Party Chair; 2015–2017	Succeeded by Ian Lavery
Orders of precedence in the United Kingdom
Preceded by The Lord Peach	Gentlemen; Baron Watson of Wyre Forest	Followed by The Lord Sewell of Sanderstead
