= Rachel Keller (actress) =

American actress (born 1992)

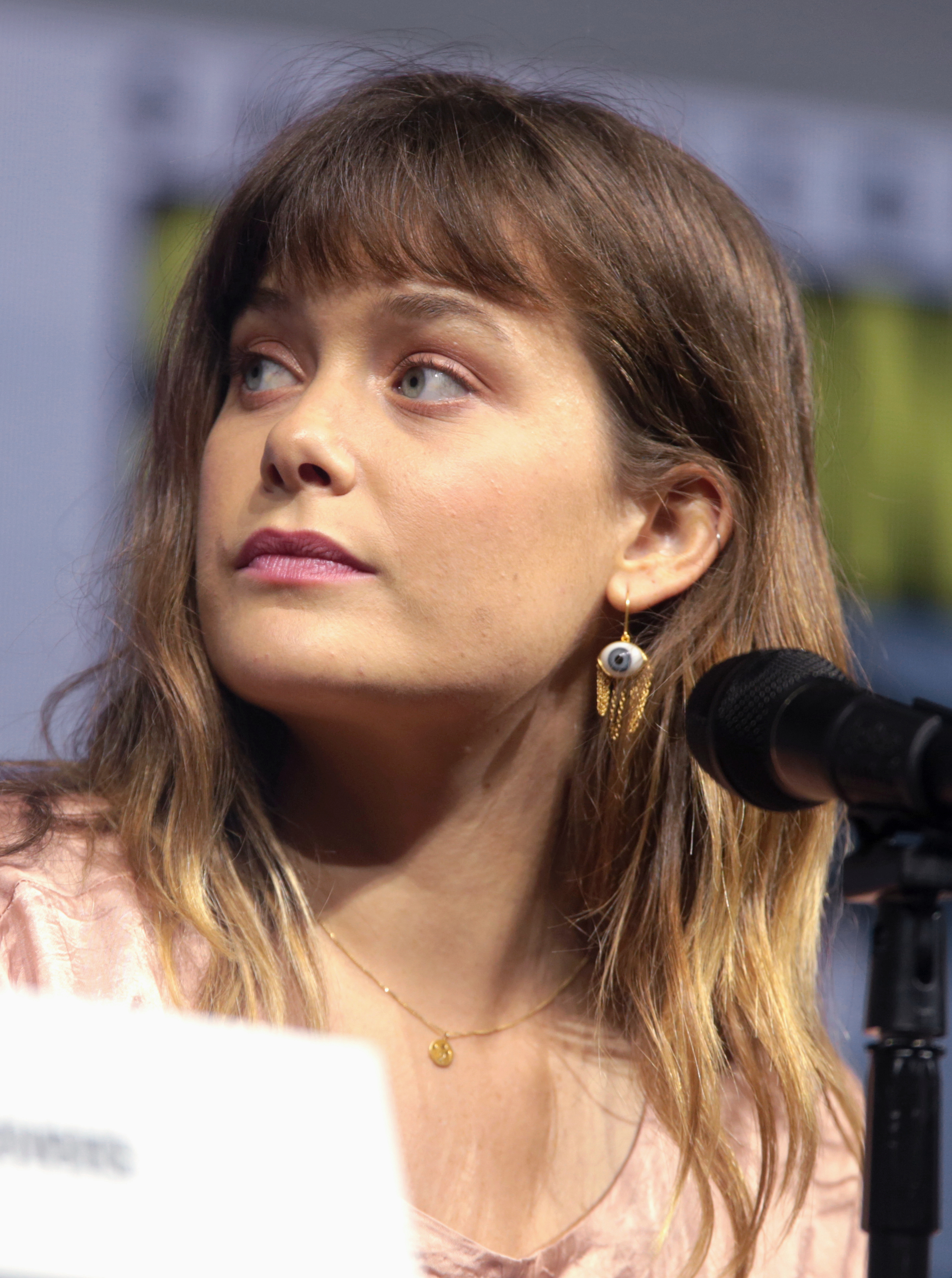
- Keller in 2018
- Born: Rachel Rye Keller; December 25, 1992 (age 33); Los Angeles, California, U.S.
- Education: Carnegie Mellon University (BFA)
- Occupation: Actress
- Years active: 2012–present

Rachel Rye Keller (born December 25, 1992) is an American actress, best known for her roles as Sydney "Syd" Barrett in the FX television series Legion and as Samantha in HBO's Tokyo Vice. She stars in CBS series Cupertino.

== Early life ==
Keller was born in Los Angeles on December 25, 1992, and grew up in Saint Paul, Minnesota. She attended the Saint Paul Conservatory for Performing Artists and graduated in 2014 from Carnegie Mellon University. Keller's father is Jewish, and she celebrates Hanukkah.

== Career ==
Keller began her career with roles in various short films and guest starring roles in the television series The Mentalist and Supernatural.

Keller received wide recognition for her recurring role as Simone Gerhardt in the second season of the FX anthology television series Fargo.

Between 2017 and 2019, she starred as Sydney "Syd" Barrett, the female lead in the FX series Legion.

In 2019, Keller starred as Cassandra Pressman in the Netflix mystery drama series The Society. In 2022, she landed one of the leading roles in the HBO Max series Tokyo Vice, replacing Odessa Young.

== Filmography ==
=== Film ===
Year	Title	Role	Notes	Ref.
2012	I Still Adore You	Cigarette Girl	Short film	
2012	Flutter	Kaylin	Short film	
2014	Hollidaysburg	Tori		
2016	Wig Shop	Shoshana	Short film	
2018	Write When You Get Work	Ruth Duffy		
2018	Diddie Wa Diddie	Janet	Short film	
2019	In the Shadow of the Moon	Jean		
2020	House Sit	Catherine	Short film	
2022	A Man Called Otto	Sonya		
2022	Butcher's Crossing	Francine		
2023	Chestnut	Tyler		
TBA	The First Seal	Jessica Velardi	Post-production	

=== Television ===
Year	Title	Role	Notes	Ref.
2015	The Mentalist	Anne	Episode: "White Orchids" S07E13	
2015	Supernatural	Sister Mathias	Episode: "Paint It Black" S10E16	
2015	Fargo	Simone Gerhardt	7 episodes	
2017–2019	Legion	Sydney "Syd" Barrett	27 episodes	
2019	The Society	Cassandra Pressman	3 episodes	
2020	Dirty John	Linda Kolkena	8 episodes	
2022–2024	Tokyo Vice	Samantha	Main role, 18 episodes	
2026–present	Cupertino	Olivia Siffre	Main role	
