= Dial M for Murdoch =

2012 book about phone hacking scandal

- Author: Tom Watson; Martin Hickman
- Language: English
- Genre: politics and government
- Published: 19 April 2012 Allen Lane
- Publication place: United Kingdom
- Media type: Print (Hardback)
- Pages: 384
- ISBN: 1846146038

Dial M for Murdoch: News Corporation and the Corruption of Britain is a 2012 book written by the British Labour Party MP Tom Watson, and Martin Hickman, a journalist with The Independent newspaper. Published in the United Kingdom on 19 April 2012 by Allen Lane, an imprint of Penguin Books the book deals with the relationship between newspapers belonging to Rupert Murdoch's News International and senior British politicians and police officers, and how the company allegedly used its political influence to mask illegal newsgathering techniques at its London headquarters.

Details of the title and publication date were kept under wraps, with those involved in its production required to sign confidentiality agreements, a move adopted amid fears News International would try to prevent the launch. Allen Lane announced the book's release on 16 April, three days before the publication date. The timeframe between receipt of the final manuscript and the book's publication is believed to be the shortest in Penguin's history. On the day details of the book were revealed, Watson indicated on his blog his belief that the book would be controversial: "Very excited to say we've finally finished the book. It's out this Thursday. I have a hunch it will be one of the most attacked books this year." The title is a play on the 1954 film Dial M for Murder.
