= Oslo (film) =

2021 film made by Bartlett Sher

- Promotional release poster
- Genre: Political drama
- Based on: Oslo by J. T. Rogers
- Screenplay by: J. T. Rogers
- Directed by: Bartlett Sher
- Starring: Andrew Scott; Ruth Wilson; Jeff Wilbusch
- Music by: Zoë Keating; Jeff Russo
- Country of origin: United States
- Original language: English

Production
- Executive producers: J. T. Rogers; Bartlett Sher; Cambra Overend; Marc Platt; Jared LeBoff; Adam Siegel; Kristie Macosko Krieger; Steven Spielberg; David Litvak; Holly Bario
- Producers: Gary Michael Walters; Svetlana Metkina; Michel Litvak; Mark Taylor
- Cinematography: Janusz Kamiński
- Editor: Jay Rabinowitz
- Running time: 118 minutes
- Production companies: HBO Films; Marc Platt Productions; SRO Productions; Bold Films; DreamWorks Pictures

Original release
- Network: HBO
- Release: May 29, 2021

Oslo is a 2021 American political drama television film about the secret negotiation of the Oslo Accords. The film was directed by Bartlett Sher and written by J. T. Rogers, based on Rogers' play of the same name. It stars Andrew Scott, Ruth Wilson, and Jeff Wilbusch. It was released on May 29, 2021, on HBO.

== Plot ==
In December 1992, Mona Juul at the Norwegian Ministry of Foreign Affairs calls her husband Terje Rød-Larsen. Rød-Larsen, who is in Jerusalem, goes to talk to Yossi Beilin. Beilin explains to Terje that the peace talks are at a dead end, because everybody demands everything at once, and Terje offers a new approach. An Israeli meeting a Palestinian on neutral ground.

Mona Juul has a meeting with Ahmed Qurei, the minister of finance of the Palestine Liberation Organization, in London, where Mona and Terje introduce him to Yair Hirschfeld, an Israeli professor of economics. The meeting is secret because Israeli officials were not allowed to talk to Palestinians. It starts cold but warms up and they agree to meet again.

The followup meeting is held in a manor near Oslo, with Qurei and Hassan Asfour as representatives of the Palestinian government and Hirschfeld and Ron Pundak as Israel's representatives. The meeting starts formal and cold, but warms up over time and through socializing and smaller hiccups resulting in a first series of drafts for a Declaration of Principles (DOP).

As neither Hirschfeld nor Pundak are Israeli officials, talks are about to end there. After some back and forth and Terje making unfounded claims that he would get an Israeli official to join the talks, Mona decides to break the secret to Johan Jørgen Holst, the Norwegian minister of foreign affairs, who facilitates a meeting with Uri Savir from the Israeli foreign ministry to review the DOP.

This meeting starts very aggressive with Savir and Qurei accusing each other of terrorism and murder, but again warms up over time with Savir expressing willingness to give up the Gaza Strip and Jericho―a city 20 miles outside of Jerusalem―to the Palestinians as an autonomous region.

Uri Savir then presents the result to Joel Singer, the legal adviser of the Israeli Ministry of Foreign Affairs, who meets with the group to finalize the document with official backing. Instead of finalizing the document, it almost leads to a breakup of the talks over Singer's attempts to rewrite the document. At the request of Hirschfeld, Mona finally breaks her "facilitate only" doctrine and gets involved. She can defuse the situation by sharing her own story about the conflict, which is hinted at by flashbacks throughout the movie.

After that, the Oslo Accord is meant to be finalized through a telephone conference between Shimon Peres and Yasser Arafat. After some trouble getting Arafat, who is residing in exile in Tunis, on the line, they manage to talk to Qurei, who speaks on behalf of Arafat and the rest of the government because he claims to be more proficient in English. After a long conference, they agree to accept each other's legitimacy and postpone the controversial question of Jerusalem, thereby finalizing the negotiation.

The movie ends with a montage of archival footage of the events after the Oslo agreement, such as Yitzhak Rabin saying "We who have fought against you, the Palestinians, we say to you today, in a loud and clear voice: 'enough of blood and tears, enough'" at the White House in September 1993. It also references Rabin's assassination in 1995 and that the status of Jerusalem remained a sticking point, as well as the Second Intifada starting in September 2000. Nonetheless, it still affirms the importance of the Oslo meeting and the dialogue to facilitate a chance for peace.

== Cast ==
- Ruth Wilson as Mona Juul, a diplomat in the Norwegian Ministry of Foreign Affairs
- Andrew Scott as Terje Rød-Larsen, Mona's husband and the director of the Fafo Foundation
- Itzik Cohen as Yossi Beilin, Deputy Foreign Minister of the State of Israel
- Salim Daw as Ahmed Qurei, Minister of Finance of the PLO
- Sasson Gabai as Shimon Peres, Foreign Minister of the State of Israel (credited as Sasson Gabay)
- Dov Glickman as Yair Hirschfeld, a professor of economics at the University of Haifa
- Rotem Keinan as Ron Pundak, Hirschfield’s associate and fellow Israeli professor
- Jeff Wilbusch as Uri Savir, the Director General of the Israeli Ministry of Foreign Affairs
- Igal Naor as Joel Singer, legal adviser of the Israeli Ministry of Foreign Affairs
- Waleed Zuaiter as Hassan Asfour, Qurei's associate and PLO liaison
- Tobias Zilliacus as Jan Egeland, State Secretary at the Norwegian Ministry of Foreign Affairs
- Karel Dobrý as Johan Jørgen Holst, Norwegian Minister of Foreign Affairs

== Production ==
In April 2017, it was reported that the play Oslo would be brought to the screen by producer Marc Platt. It would be adapted for the screen by the playwright J. T. Rogers and directed by Bartlett Sher, the director of the Broadway production. In November 2020, it was reported Oslo had begun production in Prague. The film aired on HBO and stars Andrew Scott and Ruth Wilson.

== Reception ==
On review aggregator Rotten Tomatoes, the film holds a 75% approval rating based on 24 reviews, with an average rating of 6.1/10. The site's critical consensus reads, "Oslo sometimes struggles to smoothly transition from the stage to screen, but Ruth Wilson and Andrew Scott bring an engaging verve to this historical snapshot of high-stakes diplomacy." On Metacritic, the film holds a rating of 54 out of 100, based on 6 critics, indicating "mixed or average reviews".

== Accolades ==
Year	Award	Category	Nominee(s)	Result	Ref.
2021	Gold Derby Awards	TV movie	Oslo	Nominated	
2021	Online Film & Television Association Awards	Best Motion Picture	Oslo	Nominated	
2021	Online Film & Television Association Awards	Best Actress in a Motion Picture or Limited Series	Ruth Wilson	Nominated	
2021	Online Film & Television Association Awards	Best Writing of a Motion Picture or Limited Series	J. T. Rogers	Nominated	
2021	Online Film & Television Association Awards	Best Ensemble in a Motion Picture or Limited Series	Oslo	Nominated	
2021	Primetime Emmy Awards	Outstanding Television Movie	Marc Platt, Steven Spielberg, Kristie Macosko Krieger, David Litvak, Jared LeBoff, Adam Siegel, Cambra Overend, Bartlett Sher, J.T. Rogers, Holly Bario, Matthew Stillman, David Minkowski, Gary Michael Walters, Michel Litvak, Svetlana Metkina, and Mark Taylor	Nominated	
2021	Primetime Emmy Awards	Outstanding Music Composition for a Limited or Anthology Series, Movie or Special (Original Dramatic Score)	Jeff Russo and Zoë Keating	Nominated	
2022	American Cinema Editors Awards	Best Edited Motion Picture (Non-Theatrical)	Jay Rabinowitz	Won	
2022	Artios Awards	Outstanding Achievement in Casting – Film – Non-Theatrical Release	Leslee Feldman	Nominated	
2022	Critics' Choice Television Awards	Best Movie Made for Television	Oslo	Won	
2022	Golden Reel Awards	Outstanding Achievement in Sound Editing – Non-Theatrical Feature	Lewis Goldstein, Gina Alfano, Peter John Still, Alex Soto, Alfred DeGrand, Thomas Ryan, Wen Tseng, Leslie Bloome, and Joanna Fang	Nominated	
2022	Make-Up Artists and Hair Stylists Guild Awards	Best Period and/or Character Make-Up in a Television Special, One Hour or More Live Program Series or Movie for Television	Daniel Parker	Nominated	
2022	Producers Guild of America Awards	Outstanding Producer of Streamed or Televised Motion Picture	Oslo	Nominated	
2022	Satellite Awards	Best Television Film	Oslo	Won	
2022	Satellite Awards	Best Actor in a Miniseries or Television Film	Andrew Scott	Nominated	
2022	Satellite Awards	Best Actress in a Miniseries or Television Film	Ruth Wilson	Nominated	

== See also ==
- Palestine Liberation Organization § Tunis
