= 71st Tony Awards =

2017 US theatrical awards ceremony

- Official poster
- Date: June 11, 2017
- Location: Radio City Music Hall, Manhattan, New York City
- Hosted by: Kevin Spacey

Highlights
- Most wins: Dear Evan Hansen (6)
- Most nominations: Natasha, Pierre & The Great Comet of 1812 (12)
- Website: tonyawards.com

Television/radio coverage
- Network: CBS
- Viewership: 6.0 million
- Produced by: Ricky Kirshner; Glenn Weiss
- Directed by: Glenn Weiss

The 71st Annual Tony Awards were held on June 11, 2017, to recognize achievement in Broadway productions during the 2016–17 season. The ceremony was held at Radio City Music Hall in New York City, and was broadcast live by CBS. Kevin Spacey served as host.

The musical Natasha, Pierre & The Great Comet of 1812 led the nominations with 12, while the play with the most nominations was A Doll's House, Part 2, with eight. At the ceremony, Dear Evan Hansen won six awards, including Best Musical, becoming the production with the most wins of the season. 23-year-old Ben Platt, who played the title character, became the youngest solo winner for Best Actor in a Leading Role in a Musical. 21-year-old Eva Noblezada received her first nomination for Best Actress in a Leading Role in a Musical for her Broadway debut as Kim in Miss Saigon, becoming one of the youngest nominees in Best Actress in a Musical category. The Bette Midler-led revival of Hello, Dolly! won four awards, and The Great Comet won two. The productions of plays Indecent, The Little Foxes, and Oslo each won two awards.

The ceremony received mixed reviews, with many criticizing the performance of Spacey as host. Due to the sexual misconduct allegations against Spacey, the producers announced that it would not be submitted for the 70th Primetime Emmy Awards. However, the show did receive a nomination for Outstanding Lighting Design / Lighting Direction for a Variety Special.

== Eligibility ==
Shows that opened on Broadway during the 2016–2017 season before April 27, 2017, were eligible for consideration.

Original plays

- A Doll's House, Part 2
- The Encounter
- Heisenberg
- Indecent
- Oh, Hello
- Oslo
- The Play That Goes Wrong
- The Present
- Significant Other
- Sweat

Original musicals

- Amélie
- Anastasia
- Bandstand
- A Bronx Tale
- Charlie and the Chocolate Factory
- Come from Away
- Dear Evan Hansen
- Groundhog Day
- Holiday Inn
- In Transit
- Natasha, Pierre & The Great Comet of 1812
- Paramour
- War Paint

Play revivals

- The Cherry Orchard
- The Front Page
- The Glass Menagerie
- Jitney
- Les Liaisons Dangereuses
- The Little Foxes
- Present Laughter
- The Price
- Six Degrees of Separation

Musical revivals

- Cats
- Falsettos
- Hello, Dolly!
- Miss Saigon
- Sunset Boulevard

Notes

- Though the revival of Sunday in the Park with George would be technically eligible for the year's Tony Awards season, its producers elected to withdraw the show in advance from Tony consideration.

== Awards events ==
=== Nominations ===
The Tony Award nominations were announced on May 2, 2017, by Jane Krakowski and Christopher Jackson.

The musical Natasha, Pierre & The Great Comet of 1812 garnered 12 nominations, becoming the most-nominated show of the season. The revival of Hello, Dolly! earned 10 nominations, the musical Dear Evan Hansen earned nine, and the new play A Doll's House, Part 2 earned eight. New musicals Come from Away and Groundhog Day each earned seven nominations, as did the new play Oslo.

=== Other events ===
The annual Meet the Nominees Press Reception took place on May 3, 2017, at the Sofitel New York Hotel. The annual Nominees Luncheon took place on May 23, 2017, at the Rainbow Room. A cocktail party was held on June 5, 2017, at the Sofitel New York Hotel to celebrate the season's Tony Honors for Excellence in the Theatre and Special Award recipients.

== Ceremony ==
=== Presenters ===
The ceremony's presenters included:

- Rachel Bloom – backstage presenter
- Scarlett Johansson – presented Best Featured Actor in a Play
- Ron Duguay – introduced Come from Away
- Scott Bakula and Sutton Foster – presented Best Featured Actor in a Musical
- Lea Salonga and Jon Jon Briones – introduced Miss Saigon
- Tom Sturridge and Olivia Wilde – presented Best Featured Actress in a Play
- Whoopi Goldberg – introduced Falsettos
- Cynthia Erivo and John Legend – presented Best Original Score
- Anna Kendrick – introduced Dear Evan Hansen
- Sally Field – special presentation on the Tonys history
- David Oyelowo and Sarah Paulson – presented Best Actor in a Play
- Kevin Spacey (as Johnny Carson) – introduced Groundhog Day
- Tommy Tune – introduced Hello, Dolly!
- Bette Midler – presented Best Actress in a Play
- Patina Miller and Sara Bareilles – presented Best Featured Actress in a Musical
- Nick Kroll and John Mulaney – introduced The Rockettes performance
- Allison Janney and Christopher Jackson – presented Best Direction of a Play and Best Direction of a Musical
- Uma Thurman – introduced War Paint
- Josh Gad – presented Excellence in Theatre Education Award
- Orlando Bloom – presented Best Revival of a Play
- Keegan-Michael Key – introduced Natasha, Pierre & The Great Comet of 1812
- John Lithgow – presented Best Play
- Jill Biden – introduced Bandstand
- Jonathan Groff and Brian d'Arcy James – presenters of the Creative Arts winners
- Stephen Colbert – presented Best Revival of a Musical
- Mark Hamill – presenter of the In Memoriam tribute
- Tina Fey – presented Best Actor in a Musical
- Glenn Close – presented Best Actress in a Musical
- Lin-Manuel Miranda – presented Best Musical (with help from Frank and Claire Underwood (Robin Wright) from House of Cards)

=== Performances ===
The following shows and performers performed on the ceremony's telecast:

- "Broadway Bound" – Kevin Spacey
- "Welcome to the Rock" – Come from Away
- "I'd Give My Life for You" / "Exodus" – Miss Saigon
- "A Day in Falsettoland" – Falsettos
- "Waving Through a Window" – Dear Evan Hansen
- "Seeing You" – Groundhog Day
- "Penny in My Pocket" – Hello, Dolly!
- "Theme from New York, New York" – Cynthia Erivo, Leslie Odom Jr., and The Rockettes
- "Face to Face" – War Paint
- "Dust and Ashes" / "The Abduction" – Natasha, Pierre & The Great Comet of 1812
- "Nobody" – Bandstand
- "It's So Hard to Say Goodbye to Yesterday" – Justin Guarini, Kevin Smith Kirkwood, Okieriete Onaodowan, David Abeles, and Chuck Cooper
- "The Curtain Falls" – Kevin Spacey and Patti LuPone

== Non-competitive awards ==
The 2017 Tony Honors for Excellence were awarded to general managers Nina Lannan and Alan Wasser. Actor James Earl Jones received the season's Special Tony Award for Lifetime Achievement. The 2017 Isabelle Stevenson Award was awarded to Baayork Lee, "for her commitment to future generations of artists through her work with the National Asian Artists Project and theatre education programs around the world." A special Tony Award for Sound Design was awarded to Gareth Fry and Pete Malkin for The Encounter, following the removal of the competitive sound design awards in 2014. The season's Excellence in Theatre Education Award was awarded to drama teacher Rachel Harry of Hood River Valley High School in Hood River, OR.

== Winners and nominees ==
Sources: Playbill; The New York Times

| Best Play ‡ | Best Musical ‡ |
|---|---|
| Oslo – J. T. Rogers; A Doll's House, Part 2 – Lucas Hnath; Indecent – Paula Vogel; Sweat – Lynn Nottage | Dear Evan Hansen; Come from Away; Groundhog Day; Natasha, Pierre & The Great Comet of 1812 |
| Best Revival of a Play ‡ | Best Revival of a Musical ‡ |
| Jitney; The Little Foxes; Present Laughter; Six Degrees of Separation | Hello, Dolly!; Falsettos; Miss Saigon |
| Best Actor in a Play | Best Actress in a Play |
| Kevin Kline – Present Laughter as Garry Essendine; Denis Arndt – Heisenberg as Alex Priest; Chris Cooper – A Doll's House, Part 2 as Torvald Helmer; Corey Hawkins – Six Degrees of Separation as Paul; Jefferson Mays – Oslo as Terje Rød-Larsen | Laurie Metcalf – A Doll's House, Part 2 as Nora Jorgensen; Cate Blanchett – The Present as Anna Petrovna; Jennifer Ehle – Oslo as Mona Juul; Sally Field – The Glass Menagerie as Amanda Wingfield; Laura Linney – The Little Foxes as Regina Hubbard Giddens |
| Best Actor in a Musical | Best Actress in a Musical |
| Ben Platt – Dear Evan Hansen as Evan Hansen; Christian Borle – Falsettos as Marvin; Josh Groban – Natasha, Pierre & The Great Comet of 1812 as Pierre Bezukhov; Andy Karl – Groundhog Day as Phil Connors; David Hyde Pierce – Hello, Dolly! as Horace Vandergelder | Bette Midler – Hello, Dolly! as Dolly Gallagher Levi; Denée Benton – Natasha, Pierre & The Great Comet of 1812 as Natasha Rostova; Christine Ebersole – War Paint as Elizabeth Arden; Patti LuPone – War Paint as Helena Rubinstein; Eva Noblezada – Miss Saigon as Kim |
| Best Featured Actor in a Play | Best Featured Actress in a Play |
| Michael Aronov – Oslo as Uri Savir; Danny DeVito – The Price as Gregory Solomon; Nathan Lane – The Front Page as Walter Burns; Richard Thomas – The Little Foxes as Horace Giddens; John Douglas Thompson – Jitney as Becker | Cynthia Nixon – The Little Foxes as Birdie Hubbard; Johanna Day – Sweat as Tracey; Jayne Houdyshell – A Doll's House, Part 2 as Anne-Marie; Condola Rashad – A Doll's House, Part 2 as Emmy Helmer; Michelle Wilson – Sweat as Cynthia |
| Best Featured Actor in a Musical | Best Featured Actress in a Musical |
| Gavin Creel – Hello, Dolly! as Cornelius Hackl; Mike Faist – Dear Evan Hansen as Connor Murphy; Andrew Rannells – Falsettos as Whizzer Brown; Lucas Steele – Natasha, Pierre & The Great Comet of 1812 as Anatole Kuragin; Brandon Uranowitz – Falsettos as Mendel | Rachel Bay Jones – Dear Evan Hansen as Heidi Hansen; Kate Baldwin – Hello, Dolly! as Irene Molloy; Stephanie J. Block – Falsettos as Trina; Jenn Colella – Come from Away as Annette, Beverley Bass, and others; Mary Beth Peil – Anastasia as Dowager Empress Maria Feodorovna |
| Best Book of a Musical | Best Original Score (Music and/or Lyrics) Written for the Theatre |
| Steven Levenson – Dear Evan Hansen; Dave Malloy – Natasha, Pierre & The Great Comet of 1812; Danny Rubin – Groundhog Day; Irene Sankoff and David Hein – Come from Away | Benj Pasek and Justin Paul – Dear Evan Hansen; Dave Malloy – Natasha, Pierre & The Great Comet of 1812; Tim Minchin – Groundhog Day; Irene Sankoff and David Hein – Come from Away |
| Best Scenic Design of a Play | Best Scenic Design of a Musical |
| Nigel Hook – The Play That Goes Wrong; David Gallo – Jitney; Douglas W. Schmidt – The Front Page; Michael Yeargan – Oslo | Mimi Lien – Natasha, Pierre & The Great Comet of 1812; Rob Howell – Groundhog Day; David Korins – War Paint; Santo Loquasto – Hello, Dolly! |
| Best Costume Design of a Play | Best Costume Design of a Musical |
| Jane Greenwood – The Little Foxes ∞; Susan Hilferty – Present Laughter; Toni-Leslie James – Jitney; David Zinn – A Doll's House, Part 2 | Santo Loquasto – Hello, Dolly!; Linda Cho – Anastasia; Paloma Young – Natasha, Pierre & The Great Comet of 1812; Catherine Zuber – War Paint |
| Best Lighting Design of a Play | Best Lighting Design of a Musical |
| Christopher Akerlind – Indecent; Jane Cox – Jitney; Donald Holder – Oslo; Jennifer Tipton – A Doll's House, Part 2 | Bradley King – Natasha, Pierre & The Great Comet of 1812; Howell Binkley – Come from Away; Natasha Katz – Hello, Dolly!; Japhy Weideman – Dear Evan Hansen |
| Best Direction of a Play | Best Direction of a Musical |
| Rebecca Taichman – Indecent; Sam Gold – A Doll's House, Part 2; Ruben Santiago-Hudson – Jitney; Bartlett Sher – Oslo; Daniel Sullivan – The Little Foxes | Christopher Ashley – Come from Away; Rachel Chavkin – Natasha, Pierre & The Great Comet of 1812; Michael Greif – Dear Evan Hansen; Matthew Warchus – Groundhog Day; Jerry Zaks – Hello, Dolly! |
| Best Choreography | Best Orchestrations |
| Andy Blankenbuehler – Bandstand; Peter Darling and Ellen Kane – Groundhog Day; Kelly Devine – Come from Away; Denis Jones – Holiday Inn; Sam Pinkleton – Natasha, Pierre & The Great Comet of 1812 | Alex Lacamoire – Dear Evan Hansen; Bill Elliott and Greg Anthony Rassen – Bandstand; Larry Hochman – Hello, Dolly!; Dave Malloy – Natasha, Pierre & The Great Comet of 1812 |

∞ This marks Greenwood's 21st Tony Award nomination and first competitive win.

‡ The award is presented to the producer(s) of the musical or play.

=== Awards and nominations per production ===
| Production | Nominations | Awards |
|---|---|---|
| Natasha, Pierre & The Great Comet of 1812 | 12 | 2 |
| Hello, Dolly! | 10 | 4 |
| Dear Evan Hansen | 9 | 6 |
| A Doll's House, Part 2 | 8 | 1 |
| Come from Away | 7 | 1 |
| Groundhog Day | 7 | 0 |
| Oslo | 7 | 2 |
| Jitney | 6 | 1 |
| The Little Foxes | 6 | 2 |
| Falsettos | 5 | 0 |
| War Paint | 4 | 0 |
| Indecent | 3 | 2 |
| Present Laughter | 3 | 1 |
| Sweat | 3 | 0 |
| Anastasia | 2 | 0 |
| Bandstand | 2 | 1 |
| The Front Page | 2 | 0 |
| Miss Saigon | 2 | 0 |
| Six Degrees of Separation | 2 | 0 |
| The Price | 1 | 0 |
| The Glass Menagerie | 1 | 0 |
| Heisenberg | 1 | 0 |
| Holiday Inn | 1 | 0 |
| The Play That Goes Wrong | 1 | 1 |
| The Present | 1 | 0 |

==== Individuals with multiple nominations ====
- 3: Dave Malloy
- 2: Irene Sankoff and David Hein; Santo Loquasto

== Reception ==
The show received a mixed reception from media publications. On Metacritic, the ceremony has a weighted average score of 53 out of 100, based on 6 reviews, indicating "mixed or average reviews". The Hollywood Reporter columnist David Rooney remarked, "Spacey is a brilliant actor, but warmth and humility are perhaps not his strongest suits. So opening on the defensive, with a messy mashup of songs from current-season musicals that he repurposed to head off any eventual criticism of his hosting performance, started the show on a strained note." The New York Times theatre critic Neil Genzlinger commented, "Sunday night's broadcast of Broadway's annual celebration of itself had trouble figuring out what to do with Kevin Spacey, the evening's host, making use of him in ways that ranged from torturous (the opening number) to tolerable (he does pretty good Johnny Carson and Bill Clinton impressions). It fared far better when it was about the work being honored and the people who did it." Cynthia Littleton from Variety wrote, "The biggest shortcoming was host Kevin Spacey, who just didn't deliver the same kind of engaging effort as his recent predecessors. The contrast was especially sharp against last year's emcee."

The Guardian columnist Alexis Soloski wrote, "The House of Cards actor offered outdated Johnny Carson impressions, a Bobby Darin number and a misfiring gag about Hillary Clinton's emails on a night of occasional shock and unforgivable schtick." IndieWire theatre critic Charles Isherwood commented, "Full of allusions to previous hosts (Neil Patrick Harris, James Corden, Hugh Jackman), it seemed to drag on forever — and was not particularly enlivened by guest appearances by Stephen Colbert and Whoopi Goldberg. Perhaps funny to those in the know, it could only have been mystifying to a wider audience." In addition, television critic Robert Lloyd of the Los Angeles Times remarked, "Kevin Spacey was the somewhat surprising — though certainly not unqualified — host of the 71st running of the Broadway theater-honoring Tony Awards, broadcast Sunday night from New York's Radio City Music Hall."

=== Ratings ===
The ceremony averaged a Nielsen 4.7 ratings/11 share, and was watched by 6 million viewers. The ratings was a 31 percent decrease from previous ceremony's viewership of 8.7 million, becoming the lowest since 2012.

== In Memoriam ==
Broadway actors Justin Guarini, Kevin Smith Kirkwood, Okieriete Onaodowan, David Abeles, and Chuck Cooper performed Boyz II Men's "It's So Hard to Say Goodbye to Yesterday" as images of theatre personalities who died in the past year were shown in the following order.

- Carrie Fisher
- Dick Latessa
- George S. Irving
- Glenne Headly
- Tammy Grimes
- Garry Marshall
- Fyvush Finkel
- Gordon Davidson
- Edward Albee
- Willa Kim
- Seth Gelblum
- Sheila Bond
- Cecilia Hart
- James Houghton
- Martha Lavey
- William M. Hoffman
- Zelda Fichandler
- Irene Bunis
- Laurie Carlos
- Jack Hofsiss
- Mary Tyler Moore
- Martha Swope
- Debbie Reynolds
- John McMartin
- Gene Wilder
- Florence Henderson
- Michael Gardner
- Karen Walsh
- Alec McCowen
- Elliot Martin
- William David Brohn
- Edwin Sherin
- Fritz Weaver
- Rick Steiner
- James M. Nederlander

== See also ==
- Drama Desk Awards
- 2017 Laurence Olivier Awards – equivalent awards for West End theatre productions
- Obie Award
- New York Drama Critics' Circle
- Theatre World Award
- Lucille Lortel Awards
