= Tore Hattrem =

Norwegian diplomat and politician

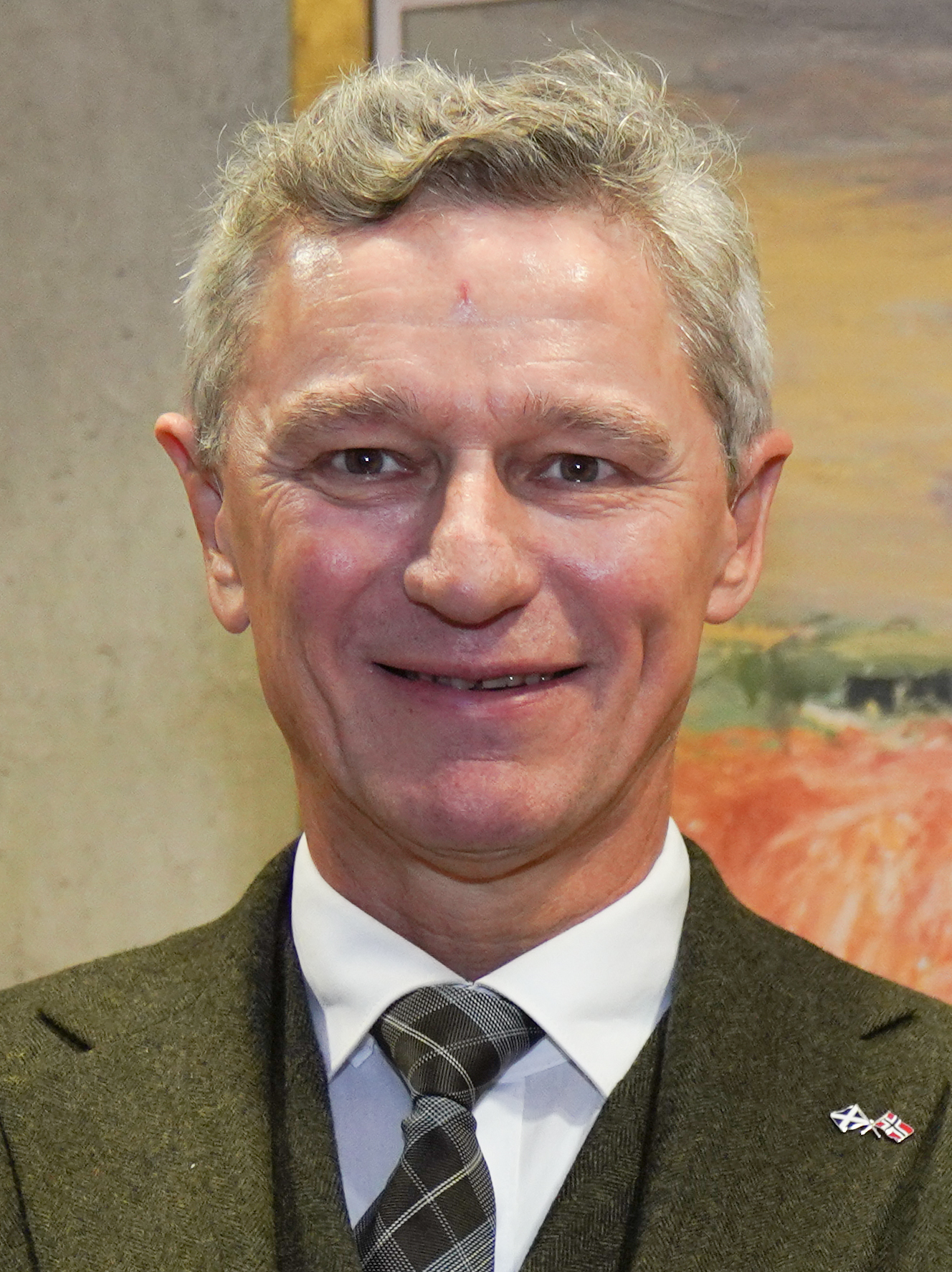
- Tore Hattrem in 2024

Norway Ambassador to the United Kingdom
- Incumbent
- Assumed office August 2023
- Prime Minister: Jonas Gahr Støre
- Preceded by: Wegger Christian Strømmen

Permanent Under-Secretary of State of the Ministry of Foreign Affairs
- In office 2018–2023
- Prime Minister: Erna Solberg; Jonas Gahr Støre
- Preceded by: Wegger Christian Strømmen
- Succeeded by: Torgeir Larsen

Norwegian Permanent representative to the United Nations
- In office 2017–2018
- Prime Minister: Erna Solberg
- Preceded by: Geir Otto Pedersen
- Succeeded by: Mona Juul

State Secretary of the Ministry of Foreign Affairs
- In office 18 December 2015 – 23 September 2016
- Prime Minister: Erna Solberg
- Preceded by: Laila Bokhari
- Succeeded by: Marit Berger Røsland

Norway Ambassador to Afghanistan
- In office 2010–2012
- Prime Minister: Jens Stoltenberg

Personal details
- Born: 23 August 1962 (age 64)
- Party: Conservative
- Spouse: Marit Gjelten
- Children: 3
- Education: University of Oslo
- Occupation: Diplomat

Tore Hattrem (born 23 August 1962) is a Norwegian diplomat and politician for the Conservative Party. In 2018 he was appointed as the Permanent Under-Secretary of State of the Ministry of Foreign Affairs, the top civil servant in the ministry. He formerly served as State Secretary and as Permanent Representative of Norway to the United Nations in New York, and was President of the UNICEF Executive Board in 2018. Since 2023, Hattrem has been Norway’s Ambassador to the United Kingdom.

== Biography ==
Tore Hattrem holds a master's degree in Political Science from the University of Oslo, and graduated from the Norwegian Officer Candidate School in 1982.

From 1994 to 1997, he was Second Secretary at the Norwegian Embassy in New Delhi. In 1997, he became the First Secretary at the Permanent Mission of Norway to the UN and the WTO in Geneva, and then Adviser in the United Nations Security Council from 2000 to 2002. In 2002, he became Deputy Director General and Head of the Section for Peace and Reconciliation. In 2007, he became the Norwegian Ambassador to Sri Lanka. During this tenure, he acted as a facilitator to solve the LTTE-driven crisis. From 2010 to 2012, he was the Ambassador to Afghanistan.

Tore Hattrem was formerly Ambassador of Norway to Sri Lanka, Sudan and Afghanistan, and Director-General in the Ministry of Foreign Affairs.

Hattrem served as State Secretary in the Ministry of Foreign Affairs from 2015 to 2016 and as the Permanent Representative of Norway to the United Nations in New York from 2017 to 2018. During his tenure as Permanent Representative he was elected President of the UNICEF Executive Board for the term 2018, the second Norwegian after Torild Skard to hold that office.

In 2018 he was appointed as the Permanent Under-Secretary of State of the Ministry of Foreign Affairs, the ministry's top civil servant.

== Personal life ==
Tore Hattrem is married to Marit Gjelten. They have 3 children.

Diplomatic posts
Preceded by Geir Otto Pedersen	Norwegian Permanent Representative to the United Nations; 2017–2018	Succeeded by Mona Juul
Civic offices
Preceded by Wegger Christian Strømmen	Permanent under-secretary of state in the Ministry of Foreign Affairs; 2018–2023	Succeeded by Torgeir Larsen
