= Bartlett Sher =

American theatre director (born 1959)

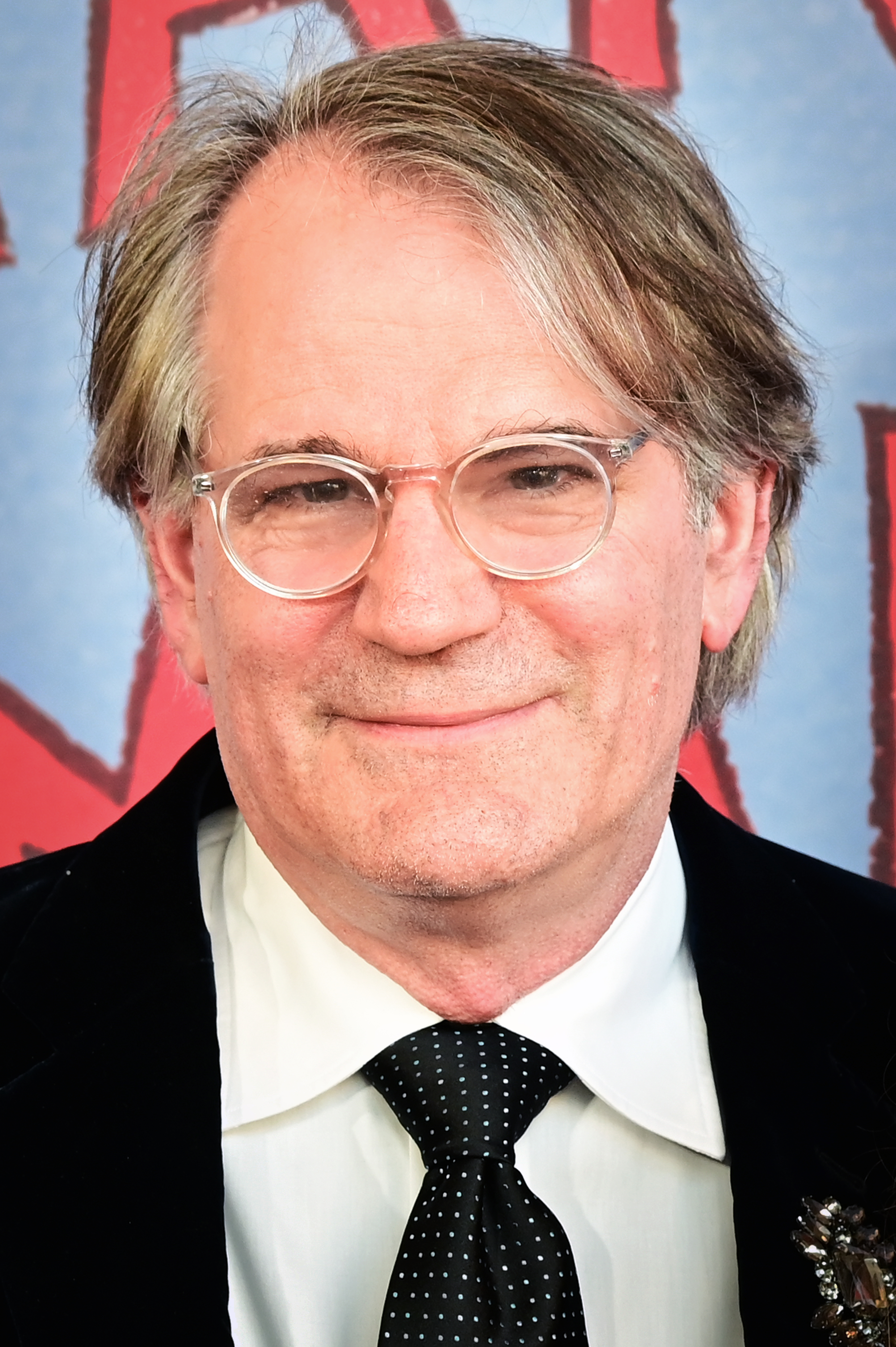
- Sher in 2026
- Born: March 27, 1959 (age 67); San Francisco, California, U.S.
- Education: College of the Holy Cross (BA)
- Occupation: Theatre director
- Spouse: Kristin Flanders
- Children: 2

Bartlett Sher (born March 27, 1959) is an American theatre director. He was described by The New York Times as "one of the most original and exciting directors, not only in the American theater but also in the international world of opera". Sher has been nominated for nine Tony Awards, winning a Tony Award for Best Direction of a Musical for the 2008 Broadway revival of South Pacific.

Sher has directed revivals of classic mid-century musicals on Broadway at Lincoln Center, which include South Pacific (2008), The King and I (2015), My Fair Lady (2018), and Camelot (2023). He also directed the plays Oslo (2017), To Kill a Mockingbird (2018), and Pictures from Home (2023).

== Early life and education ==
Sher was born in San Francisco, California, the son of Aird Stewart and Joseph Sher. He had six siblings, including a twin brother, Bradley. He was raised Catholic. As a teenager, he discovered that his father, who was born in Lithuania, was Jewish.

After attending St. Ignatius College Preparatory, Sher graduated from the College of the Holy Cross in Worcester, Massachusetts, with a Bachelor of Arts in English literature in 1981. As an undergraduate at Holy Cross, he produced and wrote his first full-length play. After college, he returned to St. Ignatius to teach English and run the theatre program. During the 1984 Los Angeles Olympic Games he was influenced by the arts programs associated with the Games, particularly by the work of Polish director Tadeusz Kantor.

== Career ==
Sher served as associate artistic director at Hartford Stage (Hartford, Connecticut) and company director at the Guthrie Theater (Minneapolis, Minnesota) where he worked with Garland Wright, who was a mentor as was Robert Woodruff. Sher has directed, taught and led workshops across the country and internationally. He was artistic director at Intiman Theatre in Seattle and in 2008 was named resident director at Lincoln Center Theater in New York City.

=== Intiman Playhouse, Seattle ===
Sher served as artistic director at Intiman Playhouse in Seattle from 2000 to 2010. During 2010 Sher handed over this job to his successor, Kate Whoriskey. (The Intiman cancelled its 2011 season due to financial problems.) His productions at Intiman have included:

- Nickel and Dimed, a world premiere by Joan Holden based on the book by Barbara Ehrenreich;
- Tony Kushner's Homebody/Kabul (British housewife becomes fascinated with Afghanistan);
- Ingmar Bergman's Nora (adaptation of Henrik Ibsen's A Doll's House );
- G. B. Shaw's Arms and the Man;
- Shakespeare's Cymbeline and Titus Andronicus;
- Carlo Goldoni's The Servant of Two Masters;
- Works by Craig Lucas:

The Dying Gaul (a funny and tragic story of a grieving Hollywood scriptwriter)
The Singing Forest (neurotics and therapists sparring) — world premiere
Prayer for My Enemy (dysfunctional family, friendship, war in Iraq)
The Light in the Piazza, book by Lucas (a chance meeting in Florence leads to romance)

=== Other theatre and opera ===
At the Theatre for a New Audience (TFANA) in New York, Sher directed productions of Waste by Harley Granville Barker in 2000 (its American premiere, winning the 2000 Obie Award for Best Play), Cymbeline by Shakespeare in 2002, Dom Juan by Molière in 2003, and Pericles, Prince of Tyre by Shakespeare in 2004. He directed Cymbeline, Dom Juan, and Pericles at the Brooklyn Academy of Music. In 2006 Sher directed Gioachino Rossini's Il barbiere di Siviglia (The Barber of Seville) at the Metropolitan Opera in Lincoln Center. In 2009 Sher directed the opera Tales of Hoffmann at the Metropolitan Opera in New York (opening December 3, 2009). In 2011, Sher directed Mourning Becomes Electra for Seattle Opera. In March 2011, Le Comte Ory by Rossini opened at the Metropolitan Opera in New York, in a production directed by Sher. The reviewer for The New York Times called the production "lively, colorful and inventive." In June 2011, Sher's production of the world premiere of Nico Muhly's Two Boys was presented at the English National Opera. The American debut took place in October 2013, at the Metropolitan Opera in New York. The Met commissioned the production. Sher directed a London revival of Kiss Me Kate at the Barbican Theatre for a run lasting from June through September 2024.

=== Broadway and Lincoln Center ===
Sher made his Broadway debut in 2005 when his production of The Light in the Piazza which had originated at the Intiman Playhouse premiered at the Vivian Beaumont Theatre. Sher received Tony Award nominations for The Light in the Piazza and a 2006 revival of Awake and Sing!, winning the Tony Award for Best Direction of a Musical for the 2008 Broadway revival of South Pacific. He received another Tony nomination for the 2009 revival of Joe Turner's Come and Gone. In 2010 Sher directed a musical production of Women on the Verge of a Nervous Breakdown based on the 1988 film by Pedro Almodóvar. The show opened November 4, 2010 on Broadway in a Lincoln Center Theater production. The musical was criticized by Ben Brantley of The New York Times as being distracted, gimmicky and overdesigned. A previously announced revival of Funny Girl that Sher was expected to direct with a Broadway opening in February 2012 was ultimately postponed.

In December 2012, Golden Boy by Clifford Odets as directed by Sher opened in New York to a positive review in The New York Times. This production was staged at the Belasco Theatre, the same spot where Golden Boy was first presented on Broadway, 75 years earlier. The production received eight Tony Award nominations, including Sher's fifth for directing. Sher had directed Odets' Awake and Sing! in 2006. The production ran from December 2012 into January 2013 for 53 performances. In 2014 Sher directed a musical production of the novel The Bridges of Madison County. The production ran for 100 performances from February to May 2014.

Sher directed a Broadway revival of The King and I, which opened at the Vivian Beaumont Theatre at Lincoln Center on April 16, 2015, with Kelli O'Hara as Anna Leonowens, Ken Watanabe as The King of Siam, and Ruthie Anne Miles as Lady Tiang. He received a 2015 Tony Award nomination for Best Direction of a Musical, and the production received Tony Awards for Best Revival of a Musical, Best Actress in a Musical (O'Hara), Best Featured Actress in a Musical (Miles) and Best Costume Design of a Musical (Catherine Zuber). He reproduced the musical when it transferred to the West End's London Palladium in 2018. Sher directed a Broadway revival of Fiddler on the Roof, starring Danny Burstein as Tevye and Jessica Hecht as Golde, which opened at the Broadway Theatre on December 17, 2015 and played its final performance on December 31, 2016.

Sher directed the world premiere of J.T. Roger's play Oslo which opened at the Mitzi Newhouse Theater in July 2016. The production transferred to the Vivian Beaumont Theater for an open run in April 2017. Sher directed the 2021 television film adaptation of Oslo. Sher received Tony Award nominations for Oslo, a 2018 revival of My Fair Lady, and the 2018 play adaptation of To Kill a Mockingbird. In 2023, it was announced that he would direct the stage musical adaptation of Damien Chazelle's 2016 film La La Land. In September 2024, Lincoln Center Theatre appointed Sher as its executive producer.

== Personal life ==
Sher lives in Manhattan with his wife Kristin Flanders (a Yale trained actress) and two daughters. His father, an insurance broker whom he described to The New York Times as a "brilliant businessman, very charismatic", was also a serial philanderer who had a second family with another woman. Sher's childhood was marked by a drawn-out divorce. His mother soon met a Chinese-American man, Doug Chung, who moved in, helped rear the family and brought them much needed stability. Sher's experiences with interracial blended families informed his directing of South Pacific.

== Directing credits ==
=== Broadway ===
Year	Title	Venue
2005	The Light in the Piazza	Vivian Beaumont Theatre
2006	Awake and Sing!	Belasco Theatre
2008	South Pacific	Vivian Beaumont Theatre
2009	Joe Turner's Come and Gone	Belasco Theatre
2010	Women on the Verge of a Nervous Breakdown	Belasco Theatre
2012	Golden Boy	Belasco Theatre
2014	The Bridges of Madison County	Gerald Schoenfeld Theatre
2015	The King and I	Vivian Beaumont Theatre
2015	Fiddler on the Roof	Broadway Theatre
2017	Oslo	Vivian Beaumont Theatre
2018	My Fair Lady	Vivian Beaumont Theatre
2018	To Kill a Mockingbird	Shubert Theatre
2023	Pictures from Home	Studio 54
2023	Camelot	Vivian Beaumont Theatre
2024	McNeal	Vivian Beaumont Theatre
2026	Man of La Mancha	Vivian Beaumont Theatre

=== West End ===
Year	Title	Venue
2015	Women on the Verge of a Nervous Breakdown	Playhouse Theatre
2024	Kiss Me, Kate	Barbican Centre

=== Film ===
Year	Title	Notes
2021	Oslo	Television film

== Awards and honors ==
Year	Association	Category	Work	Result	Ref.
2002	Drama Desk Award	Outstanding Director of a Play	Cymbeline	Nominated	
2002	Joe A. Callaway Award		Cymbeline	Won	
2004	Joseph Jefferson Award	Director of a Musical	The Light in the Piazza	Nominated	
2005	Tony Award	Best Direction of a Musical	The Light in the Piazza	Nominated	
2005	Drama Desk Award	Outstanding Director of a Musical	The Light in the Piazza	Nominated	
2005	Outer Critics Circle Award	Outstanding Director of a Musical	The Light in the Piazza	Nominated	
2006	Tony Award	Best Direction of a Play	Awake and Sing!	Nominated	
2006	Outer Critics Circle Award	Outstanding Director of a Play	Awake and Sing!	Nominated	
2008	Tony Award	Best Direction of a Musical	South Pacific	Won	
2008	Drama Desk Award	Outstanding Director of a Musical	South Pacific	Won	
2008	Outer Critics Circle Award	Outstanding Director of a Musical	South Pacific	Won	
2009	Tony Award	Best Direction of a Play	Joe Turner's Come and Gone	Nominated	
2009	Outer Critics Circle Award	Outstanding Director of a Play	Joe Turner's Come and Gone	Nominated	
2013	Tony Award	Best Direction of a Play	Golden Boy	Nominated	
2013	Outer Critics Circle Award	Outstanding Director of a Play	Golden Boy	Nominated	
2014	Drama Desk Award	Outstanding Director of a Musical	The Bridges of Madison County	Nominated	
2015	Tony Award	Best Direction of a Musical	The King and I	Nominated	
2016	Drama Desk Award	Outstanding Director of a Musical	Fiddler on the Roof	Won	
2017	Obie Award	Ensemble Award	Oslo	Won	
2017	Tony Award	Best Direction of a Play	Oslo	Nominated	
2018	Tony Award	Best Direction of a Musical	My Fair Lady	Nominated	
2018	Drama Desk Award	Outstanding Director of a Musical	My Fair Lady	Nominated	
2018	Outer Critics Circle Award	Outstanding Director of a Musical	My Fair Lady	Won	
2019	Tony Award	Best Direction of a Play	To Kill a Mockingbird	Nominated	
2019	Outer Critics Circle Award	Outstanding Director of a Play	To Kill a Mockingbird	Nominated	
2022	Drama Desk Award	Outstanding Director of a Musical	Intimate Apparel	Nominated	

== Other recognition ==
In 2017, Sher received the Golden Plate Award of the American Academy of Achievement presented by Awards Council member Jeremy Irons.

In 2017, The New York Pops celebrated its 34th birthday with a gala honoring Sher and Kelli O'Hara.

== See also ==
- Tony Award for Best Direction of a Play — 2006 nomination (Awake and Sing!), 2009 nomination (Joe Turner's Come and Gone), 2013 nomination (Golden Boy), 2017 nomination (Oslo), and 2019 nomination (To Kill a Mockingbird)
- Tony Award for Best Direction of a Musical — 2005 nomination (The Light in the Piazza), 2008 winner (South Pacific), 2015 nomination (The King and I), and 2018 nomination (My Fair Lady)
