= Yair Hirschfeld =

Israeli academic

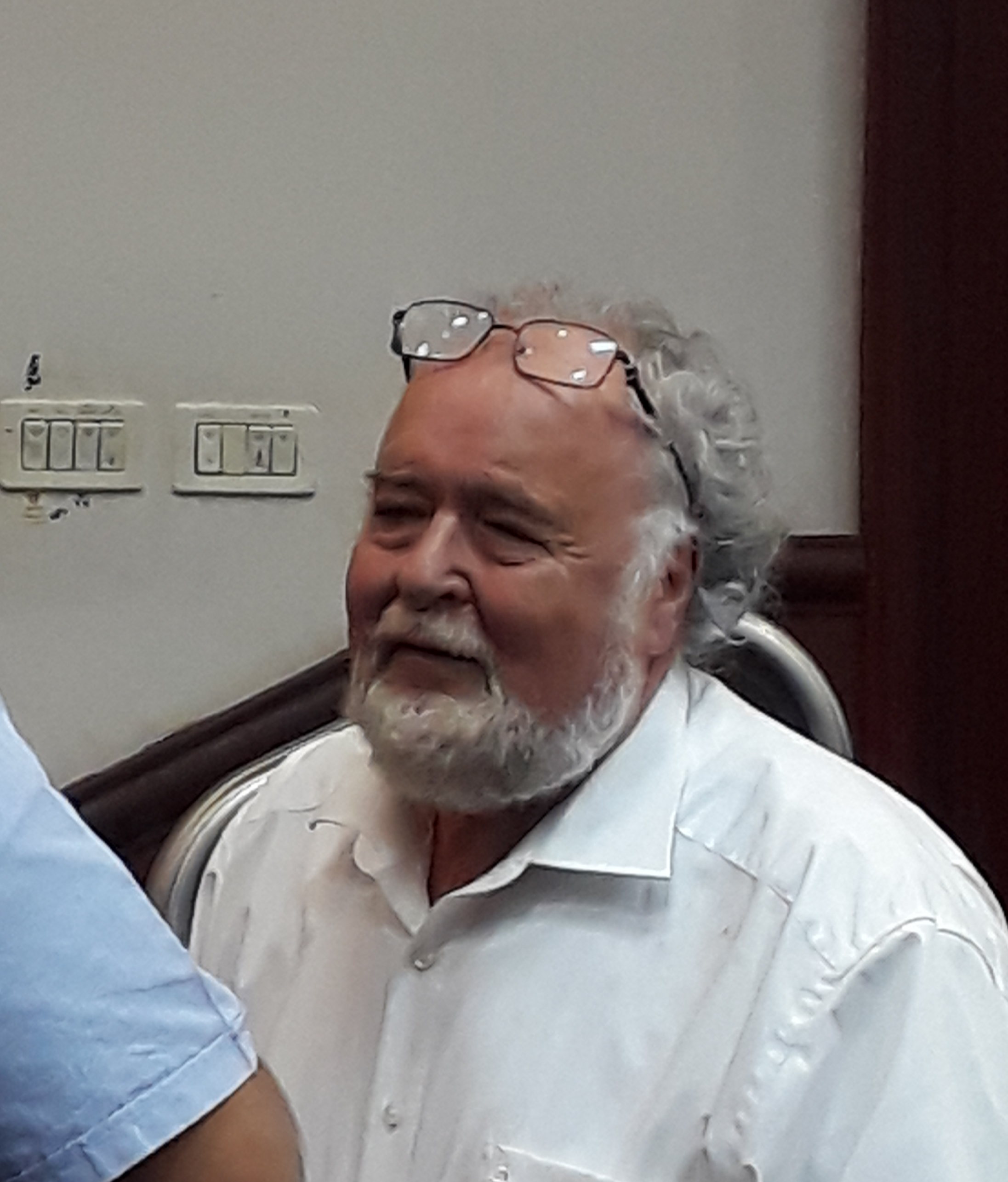
Hirschfeld in 2018

Yair Hirschfeld (Hebrew: יאיר הירשפלד)is an Israeli historian and peace negotiator who taught Middle Eastern history at the University of Haifa. Together with Ron Pundak, he led the unofficial Israeli side of the secret 1993 back-channel talks with representatives of the Palestine Liberation Organization in Norway that produced the draft framework for the Declaration of Principles, the first of the Oslo Accords; historians and reviewers have described him as one of the architects of the Oslo process. He co-founded the Economic Cooperation Foundation (ECF), a Tel Aviv-based non-governmental organization active in Israeli–Palestinian track-two diplomacy, and is the author of Track-Two Diplomacy toward an Israeli-Palestinian Solution, 1978-2014 (2014) and The Israeli–Palestinian Peace Process: A Personal Insider's Account (2024).

== Early life and education ==
Hirschfeld was born in 1944 in Wellington, New Zealand, and grew up in Vienna, Austria. He completed his Ph.D. summa cum laude at Tel Aviv University in 1976 with a dissertation on "German-Iranian Relations 1921–1941", and subsequently served as head of the Iran Desk at the Dayan Center. His doctoral research on German–Iranian relations under Reza Shah was published in German as Deutschland und Iran im Spielfeld der Mächte (1980) in a series of the Institute for German History at Tel Aviv University.

== Career ==
=== Academic work ===
Hirschfeld was a senior lecturer in the Department of Middle Eastern History at the University of Haifa. From January to May 2012 he was a Public Policy Scholar at the Wilson Center in Washington, D.C., and he has also been associated with the Baker Institute for Public Policy at Rice University and with the S. Daniel Abraham Center for Strategic Dialogue at Netanya Academic College.

=== Early peace initiatives, 1979–1992 ===
Hirschfeld has said that his involvement in Israeli–Palestinian dialogue began in February 1979, when the Austrian chancellor Bruno Kreisky, whom he met after speaking on Austrian television about Iran, asked him to take part in such contacts. A proposal he prepared was conveyed to the Crown Prince of Jordan, and a written response reached him in October 1980, which he took to Yossi Beilin and Shimon Peres. A reviewer of his 2014 book noted that the collaboration with Kreisky was promising at first but later became confrontational. According to Hirschfeld, he subsequently arranged confidential meetings between Palestinian figures in the West Bank and Gaza and Peres, Beilin and other members of the Israeli Labor Party.

In Benny Morris's account, Hanan Ashrawi and Hirschfeld began maintaining back channels to the PLO's Faisal Husseini in 1989. Hirschfeld's 2014 book describes a multitrack effort in 1989–91 that preceded the Madrid Conference of 1991. In 1990 he founded the Economic Cooperation Foundation with Beilin and Boaz Karni.

=== Oslo back channel, 1992–1993 ===
In late 1992, Beilin, then Israel's deputy foreign minister, asked Hirschfeld to meet Ahmed Qurei (Abu Ala), the PLO's finance chief, in London. The meeting, in early December 1992, was arranged through Norwegian intermediaries including the social scientist Terje Rød-Larsen. Israeli law at the time prohibited contacts with the PLO, and the initial Israeli participation in the channel was unofficial; the Knesset repealed the prohibition in January 1993.

In May 1993, Peres directed Uri Savir, director-general of the Foreign Ministry, and its legal adviser Joel Singer to join Hirschfeld and Pundak in Oslo, turning the channel into an official one. Hirschfeld and Pundak then took a reduced role as Savir led the negotiations. The text was concluded in the early hours of 20 August 1993, with both academics present and the Declaration of Principles was signed at the White House on 13 September 1993. Shlaim wrote that the participation of Hirschfeld and Pundak was critical to the success of the channel, and reported that Savir credited their distance from conventional diplomacy as a factor.

=== Later track-two work, 1993–2014 ===
After the signing of the Declaration of Principles, Hirschfeld continued track-two work through the ECF. He has said the foundation prepared concept papers on an Israeli–Palestinian code of conduct, economic empowerment, security arrangements and people-to-people cooperation. Between August 1994 and October 1995, alongside Hussein Agha, Ahmad Khalidi, and Ron Pundak, he participated in negotiating the Beilin–Abu Mazen Understanding, an early joint outline of a permanent-status agreement between Israel and the Palestinians.

According to Hirschfeld's own account, the ECF took part in Israeli–Palestinian coordination efforts surrounding the 2005 Israeli disengagement from Gaza, and he was later involved in a backchannel that prepared parameters for negotiations between Prime Minister Ehud Olmert and Palestinian President Mahmoud Abbas; those negotiations did not produce an agreement. In 2005 he and Otniel Schneller, a former secretary-general of the Yesha Council, which represents Israeli settlements, published a Hebrew-language book of their dialogues.

=== 2015 to present ===
In 2016 Hirschfeld edited Developing an Israeli Grand Strategy toward a Peaceful Two-State Solution, a collection of policy papers by Israeli security and economic experts published by the Friedrich Ebert Foundation and Netanya Academic College. According to his 2024 memoir, he took part between 2015 and 2020 in a further track-two effort with Palestinian and Israeli participants that produced a nine-point paper in May 2019 and a joint document in June 2020, signed by Abu Ala for the Palestinian side and Schneller for the Israeli side.

After the 7 October 2023 attacks and the start of the Gaza war, Hirschfeld wrote that the ECF's network remained active, with colleagues liaising with Egyptian security officials, the Israeli government and army, and United Nations and United States envoys. In an interview with The Jewish Independent in 2024, he rejected a one-state or confederation outcome, argued for phased separation into two national entities, and criticized the decision to cut funding to UNRWA, saying it would strengthen Hamas. He also advises EcoPeace Middle East, a regional Israeli–Palestinian–Jordanian NGO.

== Views and analysis ==
Hirschfeld has long advocated a two-state solution reached gradually. He has identified five principles for a peace process: gradualism, Palestinian empowerment, effective security, embedding in regional cooperation, and reconciliation. He has argued that Yitzhak Rabin's approach of fighting terror as though there were no peace process, and pursuing peace as though there were no terror, did not put enough pressure on Yasser Arafat to act against Palestinian violence. He has also said that excluding religious actors from the Oslo process was a mistake.

== Reception ==
Reviewing Track-Two Diplomacy toward an Israeli-Palestinian Solution in H-Diplo, Sonja Wentling described it as a painstaking and often personal account that leaves the reader with both optimism and pessimism about the prospects for a permanent-status agreement. A review of his 2024 memoir in ''Bustan: The Middle East Book Review'' characterized it as a blend of memoir and scholarly analysis centered on his role in the Oslo Accords.

== In popular culture ==
Hirschfeld is a character in J. T. Rogers's play Oslo and in its 2021 HBO film adaptation, in which he is portrayed by Dov Glickman. A critic in the ''Jewish Review of Books'' noted that the play differs from the historical record in some details, including its description of Hirschfeld's academic field. The Israel State Archives has published a documentary collection on the secret Oslo negotiations based on his papers.

== Selected publications ==
Year	Title	Publisher / notes
1980	Deutschland und Iran im Spielfeld der Mächte: Internationale Beziehungen unter Reza Schah 1921–1941	Düsseldorf: Droste
2005	Bridge of Paper – Right and Left and in Between (Hebrew; with Otniel Schneller)	Tel Aviv: Maariv
2014	Track-Two Diplomacy toward an Israeli-Palestinian Solution, 1978–2014	Woodrow Wilson Center Press / Johns Hopkins University Press
2016	Developing an Israeli Grand Strategy toward a Peaceful Two-State Solution (editor)	Friedrich Ebert Foundation and Netanya Academic College
2024	The Israeli–Palestinian Peace Process: A Personal Insider's Account	Springer
2024	Guidelines for the Israeli-Palestinian Peace Negotiations (with Raphael Cohen-Almagor)	Palestine-Israel Journal
