= Hilde Waage =

Norwegian historian and peace researcher

Professor Hilde Henriksen Waage
- Education: University of Oslo
- Scientific career
- Fields: History
- Workplaces: Peace Research Institute Oslo

Acting Director of Peace Research Institute Oslo
- In office 1992–1993
- Preceded by: Sverre Lodgaard
- Succeeded by: Dan Smith (British author)

Hilde Henriksen Waage (born 18 August 1959, in Drammen) is a Norwegian historian and peace researcher. She is Professor of History at the University of Oslo and was acting Director of Peace Research Institute Oslo from 1992 to 1993. Waage is an expert on the Israeli–Palestinian conflict and Norway–Israel relations.

== Career ==
Waage took the Cand.philol. degree at the University of Oslo in 1987 and the Dr.philos. degree in 1997, both in history. She became a professor at the University of Oslo in 2007. Before this, Waage worked at the Peace Research Institute Oslo (PRIO), mostly as a researcher but also as acting director (September 1992 – April 1993) and deputy director (1996–2005).

Waage has produced foundational contributions to Norwegian scholarship on Norway's role in the Oslo process of Israeli-Palestinian negotiations during the early to mid-1990s. She has also been critical of the doctoral thesis of former Norwegian State Secretary Jan Egeland, who was intimately involved with the Oslo negotiations, and has used the Oslo process to demonstrate what she calls "the limits of third-party mediation by a small state in highly asymmetrical conflicts," in contradiction to Egeland's thesis.

Part of the Oslo process involved the famous back-channel negotiations, which were mediated by Norway. In 2001, Waage was commissioned by the Norwegian Ministry of Foreign Affairs (MFA) to conduct a comprehensive study of this back channel. In order to carry out the research, she was granted privileged access to all relevant, still-classified files in the ministry’s archives. The MFA had been at the heart of the Oslo process, but when Waage set to work at the archives she was surprised to discover "not a single scrap of paper for the entire period from January to September 1993—precisely the period of the backchannel talks." Such documentation does exist, and has been quoted by Israeli accounts of the Oslo process, but attempts to uncover it have failed, and significant amounts of documentation held by, inter alia, former Foreign Minister Johan Jørgen Holst has been refused access to. Waage and others speculate that such documentation has been kept hidden for party-political reasons, to avoid upsetting Israeli and US sensitivities about Israel's stance during the Oslo process, and for the vested interests of the Norwegian officials involved: Waage describes Norway under the guidance of Terje Rød-Larsen, his wife Mona Juul, Jan Egeland and Johan Jørgen Holst as "Israel's helpful errand boy."

Waage divides her country's role at Oslo into two phases. In the first, "the Norwegians played only the role of a very modest facilitator"; however, during the second, from May 1993 after the Israelis upgraded the status of the Oslo talks:

Norway was . . . also an active mediator. . . . But its mediation role did not involve being on equal terms with each of the involved parties. . . . No evidence has been found showing or even suggesting that the Norwegians argued in the same way towards the Israelis as they did towards the Palestinians. . . . There appears to have been a striking lack of even-handedness on the part of the Norwegians in terms of attempts to persuade the Israeli actors to see the Palestinian point of view or revealing to the PLO where the Palestinians might have had their best negotiating chances. . . . The result achieved in 1993, the Oslo Agreement, was not an ordinary peace agreement. In essence, it was more of a timetable, a point of departure with many vaguely formulated intentions. PLO leader Arafat's willingness to accept the Oslo Accord, with all its shortcomings and compromises, was clearly a result of his fear of being permanently marginalized.

Waage also comments about the real power that Norway had in the meetings. She in the last paragraph of her paper "Postscript to Oslo" says that:

Without the power to impose solutions, and above all dependent on the stronger party, the weak state mediator in unequal contests must rely heavily on “process symmetry,” where the two sides are treated with absolute equality, provided with exactly the same accommodations, allotted exactly the same amount of time to make their case, and so on. The Norwegians went to great lengths to achieve this symmetry (as did the Americans in their mediating efforts between Palestinians and Israelis, albeit for different reasons). The problem with process symmetry is that it cannot address the power asymmetry that inevitably distorts the outcome of negotiations. Process symmetry and the entrie [sic] facilitative exercise can create a sense of equality between adversaries and the illusion of genuine communication, even trust. The Norwegians believed that through dialogue and a gradual building of trust, an irreversible peace dynamic would be created that could push the process forward to solution. The problem with this entire approach is that the issue is not one of trust, but of power. The facilitative process masks that reality. In the end, the results that can be achieved by a weak third-party facilitator are no more than the strong party will allow. Short of unusual generosity or truly far-sighted vision, such a solution can only be unbalanced and unfair, and therefore ultimately unsustainable. The question to be asked is whether such a model can ever be appropriate.

== Critics ==
Waage was criticized both by With Israel for Peace and on Twitter for her moderate approach of how security forces should deal with terrorists.

== Selected bibliography ==
- Heian-Engdal, Marte; Jensehaugen, Jørgen; —— (2013). "Finishing the Enterprise: Israel's Admission to the United Nations". The International History Review. 35 (3): 465–485. doi:10.1080/07075332.2013.795493. S2CID 154883147.
- Jensehaugen, Jørgen; ——; Waage, Hilde Henriksen (2012). "Securing the State: From Zionist Ideology to Israeli Statehood". Diplomacy & Statecraft. 23 (2): 280–303. doi:10.1080/09592296.2012.679478. S2CID 154508041.
- Jensehaugen, Jørgen; —— (2012). "Coercive Diplomacy: Israel, Transjordan and the UN—a Triangular Drama Revisited". British Journal of Middle Eastern Studies. 39 (1): 79–100. doi:10.1080/13530194.2012.659445. S2CID 159890806.
- —— (2008). "Postscript to Oslo: The Mystery of Norway's Missing Files" (PDF). Journal of Palestine Studies. 38 (1): 54–65. doi:10.1525/jps.2008.38.1.54. Archived from the original (PDF) on 2009-03-18.
- —— (2007). "The 'Minnow' and the 'Whale': Norway and the United States in the Peace Process in the Middle East". British Journal of Middle Eastern Studies. 34 (2): 157–176. doi:10.1080/13530190701427917. JSTOR 20455504. S2CID 218602801.
- —— (2005). "Norway's Role in the Middle East Peace Talks: Between a Strong State and a Weak Belligerent" (PDF). Journal of Palestine Studies. 34 (4): 6–24. doi:10.1525/jps.2005.34.4.6. Archived from the original (PDF) on 2010-12-28.
- —— (2005). Regime Stability in the Middle East. Oslo: Peace Research Institute Oslo. ISBN 978-82-7288-226-5.
- —— (2004). Peacemaking is a Risky Business: Norway's Role in the Peace Process in the Middle East, 1993–96. Oslo: Peace Research Institute Oslo. ISBN 978-8-272-88219-7.
- —— (2000). "Norwegians? Who needs Norwegians?" Explaining the Oslo Back Channel: Norway's Political Past in the Middle East (PDF). Oslo: Peace Research Institute Oslo.
- —— (2000). "How Norway Became One of Israel's Best Friends". Journal of Peace Research. 37 (2): 189–211. doi:10.1177/0022343300037002005. JSTOR 424920. S2CID 57146794.
- (1996): Norge -Israels beste venn. Norsk Midtøsten-politikk 1949-1956. Universitetsforlaget. (in Norwegian) (p. 30-45: Yanuv)
