= Oslo (play) =

2016 play by J. T. Rogers

- Original language: English
- Written by: J. T. Rogers
- Subject: Oslo Accords
- Genre: Drama

Premiere
- Date: June 16, 2016
- Place: Mitzi E. Newhouse Theater

Oslo is a play by J. T. Rogers, recounting (in dramatized, partially fictional form) the true-life, previously secret, back-channel negotiations in the development of the pivotal 1990s Oslo Peace Accords between Israel and the Palestine Liberation Organization. The play premiered Off-Broadway in June 2016 and then transferred to Broadway in April 2017.

In May 2017, Oslo won the Lucille Lortel Award for Best Play, the Outer Critics Circle Award for Outstanding New Broadway Play, the 2017 Drama League Award for Outstanding Production of a Play, and two 2017 Obie Awards, one for Best New American Theater Work and the other an Ensemble Award (shared by the director and the entire Off-Broadway cast).

At the 71st Tony Awards, Oslo won the Tony Award for Best Play and Best Featured Actor in a Play award for Michael Aronov. It also won the 2017 Drama Desk Award for Outstanding Play and the 2016-2017 New York Drama Critics' Circle award for Best Play – for a sweep of the 2016-2017 awards season.

== Overview ==
Oslo concerns the true story of the efforts of Mona Juul and her husband, Terje Rød-Larsen, diplomats from Norway who organized breakthrough negotiations between Israeli Prime Minister Yitzhak Rabin and Palestine Liberation Organization Chairman Yasser Arafat in 1993. The play runs for three hours.

== Origins ==
The play originated from a chance connection between playwright J. T. Rogers and Norwegian diplomat Terje Rød-Larsen, through a mutual acquaintance (Rogers' director Bartlett Sher). Through that mutual relationship, Rogers learned of the diplomat's unheralded work developing "back-channel" communications in the 1990s negotiations, and took an interest in developing the story into a play — noting that the story fit his playwriting interests: "stories ... framed against great political rupture ... [about people] who struggle with, and against ... [unfolding] world events — and who are [permanently changed] through that struggle."

== Productions ==
=== Off-Broadway ===
Oslo was first developed at the PlayPenn New Play Conference in Philadelphia, PA. The world premiere production opened on July 11, 2016, at Lincoln Center Theater's Mitzi E. Newhouse Theater following previews from June 16. It was directed by Bartlett Sher.

The production starred Jennifer Ehle and Jefferson Mays. The cast also included Michael Aronov, Anthony Azizi, Adam Dannheisser, Daniel Jenkins, Dariush Kashani, Daniel Oreskes, Henny Russell, Joseph Siravo and T. Ryder Smith.

=== Broadway ===
Oslo transferred to Broadway and opened at the Vivian Beaumont Theater on April 13, 2017. Director Bartlett Sher as well as the entire original Off-Broadway cast reprised their roles in the Broadway production.

Of the new, larger production, Ben Brantley of The New York Times wrote that "J. T. Rogers’s Oslo, an against-the-odds story of international peacemaking, is undeniably a big play, as expansive and ambitious as any in recent Broadway history. So it is particularly gratifying to announce that it has been allowed to stretch to its full height in the thrilling production that opened on Thursday night, directed with a master’s hand by Bartlett Sher." Chris Jones of The Chicago Tribune called Oslo "the best drama I have seen this year anywhere."

=== London ===
The play opened at the Royal National Theatre on 15 September 2017, again directed by Sher, with Toby Stephens, Lydia Leonard, Peter Polycarpou and Philip Arditti as the lead performers, before transferring to the West End's Harold Pinter Theatre from 2 October until 30 December.

=== Tel Aviv ===
The Play opened at the Beit Lessin repertory theater on November 27, 2018, for a limited run of 50 shows.

=== Repertory ===
The play ran at Northern Stage in White River Junction, Vermont September/October 2018.

The play ran at the ACT Theater in Seattle, Washington October/November 2018, directed by John Langs, with Avery Clark and Christine Marie Brown as the lead performers.

The play ran at The Lansburgh Theatre in Washington D.C. from April 24 – May 19, 2019, produced by Round House Theatre. Directed by Ryan Rilette.

The play ran at the Bus Barn Theater by the Los Altos Stage Company in Los Altos, CA, January 23 - February 16, 2020. Directed by Gary Landis.

== Characters and original cast ==
Character	Off Broadway (2016)	Broadway (2017)	Royal National Theatre (2017) & West End (2017)
Mona Juul	Jennifer Ehle	Jennifer Ehle	Lydia Leonard
Terje Rød-Larsen	Jefferson Mays	Jefferson Mays	Toby Stephens
Ahmed Qurei	Anthony Azizi	Anthony Azizi	Peter Polycarpou
Yossi Beilin	Adam Dannheisser	Adam Dannheisser	Jacob Krichefski
Uri Savir	Michael Aronov	Michael Aronov	Philip Arditti
Jan Egeland / Ron Pundak	Daniel Jenkins	Daniel Jenkins	Thomas Arnold
Hassan Asfour	Dariush Kashani	Dariush Kashani	Nabil Elouahabi
Trond Gundersen / German Husband	Jeb Kreager	Jeb Kreager	Anthony Shuster
American Diplomat / Thor Bjornevog	Christopher McHale	Christopher McHale	Daniel Stewart
Yair Hirschfeld / Shimon Peres	Daniel Oreskes	Daniel Oreskes	Paul Herzberg
German Wife / Swedish Hostess	Angela Pierce	Angela Pierce	Karoline Gable
Marianne Heiberg / Toril Grandal	Henny Russell	Henny Russell	Geraldine Alexander
Joel Singer	Joseph Siravo	Joseph Siravo	Jonah Lotan
Johan Jorgen Holst / Finn Grandal	T. Ryder Smith	T. Ryder Smith	Howard Ward

== Awards and nominations ==
=== Original Broadway production ===
Year	Award	Category	Nominee	Result
2017	Tony Award	Best Play		Won
2017	Tony Award	Best Actor in a Play	Jefferson Mays	Nominated
2017	Tony Award	Best Actress in a Play	Jennifer Ehle	Nominated
2017	Tony Award	Best Featured Actor in a Play	Michael Aronov	Won
2017	Tony Award	Best Direction of a Play	Bartlett Sher	Nominated
2017	Tony Award	Best Scenic Design of a Play	Michael Yeargan	Nominated
2017	Tony Award	Best Lighting Design of a Play	Donald Holder	Nominated
2017	Drama Desk Award	Outstanding Play		Won
2017	Drama Desk Award	Outstanding Featured Actor in a Play	Michael Aronov	Nominated
2017	Drama League Award	Outstanding Production of a Broadway or Off-Broadway Play		Won
2017	Drama League Award	Distinguished Performance	Jennifer Ehle	Nominated
2017	Drama League Award	Distinguished Performance	Jefferson Mays	Nominated
2017	New York Drama Critics’ Circle Award	Best Play	J. T. Rogers	Won
2017	Outer Critics Circle Award	Outstanding New Broadway Play		Won
2017	Outer Critics Circle Award	Outstanding Featured Actor in a Play	Michael Aronov	Nominated
2017	Outer Critics Circle Award	Outstanding Projection Design	Benjamin Pearcy for 59 Productions	Nominated
2017	Lucille Lortel Award	Outstanding Play		Won
2017	Lucille Lortel Award	Outstanding Lead Actress in a Play	Jennifer Ehle	Won
2017	Lucille Lortel Award	Outstanding Featured Actor in a Play	Michael Aronov	Won
2017	Lucille Lortel Award	Outstanding Director	Bartlett Sher	Won
2017	Obie Award	Best New American Theatre Work	J. T. Rogers	Won
2017	Obie Award	Ensemble	Bartlett Sher, Jefferson Mays, Henny Russell, T. Ryder Smith, Jennifer Ehle, Adam Dannheisser, Anthony Azizi, Daniel Oreskes, Daniel Jenkins, Dariush Kashani, Christopher McHale, Michael Aronov, Jeb Kreager, Joseph Siravo and Angela Pierce	Won

=== Original West End production ===
Year	Award	Category	Nominee	Result
2017	Evening Standard Theatre Award	Best Play	J. T. Rogers	Nominated
2018	Laurence Olivier Award	Best New Play		Nominated
2018	Laurence Olivier Award	Best Actor in a Supporting Role	Peter Polycarpou	Nominated

== Film adaptation ==
On November 9, 2020, it was announced that production had commenced on the film version of Oslo, written for the screen by J. T. Rogers and directed by Bartlett Sher, who also directed the Broadway production. Ruth Wilson and Andrew Scott lead the cast. The film premiered on HBO in May 2021.

The film was executive produced by Marc Platt, whose credits include Bridge of Spies, La La Land, and Wicked, as well as by J.T. Rogers, Bartlett Sher, Kristie Macosko Krieger (The Post), Cambra Overend, and Steven Spielberg.

Rogers indicated, in a television interview, that the motion picture might include some details of the story omitted from the play.
