= International Peace Institute =

US-based think tank

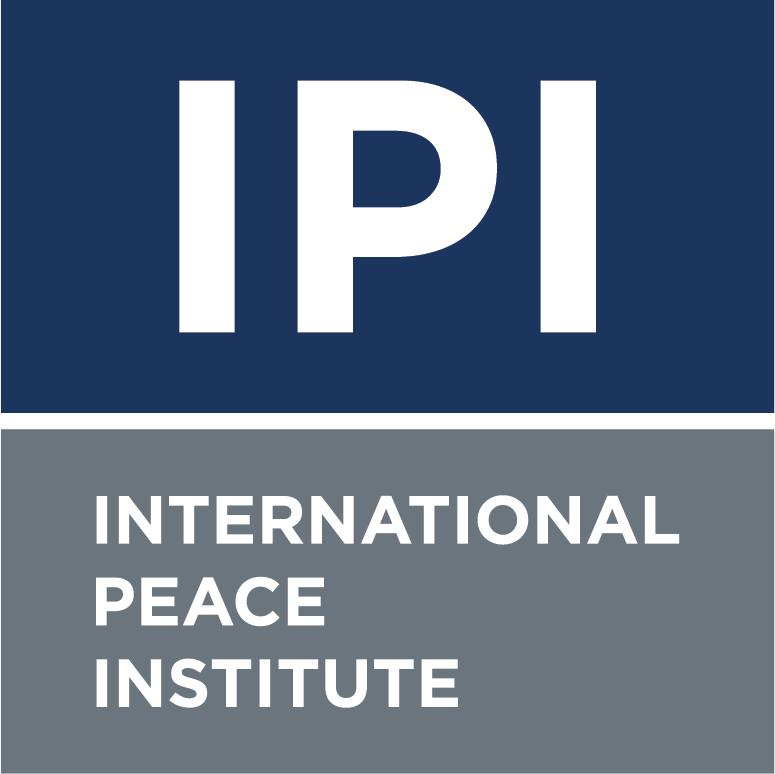
- Abbreviation: IPI
- Predecessor: International Peace Academy (IPA)
- Formation: 1970
- Founder: Ruth Forbes Young, Major General Indar Jit Rikhye
- Type: International non-governmental organization
- Purpose: "Advancing Multilateral Solutions for a Peaceful Planet"
- President and CEO: Zeid Ra’ad Al Hussein
- Chair of the Board of Directors: Jean Todt
- Website: https://www.ipinst.org/

The International Peace Institute (IPI), formerly the International Peace Academy, is an independent non-profit think tank, which was founded in 1970, based in New York. The institute previously had a regional office in the Middle East (Manama, Bahrain) and a regional office in Europe (Vienna, Austria).

IPI specializes in multilateral approaches to peace and security issues, working closely with the United Nations system and its member states. Areas of focus include peace operations; peace, climate, and sustainable development; women, peace, and security; and human rights and humanitarian affairs. IPI states that it produces "evidence-based analysis and practical policy recommendations to inform debate and guide decision making on complex and emerging issues"; that it "engages policy- and decision-makers from the United Nations System, member states, regional organizations, civil society, and the private sector through candid discussion"; and that it "provides innovative and strategic advice on multilateral processes to these partners to help them develop and implement achievable and sustainable solutions." As of May 2024, IPI has a staff of approximately 38. Since March 2021, Zeid bin Ra'ad Al Hussein has been the president and CEO of IPI.

== History ==
The International Peace Institute was created with support from UN Secretary-General U Thant in 1970, originally with the purpose of studying UN peacekeeping and developing peacekeeping doctrine, with strong financial backing from Ruth Forbes Paine Young. Its first President was Maj. Gen. Indar Jit Rikhye, Indian commanding officer of UN peacekeeping forces and a former military advisor to the UN Secretary-General. Under his tenure, IPI initiated an innovative program aimed at training civilians and military officers together for the challenges of preventing conflict and building peace. In 1990, under Olara Otunnu, a Ugandan diplomat and politician, IPI branched out into the political dimensions of war and peace. During this time, IPI became known for its case studies of UN field operations and for its forward-looking analysis on new roles for the UN in the security sphere. Otunnu also initiated IPI's Africa Program, currently its longest-running program. David M. Malone, a Canadian scholar-diplomat, took over as President in 1998, followed by Terje Rød-Larsen, from 2005 to 2020, a Norwegian sociologist and diplomat who has served the UN as its senior envoy in the Middle East, and a principal architect of the 1990s Oslo Peace Accords. IPI today focuses its work on multilateral cooperation, peace operations, climate change and sustainable development, women, peace, and security, human rights and humanitarian affairs.

=== Terje Rød-Larsen ===
The organization's former president Terje Rød-Larsen had close ties to Jeffrey Epstein, leading to his forced resignation in 2020. IPI's board characterized Rød-Larsen relationship with Epstein "repugnant to the institution's core values". It commissioned an audit from KPMG, as well as other reviews and policy overhauls.

Norwegian authorities alerted US Epstein investigators in 2019 after reports that Rød-Larsen brought in young, unqualified women from Eastern Europe on very short internships whose photos were then taken in front of the UN building and shared with Epstein Investigation of these reports did not result in any publicly-disclosed criminal inquiries to individuals beyond Rød-Larsen and his wife, Norwegian diplomat Mona Juul. The lawyer for one woman “confirmed to the newspaper that she is one of Epstein's victims, but emphasizes that IPI is not connected to the abuse.” Further investigation by Verdens Gang and other media sources established that the tip shared in 2019 had been mischaracterized and referred to two specific cases, in which the lawyer for both victims stated, "Neither Terje Rød-Larsen nor IPI as an institution was involved in the sexual abuse or exploitation of Epstein's victims."

Rød-Larsen described Epstein as "my best friend" and "a thoroughly good human being." Rød-Larsen, his wife Mona Juul and their children are accused of receiving personal substantial gifts from Epstein. In his will Epstein left 10 million US dollars to Rød-Larsen's children. Epstein also named Rød-Larsen the executor of his estate in a previous will.

Rød-Larsen has worked to bolster contact between the MAGA movement and the European far right, despite previously having been a Labour Party politician in Norway. Aftenposten described him as the central node in Epstein's network in Norway. Morits Skaugen, a since-bankrupt shipowner, said he was forced to sell his large Frogner apartment for half its value to Rød-Larsen and Juul, with Epstein acting as the middle man, stating that the sale was not voluntary and that his family was threatened on Rød-Larsen's and Juul's behalf by Epstein. Epstein showed Skaugen pictures of himself with the chairman of the bank that Skaugen's company had lent money from and a detailed map of all his business connections around the world, and also threatened to fire one of Skaugen's relatives from the International Peace Institute unless Skaugen sold Rød-Larsen the apartment for half its value, stating that "we can't continue with one of your family members working for us." He describes the actions taken by IPI's president with the help of Epstein as "mafia methods".

== Activities ==
=== General ===
The IPI works in Africa, the Middle East, Europe, and Central Asia that involves interacting with international diplomats, dignitaries and scholars (especially from the United Nations) to achieve its goals. These include direct consultation with diplomats and officials, conducting research and publishing reports, convening discussions and presentations, and encouraging and facilitating diplomatic activities of others. The IPI has convened "high-level" discussion panels made up of international diplomats, dignitaries and scholars (especially from the United Nations) to discuss major issues in international affairs affecting international peace and security. The organization publishes a wide range of reports relating to international diplomacy, peacekeeping and humanitarian responses to crisis.

=== Vienna Seminar ===
The International Peace Institute (IPI) Vienna Seminar on Peacemaking and Peacekeeping is an annual event, held in Vienna, Austria since 1970. Over the years it has become a widely recognized forum for discussion of peace and security issues, addressed in a broad sense. It operates with additional support from the Austrian and Viennese governments, and the Diplomatic Academy of Vienna. The event includes presentations by major international diplomats and political officials.

== Funding ==
In 2020, Verdens Gang wrote that IPI has received 130 million Norwegian kroner "through the years" from the Norwegian Foreign Ministry. The Jeffrey Epstein VI Foundation donated $375,000 in 2012. According to the IPI website, the organisation is funded by governments, philanthropic foundations, and individuals. Roughly 70% of annual funds are from government donors, and 22% of our funds are from philanthropic foundations. The remaining funds come from corporate sponsors, individuals, and board members. In the 2020–2021 financial statements, IPI declared US$10,311,911 in assets.

== Leadership ==
- Zeid Ra'ad Al Hussien – IPI President
- Jean Todt – chair of the IPI's Board of Directors; UN Special Envoy for Road Safety, and former president of Federation Internationale de L’Automobile

== Notable individuals ==
- Kevin Rudd – former chair of IPI's board of directors, and the 26th prime minister of Australia from 2007 to 2010 and June to September 2013.
- António Guterres – former honorary chair, Secretary-General of the United Nations.
- Ban Ki-moon – honorary chair and former Secretary-General of the United Nations, stepped down from IPI in 2016.
- Rita Hauser – former chairman of the board of directors, US diplomat to the United Nations for the administration of President Richard Nixon, intelligence advisor to the administrations of Presidents George W. Bush and Barack Obama.
- Terje Rød-Larsen – former president of the foundation (2004–2020), Norwegian diplomat.
- Mortimer Benjamin Zuckerman – former vice chairman, secretary, and treasurer; owner, editor-in-chief and publisher of the New York Daily News newspaper and U.S. News & World Report magazine; chairman-emeritus of Boston Properties, Inc.
- Edward Luck – senior vice president, director of studies and historian, and special adviser to the United Nations Secretary-General.
- Elizabeth M. Cousens –former vice president, chief of staff to the United Nations Mission in Nepal, and policy advisor and counselor to the US Permanent Representative to the United Nations.
- John Hirsch – senior adviser; former US Ambassador to Sierra Leone.
- Warren Hoge – senior adviser for external relations.
- Turki bin Faisal Al Saud – member of International Advisory Council and former Ambassador to the United Kingdom and the United States.
- Youssef Mahmoud – IPI senior adviser; former United Nations Under-Secretary-General.
- Michelle Yeoh – member of IPI's board of directors; actress.
