= They Shall Not Perish =

Film documentary

- Directed by: George Billard
- Written by: George Billard
- Produced by: George Billard
- Starring: Andrea Martin; Tony Shalhoub; Ron Rifkin; Kathleen Chalfant; Dariush Kashani; Michael Aronov; Kara Vedder
- Release date: 2016
- Country: United States

They Shall Not Perish: The Story of Near East Relief is a film about Near East Relief (NER)'s efforts to counter the Armenian genocide. Shant Mardirossian, the chairperson emeritus of the organization, produced it, doing so through the company Acorne Productions. The writer and director is George Billard. Victor Garber serves as the narrator. A slogan on a NER fundraising poster was used for the film's name.

The film was first aired in the Scottish Rite Masonic Museum (previously the National Heritage Museum) in Lexington, Massachusetts (Boston metropolitan area) on October 13, 2017. On January 1, 2018 it was released on Netflix.

== Cast ==
- Andrea Martin as Baidzar Bakalian
- Tony Shalhoub as Karnig Parnian
- Ron Rifkin as Henry Morgenthau
- Kathleen Chalfant as Dr. Mabel Elliott
- Dariush Kashani as George Mardikian
- Michael Aronov as Leslie A. Davis
- Kara Vedder as Nellie Miller Mann
