= Economic Cooperation Foundation =

Israeli think tank

- הקרן לשיתוף פעולה כלכלי
- Formation: 1990; 36 years ago
- Founder: Dr. Yair Hirschfeld, Dr. Yossi Beilin
- Headquarters: Tel-Aviv
- Chairman: Dr. Nimrod Novik
- Leaders: Dr. Yair Hirschfeld, Dr. Yossi Beilin, Mr. Boaz Karni
- Website: www.ecf.org.il

The Economic Cooperation Foundation (ECF, Hebrew: הקרן לשיתוף פעולה כלכלי) was founded by Dr. Yair Hirschfeld (the initiator of the Oslo Peace Process), together with former Minister of Justice, Dr. Yossi Beilin at the end of 1990 as a non-profit, non-governmental track II think tank, whose objectives are to build, maintain and support Israeli-Palestinian and Israeli-Arab cooperation in the political, economic, and civil society spheres in support of creating a sustainable Permanent Status based on a two-state solution. Based in Tel-Aviv, the ECF is led today by Hirschfeld, Beilin and its Treasurer Mr. Boaz Karni. Dr. Nimrod Novik is Chairman of the ECF Executive Board.

Over the years, ECF has developed a unique network of intimate relations with all the relevant players – Israel, Palestine, Egypt, Jordan, America, Europe, and others. In turn, this has enabled the ECF to create coalitions, design concepts, suggest creative solutions and build structures that have been translated into agreed-upon agendas and specific proposals. These, in turn, have offered policy makers, local, regional and international players practical tools, mechanisms, ideas and means to facilitate progress in practical as well as political issues related to the strengthening of the peace process.

ECF's professional input can be found in every initiative for Palestinian-Israeli peace since the inception of the Oslo Process. The ECF initially began and led the secret talks in Oslo, Norway, that resulted in the signing of the Declaration of Principles (DOP) in September 1993. The 'Architects of Oslo', then developed the 'Beilin–Abu Mazen Understanding', the first jointly developed detailed concept of a comprehensive Permanent Status Understanding between Israel and a Palestinian State.

Though not officially affiliated, Dr. Yossi Beilin as well as other members of ECF were central to the drafting of the Geneva Accord, the most detailed proposal for a Permanent Status Accord negotiated by those with close relations to both the Israeli and Palestinian political establishments. ECF also played a noticeable role in preparing for the Israeli Disengagement Plan from Gaza and parts of the northern West Bank in August–September 2005. The best known ECF contribution was in facilitating the successful purchase of the settlers greenhouses, which were then turned over to the Palestinians in order to provide an economic outlet for the struggling Palestinian economy. Despite the destruction of many of these by Arab groups, these greenhouses have provided a critical employment opportunity for nearly 3000 Palestinians, from the 4000 who had previously been employed there, and serve as a first step in the expansion of the Palestinian agricultural export industry, the most viable economic sector for the Palestinians.
