= Sverre Lodgaard =

Norwegian political scientist (born 1945)

- Born: 6 April 1945 (age 81)
- Education: University of Oslo
- Spouse: Karin Marianne Lodgaard
- Scientific career
- Fields: Political science

Director of Peace Research Institute Oslo
- In office 1986–1992
- Preceded by: Marek Thee
- Succeeded by: Hilde Henriksen Waage

Sverre Lodgaard is a Norwegian political scientist who has held several senior positions within government and non-governmental organizations, including the Norwegian Institute of International Affairs (NUPI). Lodgaard specializes in peace, foreign and security policy, but has also worked on developing country issues. He has since the 2000s written extensively on nuclear arms control and disarmament issues and on Middle East affairs.

He graduated from the University of Oslo in 1971; magister degree in political science and supportive degrees in sociology and economics (1971). He conducted research for some years at the Peace Research Institute Oslo (PRIO) and as a fellow at the University of Oslo. From 1980 to 1986 he was director of European Security and Disarmament Studies at the Stockholm International Peace Research Institute (SIPRI), and from 1986 to 1992 returned to PRIO as its director. Lodgaard served as director of United Nations Institute for Disarmament Research (UNIDIR) from 1992 to 1996 and of NUPI from 1997 to 2007. In 2007 he stepped down as director and was succeeded by Jan Egeland, but continued there as senior research fellow. By virtue of his expertise, he has participated in a number of topical TV and radio programs.

Lodgaard has also held senior advisory positions including from 1992–1999 as a member of the UN Secretary-General's Advisory Board on Security and Disarmament, which became United Nations Office for Disarmament Affairs (UNODA). From 1999–2005 he led the Norwegian Labour Party's international committee, and from 2003–2011 was a deputy of the Norwegian Nobel Committee. From 2010–2013 he was president of the Polytechnic Society, and from 2015 to 2018 chairman of the Oslo Center for Peace and Human Rights.

Government offices
Preceded by Olav F. Knudsen	Director of the Norwegian Institute of International Affairs; 1997–2007	Succeeded by Jan Egeland
