= Dariush Kashani =

Iranian-American actor (born 1969)

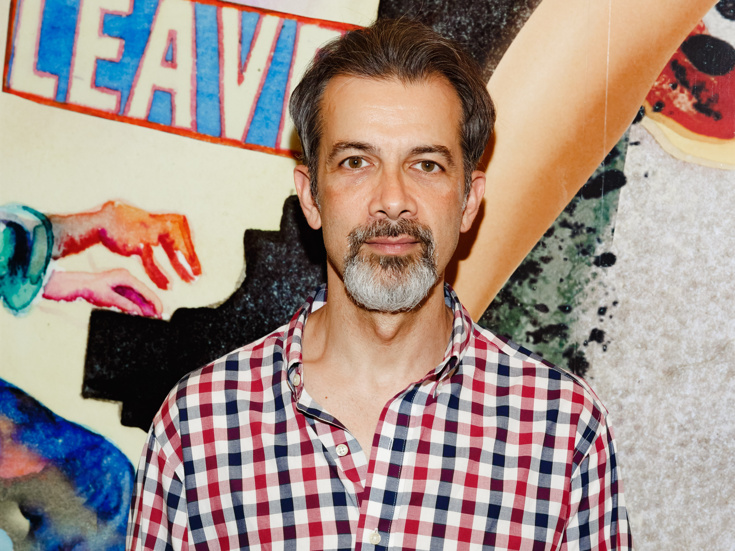
- Kashani in April 2017
- Born: July 2, 1969 (age 57); Tehran, Iran
- Education: George Washington University; Mason Gross School of the Arts
- Occupation: Actor
- Years active: 1998–present

Dariush Kashani is an American film, stage and television actor. Kashani gained critical acclaim for his role as Hassan Asfour in the 2017 Tony Award winning production of the Broadway play Oslo which went on to include a full sweep of the 2016-2017 awards season including the Lucille Lortel Award and the Outer Critics Circle Award for Outstanding New Broadway Play. Kashani also earned an Obie award along with company of Oslo for his work in the Off Broadway production at Lincoln Center. Other stage credits include the Broadway musical The Band's Visit, The Invisible Hand at New York Theatre Workshop and the Tony Kushner play Homebody/Kabul alongside Maggie Gyllenhaal at the Brooklyn Academy of Music. On March 1, 2018, Kashani assumed the lead role in the Broadway musical The Band's Visit. Kashani also appeared in the AMC series Dietland. Other notable works on screen include Bobby Tooch on Ghost Whisperer and Minister Tousi in Madam Secretary.

Kashani will star as Rahim Khan in the upcoming 2022 Broadway premiere of The Kite Runner.

== Early life ==
Kashani was born in Iran and moved to the United States at the age of 9. He attended Bishop Ireton High School in Alexandria, Virginia, starring as the King in The King and I his senior year. Kashani is a classically trained actor who received a MFA in Acting from the Mason Gross School of the Arts at Rutgers University

== Select filmography ==
Year	Title	Role	Notes
2018	Dietland	Clive	4 Episodes
2017	Madam Secretary	Iranian Foreign Minister Tousi	"Snap Back"
2017	They Shall Not Perish: The Story of Near East Relief	George Mardikian	Documentary
2013	Franklin & Bash	Allen Pierce	"Captain Johnny"
2010	NCIS: Los Angeles	Jafar Khan	"Broken Bird"
2006-2009	Ghost Whisperer	Bobby Tooch	8 Episodes
2005	Lost	Haddad	"The Greater Good"
