= Joan Holden =

American playwright (1939–2024)

Joan Holden (January 18, 1939 – January 19, 2024) was an American playwright. For 32 years, she was the resident playwright of the San Francisco Mime Troupe. Holden died from cancer on January 19, 2024, at the age of 85.

== Early life and education ==
Joan Ada Allan was born on January 18, 1939, in Berkeley, California. Her mother, Seema Rynin, was a writer and psychiatric social worker. Her father, William Allen, was an agricultural economist.

She graduated from Berkeley High School in 1956. She received a degree in English from Reed College in 1960.

== Career ==
Holden served as the San Francisco Mime Troupe's principal playwright from 1967 to 2000. She wrote or co-wrote more than 30 plays. Most of her plays focused on her left-leaning politics.

She was head author for the Obie-winning play The Dragon Lady’s Revenge, about the Vietnam War. She won another Obie as one of the authors of Seeing Double, about the Israeli-Palestinian conflict. In 1987, the San Francisco Mime Troupe won the Regional Theatre Tony Award.

== Personal life ==
She married Arthur Holden at age 19 after meeting him when they were both students at Reed College. They divorced, and Holden started a long-term relationship with Dan Chumley. She had three children, Kate, Sophia, and Lily, with Chumley.
