= Mona Juul =

Norwegian diplomat

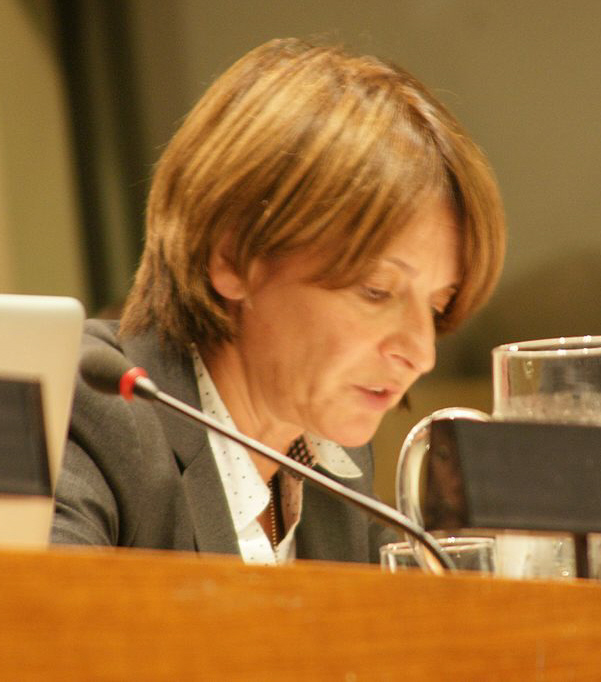
- Juul in 2009

75th President of the United Nations Economic and Social Council
- In office 25 July 2019 – 23 July 2020
- Preceded by: Inga Rhonda King
- Succeeded by: Munir Akram

Permanent Representative of Norway to the United Nations
- In office 14 January 2019 – 1 September 2023
- Prime Minister: Erna Solberg; Jonas Gahr Støre
- Preceded by: Tore Hattrem
- Succeeded by: Merete Fjeld Brattested

Ambassador of Norway to the United Kingdom
- In office 2014–2019
- Prime Minister: Erna Solberg
- Preceded by: Kim Traavik
- Succeeded by: Wegger Chr. Strømmen

Personal details
- Born: 10 April 1959 (age 67) Steinkjer, Nord-Trøndelag, Norway
- Party: Labour
- Spouse: Terje Rød-Larsen (m. 1988)
- Children: 2
- Education: University of Oslo (MA)
- Profession: Diplomat; Politician

Mona Juul (born 10 April 1959) is a Norwegian former diplomat and former politician for the Labour Party.

The Epstein files revealed that she and her husband, the Norwegian politician Terje Rød-Larsen, had a close association with Jeffrey Epstein. On 9 February 2026, Juul was charged by the National Authority for Investigation and Prosecution of Economic and Environmental Crime in Norway (Økokrim) on suspicion of aggravated corruption.

In 2026 she was placed on administrative leave and her security clearance was revoked. Juul resigned as Norway's ambassador to Jordan and Iraq in February 2026.

== Background ==
Juul hails from Sparbu. She holds a degree in political science and attended the trainee program for aspiring diplomats, focusing on international relations, Norwegian interests, and consular work at the Ministry of Foreign Affairs (Norway). She played a key role facilitating the Oslo Accords in the 1990s. Juul worked for the Ministry of Foreign Affairs (Norway) from 1986 to 2025. She was considered one of Norway's most high-profile diplomats for much of her career, prior to the Epstein scandal. When she was appointed Norway's ambassador to Tel Aviv in 2001, she was the youngest female ambassador in the Norwegian Foreign Service, at 41 years old.

== Oslo Accords ==
Along with her husband Terje Rød-Larsen, Juul played a key role in the Oslo Accords, pivotal agreements on Middle East peace negotiated in the 1990s. The secret negotiations, largely arranged and facilitated by Juul and her husband, led to the signing of the first-ever agreement between Israel and the Palestine Liberation Organization (PLO) on 13 September 1993 in Washington D.C.

Juul and the rest of the Oslo team of facilitators focused on the conflict between Israel and the PLO, knowing that a peace agreement would have to be created by the adversaries themselves and that a group acting as mediator would be vital in making appropriate arrangements for negotiations.

When Mona Juul and husband Terje Rød-Larsen received a special award from the Peres Center for Peace in Israel on 11 January 1999, they did not notify the Ministry of Foreign Affairs. The Foreign Ministry reportedly only learned of the 100,000 USD in prize money when the Israeli newspaper Ma'ariv reported on the matter.

The Oslo Accords have been heavily criticised and subject to controversy. Experts argue that the Oslo Accords put Norwegian peace diplomacy on the map, but created an unbalanced process that strengthened Israel's security and occupation, while central Palestinian demands such as refugee rights, the status of Jerusalem, and a freeze on settlements were omitted.

Researcher Hilde Henriksen Waage revealed that documents from nine months of the process, from January to September 1993, were missing from the Foreign Ministry's archives.

The 2016 Broadway play Oslo (play), by noted playwright J. T. Rogers, dramatized the role of Juul and her husband, and others, in developing the back-channel communications that (reportedly) saved the Oslo negotiations from collapsing. Jeffrey Epstein provided funding for a special 2017 New York City performance of the play through Gratitude America LTD, Epstein's "Opaque Charity Account at Deutsche Bank for [his] Own Benefit". The contribution to the play was $250k in two transactions, of a total contribution to IPI of $650k from Epstein controlled charities. (KPMG forensic review of IPI)

An HBO film, Oslo (film) (2021), dramatised the Oslo Accords and the role of Juul and her husband. The film was criticised for reinforcing misconceptions about Norway as a peace nation and what peace negotiations actually are. The film received mixed reviews from Norwegian critics.

== 21st-Century Career ==
During the first Stoltenberg cabinet, from 2000 to 2001, Juul was appointed State Secretary in the Ministry of Foreign Affairs. From 2001 to 2004 she served as the Norwegian ambassador to Israel. From 2005 to 2010, she served as a deputy director and ambassador in the Norwegian delegation to the United Nations in New York City. In 2014, she succeeded Kim Traavik as Ambassador to the United Kingdom.

On 7 September 2018, she was nominated to become the next permanent representative of Norway to the United Nations. She presented her credentials to UN Secretary-General António Guterres on 14 January 2019, and assumed office the same day. As permanent representative, she notably spearheaded the successful Norwegian campaign for a seat at the UN Security Council for the 2021–2022 term. In January 2023, Merete Fjeld Brattested was nominated as her successor. Brattested officially took over on 1 September.

In October 2024, she was nominated as the new ambassador to Jordan. In October 2025, she was additionally appointed ambassador to Iraq.

In February 2026, Mona Juul resigned from her role as ambassador to Jordan and Iraq. She is still employed at the Ministry of Foreign Affairs, but was exempt from her work obligations, following the revelations of her contact with Jeffrey Epstein. This means that she is not at work and has no role or position. She kept her salary of 1,548,000 NOK, but no longer received a foreign allowance since she was no longer stationed at the embassy.

=== Controversies ===
==== Controversies as State Secretary ====
Mona Juul's husband, Terje Rød-Larsen, has had a private archive containing documents from the Oslo Accords that neither the Norwegian public nor the Ministry of Foreign Affairs had access to. Waage started a research project for the Ministry of Foreign Affairs in 1998 that was to contain two parts: How Norway became involved in the Middle East peace process and an evaluation of the Oslo process. Juul personally called Waage and asked her how she could do this (research) without talking to Juul and Terje Rød-Larsen first. In the spring of 2000, Juul called Waage into her office where she told her that in the interest of Norway's role in the peace process in the Middle East, Waage was not allowed to continue her evaluation. Waage stated that she found Juul's conduct as arrogant and condescending.

In 2004, Hilde Henriksen Waage, uncovered that documents from nine months of the process, from January - September 1993, were missing from the archives of the Ministry of Foreign Affairs. Waage had attempted to gain access to the documents for over 20 years as of February 2026. She reported that she was personally called into the office of Mona Juul at the Ministry of Foreign Affairs, where Juul told Waage that her research project had to be stopped "in the interest of Norway's role in the peace process". Waage stated she left the Foreign Ministry angry and in tears.

==== Controversies as Second-in-Command ====
When Mona Juul was second-in-command at the Permanent Mission of Norway to the United Nations in 2008, Juul told a delegation from the Norwegian Parliament that the Norwegian UN ambassador at the time, Morten Wetland, was "useless". Norwegian politician Eirin Faldet, who was part of the delegation, reacted to this statement and told the ambassador.

When Ambassador Morten Wetland was on vacation in 2009, Juul sent a briefing to the Foreign Ministry, where she lambasted UN secretary-general Ban Ki-moon for "lacking leadership abilities", being "spineless" and "a passive observer", and his work being "fruitless". She sent it to 200 people on the Ministry of Foreign Affairs' unclassified network. This made Norway's relationship with the UN secretary-general difficult, according to Morten Wetland. This note by Juul attracted attention when it was leaked to the press. When asked for comment, Ban Ki-moon said he was open to criticism, but admitted that the comments were uncomfortable. The statements made international news and got widespread attention.

==== Controversies as Ambassador ====
Juul's two children were listed in Jeffrey Epstein's will to receive US$5 million each. In February 2026 Juul was released from her job as ambassador, while the Ministry of Foreign Affairs was investigating her connections to Epstein.

The Epstein Files revealed that Mona Juul had used her official Ministry of Foreign Affairs (UD) e-mail to Jeffrey Epstein, social media and streaming services. Her email address was linked, among other things, to a contact where Epstein helps her and her husband, Terje Rød-Larsen, put in a good word for their son - to get him in line for a private school in New York. In an email from 2018, Juul also thanks Epstein for help - apparently in connection with Rød-Larsen having had health problems with a knee. The password to her account was found in a database of leaked login details.

The Epstein files also revealed that Mona Juul had used her diplomatic passport in connection with Epstein's private pilot needing passport information, which may have been a breach of Norwegian foreign service guidelines. On both occasions, she traveled with her husband Terje Rød-Larsen, as well as the couple's children. As a general rule, it the right to have a diplomatic passport ceases in all cases when the position or assignment for which the passport was issued is terminated. After completing service, the holder is obliged to return the passport to the Ministry of Foreign Affairs. This also applies during leave, if the holder permanently resigns from the position, according to rules of the Ministry of Foreign Affairs. When asked of why she had used her diplomatic passport for these travels, Mona Juul commented that she had "no recollection" of using her diplomatic passport in the contexts Norwegian newspaper Aftenposten "asked about".

Mona Juul resigned from her post as ambassador to Iraq and Jordan in February 2026, following the revelations of her contact and involvement with Epstein.

=== Foreign Policy Legacy ===
As of February 2026, Mona Juul was the only professional diplomat in the Ministry of Foreign Affairs (Norway) who was in the Epstein Files spotlight.

Mona Juul is best known for her role in the negotiations that led to the Oslo Accords between Israel and the PLO. This achievement gave her national and international recognition early on.

She held two of Norway's most prestigious ambassadorships (London and the UN in New York). Within the Ministry of Foreign Affairs (UD), she was seen as someone who had reached the very top of the profession.

As a woman rising quickly in a male‑dominated field, she was often pointed to as a positive example of increased female representation in senior diplomatic roles.

Foreign policy expert and political scientist Iver B. Neumann argued that Juul's rapid rise in foreign policy positions was due to a powerful mix of:

- Major national achievement (Oslo Accords)
- Political networks
- Being a capable female diplomat at a time when UD needed more women at the top

Iver B. Neumann believes Mona Juul's fast career progression was largely due to her key role in the Oslo Accords early in her career, which gave her lasting recognition. He also argues that she has not particularly stood out in recent years—neither especially strong nor weak, including in her role as ambassador in London—yet she still became UN ambassador in New York. This has raised questions about what criteria are actually used to fill UD’s most sought‑after ambassador posts.

== Association with Jeffrey Epstein ==
Following the release of additional 3.5 million responsive pages in the Compliance with the Epstein Files Transparency Act by the U.S. Department of Justice in January 2026, Mona Juul and Terje Rød-Larsen were mentioned. The files suggested Jeffrey Epstein had signed 10 million USD to be given to Terje Rød-Larsen and Mona Juul's children in his will, which was signed two days before his death. Mona Juul commented that they were only aware of the information about the will through the media, and that beyond this, the family did not wish to comment on the matter further.

In April 2011, Mona Juul was listed as a passenger with her husband Terje Rød-Larsen and their two children on a planned trip in May 2011 on one of Jeffrey Epstein's private planes, a Beechjet 400.

According to correspondence from the Epstein Files, former prime minister of Israel Ehud Barak suggested in May 2018 that Mona Juul could help with an Israeli intelligence company called Toka. Mona Juul proceeded to send an e-mail with the topic title "Kjell G." to an e-mail address that has been redacted. This mail was forwarded to Jeffrey Epstein by Juul's husband Terje Rød-Larsen.

During the summer of 2018, Juul had bought a luxury apartment in Frogner, Oslo. The apartment was reportedly sold for half of its market value for 14 million NOK. The shipowner Morits Skaugen, who sold the apartment, said that it did not happen voluntarily. The Epstein files showed extensive communication between Epstein and Rød-Larsen about negotiations for the lease and option agreement. In a statement to Norwegian broadcaster NRK, Skaugen stated he experienced significant pressure from Epstein, from whom he has clearly distanced himself, and it had been and still was, deeply burdensome for him personally. Skaugen described the actions taken by Juul and Rød-Larsen with the help of Epstein as "mafia methods."

In October 2020, Terje Rød-Larsen resigned from his position as president of the International Peace Institute (IPI) when it was revealed he had received donations from Epstein through the foundation. In November 2020 it was reported that Epstein had funded a special performance of the Tony-award winning play Oslo for the International Peace Institute. When asked several questions, among others if she knew about Epstein's funding of and presence at the special performance, Juul did not want to comment. In December 2020 she stated that she had no knowledge of any financial relationship between IPI, Epstein and her husband. She referred to what her husband had said to the IPI board, that it was a serious misjudgment to take out a personal loan from Epstein.

In February 2026, Juul finally commented on her communications with Epstein, stating it was inaccurate to describe her contact with him as minimal. She was exempt from her work obligations from her position as ambassador in February 2026 while the Ministry of Foreign Affairs investigated her knowledge of and contact with Epstein. The Ministry of Foreign Affairs investigated whether Juul had complied with the law for government employees.

== Personal life ==
Juul is married to Terje Rød-Larsen and they have a daughter and a son together.

The Epstein Files revealed that their son also had extensive contact with Jeffrey Epstein about his application to New York University (NYU). In over fifty emails, the son is either mentioned or listed as the sender or recipient. Among other things, the contact was about gifts from Epstein. The Epstein files also showed that Jeffrey Epstein attempted to facilitate an internship for Terje Rød-Larsen and Mona Juul's son in 2017. The inquiry was forwarded to the major British bank Standard Chartered and CEO Bill Winters. The request was declined by Winters, who instead asked for a CV that he would forward to HR to be handled professionally. There was correspondence in the Epstein files indicating that an internship was instead offered to the son at the Bank of China's European headquarters in London. Mona Juul's husband Terje Rød-Larsen thanked Jeffrey Epstein for everything he did for his son.

Mona Juul and husband Terje Rød-Larsen are listed as owning several luxury estates. In 2010, Terje Rød-Larsen's former think tank and non-profit organisation, International Peace Institute, bought an apartment on the Upper East Side in New York for 2.2 million USD, registered as Terje Rød-Larsen's address. Mona Juul and Terje Rød-Larsen both own a luxury estate in Paxos, Greece that they bought in 2019, which is described as an "architectural masterpiece", and probably one of the island's most valuable. As a rental object, the estate could be a lucrative source of income for the couple. Based on listing prices, landlords could earn hundreds of thousands a week (NOK) on this object. Terje Rød-Larsen is reported to have also bought additional property on Paxos.

In February 2026, The Norwegian Mapping Authority (Kartverket) announced they would assess whether the document fee (dokumentavgift) for Mona Juul and Terje Rød-Larsen's controversial home purchase in Frogner had been correctly calculated, which would have consequences for the couple's owed document fee. The document fee is a government fee in Norway that arises upon registration of documents that transfer title to real estate. 2.5% of the sales value is paid upon registration of the transfer of title for a freehold home, cottage or plot of land. Mona Juul and Terje Rød-Larsen's lawyers could have given incorrect information to Norwegian authorities in the paperwork, which is estimated to could have saved them 300.000 NOK in document tax upon purchasing the luxury apartment they bought for less money than its market value.

=== Personal network ===
Juul is friends with the Conservative Party Leader (from 2026) and former minister of foreign affairs (2017–2021), Ine Eriksen Søreide. Søreide borrowed Mona Juul and Terje Rød-Larsen's Frogner apartment for her 40th birthday in 2016. Søreide previously called Juul a "close friend" in 2018. Ine Eriksen Søreide held a press conference in February 2026 where she denied that Mona Juul and herself were close friends, stating that they became acquainted in a work context, that they did not have a close relationship and that in recent years, they had little contact.

Norwegian diplomat and former ambassador to Belgium (2015–2019), Ingrid Schulerud, is a close friend and work colleague of Mona Juul, as confirmed by her husband, Minister of Finance (Norway), former Secretary General of NATO (2014–2024) and former Prime Minister of Norway (2000–2001, 2005–2013), Jens Stoltenberg. Stoltenberg, confirmed that he and Schulerud had borrowed the Frogner Apartment of Mona Juul and Terje Rød-Larsen while furnishing their own estate in Oslo and on other occasions while living in Brussels. It was later revealed that Schulerud had vacationed several times on Juul and Terje Rød Larsen's luxury estate in Paxos. Finansavisen reported that this estate is partly financed with funds from Jeffrey Epstein. Stoltenberg has denied that he knew about Terje Rød-Larsen's connection with Jeffrey Epstein during his tenure as prime minister.

Diplomatic posts
Preceded by Svein Ole Sæther	Norwegian Ambassador to Israel; 2001–2004	Succeeded by Hans Jacob Biørn Lian
Preceded by Kim Traavik	Norwegian Ambassador to the United Kingdom; 2014–2018	Succeeded by Wegger Chr. Strømmen
Preceded by Tore Hattrem	Permanent Representative of Norway to the United Nations; 2019–2023	Succeeded by Merete Fjeld Brattested
