= Wegger Christian Strømmen =

Norwegian diplomat and politician (born 1959)

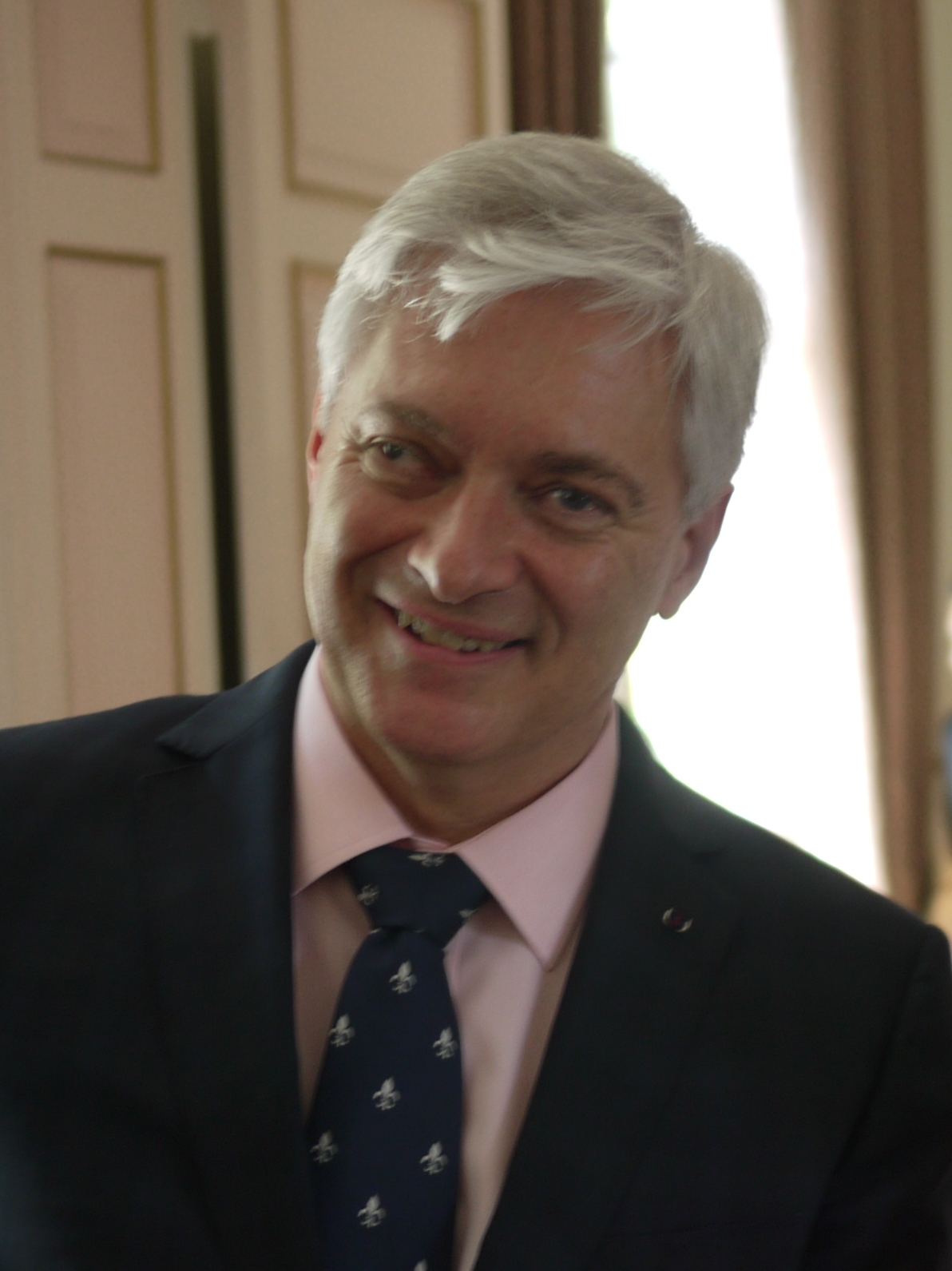
Strømmen in 2012

Wegger Christian Strømmen (born 14 June 1959) is a Norwegian diplomat and politician who is the current Norwegian Ambassador to the United Kingdom. He was Norwegian Ambassador to the United States in 2007–2013.

Strømmen was born in Larvik, Norway, and holds a master's of law degree from the University of Oslo.

He joined the Norwegian Diplomatic Service in 1984, and his first post was as executive officer (1984–86) in the Legal Department in the Ministry of Foreign Affairs, before he left to serve as a junior district court judge in Norway (1986–87). He was back in the diplomatic service as first secretary to the Norwegian Embassy in Tel Aviv, Israel, from 1988 to 1991, and to the Norwegian Permanent Mission in Geneva from 1991 to 1993.

From 1993 to 1995 he was a special advisor to Thorvald Stoltenberg, in his position as Special Representative of the UN Secretary-General for the former Yugoslavia and UN Co-Chairman of the Steering Committee of the International Conference on the former Yugoslavia. Other postings in the Norwegian foreign ministry include head of the legal department in the Foreign Ministry (1995–96), before he left to become a partner in the law firm of Wiersholm, Mellbye & Beech (1996–98) in Oslo.

From 1998 to 2000 he served as a State Secretary in the Ministry of Foreign Affairs as a part of the Bondevik's First Cabinet.

He returned to the diplomatic service as deputy permanent representative to the U.N. Security Council and chairman of the Security Council Working Group on Peacekeeping Operations from 2000 to 2002, then acted as deputy permanent representative of Norway's Permanent Mission to the United Nations in New York from 2002 to 2005. He was appointed Norway's permanent representative and ambassador to the United Nations and other international organizations in Geneva in 2005 serving until 2007, when he transferred to the Washington posting. He has been Norway′s Ambassador to the United Kingdom since 2019. On 27 January 2023, he was appointed Norway's next ambassador to Finland from the date the Ministry of Foreign Affairs decides.

He has lectured on international law at Harvard, Columbia, New York University, Georgetown, Stanford, the University of Bergen and University of Oslo. In addition, he has been a visiting fellow at the International Institute for Strategic Studies in London from 2000.

He is married and has two daughters.

Diplomatic posts
Preceded by Knut Vollebæk	Norwegian ambassador to the United States; 2007–2013	Succeeded by Kåre R. Aas
Preceded by Mona Juul	Norwegian ambassador to the United Kingdom; 2019–present	Incumbent
