= Yossi Beilin =

Israeli politician (born 1948)

- יוסי ביילין
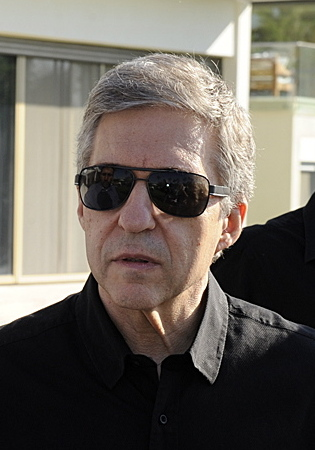

Ministerial roles
- 1995: Minister of Economics and Planning
- 1995–1996: Minister in the Prime Minister's Office
- 1999–2001: Minister of Justice
- 2000–2001: Minister of Religious Affairs

Faction represented in the Knesset
- 1988–1999: Labour
- 2006–2008: Meretz

Personal details
- Born: 12 June 1948 (age 78) Petah Tikva, Israel

Joseph "Yossi" Beilin (Hebrew: יוסף "יוסי" ביילין; born 12 June 1948) is an Israeli politician who has served in multiple ministerial and leadership positions in the Israeli government. Much of his political career was in the Labour Party. He also served as chairman of the Meretz-Yachad political party. After retiring from political life, Beilin founded 'Beilink', a business consultancy company. He also writes opinion pieces in Israeli papers Haaretz and Israel Hayom.

Beilin was a significant figure in the 1990s Israeli–Palestinian peace process. Then serving as Deputy Foreign Minister, he participated in the back-channel negotiations that eventually led to the adoption of the 1993 Oslo Accords, a framework agreement to end the Israeli–Palestinian conflict.

== Biography ==
Beilin was raised in Tel Aviv in a liberal traditional household, the son of Tzvi and Zehava (Bregman) Beilin, immigrants from Poland. At the age of bar mitzvah, he adopted a more rigorously religious life, though did not choose to wear a yarmulke (traditional Jewish cap). He studied in Herzliya Gymnasium school. In the Israel Defense Forces (IDF), he served in the signal corps and participated in the Six-Day War (1967) in Sinai in Division 8. In the Yom Kippur War (1973) he served in the army headquarters. The trauma of the war shook his faith and he stopped living a religious lifestyle.

=== Public life ===
In 1969 Beilin began his career as a journalist for the newspaper Davar and in 1977 entered the political arena as a spokesperson for the Labour Party. Following the 1984 election of Prime Minister Shimon Peres, he served as Cabinet Secretary and in 1986 became director of the Ministry of Foreign Affairs.

During this period he worked to distance Israel from the apartheid regime in South Africa. In 1988 Beilin was elected to the Knesset by the Labour Party. He was appointed Deputy Minister of Finance, a position he held until the dissolution of the National Unity Government in 1990.

While in the Labour Party, Beilin, along with Yair Hirschfeld and Ron Pundak established the Economic Cooperation Foundation (ECF).

Since 2018, Beilin is the Chairman of Hillel Student Organization in Israel.

=== Oslo Agreement, Geneva Initiative ===
In 1992, after the victory of the Labour Party, he was appointed Deputy Minister of Foreign Affairs under Shimon Peres. Secretly, without informing his superiors, Beilin began the Oslo Process, a critical agreement reached between Israel and the Palestinians that led to the establishment of the Palestinian Authority in the West Bank and Gaza.

In 1995, under the Prime Minister Yitzhak Rabin administration, he was appointed Minister of Economy and Planning. During this period he formulated with Mahmoud Abbas (Abu Mazen), the Beilin–Abu Mazen agreement as a possible basis for a final settlement between Israel and a Palestinian state. These agreements were never signed, but formed the basis of other initiatives. After the assassination of Yitzhak Rabin, Beilin served in the government of Shimon Peres as Minister in the Prime Minister's Office.

At that time Beilin was also interested in strengthening Israel's relations with world Jewry and American Jews in particular. He initiated the process that led to the establishment of the Birthright Program in 1999.

In 1997 he was second in line after Ehud Barak as contender for head of the Labour party and as candidate for Prime Minister. From 1999 to 2001, under Prime Minister Barak, he served as Minister of Justice. He also served for a short time as Minister of Religious Affairs. In a usual move for Israeli politicians, he resigned his Knesset seat when he became a minister in 1999.

In 2002, Beilin founded the extraparliamentary Shahar Movement, whose stated purpose was to unite Israel's left-wing parties. Beilin initially remained in the Labor party, but secured a low slot on the party's electoral list in the 2003 primaries, and thus left the party with Yael Dayan. The two ran on a joint list with Meretz and the Democratic Choice as representatives of the Shahar Movement. They were given the 11th and 12th slots on the joint list, but were not elected as the list won only 6 seats.

In 2004, the Shahar Movement merged with Meretz to form Yachad, later renamed Meretz-Yachad. Beilin was elected to lead the new movement in 2004, defeating MK Ran Cohen in an internal leadership contest. He then headed the party from 2004–2008. From 2006 to 2008, he represented Meretz in the Knesset. In 2008 he retired from political life.

In 2001 he participated in the Israeli–Palestinian Taba Talks in Egypt. As Beilin left government, he initiated the informal negotiation on a very detailed peace agreement model, with Palestinian minister Yasser Abed Rabbo and others.

In 2003, after a lengthy process, he signed the Geneva Accords, creating a possible structure of a permanent agreement between Israel and an independent Palestinian state. In an interview Prime Minister Ariel Sharon gave to the New York Times on April 14, 2004, Sharon said that one of the reasons for his unexpected decision to withdraw from Gaza was his attempt to prevent the implementation of the Geneva Initiative."

With the outbreak of the Second Lebanon War (2006), Beilin expressed support for the war. However, he objected to the introduction of ground forces, instead believing that Israel should attack military targets in Syria because it arms Hezbollah.

On October 28, 2008, prior to the eighteenth elections, Beilin announced his retirement from political life. On November 3, the Knesset held a farewell meeting for Beilin with, at the time Israeli President Shimon Peres and Prime Minister Ehud Olmert. Benjamin Netanyahu spoke as head of the opposition and Ehud Barak as head of the Labour Party.

He issued a condolence message on the death of Yasser Arafat, as well as proposals to transfer the ownership of the Shebah Farms to Lebanon and pardon Marwan Barghouti.

== Views ==
He is agnostic but finds being Jewish central to his identity. He is a social liberal.

In an op-ed published in The New York Times in May 2015, he called for the establishment of a joint Israeli-Palestinian confederation, without any "artificial partition". Israel and Palestine would be two independent states as part of this confederation, each with its own parliament and government, but will also have joint institutions that will deal with common issues such as water, infrastructure, environment, government and emergency services.

Beilin is a supporter of the Campaign for the Establishment of a United Nations Parliamentary Assembly, an organisation which advocates for democratic reformation of the United Nations.

In 2016, Beilin made headlines by criticizing the legacy of Benjamin Ben-Eliezer shortly after his death, calling him "an aggressive, destructive politician".

== Academic degrees and activity ==
Beilin has a Ph.D. from the University of Tel Aviv, where he also taught courses in Political Science for 13 years, and has published numerous books dealing with the peace process and Israeli politics and policy. Beilin was a visiting Professor in NYU during the Spring Semester 2020.

== Business activity ==
Beilin is currently the Founder and President of Beilink, a business consulting firm that help clients connect to new markets both in Israel and abroad, make strategic investments and decisions, forge strong international relationships with key stakeholders, navigate the spectrum between the political and private spheres, locate investors, and ultimately expand and strengthen businesses.

== Honours ==
In November 2009 he was appointed Légion d'honneur by the French ambassador to Israel. In the same year he received the journalistic prize Golden Doves for Peace issued by the Italian Research Institute Archivio Disarmo.
