= Terje Rød-Larsen =

Norwegian diplomat, politician (born 1947)

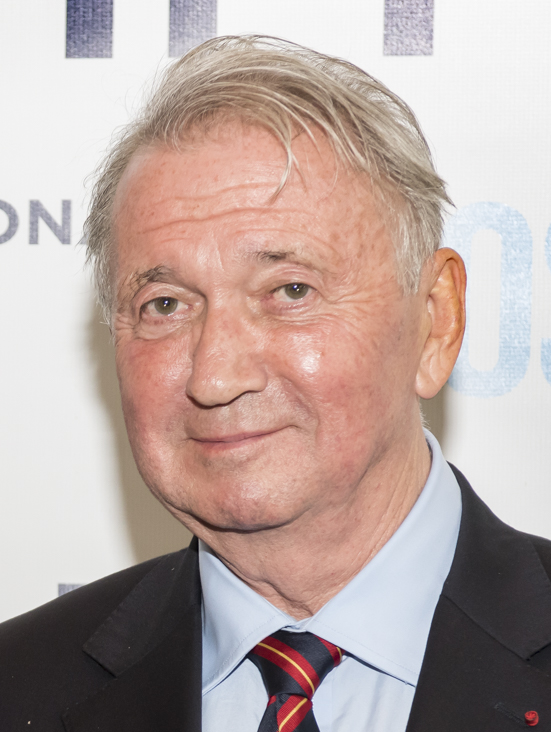
- Rød-Larsen in 2017

Minister of Administration and Planning
- In office 25 October 1996 – 28 November 1996
- Prime Minister: Thorbjørn Jagland
- Preceded by: Nils Totland
- Succeeded by: Bendik Rugaas

Personal details
- Born: 22 November 1947 (age 78) Bergen, Norway
- Party: Labour
- Spouse(s): Merete Alfsen (m. 1971; div. 1982) Mona Juul (m. 1988)
- Children: 3

Terje Rød-Larsen (born 22 November 1947) is a Norwegian former diplomat and politician. He held a number of public offices in Norway and at the UN until 2004.

After leaving public service, he became a close associate of Jeffrey Epstein, and has worked to bolster contact between the MAGA movement and the European far right. Rød-Larsen and his wife Mona Juul are both under investigation for corruption in Norway related to their ties to Epstein.

== Early life and education ==
Rød-Larsen grew up in Bergen and studied social sciences, culminating in a Ph.D. in sociology. He taught at Norwegian universities until 1981, when he helped found FAFO, a research organization funded by the Norwegian Confederation of Trade Unions. He married Merete Alfsen in 1971, with whom he had a daughter before their divorce in 1982.

== Career ==
Rød-Larsen came to wide international prominence as a key figure in the 1990s negotiations that led to the Oslo Accords—the first-ever agreements between Israel and the Palestine Liberation Organization (PLO)—when he served as the director of the Fafo institute. He is played by the actor Andrew Scott in the film Oslo, based on the play of the same name. In 1993, Rød-Larsen was appointed Ambassador and Special Adviser for the Middle East Peace process to the Norwegian Foreign Minister, and the following year, he became the United Nations Special Coordinator for the Middle East Peace Process at the rank of Under-Secretary-General. Rød-Larsen briefly served as the Deputy Prime Minister and Minister for Planning and Cooperation of Norway in the Jagland cabinet in 1996. He had to resign after a tax affair regarding him came to public attention.

Rød-Larsen then returned to the United Nations, where he again became an Under-Secretary-General, serving as the UN Special Coordinator for the Middle East Peace Process and Personal Representative of the Secretary-General to the Palestine Liberation Organization and the Palestinian Authority from 1999 to 2004. From 2004 to 2020, Rød-Larsen was the president of the International Peace Institute (IPI), based in New York City, adjacent to the United Nations, which the IPI works with extensively. He resigned in 2020 over previously undisclosed links to Jeffrey Epstein.

=== Fafo Institute ===
In 1982, Rød-Larsen founded the Fafo Institute for Applied Social Science in Oslo. Initially funded by the Norwegian Confederation of Trade Unions, Fafo later received support from major companies including Orkla, UMOE, Elkem, Coop Norge, Sparebank 1, and Telenor. As Fafo's director (1982–1993), he expanded the institute from a national research body into an internationally recognized think tank. Its field research on living conditions and labor issues in the Middle East contributed to the framework for the secret Oslo negotiations.

=== Early Middle East work ===
In 1989, Rød-Larsen moved to Cairo, when his wife Mona Juul, who worked for the Norwegian Ministry of Foreign Affairs, was stationed there. He continued to work for FAFO, as the organization had become more internationally oriented during the 1980s. Rød-Larsen performed a detailed sociological study of living conditions in the West Bank, Gaza and Eastern Jerusalem. In the course of this work, Rød-Larsen made contacts that proved to be useful in secret negotiations between Israel and the PLO.

=== Oslo Accords ===
When serving as the director of the Fafo institute in the early 1990s, Rød-Larsen became a key figure in the 1990s negotiations that led to the Oslo Accords—the first-ever agreements between Israel and the Palestine Liberation Organization (PLO). He served a pivotal role in the negotiations not only overtly, but in secret back-channel maneuvers and communications—largely arranged and facilitated by him and his wife, Norwegian diplomat Mona Juul. She was able to facilitate high-level contacts with the Norwegian foreign minister, Johan Jørgen Holst, who was instrumental in reaching the Oslo Accords—leading to the peace agreement signing on September 13, 1993 in Washington D.C.

The 2016-2017 Broadway play, Oslo, by J. T. Rogers, is a dramatization of the previously unheralded secret work of Rød-Larsen and his wife, and others, in developing the back-channel communications that (allegedly) saved the Oslo negotiations from collapsing. The same year Rød-Larsen became formally employed by the Norwegian Ministry of Foreign Affairs as a special advisor on Middle Eastern affairs.

=== Mid-1990s to mid-2000s ===
From 1994 to 1996, Rød-Larsen served as former UN Secretary-General Boutros Boutros-Ghali's first Special Coordinator in the Occupied Territories. (Note: The position of "Special Coordinator in the Occupied Territories" was the predecessor to the United Nations Special Coordinator for the Middle East Peace Process) In 1996, he briefly served as minister of administration in the government of Thorbjørn Jagland before resigning following a tax scandal. In 1999, UN Secretary-General Kofi Annan reappointed him as United Nations Special Coordinator for the Middle East Peace Process and as his personal representative to the PLO and Palestinian Authority in the West Bank and the Gaza Strip. He subsequently left the post in 2004 to become president of the International Peace Academy, a NYC-based think tank, and was also designated as UN Special Representative on 3 January 2005 for the implementation of Security Council Resolution 1559, which calls for Syrian withdrawal of Lebanon and the disarmament of Hezbollah.

=== International Peace Institute ===
In 2005, Rød-Larsen became President of the International Peace Institute (formerly International Peace Academy). Under his leadership, IPI expanded its headquarters, opened offices in Europe and the Middle East, and became a forum for UN-related dialogue. In October 2020, Rød-Larsen resigned after media revelations that IPI had accepted donations from entities connected to Jeffrey Epstein. The contributions represented less than 1% of IPI’s budget. An internal KPMG review found all donations were properly recorded and concluded that there was “no evidence that any laws or regulations were breached.” Rød-Larsen also disclosed that he had received and repaid a personal loan from Epstein.

=== 2006 Israel-Lebanon conflict ===
==== 16 August ====
Rød-Larsen was sent by U.N. Secretary-General Kofi Annan to Lebanon and Israel to follow up on the implementation of the cease-fire resolution, the United Nations announced on 16 August 2006.

==== 20 August ====
On this date Rød-Larsen told reporters. "There is a golden opportunity for Lebanon to solidify its democracy, to assert it authority, to produce a situation where Lebanon can be reconstructed and where Lebanese can live peacefully with its neighbors in prosperity. All this is at hand."

==== 22 August ====
The United Nations special envoy to Syria and Lebanon said on 22 August 2006 it could take the Lebanese army and international troops two to three months to fill a "security vacuum" in southern Lebanon and warned that "unintended" acts could spark renewed fighting. Terje Rød-Larsen said, "There is now a security vacuum which the Lebanese government is trying to fill" with the help of international forces, and added, "But I think realistically, up to a point, you will have such a vacuum in Lebanon for the next two, three months. The situation is still extremely fragile... Unintended incidents can kick off renewed violence, which might escalate and spin out of control."

=== Abraham Accords ===
In 2020, Rød-Larsen was involved in informal diplomatic contacts that contributed to the groundwork for the Abraham Accords between Israel and several Arab states. He attended the White House signing ceremony in September 2020.

== Reception ==
Rød-Larsen's work is associated with the practice of "track-two diplomacy", using informal channels to mediate conflicts. Although the Oslo process stalled in later years, scholars credit his methods as influential for subsequent peace initiatives. His reputation was affected by the Epstein donations controversy. On 29 October 2020, Rød-Larsen resigned the presidency of the IPI.

== Association with Jeffrey Epstein ==
Rød-Larsen was a close associate of Jeffrey Epstein and has worked to bolster contact between the MAGA movement and the European far right. A January 2026 release as part of the Epstein files indicated that each of Rød-Larsen's children were to be given $5 million in Epstein's will. In a statement, Rød-Larsen's wife said that the family had not been aware of the contents of the will before the document release and declined to comment further. Within the files, Rød-Larsen described Epstein as "my best friend" and "a thoroughly good human being". As of February 2026 Rød-Larsen is under investigation for corruption in Norway.

Norwegian authorities alerted U.S. Epstein investigators in 2019 after reports that Terje Rød-Larsen's think tank, the International Peace Institute, allegedly brought in young and unqualified women from Eastern Europe on very short internships whose photos were shared with Epstein.

Morits Skaugen, a Norwegian shipowner, said he was forced to sell his large Frogner apartment for half its value to Rød-Larsen and Juul, with Epstein acting as the middle man, stating that the sale was not voluntary and that his family was threatened on Rød-Larsen's and Juul's behalf by Epstein. Epstein showed Skaugen pictures of himself with the chairman of the bank that Skaugen's company had lent money from and a detailed map of all his business connections around the world, and also threatened to fire one of Skaugen's relatives from the International Peace Institute unless Skaugen sold Rød-Larsen the apartment for half its value. He described the actions taken by Rød-Larsen and Juul with the help of Epstein as "mafia methods".

Aftenposten described him as the central node in Epstein's network in Norway.

== Awards and honors ==
Rød-Larsen has received numerous international awards, including:

- Commander of the Légion d’Honneur (France, 2017)
- Commander of the National Order of the Cedar (Lebanon)
- Order of Merit (Palestinian Authority)
- Peer Gynt Prize (Norway, 1994, jointly with Mona Juul)
- Shimon Peres Peace Prize (Israel)
- Histadrut Peace Prize (Israel)
- Tipperary Peace Prize (Ireland)
- Kessler International Peace Prize (Germany)
- Carter-Menil Human Rights Prize (USA)

== Personal life ==
Rød-Larsen is married to diplomat Mona Juul, with whom he facilitated the Oslo negotiations. They have two children, twin siblings, one daughter and one son. On 29 April 2026, their son Edward died after committing suicide. Terje is also the father of author Hilde Rød-Larsen from his first marriage.

== Notes ==
Diplomatic posts
Preceded by Chinmaya Gharekhan	UN Special Coordinator for the Middle East Peace Process; 1 October 1999 – 31 May 2005	Succeeded by Álvaro de Soto
