= Ryan Steele (actor) =

American actor

- Born: August 3, 1990 (age 36); Walled Lake, Michigan, U.S.
- Occupations: Actor, dancer
- Years active: 2009–present

Ryan Steele (born August 3, 1990) is an American dancer and actor. He has performed on Broadway and in other performances, as well as in film and television. He is best known for the role of Specs in the 2012 musical Newsies.

== Early life and education ==
Steele was born and raised in Walled Lake, Michigan where he lived with his parents, and his brother and sister. The entire Steele family had taken dance classes; his mother in a 'moms dance class', his father in a 'dads dance class' along with both of his siblings. He started dancing at the age of five and instantly fell in love with it.

During elementary and high school he received training from a number of dance programs, including The Juilliard School. In his last few years of high school, Steele was training intensively in Ballet, focusing on a career in concert dance. Steele did not attend university, opting to take a year off and try out for different dance companies. In that year he got a contract with a ballet company in Texas. That year Steele also attended an open call for the 2009 revival of West Side Story, thus was the beginning of his career.

Steele is openly gay and his family has always been supportive of his career and sexuality. He was in a relationship with fellow Broadway actor Matt Doyle for two years.

== Career ==
=== Theatre ===
After high school Steele opted to take the year off and try out for different dance companies. In that year he got a contract with a ballet company in Texas. That year Steele also attended an open call for the 2009 revival of West Side Story where he got the part, leading him to pursue the role of Baby John. Steele was with the cast from opening night on March 19, 2009 to closing night on January 2, 2011.

Following West Side Story, Steele joined the cast of Newsies at the Paper Mill Playhouse in New Jersey, where he originated the role of Specs. When Newsies moved to Broadway, Steele reprised the role of Specs. Along with the role Steele also was the original dance captain for the musical. Steele was with the cast of Newsies from opening on March 29, 2012 until February 3, 2013 when he left to be part of the original cast of Matilda the Musical, from opening on April 11, 2013 until October 6, 2013.

Steele was also a member of the Billy Elliot the Musical cast, joining as a replacement swing and understudy on and off between January 4, 2011 and January 8, 2012.

=== Film and television ===
Steele's first film is Five Dances, written and directed by Alan Brown. Steele had the lead role, playing 18-year-old Chip, a young dancer who moved to New York City to pursue intensive ballet training.

In December 2014, Steele appeared as Curly, a Lost Boy, in NBC's Peter Pan Live! where he met his partner, Charlie Williams.

Steele was a dancer in the 2015 Academy Awards ceremony.

Steele also appeared as an ensemble member in the TV series Smash as well as in the pilot episode of The Miraculous Year.

== Filmography ==
=== Film ===
Year	Title	Role	Notes
2013	Five Dances	Chip Daniel	
2015	Broadway Draft 2015	Combine Judge	
2020	I’m Thinking of Ending Things	Dancing Jake	

=== Television ===
Year	Title	Role	Notes
2012	Smash	Sinner	Episode: "Hell on Earth"
2012-2014	Submissions Only	Dancer	4 episodes
2014	Peter Pan Live!	Curly	TV movie
2015	87th Academy Awards	Himself (dancer)	Television special
2015	The Battery's Down	Sailor	Episode: "Reunion"

=== Theater ===
Year	Title	Role	Notes
2009	West Side Story (Revival)	Baby John	Palace Theatre
2011	Newsies	Specs	Paper Mill Playhouse
2012-2013	Newsies	Specs (Dance Captain)	Nederlander Theatre
2013	Matilda	Henchman	Shubert Theatre
2016	An American in Paris	Jerry (Alternate)	National Tour
2018	Carousel	Ensemble	Imperial Theatre
2023	Once Upon a One More Time	Prince Erudite	Marquis Theatre

== Awards and nominations ==
Year	Award	Category	Title	Result	Ref.
2013	Iris Prize	Best Actor	Five Dances	Won	
2023	Chita Rivera Award	Outstanding Male Dancer in an Off-Broadway Show	Only Gold	Won	
