= Furber =

Furber is a surname. Notable people with the surname include:

- Alex Furber (born 1987), Canadian actor
- Aurilla Furber (1847–1898), American poet, writer, editor, activist
- Darcy Furber (born 1972), Canadian politician
- Douglas Furber (1885–1961), British lyricist and playwright
- Edward Price Furber (1864–1940), British obstetrician and surgeon
- Holden Furber (1903–1993), American professor
- Joseph W. Furber (1814–1884), American politician
- Mike Furber (1948–1973), English-born entertainer
- Robert Furber (1674–1756), British horticulturist and author
- Steve Furber (born 1953), British professor
- William H. Furber (1828–1912), American politician

== See also ==
- John P. Furber House, historic house in Cottage Grove, Minnesota, US
