= Frances O'Connor =

English-born Australian actress (born 1967)

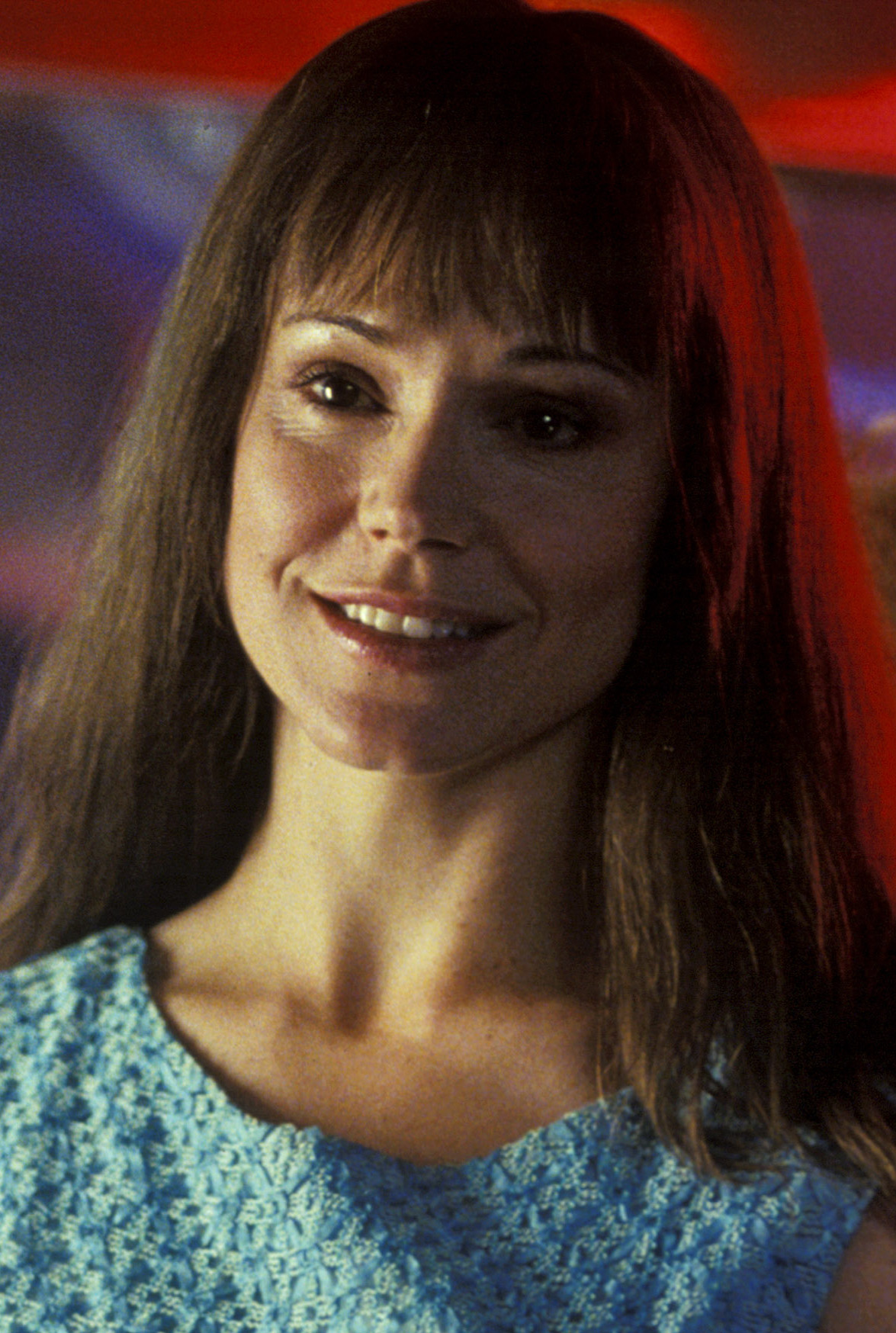
- O'Connor in Three Dollars (2005)
- Born: Frances Ann O'Connor; 12 June 1967 (age 59); Wantage, Berkshire, England
- Education: Curtin University
- Occupations: Actress; director; writer
- Years active: 1991–present
- Notable work: Mansfield Park; Bedazzled; A.I. Artificial Intelligence; The Importance of Being Earnest; Timeline
- Spouse: Gerald Lepkowski (m. 2011)
- Children: 1
- Awards: AACTA Award for Best Actress in a Leading Role; Blessed (2009)

Frances Ann O'Connor (born 12 June 1967) is an English-born Australian actress. She is best known for her roles in film and television, including Mansfield Park (1999), Bedazzled (2000), A.I. Artificial Intelligence (2001), The Importance of Being Earnest (2002) and Wednesday (2025).

O'Connor won an AACTA Award for her performance in Blessed (2009) and also earned two Golden Globe Award nominations in Madame Bovary (2000) and The Missing (2014-2016). In 2022, she ventured into directing with her debut feature film Emily.

== Early life ==
O'Connor was born in Wantage, Berkshire, England, but moved with her family to Perth, Western Australia, when she was two years old. She is of Irish descent and was raised Roman Catholic. O'Connor attended Mercedes College in Perth before studying at the Western Australian Academy of Performing Arts and Curtin University in the same city; earning a Bachelor of Arts degree from the latter.

== Career ==
Not long after graduating from WAAPA in late 1992, O'Connor joined the supporting cast of television drama series Law of the Land as Marissa Green. She also appeared in the Melbourne Theatre Company's production of The Dutch Courtesan in June 1993, followed by a production of Much Ado About Nothing with Hugo Weaving and Pamela Rabe in August 1993. O'Connor made her film debut in Emma-Kate Croghan's critically acclaimed independent romantic comedy Love and Other Catastrophes (1996). She received her first AACTA Award for Best Actress in a Leading Role nomination for her performance in the film. In 1997, she had the leading role in Kiss or Kill, and starred opposite Cate Blanchett and Richard Roxburgh in Thank God He Met Lizzie. In 1999, O'Connor starred as Fanny Price in the British romantic comedy-drama Mansfield Park. The film also received favourable reviews from critics. The following year, O'Connor earned a Golden Globe Award nomination for her performance as Emma Bovary in the film Madame Bovary.

In 2000, O'Connor began her Hollywood career with a role in the remake with Brendan Fraser and Elizabeth Hurley of the 1967 British film Bedazzled. The following year, she had a leading role in the Steven Spielberg science fiction drama A.I. Artificial Intelligence, earning her a nomination for a Saturn Award for Best Actress. In 2002, she starred alongside Rupert Everett, Colin Firth and Judi Dench in the romantic comedy-drama The Importance of Being Earnest, directed by Oliver Parker and based on Oscar Wilde's classic play. In 2003, O'Connor starred opposite Paul Walker in the science fiction film Timeline, which bombed at the box office.

In 2004, O'Connor returned to independent films and starred in Book of Love opposite Simon Baker, and Iron Jawed Angels with Hilary Swank, Julia Ormond and Anjelica Huston. In 2008, she starred in the short-lived ABC comedy-drama series Cashmere Mafia alongside Lucy Liu, Miranda Otto and Bonnie Somerville. In 2009, she won an AACTA Award for Best Actress for her performance in Blessed. She later appeared in Jayne Mansfield's Car, Little Red Wagon and The Truth About Emanuel; and received two more AACTA Award for Best Actress nominations for Three Dollars (2005) and The Hunter (2011). In 2011, O'Connor was cast in the ABC drama pilot Hallelujah, created by Marc Cherry, but the show was not picked up to series. From 2013 to 2014, she starred as Rose Selfridge in the British period drama Mr Selfridge.

In 2014, O'Connor was cast as the lead in the British drama The Missing. She was nominated for the Golden Globe Award for Best Actress – Miniseries or Television Film for her performance in the series. She then appeared as Belle's mother Colette in the fourth season of the American series Once Upon a Time. In 2016, O'Connor co-starred in the horror film The Conjuring 2, alongside Vera Farmiga and Patrick Wilson, and in Cleverman, opposite Iain Glen.

In 2022, O'Connor made her directorial debut with Emily, a biographical drama she also wrote, about the life of English writer Emily Brontë (portrayed by Emma Mackey).

== Personal life ==
O'Connor and her long-term partner, Gerald Lepkowski, had a son in 2005. The couple married in 2011 at O'Connor's mother's residence in Australia.

== Filmography ==
=== Film ===
| Year | Title | Role | Notes |
|---|---|---|---|
| 1995 | Bathing Boxes | 2nd Woman | Short film |
| 1996 | Love and Other Catastrophes | Mia | |
| 1997 | Kiss or Kill | Nikki Davies | |
| 1997 | Thank God He Met Lizzie | Jenny Follett | |
| 1998 | A Little Bit of Soul | Kate Haslett | |
| 1999 | A Margherita with Hot Salami | Diana | Short film |
| 1999 | Mansfield Park | Fanny Price | |
| 2000 | About Adam | Laura Owens | |
| 2000 | Bedazzled | Alison Gardner/Nicole Delarusso | |
| 2001 | A.I. Artificial Intelligence | Monica Swinton | |
| 2002 | The Importance of Being Earnest | Gwendolen Fairfax | |
| 2002 | Windtalkers | Rita Swelton | |
| 2003 | Timeline | Kate Ericson | |
| 2004 | Iron Jawed Angels | Lucy Burns | |
| 2004 | Book of Love | Elaine Walker | |
| 2005 | Three Dollars | Tanya Harnovey | |
| 2005 | The Lazarus Child | Alison Heywood | |
| 2005 | Piccadilly Jim | Ann Chester | |
| 2009 | Blessed | Rhonda | |
| 2011 | The Hunter | Lucy Armstrong | |
| 2012 | Jayne Mansfield's Car | Camilla Bedford | |
| 2012 | Best Man Down | Jaime Anderson | |
| 2012 | Little Red Wagon | Margaret Craig | |
| 2013 | The Truth About Emanuel | Janice | |
| 2014 | Mercy | Rebecca McCoy | |
| 2016 | The Conjuring 2 | Peggy Hodgson | |
| 2020 | Go! | Christie Hooper | |
| 2022 | Emily | —N/a | Writer, director |
| 2025 | The Conjuring: Last Rites | Peggy Hodgson | Cameo |

=== Television ===
| Year | Title | Role | Notes | Ref |
|---|---|---|---|---|
| 1993 | Law of the Land | Marissa Green | Recurring role | |
| 1994 | The Damnation of Harvey McHugh | Georgina | 1 episode: "Heaven Knows Mr. McHugh" | |
| 1995 | The Man from Snowy River | Rachel McAlister | Season 2, 2 episodes | |
| 1995 | Halifax f.p. | Frances | Television film series, episode 3: "The Feeding" | |
| 1996 | Blue Heelers | Gabe Greenway | 3 episodes | |
| 1996 | G.P. | Karen Papadopoulos | Episode: "Someone to Turn To" | |
| 1996 | Shark Bay | Dr. Jane | Regular role | |
| 1997 | Frontline | Kristy | Episode: "I Get the Big Names" | |
| 2000 | Madame Bovary | Emma Bovary | Television film | |
| 2008 | Cashmere Mafia | Zoe Burden | Recurring role | |
| 2009 | Nova | Emma Darwin | Documentary series, 1 episode: "Darwin's Darkest Hour" | |
| 2011 | Ice | Sarah Fitch | Miniseries, 2 episodes | |
| 2011 | Hallelujah | Ruth Turner | Unsold pilot, US | |
| 2013 | Vegas | Barbara Kent | Episode: "From This Day Forward" | |
| 2013–2014 | Mr Selfridge | Rose Selfridge | Main role | |
| 2014 | The Missing | Emily Hughes | Miniseries, Main role | |
| 2014 | Once Upon a Time | Colette | Episode: "Family Business" | |
| 2016 | Cleverman | Dr. Charlotte Cleary | Main role | |
| 2017 | Locke & Key | Nina | Unsold pilot | |
| 2018 | Troy: Fall of a City | Hecuba | Main role | |
| 2020 | The End | Dr. Kate Brennan | Main role | |
| 2023 | Erotic Stories | Annabel | Episode: "Come As You Are" | |
| 2024 | The Twelve | Meredith Nelson-Moore QC | Recurring role | |
| 2025 | Wednesday | Francoise Galpin | Season 2, recurring role | |
| TBA | Queenstown | TBA | Main cast | |

== Stage ==
| Year | Title | Role | Notes |
|---|---|---|---|
| 1991 | The Skin of Our Teeth | | Brisbane Arts Theatre |
| 1992 | The Caucasian Chalk Circle | | WAAPA |
| 1993 | The Dutch Courtesan | Crispinella | Russell Street Theatre, Melbourne with MTC |
| 1993 | Much Ado About Nothing | Ursula | Playhouse, Melbourne, Theatre Royal, Hobart, Princess Theatre, Launceston with MTC |
| 1994 | The Grapes of Wrath | Rose of Sharon Joad | Playhouse, Melbourne with MTC |
| 1994 | The Lady from the Sea | Bolette | Russell Street Theatre, Melbourne with MTC |
| 1995 | Blabbermouth | Batts | Fairfax Studio, Melbourne with MTC & Arena Theatre Company |
| 1995 | Lady Windermere's Fan | Lady Windermere | Playhouse, Melbourne with MTC |
| 1996 | Kid Stakes | Olive | Playhouse, Melbourne, Gold Coast Arts Centre with MTC |
| 1998 | The Herbal Bed | Susanna | Fairfax Studio, Melbourne with MTC |
| 2001 | Cat on a Hot Tin Roof | Maggie the Cat | Lyric Theatre, London |
| 2006 | Tom & Viv | Vivienne Haigh-Wood | Almeida Theatre, London |

== Awards and nominations ==
| Year | Association | Category | Work | Result |
|---|---|---|---|---|
| 1996 | AACTA Awards | Best Actress in a Leading Role | Love and Other Catastrophes | Nominated |
| 1997 | AACTA Awards | Best Actress in a Leading Role | Kiss or Kill | Nominated |
| 1997 | Film Critics Circle of Australia | Best Actress | Kiss or Kill | Won |
| 1997 | Montreal World Film Festival | Best Actress | Kiss or Kill | Won |
| 1997 | AACTA Awards | Best Actress in a Leading Role | Thank God He Met Lizzie | Nominated |
| 1999 | Satellite Awards | Best Actress – Motion Picture Musical or Comedy | Mansfield Park | Nominated |
| 2000 | Golden Globe Awards | Best Actress – Miniseries or Television Film | Madame Bovary | Nominated |
| 2001 | Saturn Awards | Best Actress | A.I. Artificial Intelligence | Nominated |
| 2001 | American Film Institute | Featured Actor of the Year – Female – Movies | A.I. Artificial Intelligence | Nominated |
| 2002 | Empire Awards | Best Actress | A.I. Artificial Intelligence | Nominated |
| 2005 | AACTA Awards | Best Actress in a Leading Role | Three Dollars | Nominated |
| 2009 | AACTA Awards | Best Actress in a Leading Role | Blessed | Won |
| 2009 | Film Critics Circle of Australia | Best Actress | Blessed | Won |
| 2011 | Film Critics Circle of Australia | Best Actress | The Hunter | Won |
| 2011 | AACTA Awards | Best Actress in a Leading Role | The Hunter | Nominated |
| 2013 | Ashland Independent Film Festival | Best Acting Ensemble | The Truth About Emanuel | Won |
| 2014 | Golden Globe Awards | Best Actress – Miniseries or Television Film | The Missing | Nominated |
| 2014 | Golden Nymph Awards | Outstanding Actress in a Miniseries | The Missing | Won |
