= Alan Brown (filmmaker) =

American director and author

Alan Brown in American director and author.

== Filmmaker ==
Brown's first film, the half-hour narrative O Beautiful, won the Future Filmmaker Award at the 2002 Palm Springs International Short Film Festival and was an official selection of the 2003 Sundance Film Festival. It was released in an anthology of three other gay-themed short films entitled Boys Life 4.

Brown's feature debut, Book of Love, which stars Simon Baker, Frances O'Connor, Gregory Smith, and Bryce Dallas Howard, premiered in the Dramatic Competition at the 2004 Sundance Film Festival.

His second feature film, Superheroes, tells the story of an Iraq War veteran with post traumatic stress disorder. It was the winner of numerous prizes, including the Feature Filmmaker’s Award at the 2007 Avignon/New York Film Festival and the Maverick Spirit Award at the 2008 Cinequest Film Festival.

Brown's third feature, Private Romeo is a contemporary adaptation of Shakespeare's Romeo and Juliet set in an all-male high school military academy. The film stars New York stage actors Seth Numrich, Matt Doyle, and Hale Appleman. Singled out by critics for being "hugely adventurous and highly liberated," Private Romeo was a New York Times Critic's Pick and won a Grand Jury Prize at Outfest 2011.

Brown's fourth narrative feature film, Five Dances, was shot in New York City in the winter of 2012. Set in the downtown modern dance world, Five Dances shows dancers performing choreography by Jonah Bokaer. The film was released in June 2013.

== Writer ==
Brown is also the author of the novel Audrey Hepburn's Neck, which was translated into eight languages and won the Pacific Rim Book Prize. The recipient of National Endowment for the Arts and New York Foundation for the Arts fellowships, he was also awarded a Fulbright Fellowship in Journalism to Japan, where he lived for seven years.

== Filmography ==
- 2002: O Beautiful (short)
  - 2003: Boys Life 4: Four Play (segment: O Beautiful)
- 2004: Book of Love
- 2007: Superheroes
- 2011: Private Romeo
- 2013: Five Dances
