= Book of Love (2004 film) =

- Directed by: Alan Brown
- Written by: Alan Brown
- Produced by: Robert Ahrens
- Starring: Frances O'Connor; Bryce Dallas Howard; Simon Baker; Gregory Smith
- Distributed by: Sundance
- Release date: January 18, 2004
- Running time: 83 minutes
- Country: United States
- Language: English
- Box office: $1,382,259

Book of Love is a 2004 American film written and directed by Alan Brown and starring Frances O'Connor, Simon Baker, and Gregory Smith.

== Premise ==
A young woman named Elaine (Frances O'Connor) and her husband, David Walker (Simon Baker) meet a lonely fifteen-year-old, Chet Becker (Gregory Smith), in an ice-cream shop. Over time, the couple becomes friendly with Chet, who develops a crush on Elaine that culminates in a one-night stand. Elaine later confesses her infidelity to David, and their marriage is destroyed by the affair.

== Cast and crew ==
- Frances O'Connor as Elaine Walker
- Simon Baker as David Walker
- Gregory Smith as Chet Becker
- Bryce Dallas Howard as Heather
- Joanna Adler as Melissa
- Sabrina Grdevich as Lilian
- Ari Graynor as Naomi
- Beth MacDonald as Yoga Instructor
- Brett Tabor as Coach
- Van Hughes as Swimmer #1
- C.J. Aker as Swimmer #2
- Rob Ahrens as Producer
- William Rexer as Director of Photography
- Trevor Ristow as Editor
