= Five Dances =

- Directed by: Alan Brown
- Written by: Alan Brown
- Starring: Ryan Steele; Reed Luplau; Catherine Miller; Kimiye Corwin; Luke Murphy
- Release dates: February 1, 2013 (Dance on Camera Film Festival); October 4, 2013 (U.S.)
- Country: United States
- Language: English

Five Dances is a 2013 film written and directed by Alan Brown and starring Ryan Steele, Reed Luplau, Catherine Miller, Kimiye Corwin, and Luke Murphy.

== Plot ==
Chip, a young dancer who recently arrived in New York City, starts to train and practice with three other dancers and the ballet master; the dancing room where they practice is in SoHo. While patiently rehearsing each figure of the five dances making up the ballet, Chip has to choose between going back to his family home in the Midwest and starting his own career and personal life.

== Cast ==
- Ryan Steele as Chip
- Reed Luplau as Theo
- Catherine Miller as Katie
- Kimye Corwin as Cynthia
- Luke Murphy as Anthony
- Lulu Roche as Chip's mother (voice)

== Soundtrack ==
- "252" – Gem Club
- "Dog" – Scott Matthew
- "Friends & Foes" – Scott Matthew
- "Surgery" – Scott Matthew
- "Sinking" – Scott Matthew
- "Goldberg Variations, BWV 988: Aria" – Johann Sebastian Bach
- "Put Your Back N 2 It" – Perfume Genius

The score soundtrack of movie was composed by Nicholas Wright.

- "Five Dances Theme"
- "Nowhere to Go"
- "Love in Slow Motion"
- "The Man in the Mouth"
- "I Don't Dream"
- "First Kiss"
- "Waking Up"
- "Cynthia"
- "Pirouette"

== Awards ==
| Year | Nomination | Place | Result |
|---|---|---|---|
| 2013 | Best Featured Film – Popular Jury | Rio Gay Film Festival | Won |
| 2013 | Best Featured Film – Official Jury | Rio Gay Film Festival | Won |
| 2013 | Best International Narrative Feature | 8th Tel Aviv, LGBT International Film Festival | Won |
| 2013 | Best Actor: Ryan Steele | Iris Prize Festival, Cardiff | Won |

== Critical reception ==
The Hollywood Reporter said "The hard work and copious sweat that go into rehearsing a new dance piece is captured with visceral effect in Alan Brown's sensitive drama set mostly within the confines of a Soho dance studio. Centering on a newly arrived 18-year-old Kansas innocent who discovers love, friendship and an awareness of his physical gifts, Five Dances should well impress dance aficionados even if its skimpy narrative proves less than inspired."

Variety said "An extraordinary dancer, Ryan Steele, dominates "Five Dances," the camera pivoting on his every sinewy stretch and turn. Almost all of writer-director Alan Brown's latest feature transpires in a Soho studio where a small troupe is rehearsing five pieces choreographed by Jonah Bokaer. But rather than adapting the pieces to conform to his paper-thin narrative, Brown explores the tensions and contortions of dancers expressing fresh emotion through a pre-existing art form. The result avoids docu-style randomness while furthering only the most rudimentary story and character points, allowing the dance to speak largely, and magnificently, for itself."

New York Times said "Five people rehearsing in an otherwise vacant dance studio: That pitch may not appeal to everyone, but fans of the movement arts and ensemble acting will appreciate the possibilities. Yet few of those possibilities are explored with any depth in "Five Dances," a promising though static new film that never leaves its taciturn shadows for a single emotionally gripping moment."

NPR said "In fact, the quiet appeal of Alan Brown's sensually photographed film (Derek McKane is the cinematographer) is in the way it extends that vocabulary into its non-dance scenes; it's a gentle, if slight, narrative full of fraught looks and knowing silences — which, frankly, might grow tiresome in another context — that communicate mood and character as clearly and lyrically as a fine dance piece."
