= The Importance of Being Earnest (2002 film) =

2002 film by Oliver Parker

- Theatrical release poster
- Directed by: Oliver Parker
- Screenplay by: Oliver Parker
- Based on: The Importance of Being Earnest; 1895 play by Oscar Wilde
- Produced by: Barnaby Thompson
- Starring: Rupert Everett; Colin Firth; Frances O'Connor; Reese Witherspoon; Judi Dench; Tom Wilkinson; Anna Massey; Edward Fox
- Cinematography: Tony Pierce-Roberts
- Edited by: Guy Bensley
- Music by: Charlie Mole
- Production companies: Ealing Studios; Film Council; Fragile Films; Newmarket Capital Group
- Distributed by: Miramax Films (United States); Miramax International (United Kingdom; through Buena Vista International)
- Release dates: 17 May 2002 (US); 6 September 2002 (UK)
- Running time: 97 minutes
- Countries: United Kingdom; United States
- Language: English
- Budget: $15 million
- Box office: $17.2 million

The Importance of Being Earnest is a 2002 romantic comedy-drama film directed by Oliver Parker, based on Oscar Wilde's classic 1895 comedy of manners of the same name. A British-American co-production, the film stars Colin Firth, Rupert Everett, Frances O'Connor, Reese Witherspoon, and Judi Dench in lead roles, with Tom Wilkinson, Anna Massey, and Edward Fox in supporting roles.

The plot follows two men, John Worthing (Firth) and Algernon Moncrieff (Everett), who both use the name "Ernest" to escape social obligations, leading to romantic entanglements and comedic misunderstandings.

The Importance of Being Earnest was released on May 17, 2002.

== Plot ==
In this adaptation of Oscar Wilde's play about fake identities, two gentlemen in the 1890s London use the same pseudonym, Ernest, for their secret courtship activities. Chaos ensues when both men find themselves face-to-face and have to explain who they really are.

== Cast ==
- Rupert Everett as Algernon "Algy" Moncrieff
- Colin Firth as John "Jack" Worthing/Ernest
- Frances O'Connor as Gwendolen Fairfax
- Reese Witherspoon as Cecily Cardew
- Judi Dench as Lady Bracknell
- Tom Wilkinson as Dr Chasuble
- Anna Massey as Miss Prism
- Edward Fox as Lane
- Patrick Godfrey as Merriman
- Charles Kay as Gribsby
- Cyril Shaps as Pew Opener
- Marsha Fitzalan as Dowager

== Release ==
The Importance of Being Earnest grossed $8,384,929 domestically and $8,906,041 internationally, for a worldwide total of $17,290,970, against a production budget of $15 million.

== Reception ==
On the review aggregator website Rotten Tomatoes, as of September 2012, The Importance of Being Earnest holds a 57% approval rating, with the consensus stating, "Oliver Parker's adaptation of Wilde's classic play is breezy entertainment, helped by an impressive cast, but it also suffers from some peculiar directorial choices that ultimately dampen the film's impact." On Metacritic, the film has a rating of 60 out of 100 based on 30 critic reviews, indicating "mixed or average" reviews.

Peter Bradshaw of The Guardian criticised the film for "stodgily collapsing" before the climax. Roger Ebert of the Chicago Sun-Times awarded the film 3 stars out of 4, praising the well-cast actors and their performances.

== Awards and nominations ==
The Importance of Being Earnest won the 2003 Italian National Syndicate of Film Journalists's Silver Ribbon award for Best Costume Design (for Maurizio Millenotti).

Moreover, Reese Witherspoon's performance also earned her a nomination for the Teen Choice Award for Choice Movie Actress – Comedy in 2002.
