= Fairy Tale (novel) =

2022 novel by Stephen King

- First edition cover
- Author: Stephen King
- Audio read by: Seth Numrich
- Illustrators: Gabriel Rodríguez; Nicolas Delort
- Cover artist: Will Staehle
- Language: English
- Genre: Dark Fantasy
- Publisher: Scribner
- Publication date: September 6, 2022
- Publication place: United States
- Media type: Print (Hardcover)
- Pages: 608 (hardcover) 624 (paperback)
- ISBN: 978-1-66800-217-9

Fairy Tale is a dark fantasy novel by American author Stephen King, published on September 6, 2022, by Scribner. The novel follows Charlie Reade, a 17-year-old who inherits keys to a hidden, otherworldly realm, and finds himself leading the battle between forces of good and evil.

== Plot ==
Charlie Reade, a 17-year-old boy, lives in Sentry's Rest, Illinois, with his widowed father, George. When Charlie was seven years old, his mother was struck and killed by a van; the resulting grief led his father to alcoholism, from which he eventually recovered with the help of a friend and co-worker, though Charlie remains fearful that he will someday resume drinking.

One day in April 2013, Charlie discovers his elderly neighbor, Mr. Howard Bowditch, injured in his yard. Feeling indebted to a higher power for his father's recovery, Charlie agrees to care for Mr. Bowditch's elderly German Shepherd, Radar, while he stays in the hospital. He also looks after Mr. Bowditch himself when he returns home. During that period, Mr. Bowditch shares with Charlie both his .45 caliber handgun and a surprising stash of gold pellets that he uses to pay his hospital bills.

Several months later, Radar's health has significantly declined and Mr. Bowditch dies of a heart attack. He leaves Charlie a recorded message, revealing that he was actually 120 years old, and that the locked shed in his backyard contains a portal to another world. In this world exists a magical sundial, which was the secret to his longevity. He also reveals this world as the source of his gold and urges Charlie to keep it secret to prevent its exploitation. Determined to save Radar's life, Charlie decides to seek out the sundial and revitalize her.

Armed with two handguns, Charlie travels with Radar to the other world, which he learns is called Empis. He meets a shoemaker named Dora and exiled members of the Gallien royal family: they are Leah, Stephen "Woody" Woodleigh, and Claudia, who provide Charlie with guidance and food. Charlie learns of Flight Killer, the great evil that purged the royal family. The surviving members were cursed with disability and disfigurement and the inhabitants of Empis are afflicted with an illness known as "the gray".

Charlie navigates to the deserted city of Lilimar and finds the sundial, restoring Radar to her younger self. On their way out of the city, interference causes Charlie to become lost, and they are ambushed by an army of undead "night soldiers". Radar escapes but Charlie is taken captive to an underground prison called the Deep Maleen. There, he and the other inmates are forced to train for a gladiatorial-style tournament known as the Fair One. Charlie learns that Flight Killer is actually Leah's brother, Elden. He also discovers that his formerly brown hair and eyes are turning blond and blue respectively, which the inmates believe is a sign that he is their true prince and savior. Eventually the Fair One begins; Charlie survives the first round but before the second round begins, he and the remaining inmates escape with the help of a warder named Pursey.

Charlie is reunited with Radar, Dora, and the Gallien family. They tell Charlie of Elden's past: as the two youngest siblings, Leah and Elden were very close. Elden, however, was badly bullied for his appearance and deformities. At some point he discovered the Deep Well, which can be opened only when the two moons of Empis touch in the sky and is the dwelling place of an evil creature called Gogmagog. Elden opened the Deep Well, which led to him becoming Flight Killer, attaining power as Gogmagog's puppet and cursing Empis out of revenge for his mistreatment. They plan to return to Lilimar and defeat Flight Killer before the moons collide again and he can open the Deep Well once more. Leah is conflicted due to her love for Elden, refusing to believe that her brother is actually Flight Killer. However, Charlie convinces her to join them.

Charlie, Leah, and Radar lead a small group to infiltrate the city and eventually find the Deep Well, with Flight Killer waiting at its entrance just as the two moons collide and the well opens. Leah, finally seeing Flight Killer with her own eyes, accepts what he has become and stabs him with her dagger before he is dragged into the well by Gogmagog and killed. As Gogmagog emerges, Charlie—reminded of the story of Rumpelstiltskin—repeatedly declares its name, causing it to retreat back into the well in defeat. They return to the surface, where Charlie announces their victory and proclaims Leah as their new queen.

Charlie recovers from his injuries sustained from the encounter, and his hair and eyes revert to their original color; meanwhile, the citizens begin to rebuild the city. At last, Charlie and Radar say goodbye and return home through the portal, arriving back in Sentry's Rest in February 2014. Charlie, who was reported missing in the four months that he was in Empis, reunites with his father in a deep embrace. In the epilogue, Charlie takes his father on one last trip to Empis to prove to him its existence before sealing off its entrance with concrete, preventing anyone else from finding it.

== Background ==
The release date, September 6, was officially announced by Entertainment Weekly on January 24. The article also featured an excerpt from the book. On August 11, 2022, Simon & Schuster also featured King on their YouTube page, where he narrated a chapter from Fairy Tale as a part of its promotion.

== Reception ==
In a review, Matt Bell of The New York Times described Fairy Tale as "a solid episodic adventure, a page-turner driven by memorably strange encounters and well-rendered, often thrilling action". The novel topped USA Today's Best-Selling Books list starting the week of September 15, 2022, beating Colleen Hoover's It Ends with Us and Verity, and Delia Owens' Where the Crawdads Sing. The Michigan Daily's Emilia Ferrante, while praising King's work for its "sense of wonder and curiosity" and his storytelling abilities, notes that the work does walk the line of falling into the familiar controversial trope of equating physical disfigurement with being scary, one that disguises itself behind body horror. Kirkus awarded the book a starred review, stating that the book was "at once familiar and full of odd and unexpected twists". Similarly, Alison Flood from The Guardian described the novel as "vintage, timeless King, a transporting, terrifying treat born from multiple lockdowns".

== TV series adaptation ==
On September 15, 2022, Deadline Hollywood reported that British filmmaker Paul Greengrass, known for the Jason Bourne film franchise, would adapt, direct, and produce a film adaptation of the novel, with American film producer Gregory Goodman co-producing the film alongside Greengrass. On October 16, 2024, Deadline Hollywood reported that the project was being turned into a ten-episode series, with J.H. Wyman as showrunner.
