= War Horse (play) =

2007 play by Nick Stafford

- War Horse stageplay advertising poster
- Original language: English
- Written by: Michael Morpurgo (novel); Nick Stafford (play)
- Genre: Drama
- Setting: England, France (1912–1918)

Premiere
- Date: 17 October 2007
- Place: Royal National Theatre, London, England
- National Theatre (London); Lincoln Center Theater (New York); Princess of Wales Theatre (Toronto)

War Horse is a play based on the book of the same name by writer Michael Morpurgo, adapted for stage by Nick Stafford. Originally Morpurgo thought "they must be mad" to try to make a play from his best-selling 1982 novel; but the play was a great success. The play's West End and Broadway productions are directed by Marianne Elliott and Tom Morris; it features life-size horse puppets by the Handspring Puppet Company of South Africa, the movements of which were choreographed by Toby Sedgwick.

== Synopsis ==
A foal is auctioned for sale in Devon, the United Kingdom. Hoping to give it to his son Billy, Arthur Narracott bids on the foal; instead, his brother Ted competes with him and bids 39 guineas—an exorbitant amount that Arthur can't meet – and wins the foal. Ted is the local drunkard and thought to be a coward, for refusing to have fought together with his brother in the earlier Boer War in South Africa. At the auction, Ted used money reserved to pay his farm mortgage. Ted's wife Rose fears they will lose their farm. Their son Albert promises to raise the foal and train him for sale. The boy names the foal Joey, and forms a strong bond with the horse during training.

Jealous of his cousin Albert, Billy convinces his father to get Ted drunk and make a bet: if Joey (bred and trained as a hunter, not a plough horse) can be taught to plough within a week, Arthur will pay Ted 39 guineas, the auction price. If Joey won't plough, Billy gets the horse. Albert successfully teaches Joey to pull the plough and gets to keep him.

News of the outbreak of World War I reaches Devon. When Ted sells Joey to the cavalry, Albert is crushed. Captain James Nicholls, who often sketched Albert riding the hunter, promises that he will personally look after the fine horse. At the same time, Arthur enlists Billy to fight despite his protests. Arthur gives Billy his grandfather's knife for protection. Joey and Topthorn (another army horse) are shipped to France. The charges of the British cavalry are overwhelmed by the fire from German machine guns, representing their new technology. During the first charge, Nicholls is shot and killed. Billy is assigned to ride Joey into battle and is captured by German troops.

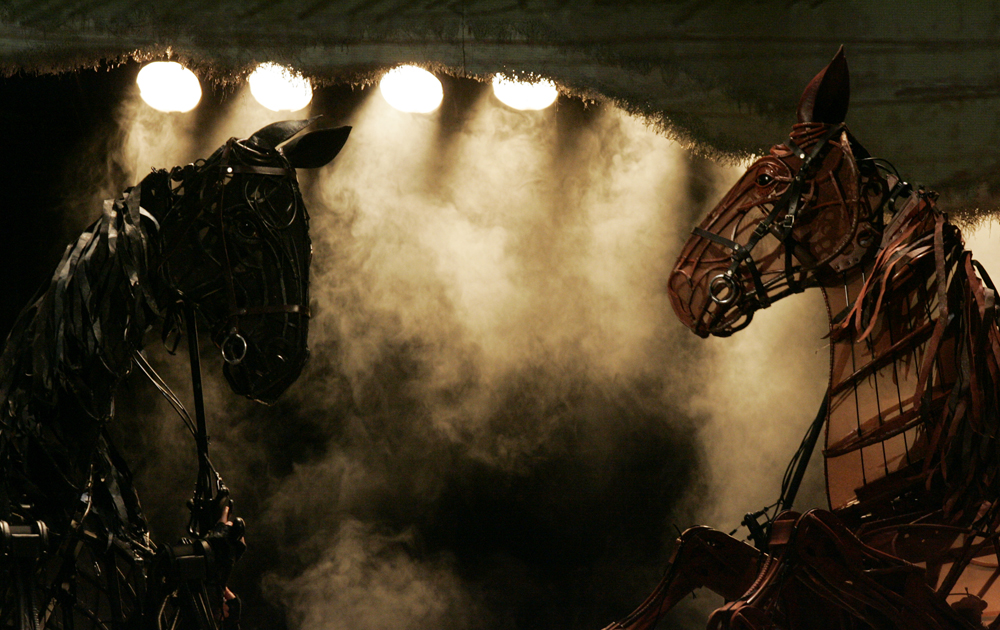
Topthorn and Joey, life-size puppet horses, at a production of the play in Australia

Nicholls's sketchbook is sent to Albert, who learns Joey is serving "unprotected" in France. He lies about his age, enlists in the army and goes to France. There he befriends Private David Taylor, a fellow soldier.

The Germans have taken Billy to a French farm being used as a makeshift hospital. He is killed brandishing his knife. Emilie, the girl of the farm family, is nearly killed in the altercation. German officer Friedrich Muller is reminded of his own daughter left in Germany. He and Emilie share a love of horses and, with Emilie's mother, they take care of the horses Joey and Topthorn, which are being kept to pull an ambulance for wounded soldiers.

When a shell kills most of his comrades, Friedrich switches his coat and identity with an enlisted medic, hoping to survive to return home. His subterfuge is discovered but Friedrich enables Emilie and her mother to escape. When the Germans force the two fine horses to work as draft horses, Joey inspires Topthorn to pull in order to survive. Once enemies, the two horses become friends, but Topthorn dies from exhaustion.

As Friedrich mourns the horse, a tank attack hits his group, killing him and causing Joey to flee in escape. He is caught in barbed wire in No Man's Land between the enemy lines. The Germans and British each send out a man under a white flag to aid the horse. Winning a coin toss, the British take the injured Joey back to camp.

Albert and David's infantry division encounter Emilie, who is alone and traumatized; they take her to British headquarters. On the way, Albert sees a dead horse with Billy's knife in him. Believing that the horse is Joey, Albert is broken. Recognizing Joey's name, Emilie tries to talk to Albert, but David is shot and killed, and Albert temporarily blinded by tear gas. Emilie does not have the chance to tell him about his horse.

Behind the lines, in a British encampment, Albert tells his story to a nurse just as the damaged Joey is brought to the camp by soldiers. The soldiers prepare to kill the injured horse, but Albert whistles and Joey responds to him. Learning the full story, the soldiers agree to let Albert care for Joey during their joint convalescence. The horse and farmboy return home safe to Devon at the end of the war.

== Productions ==
=== National Theatre (2007–2009) ===
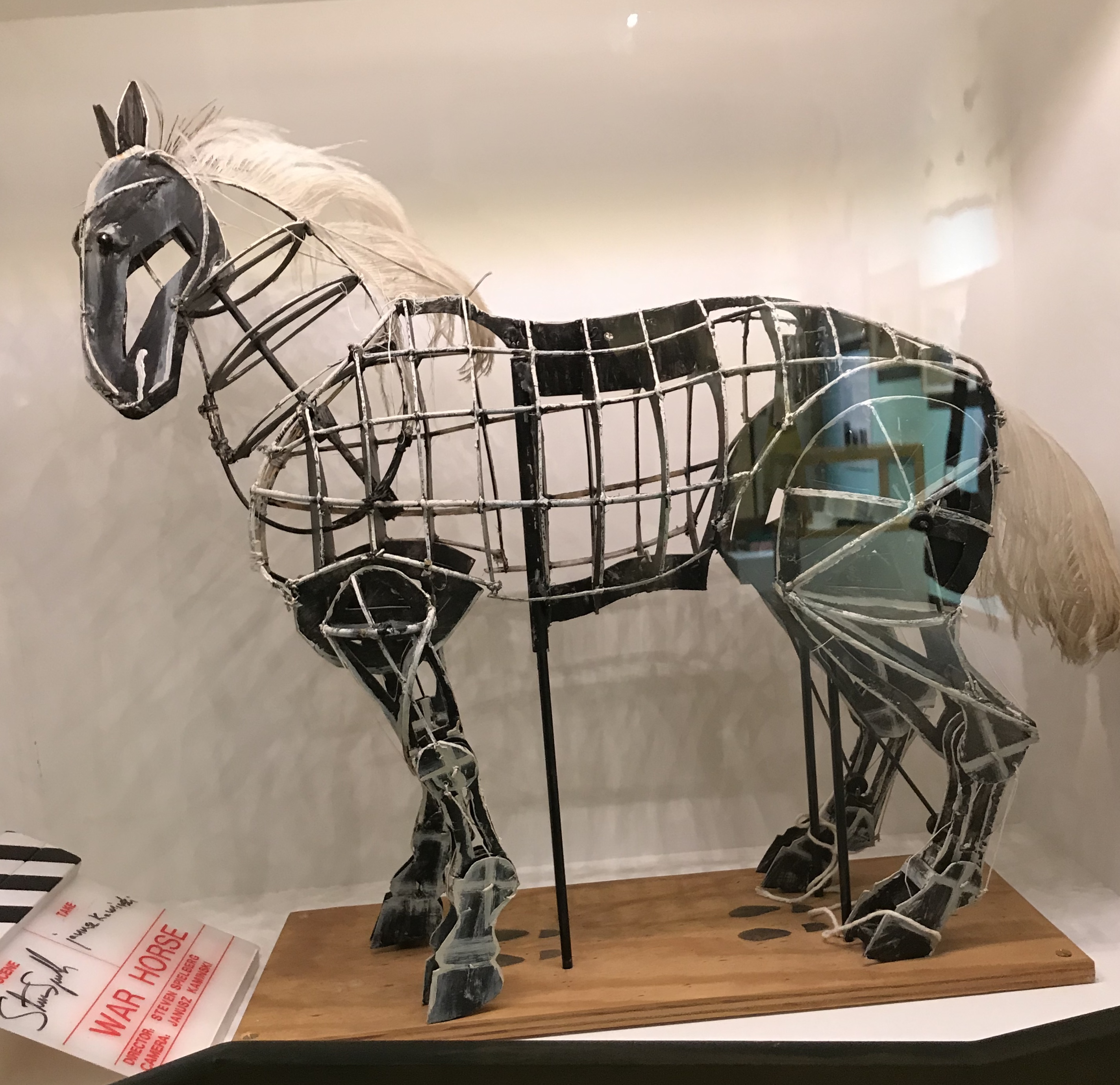
The maquette for Joey from the National Theatre production. The puppets were made by the Handspring Puppet Company of South Africa. This scale model was a gift to Michael Morpurgo

The show premiered on 17 October 2007 in the Olivier Theatre at the National Theatre on the South Bank, London, on a run that ended on 14 February 2008. It returned for a second run on 10 September 2008, and closed on 18 March 2009.

=== West End (2009–2016) ===
War Horse transferred to the West End's Gillian Lynne Theatre, beginning preview performances on 28 March 2009, prior to an official opening of 3 April. The original cast featured Kit Harington as Albert, who reprised his South Bank performance. The production includes an original score composed by Adrian Sutton.

The production met with critical acclaim for its powerful use of life-size horse puppets designed by the Handspring Puppet Company of South Africa, winning an Olivier Award, Evening Standard Theatre Award and Critics' Circle Theatre Award. On 12 October 2009 the performance was seen by HM Queen Elizabeth II and her husband Prince Philip, marking their first private theatre visit in four years.

War Horse has been popular with audiences, playing to 97% capacity in 2010, subsequently breaking the record for the highest weekly gross for a play in the West End. In December 2010, War Horse was dubbed "the theatrical event of the decade" by The Times. In 2011 it welcomed its millionth audience member.

War Horse was scheduled to close on 12 March 2016. By the time it closed, the play had played more than 3,000 performances.

=== Broadway (2011–2013) ===
As a co-production of the National Theatre and Lincoln Center Theater, War Horse began preview performances at Broadway's Vivian Beaumont Theater in New York City on 15 March 2011, and opened on officially 14 April. The British creative team are joined by an all-American cast. Seth Numrich starred as Albert, Matt Doyle as Billy and Stephen Plunkett as Lieutenant Nicholls. The production earned a strong critical reception and ticket sales, receiving five Tony Awards at the 2011 ceremony, including Best Play.

War Horse closed on 6 January 2013, after 718 performances and 33 previews.

=== Toronto, Canada (2012–2013) ===
The show opened a separate Canadian production in Toronto, Ontario, on 28 February 2012 at Mirvish Productions' Princess of Wales Theatre, following previews from 10 February. Alex Furber starred as Albert. The production closed on 6 January 2013.

=== US national tour (2012–2014) ===
The show's first national tour of the United States previewed at Boise State University's Morrison Center in Boise, Idaho, before launching at the Ahmanson Theatre in Los Angeles, California, from 14 June 2012 on a run through 29 July. It was scheduled for an additional 29 cities across the country. The role of Albert was played by Andrew Veenstra. This touring production played its final performance 24 August at Tokyo's Tokyu Theatre Orb, where the play had made its Asian premiere. Over 1.2 million audience members saw the first national tour of War Horse.

=== Australian Tour (2012–2013) and (2020) ===
The Australian premiere production began previews on 23 December 2012, prior to a 31 December opening night at the Arts Centre Melbourne. It played until 10 March 2013, ahead of dates in Sydney and Brisbane. An Auckland engagement was planned, but was cancelled due to low ticket sales. The role of Albert was played by Cody Fern.

The show also toured again in 2020, in Melbourne's Regent Theatre from 10 January to 8 February 2020, and in Sydney's Lyric Theatre from 15 February to 15 March 2020, and was due to play Perth's Crown Theatre from 24 March to 12 April 2020, but was cancelled due to Covid-19 pandemic.

=== First UK National Tour (2013–2014) ===
War Horse embarked on a UK Tour starting Autumn 2013. The tour played at the Theatre Royal, Plymouth (27 September to 12 October); the Birmingham Hippodrome (17 October to 9 November); the Lowry at Salford Quays (20 November – 18 January 2014); the Edinburgh Festival Theatre (22 January-15 February); the Southampton Mayflower (19 February-15 March); the Dublin Bord Gáis Energy Theatre (26 March – 26 April); the Sunderland Empire Theatre (30 April – 17 May); and finished in Cardiff at the Wales Millennium Centre (18 June – 19 July).

=== Berlin, Germany (2013–2014) ===
The first non-English-language production, entitled Gefährten (which loosely translates to Comrades, not coincidentally the same name given to the German release of Steven Spielberg's film), launched in Berlin, Germany, on 20 October 2013 at the Stage Theater des Westens. Marking the centenary of the first world war, War Horse is the first play about the war to be put on in Germany since that war began. It was produced in the same theatre attended by the Kaiser and Hitler. Someone called the play "the greatest anthem to peace" ever seen on the stage.

"An English play translated into German, it has a German cast, singing English folksongs in German...I was there on the first night in Berlin. It was a night to remember. A night I will never forget." --Michael Morpurgo

=== Netherlands (2014–2015) ===
The Dutch premiere of War Horse opened at Amsterdam's Theatre Carré on 30 May 2014, and ran through to 28 September 2014. After Amsterdam, War Horse toured to five further venues in Rotterdam, Breda, Groningen, Apeldoorn and Heerlen.

=== South Africa (2014–2015) ===
The South African premiere of War Horse (billed in some media as a 'homecoming') opened at the Teatro at Montecasino in Johannesburg on 22 October 2014, and played through to 30 November 2014. The South African tour concluded with a transfer to Cape Town's Artscape Opera House on 12 December, where it ran until 4 January 2015.

=== China (2015–16) ===
A Chinese adaptation of War Horse, entitled 战马, directed by Alex Sims and Li Dong, and fully translated into Mandarin, premiered at Beijing's National Theatre Company of China on 4 September 2015, and ran until 31 October. After the Beijing stop, the play toured to theatres in Shanghai (15 November 2015 – 17 January 2016), Guangzhou (8 March – 3 May 2016), as well as stops in Heilongjiang and Tianjin. Following the success of the first Chinese tour, the second tour began in Beijing in August 2016.

=== Further UK tours and London runs ===
A 10th Anniversary tour commenced in September 2017 at the Marlowe Theatre, Canterbury (15 September to 14 October) before heading to the Bristol Hippodrome (18 October to 11 November), Liverpool Empire (15 November to 2 December), New Theatre, Oxford (13 December to 6 January 2018), Brighton Centre (25 January to 10 February), Alhambra Theatre, Bradford (14 February to 10 March), Nottingham Royal Concert Hall (14 March to 7 April), Edinburgh Festival Theatre (18 April to 12 May), Southampton Mayflower Theatre (16 May to 9 June), The Lowry, Salford (13 to 30 June), Wales Millennium Centre, Cardiff (4 to 28 July), New Victoria Theatre, Woking (1 to 18 August), Plymouth Theatre Royal (29 August to 15 September), Milton Keynes Theatre (19 September to 6 October), Birmingham Hippodrome (10 October to 3 November) ending with a return to its original home at the National Theatre, London for a limited engagement from 8 November 2018 to 5 January 2019 to mark the centenary of the Armistice. The production played in the Lyttleton Theatre, opposed to its original stage – the Olivier, to comply with traditional touring logistics in a proscenium arch theatre.

The tour re-opened at Glasgow SEC (15 January to 2 February 2019) before touring to Sunderland Empire Theatre (6 to 23 February), Marlowe Theatre, Canterbury (27 February to 16 March), Regent Theatre, Stoke-on-Trent (27 March to 6 April), Bord Gáis Energy Theatre, Dublin (10 to 27 April), Liverpool Empire (31 July to 17 August 2019), New Theatre, Oxford (22 August to 7 September 2019), Curve, Leicester (18 September to 12 October 2019) before ending at another London run at the Troubadour Wembley Park Theatre from 18 October to 19 November 2019.

A third UK tour commenced at the New Wimbledon Theatre in London in September 2024, playing there for the first time, before returning to Salford, Southampton, Canterbury, Sunderland, Plymouth and Oxford.

Between 16 May and 30 July 2026, the play returns to its original home again at the National Theatre, London for another run in the Olivier Theatre.

=== Singapore (2020) ===
The Singapore premiere of War Horse, jointly presented by the Singapore Repertory Theatre and the Esplanade, was planned to commence on 24 April 2020 at the Esplanade – Theatres on the Bay and run through 3 May 2020. However, it has been cancelled due to the COVID-19 pandemic.

=== Film adaptation ===
Steven Spielberg directed the United States movie adaptation of War Horse, released on 25 December 2011, with a screenplay written by Richard Curtis and Lee Hall based on the novel. The film was shot entirely in England: in Devon, at Stratfield Saye in Berkshire, Wisley in Surrey, the Luton Hoo Estate in Bedfordshire, and at Castle Combe in Wiltshire. It was filmed naturalistically, with over 100 real horses (including 14 to portray Joey) and computer-generated imagery to support battle scenes.

=== War Horse at the Proms ===
On 3 August 2014 a special production of War Horse was presented at the Proms in the Royal Albert Hall, London, as Prom 22, with Adrian Sutton's music played by the BBC Concert Orchestra, and the cast and puppets of the show performing on stage. This was televised live by the BBC, and repeated on BBC on Boxing Day (26 December) 2014.

== In popular culture ==
Saturday Night Live spoofed War Horse on an episode aired 17 December 2011. The sketch features a British couple (played by Bill Hader and Kristen Wiig) attending a regional production of War Horse. Instead of a life-size horse puppet, the role of Joey is played by host Jimmy Fallon, who cavorts around the stage, slapping his legs in an imitation of hoofbeats, neighing, and eventually robot dancing.

Handspring Puppet Company artistic directors Basil Jones and Adrian Kohler appeared at the Long Beach TED Talk series in March 2011 to speak about their puppetry. In a highly popular segment, Jones and Kohler introduce the Handspring philosophy towards the 'life' of a puppet, before demonstrating their points with the help of the puppet Joey (performed by original National Theatre cast members Craig Leo and Tommy Luther and original West End cast member Mikey Brett). As Malone and Jackman observe:

As Joey tentatively enters the stage space, he is met with a spontaneous ovation sparked by the immediacy of the live moment, in turn aided by the fact that Kohler and Jones never stray from the game that dictates they treat him as a live horse. This playful notion helps Joey’s creators invite the audience to believe in his aliveness, and the audience succumbs, not only for his lifelike movement, but also for the way he is activated by those around him. As both creators and performers, Jones and Kohler soothe Joey’s "nervousness", and a planned moment when Joey "notices" the audience elicits a generous laugh. Joey shies, nervously clops his hooves, and nickers gently to demonstrate alarm. He sniffs Kohler’s jacket pocket, as he "knows" there is a snack in there. Later, when Jones crosses the stage to demonstrate a feature, he is careful not to walk behind Joey, lest he is kicked. The audience must believe he will not be kicked – only a spiteful puppeteer could activate such a trick – but Jones’s conviction that he should respect the animal’s space foregrounds the moment’s liveness and heightens the audience’s engagement. Finally, a jockey is introduced, and Joey patiently holds still while he is mounted. Joey accepts the rider’s weight without complaint, comfortably parades around the stage, and swiftly exits before the effect is mundane. For the entire time that Joey inhabits the stage, the audience is noticeably spellbound.

In October 2021, the Handspring puppet Little Amal was met on the South Bank in London by Joey the War Horse, and they continued the walk together.

== Critical reception ==
The Guardian's Michael Billington wrote in his review:

Elliott and Morris recreate the kaleidoscopic horror of war through bold imagery, including the remorseless advance of a manually operated tank, and through the line-drawings of Rae Smith projected on to a suspended screen. Admittedly the performers are somewhat eclipsed by the action ... The joy of the evening, however, lies in the skilled recreation of equine life and in its unshaken belief that mankind is ennobled by its love of the horse.

Charles Spencer in The Daily Telegraph had written that, generally, "puppets are often an embarrassment, involving a lot of effort and fuss for negligible returns"; in this case, he praised the puppetry as "truly magnificent creations by the Handspring Puppet Company." The Times' 10-year-old guest reviewer called the show "movingly and realistically brought to life" and "an emotional and compelling adaptation of the book."

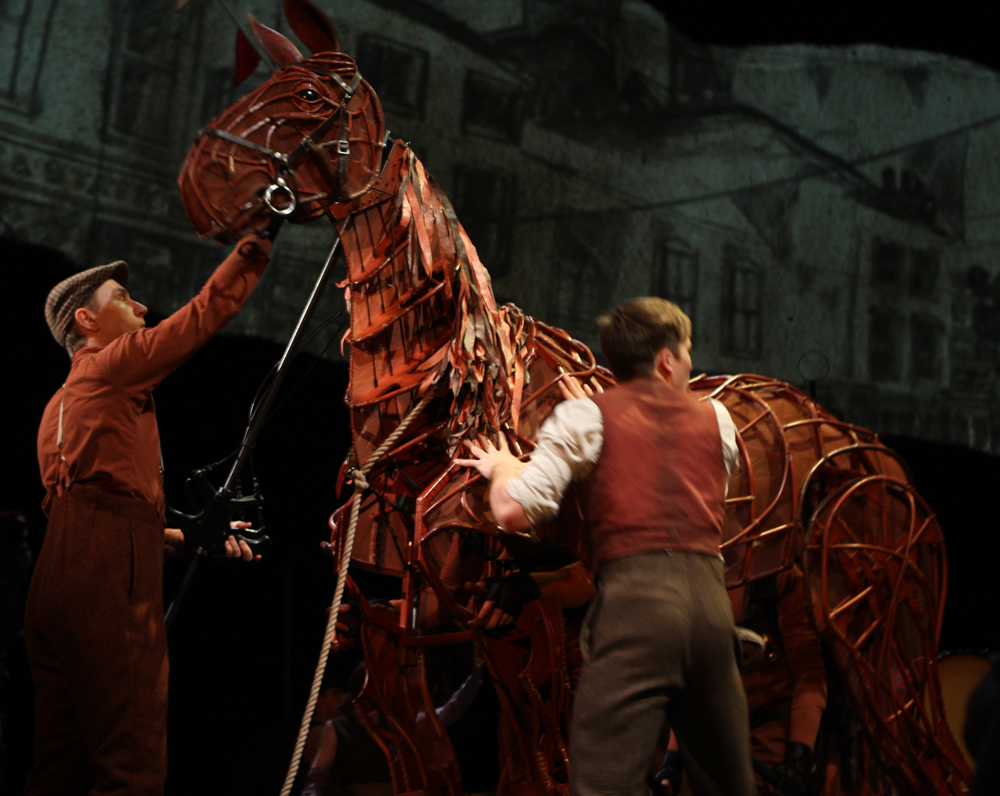
Joey and members of the cast at a production of the play in Australia

In reviewing the Broadway production, Ben Brantley wrote in The New York Times, "...it is how Joey is summoned into being, along with an assortment of other animals, that gives this production its ineffably theatrical magic...Beautifully designed by Rae Smith ... and Paule Constable, this production is also steeped in boilerplate sentimentality. Beneath its exquisite visual surface, it keeps pushing buttons like a sales clerk in a notions shop." Brantley suggests,

"The implicit plea not to be forgotten applies not just to the villagers, soldiers and horses portrayed here, but also to theater, as an evanescent art that lives on only in audiences' memories. Judged by that standard, much of War Horse evaporates not long after it ends. But I would wager that for a good while, you’ll continue to see Joey in your dreams."

Entertainment Weekly gave a positive review, calling the show an

"imaginative, moving new Broadway drama ... The play's equine stars are the remarkable creation of Adrian Kohler and Basil Jones' Handspring Puppet Company. As manipulated by three handlers dressed in period costumes, the life-size creatures seem to breathe, snort, feed, walk, gallop, and rear up just as naturally as the genuine articles. In no time at all, they become characters as rounded and complex as any of the humans on stage."

Time magazine ranked the play as its top choice among all theatre productions in 2011.

The Wall Street Journal's Terry Teachout praised the puppetry, but gave mixed reactions to the play:

"The fundamental flaw of 'War Horse' is that Nick Stafford, who wrote the script 'in association' (that's how the credit reads) with South Africa's Handspring Puppet Company, has taken a book that was written for children and tried to give it the expressive weight of a play for adults. Not surprisingly, Mr. Morpurgo's plot can't stand the strain. Dramatic situations that work perfectly well in the context of the book play like Hollywood clichés onstage. In the first act, the craftsmanship is so exquisite that this doesn't matter—much—but things go downhill fast after intermission. The really big problem is the last scene, about which, once again, the drama critics' code commands silence. This much must be said, though: A play that is so forthright about the horrors of war owes its audience a more honest ending."

Theatre review aggregator Curtain Critic gave the production a score of 88 out of 100 based on the opinions of 21 critics.

== Awards and nominations ==
=== London production ===
2007 Evening Standard Awards

- Best Director (Marianne Elliott and Tom Morris, nominee)
- Best Design (Rae Smith and the Handspring Puppet Company, winner)

2007 Critics' Circle Theatre Awards

- Best Designer (Basil Jones, Adrian Kohler, Rae Smith, and the Handspring Puppet Company, winner)

2008 Laurence Olivier Awards

- Best New Play (nominee)
- Best Lighting Design (Paule Constable, nominee)
- Best Sound Design (Adrian Sutton and John Tams, nominee)
- Best Set Design (Rae Smith, Basil Jones and Adrian Kohler, winner)
- Best Theatre Choreographer (Toby Sedgwick, winner)
- Best Director (Marianne Elliott and Tom Morris, nominee)

2010 Laurence Olivier Awards

- Audience Award for Most Popular Show (nominee)

2012 TheatrePeople.com Awards

- Nominated for 'Favourite Play' and 'Favourite Family Show'

=== Broadway production ===
2011 Drama League Awards

- Distinguished Production of a Play (winner)
- Distinguished Performance (Seth Numrich, nominee)

2011 Tony Awards

- Best Play (winner)
- Best Direction of a Play (Marianne Elliott and Tom Morris, winner)
- Best Scenic Design of a Play (Rae Smith, winner)
- Best Lighting Design of a Play (Paule Constable, winner)
- Best Sound Design of a Play (Christopher Shutt, winner)

In addition, Adrian Kohler and Basil Jones of Handspring Puppet Company won the Special Tony Award for War Horse.

2011 Drama Desk Awards

- Outstanding Play (winner)

2011 New York Drama Critics' Circle Awards

- Best Foreign Play (runner-up)
- Special Citation (direction, design and puppetry of War Horse)

2011 Outer Critics Circle Awards

- Outstanding New Broadway Play (winner)
- Outstanding Director of a Play (Marianne Elliott and Tom Morris, winner)
- Outstanding Lighting Design (Paule Constable, winner)
- Outstanding Featured Actor in a Play (Seth Numrich, nominee)

In addition, Adrian Kohler and Basil Jones of Handspring Puppet Company won the Outer Critics Circle Special Achievement Award, for "Puppet Design, Fabrication and Direction for War Horse".

2011 Fred & Adele Astaire Awards

- Best Broadway Choreographer (Toby Sedgwick, nominee)

== General ==
Malone, Toby, and Christopher J. Jackman. Adapting War Horse: Cognition, the Spectator, and a Sense of Play. London: Palgrave Macmillan, 2016.

Millar, Mervyn. The Horse's Mouth: Staging Morpurgo's War Horse . London: Oberon Books, 2008.
