= Private Romeo =

- Theatrical release poster
- Directed by: Alan Brown
- Screenplay by: Alan Brown
- Based on: Romeo and Juliet by William Shakespeare
- Produced by: Agathe David-Weill; Kevin Ginty; Alan Brown
- Starring: Seth Numrich; Matt Doyle
- Cinematography: Derek McKane
- Music by: Nicholas Wright
- Release date: June 20, 2011 (Frameline)
- Country: United States
- Language: English

Private Romeo is an adaptation of William Shakespeare's Romeo and Juliet by Alan Brown made in 2011. The film is a reenactment of the play exclusively spoken in an all-male high school military academy called McKinley Military Academy. Amidst this recitation is a love blossoming between the two cadets, Sam Singleton / Romeo played by Seth Numrich and Glenn Mangan / Juliet played by Matt Doyle. The film was Brown's take on Don't ask, don't tell, the official United States policy on gays in the military from December 21, 1993, to September 20, 2011 (the law was repealed after the production of the film).

The scenes of the cadet school and the lessons of the play Romeo and Juliet are filmed in desaturated colors, gray, khaki, and pale, whereas the scenes depicting the actual Shakespearean scenes are shown in saturated colors.

The film project was previously known as "McKinley" and as "The Shakespeare Project".

Brown was inspired to write the script after seeing Joe Calarco's play Shakespeare's R&J in 2008 wherein four senior students in blazers, discover Shakespeare's Romeo and Juliet and become intrigued by it while reciting excerpts, and act out key scenes from the play intermingled with their own personal realities. All four play various roles in a minimalist stage setting.

== Cast ==
The cast was made up of 8 actors playing 11 characters. Many other characters from the original play were left out.

- Seth Numrich as Sam Singleton (Romeo)
- Matt Doyle as Glenn Mangan (Juliet)
- Hale Appleman as Josh Neff (double role Mercutio and Lord Capulet)
- Charlie Barnett as Ken Lee (Prince Escalus)
- Adam Barrie as Adam Hersh (Friar Laurence)
- Chris Bresky as Omar Madsen (Nurse)
- Sean Hudock as Gus Sanchez (double role Capulet's Wife and Benvolio)
- Bobby Moreno as Carlos Moreno (double role of Capulet and Tybalt)

== Reception ==
On the review aggregator website Rotten Tomatoes, 55% of 11 reviews are positive, with an average rating of 5.0/10. Metacritic, which uses a weighted average, assigned the film a score of 53 out of 100 based on 7 critics, indicating "mixed or average reviews". Rex Reed, writing for the Observer, described it as "hugely adventurous and highly liberated". It was a New York Times Critics Pick.

== Awards ==
In 2011, the film won the Grand Jury Prize at Outfest, the Los Angeles Gay and Lesbian Film Festival, for "Outstanding Actor in a Feature Film." The prize was co-won by Seth Numrich, Chris Bresky, Matt Doyle, Hale Appleman, Sean Hudock, Adam Barrie, Bobby Moreno, and Charlie Barnett. The award credited the actors for "bringing fresh life to a timeless love story and infusing each moment with a 21st century immediacy that balances naked passion with longing and delivering it all with brilliant coherence".
