= Seth Numrich =

American stage, film / TV actor (born 1987)

- Born: January 19, 1987 (age 39); Minneapolis, Minnesota, US
- Education: Juilliard School (BFA)
- Occupation: Actor
- Years active: 2005–present
- Known for: Turn: Washington's Spies

Seth Numrich (/ˈnuːmrɪk/ NOOM-rik; born January 19, 1987) is an American stage, television, and film actor.

== Early life ==
Numrich was born on January 19, 1987 in Minneapolis, Minnesota. His father, Charles Numrich, is an actor who in 1981 founded the non-profit theatre company Creative Theater Unlimited, which he ran until 2008.

Numrich earned his Bachelor of Fine Arts (BFA) degree at The Juilliard School in New York City, graduating in acting in 2006 with Group 36. At the time, he was the youngest person to be admitted into Juilliard's Drama Division, a record previously held by actor Val Kilmer.

== Career ==
Numrich was a teaching artist for Artists Striving to End Poverty from 2005 to 2012.

=== Theatre ===
Numrich made his Broadway debut as Lorenzo in the 2010 revival of The Merchant of Venice and has played the boxer Joe Bonaparte in Golden Boy and as Albert in War Horse both at the Lincoln Center Theater on Broadway. He has also acted Off-Broadway in Slipping, Yosemite and Blind as part of Rattlestick Playwrights Theater program, in Too Much Memory, Favorites and Break Your Face on My Hand with Rising Phoenix Repertory, and On the Levee and Iphigenia 2.0 with Signature Theatre. Other roles include Gates of Gold with 59E59 Theaters and Dutch Masters with LAByrinth Theater Company and regionally in The History Boys, The Cure at Troy, Measure for Measure and The Judgment of Paris.

In 2013, he starred in Sweet Bird of Youth by Tennessee Williams opposite Kim Cattrall at The Old Vic in the West End, London. In 2018, Numrich appeared in Tom Stoppard's Travesties on Broadway with the Roundabout Theatre Company. In 2022, he appeared in the Broadway premiere of Stoppard's Leopoldstadt. In 2023, Numrich performed in Irish Repertory Theatre's staging of Brian Friel's Translations, and in 2024 Numrich performed in the world premiere of J. T. Rogers' Corruption at Lincoln Center Theater.

Currently Numrich is playing Blaine Shaw in the Netflix series "The Boroughs" (2026).

=== Film and television ===
Numrich performed the lead role as cadet Sam Singleton/Romeo in Private Romeo, a 2011 film adaptation of Shakespeare's Romeo and Juliet directed by Alan Brown. Collectively with five other actors from the film, he won the Outstanding Actor in a Feature Film award at L.A. Outfest in 2011.

Other roles for Numrich include Benjamin Tallmadge in AMC's series Turn: Washington's Spies (2014 to 2017) and Robin Lafferty in the miniseries Under the Banner of Heaven.

=== Audiobooks ===
Numrich has read two Stephen King novels as unabridged audio productions: Later (2021) and Fairy Tale (2022).

== Credits ==
=== Theatre ===
| Year | Production | Role | Notes |
|---|---|---|---|
| 2010 | The Merchant of Venice | Lorenzo | Broadhurst Theatre |
| 2011 | War Horse | Albert | Lincoln Center Theater |
| 2012 | Golden Boy | Joe Bonaparte | Lincoln Center Theater at the Belasco Theatre |
| 2013 | Sweet Bird of Youth | Chance Wayne | The Old Vic |
| 2018 | Travesties | Tristan Tzara | Roundabout Theatre Company |
| 2022 | Leopoldstadt | Jacob / Percy | Longacre Theatre |
| 2024 | Corruption | James Murdoch | Lincoln Center Theater |

Selected Off-Broadway and regional credits include:

Theatre (Off-Broadway)

- Rattlestick Playwrights Theater
  - Slipping
  - Yosemite
  - Afghanistan Zimbabwe America Kuwait
  - Blind
- Rising Phoenix Repertory:
  - Too Much Memory
  - Favorites
  - Break Your Face on My Hand
- Signature Theatre Company
  - On the Levee
  - Iphigenia 2.0
- 59E59 Theaters
  - Gates of Gold
- LAByrinth Theater Company
  - Dutch Masters
- Irish Repertory Theatre
  - Translations

Regional Theatre, International Theatre

- The History Boys as Dakin (Ahmanson Theatre)
- The Cure at Troy as Neoptolemus (Seattle Repertory Theatre)
- Measure for Measure as Duke (Chautauqua Theatre Company)
- The Judgment of Paris (NYC Fringe Festival / Edinburgh Fringe Festival)
- The Glass Menagerie (Edinburgh International Festival)

=== On-screen ===
Film

- 2002: How to Kill a Mockingbird as Kevin
- 2011: Private Romeo as Sam Singleton / Romeo
- 2016: Macbeth: Unhinged as Macduff
- 2016: Imperium as Roy

Television

- 2010: Gravity as Adam Rosenblum
- 2012: The Good Wife as Randy Chapman in episode "Here Comes the Judge"
- 2014–2017: Turn: Washington's Spies as Benjamin Tallmadge
- 2017: Homeland as Nate Joseph
- 2019: Madam Secretary as Griffin
- 2022: Under the Banner of Heaven as Robin Lafferty
- 2026: The Boroughs as Blaine Shaw

Voice-Over

- 2008/2010: Independent Lens in episode "Blessed Is the Match: The Life and Death of Hannah Senesh" as voice of Giora Senesh/Sándor Fleischmann (in 2008 documentary film and 2010 TV documentary series)
