= Madame Bovary (2000 TV series) =

- Genre: Costume drama
- Based on: Madame Bovary by Gustave Flaubert
- Written by: Heidi Thomas
- Directed by: Tim Fywell
- Starring: Frances O'Connor; Hugh Bonneville; Greg Wise; Hugh Dancy
- Composer: John Lunn
- Country of origin: United Kingdom
- Original language: English
- No. of series: 1
- No. of episodes: 2

Production
- Executive producers: Hillary Salmon; David M. Thompson; Rebecca Eaton
- Producers: Tony Redston; Bernard Krichefski
- Production locations: Ashridge Park, Little Gaddesden, Hertfordshire, England, UK; France
- Running time: 150 minutes
- Production company: WGBH productions for BBC

Original release
- Network: WGBH-TV
- Release: 6 February – 13 February 2000
- Network: BBC Two
- Release: 10 April – 11 April 2000

Madame Bovary is a 2000 British drama directed by Tim Fywell and based on the 1857 novel of the same name by French author Gustave Flaubert. It was broadcast in two parts on 6 and 13 February in the U.S.A on WGBH-TV and on 10 and 11 April in the United Kingdom on BBC Two.

== Cast ==
- Frances O'Connor as Emma Bovary
- Hugh Bonneville as Charles Bovary
- Eileen Atkins as Marie Louise
- Hugh Dancy as Leon Dupuis

== Reception ==
The drama was nominated for British Academy Television Awards for best costume design and for best make-up and hair design. Frances O'Connor was nominated for a Golden Globe Award for Best Actress – Miniseries or Television Film.
