= Oliver Parker =

British film director and screenwriter

- Born: 6 September 1960 (age 65); London, England
- Occupations: Screenwriter, director, producer, actor
- Years active: 1987–present

Oliver Parker (born 6 September 1960) is a British film director, screenwriter, and former actor. He is known for writing and directing the film adaptations of Shakespeare's Othello (1995) and Wilde's The Importance of Being Earnest (2002), and for his role as Peloquin in the cult film Nightbreed (1990).

== Biography ==
Parker was born in Plymouth, the second of three sons of Jillian, Lady Parker, a writer and GP (general practitioner), and Sir Peter Parker, formerly chairman of British Rail.

His brothers include the public relations executive Sir Alan Parker (born 1956) and the actor Nathaniel Parker (born 1962). They also have a sister, Lucy.

== Filmography ==
=== Films and Television ===
| Year | Film | Director | Producer | Writer | Other | Notes |
|---|---|---|---|---|---|---|
| 1987 | Hellraiser | | | | Yes | Actor: "Moving Man 2" |
| 1988 | Hellbound: Hellraiser II | | | | Yes | Actor: "Workman 2" |
| 1990 | Nightbreed | | | | Yes | Actor: "Peloquin" |
| 1990 | Nuns on the Run | | | | Yes | Actor: "Doctor" |
| 1993 | Shepherd on the Rock | | | | Yes | Actor: "Simon McIntyre" |
| 1994 | Murder in Belgravia: The Lucan Affair | | | | Yes | Actor: "Lord Lucan"; Television movie |
| 1995 | Othello | Yes | | Yes | | |
| 1995 | The Big Game | | | | Yes | Actor: "Charles Harman"; Television movie |
| 1999 | An Ideal Husband | Yes | | Yes | Yes | Actor: "Bunbury" |
| 2001 | Zoe | | | | Yes | Actor: "Julian" |
| 2002 | The Importance of Being Earnest | Yes | | Yes | | |
| 2003 | The Private Life of Samuel Pepys | Yes | | | | Television movie |
| 2006 | Fade to Black | Yes | | Yes | | |
| 2007 | I Really Hate My Job | Yes | | | | |
| 2007 | St Trinian's | Yes | Yes | | | |
| 2009 | Dorian Gray | Yes | | | | |
| 2009 | St Trinian's 2: The Legend of Fritton's Gold | Yes | Yes | | | |
| 2011 | Johnny English Reborn | Yes | | | | |
| 2016 | Dad's Army | Yes | | | Yes | Lyrics: "Auf Wiedersehen Mr Hitler" |
| 2018 | Swimming with Men | Yes | | | | |
| 2023 | The Great Escaper | Yes | | | | |
| 2023 | Funny Woman | Yes | | | | |
| TBA | Pure | Yes | | | | |

=== Television (as actor) ===
- Matlock (1 episode, 1987) – Man at Butler's School
- The Bill (1 episode, 1989) - Glen Phelps
- Agatha Christie's Poirot (The Million Dollar Bond Robbery, 1991) - Philip Ridgeway
- Casualty (18 episodes, 1993-94) - Mark Calder
- Lovejoy (Day of Reckoning, 1994) - Desmond Dexter
