= Matt Doyle (actor) =

American actor and singer (born 1987)

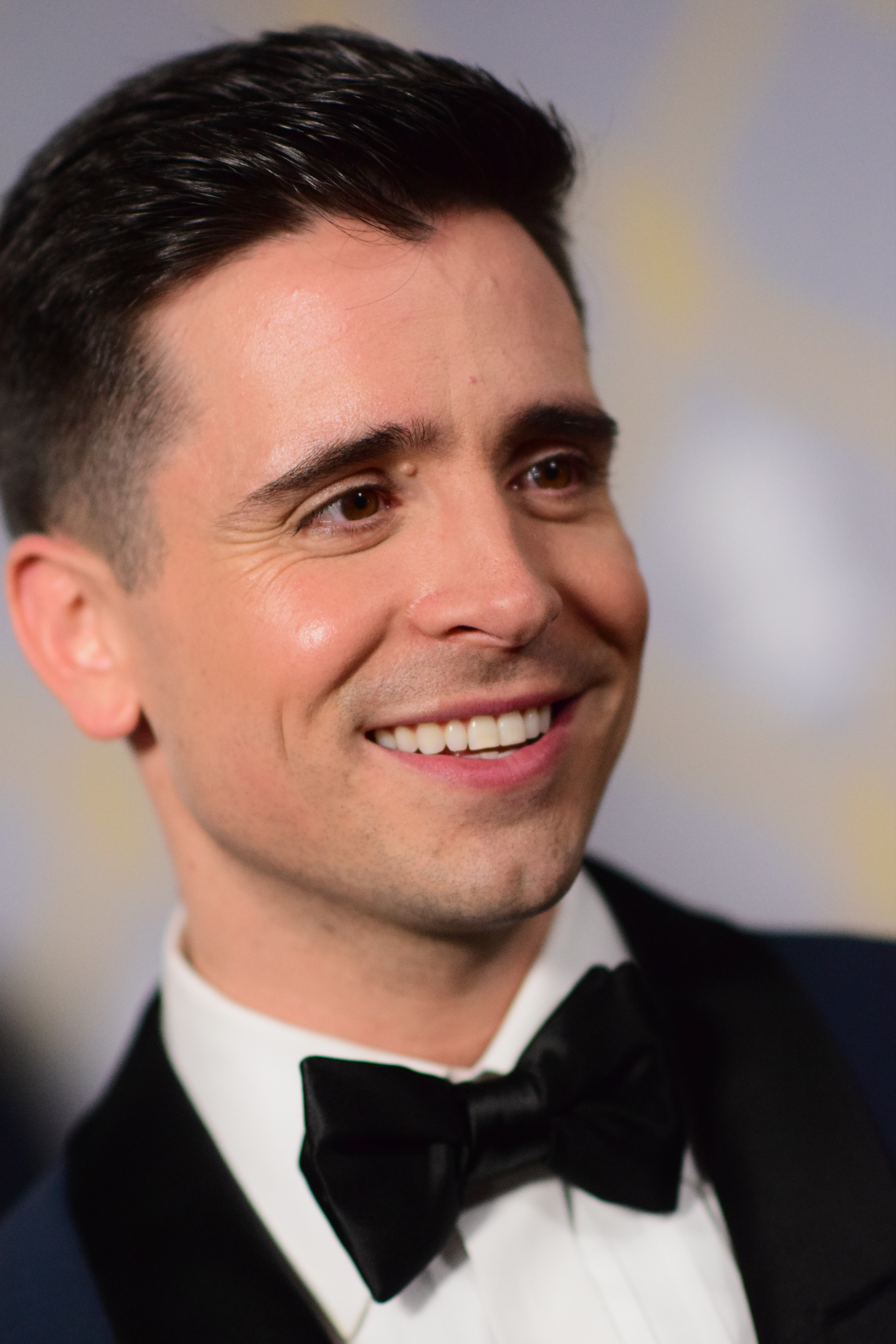
- Doyle in June 2022
- Born: Matthew Finnen Doyle; May 13, 1987 (age 39)
- Education: London Academy of Music and Dramatic Art
- Occupations: Actor, singer
- Years active: 2006–present
- Website: mattdoylemusic.com

Matthew Finnen Doyle (born May 13, 1987) is an American actor and singer known for his work in musical theatre. He made his Broadway debut in 2007 in Spring Awakening as a replacement for the roles of Hanschen and Melchior. He later had supporting roles in the Broadway productions of Bye Bye Birdie in 2009 and War Horse in 2011. He joined Broadway's The Book of Mormon in 2012, replacing Nic Rouleau as the starring role of Elder Price. Following a period of performing Off-Broadway and regionally, which included starring as Anthony Hope in the 2017 Off-Broadway revival of Sweeney Todd: The Demon Barber of Fleet Street. He joined the Broadway transfer of the gender-swapped production of Company in 2021 playing the role of Jamie originated by Jonathan Bailey in the West End. For his performance, he won the Tony Award for Best Featured Actor in a Musical. In 2022, he returned to the Off-Broadway stage as Seymour Krelborn in the revival of Little Shop of Horrors.

As singer-songwriter, Doyle performs in live shows and has released two EPs, namely, Daylight (2011) and Constant (2012). He released his first full-length album, Uncontrolled in 2016.

== Early life and education ==
Doyle grew up in Weston, Connecticut, before moving to Northern California in his adolescence. After graduating from Redwood High School in Larkspur, California, Doyle went on to train in the London Academy of Music and Dramatic Art for a year.

== Career ==
Doyle made his Broadway debut in 2007, at age twenty, as a stand-by in the original Broadway production of Spring Awakening. Following original cast member Jonathan B. Wright's departure, he was promoted to the role of Hanschen until the show closed in January 2009.

In 2009, he portrayed Hugo Peabody in the revival of Bye Bye Birdie. In 2011, he appeared as Billy Naracott (understudying Albert) in Lincoln Center Theater's production of War Horse. Following War Horse, he starred as Elder Price in the Broadway production of Book of Mormon from November 2012 to January 2014.

On screen, Doyle played Jonathan, Eric van der Woodsen's boyfriend, on CW show Gossip Girl. He also starred in Alan Brown's adaptation of Romeo and Juliet, Private Romeo, and had a small singing role in the 2009 film, Once More with Feeling.

In addition to his roles on Broadway and on screen, Doyle has starred in numerous off-Broadway and regional productions. He starred as Anthony in Barrow Street Theatre's production of Sweeney Todd, in West Side Story at the Paper Mill Playhouse, Ryan Scott Oliver's Jasper in Deadland at the West End Theatre in New York and the 5th Avenue Theatre in Seattle, Brooklynite at the Vineyard Theatre, the musical Giant in Dallas, and the 2017 stage adaptation of A Clockwork Orange at New World Stages. He also appeared as Peter on a recording of Bare: A Pop Opera.

Doyle is also a singer-songwriter. He released his first EP, Daylight, in 2011, with a follow-up EP in 2012, Constant. He released his first full-length album, Uncontrolled, in 2016. Doyle's writing partner is musical theatre composer, Will Van Dyke. Doyle created a web comic, Dents, with childhood friend, Beth Behrs in 2017.

In 2020, Doyle was cast in the gender-bent Broadway revival of Company as Jamie, a role originated and first performed as a man by Jonathan Bailey in the West End. In 2022, he won a Tony Award for Best Featured Actor in a Musical for his performance.

Doyle frequently performs solo shows and alongside other Broadway performers at New York venues such as 54 Below and Joe's Pub. He streams on Twitch.

In September 2023, Doyle starred as Frank Sinatra in the world premiere production of Sinatra: The Musical at the Birmingham Repertory Theatre in Birmingham, England.

== Personal life ==
Doyle is gay. He lives in Jersey City, New Jersey. He began dating fellow Broadway actor Max Clayton in 2015, and they got engaged in 2023. As of late 2024, Doyle is single.

== Awards and nominations ==
Year	Award	Category	Nominated work	Result	Ref.
2022	Tony Award	Best Featured Actor in a Musical	Company	Won	
2022	Drama League Award	Distinguished Performance	Company	Nominated	
2022	Outer Critics Circle Award	Outstanding Featured Actor in a Musical	Company	Won	
2022	Drama Desk Award	Outstanding Featured Actor in a Musical	Company	Won	

== Discography ==
Solo album

- 2016: Uncontrolled

With The Whiskey 5

- 2014: Make the Season Bright

Extended plays

- 2012: Constant (EP)
- 2011: Daylight (EP)

Cast recordings / anthologies

- 2017: Bubble Boy
- 2016: Jasper in Deadland
- 2011: Our First Mistake
- 2010: Thirteen Stories Down
- 2010: (Sorta) Love Songs
- 2007: bare: A Pop Opera

== Acting credits ==
=== Film ===
Year	Title	Role	Notes	Ref.
2009	Once More with Feeling	Young Nonno		
2011	Private Romeo	Glenn Mangan / Juliet		

=== Television ===
Year	Title	Role	Notes	Ref.
2008–2011	Gossip Girl	Jonathan Whitney	8 episodes	
2015	For Real	Alex Merrick	Television film	
2016	Truth Slash Fiction	Tommy	Television film	
2019	The Code	Lt. Goodacre	Episode: "Above the Knee"	
2023	Gossip Girl	Jonathan Whitney	Episode: "I Am Gossip"	

=== Theatre ===
Year	Title	Role	Venue	Notes
2006	The Butcherhouse Chronicles		The Public Theater	Summer Play Festival
2007–2009	Spring Awakening	Swing (u/s: Melchior, Hanschen, Otto, Georg, Ernst)	Eugene O'Neill Theatre	Broadway replacement
2007–2009	Spring Awakening	Hanschen	Eugene O'Neill Theatre	Broadway replacement
2007–2009	Spring Awakening	Melchior (alternate)	Eugene O'Neill Theatre	Broadway replacement
2007–2009	Spring Awakening	Melchior	Eugene O'Neill Theatre	Broadway replacement
2009	Picnic at Hanging Rock		Eugene O'Neill Theater Center	Regional
2009–2010	Bye Bye Birdie	Hugo Peabody / TV Quartet	Henry Miller's Theatre	Broadway revival
2011-2012	War Horse	Billy Narracott (u/s: Albert Narracott)	Vivian Beaumont Theater	Broadway transfer
2012	Giant	Jordy Jr.	Dallas Theater Center	Regional
2012–2014	The Book of Mormon	Elder Kevin Price	Eugene O'Neill Theatre	Broadway replacement
2014–2015	Jasper in Deadland	Jasper	West End Theatre	Off-off-Broadway
2014–2015	Jasper in Deadland	Jasper	5th Avenue Theatre	Regional
2015	Brooklynite	Trey Swieskowski	Vineyard Theatre	Off-Broadway
2015	Grey Gardens	Joseph Patrick Kennedy, Jr., Jerry	Bay Street Theatre	Regional
2016	West Side Story	Tony	Paper Mill Playhouse	Regional
2017	Sweeney Todd: The Demon Barber of Fleet Street	Anthony Hope	Barrow Street Theatre	Off-Broadway
2017	A Clockwork Orange	Georgie	New World Stages	Off-Broadway
2018	The Secret Garden	Captain Albert Lennox	Unknown	Pre-Broadway Lab
2018	The Heart of Rock & Roll	Bobby	Old Globe Theatre	Regional
2020–2022	Company	Jamie	Bernard B. Jacobs Theatre	Broadway transfer
2022-2023	Little Shop of Horrors	Seymour Krelborn	Westside Theatre	Off-Broadway Replacement
2023	Sinatra: The Musical	Frank Sinatra	Birmingham Repertory Theatre	Regional
2024	Sinatra: The Musical	Frank Sinatra	Apollo Theatre	Concert
2024	My Best Friend's Wedding	Michael	Ogunquit Playhouse	Regional
2025	Conversations with Mother	Bobby	Theater555	Off-Broadway
2025	The Great Gatsby	Jay Gatsby	GS Arts Center	South Korea
2026	When Playwrights Kill	Jack Hawkins	Huntington Theatre Company	Regional
2026	Hello, Dolly!	Cornelius Hackl	Ogunquit Playhouse	Regional
2026	Something Rotten!	Nick Bottom	The Muny	Regional
