= Alex Furber =

Canadian actor

Alexander John Wylie Furber (born February 20, 1987) is a Canadian actor, known for starring in the role of Albert in the Toronto production of War Horse.

== Early life ==
Alex Furber grew up in Scarborough, east of downtown Toronto. He is the eldest child of Sandra and John Furber. His sister Janelle is a graduate of U of T, while his younger sister Shelby is a fashion model. He attended Royal St. George's middle school, Trinity College School, and the National Theatre School of Canada.

== Stage acting career ==
Year	Production	Role	Venue
2017	My Night With Reg	Eric	Panasonic Theatre
2016	Jitters	Tom	Young Centre for the Performing Arts
2015	Anne and Gilbert: The Musical	Gilbert	National Arts Centre
2014	The Lion in Winter	Prince John	Watermark Theatre, Rustico, PEI
2012-13	War Horse	Albert Narracott	Royal Alexandra Theatre
