= Rental family service =

Service providing actors to portray friends or family

A rental family service (レンタル家族) or professional stand-in service provides clients with actors who portray friends, family members, or coworkers for social events such as weddings, or to provide platonic companionship. The service was first offered in Japan during the early 1990s.

== History ==
The earliest known rental family service was offered by Japan Efficiency Corporation (Nihon Kokasei Honbu) starting in the fall of 1991. Japan Efficiency, run by Satsuki Oiwa, was started in 1987 to train corporate employees, but after hearing complaints about unsatisfactory relationships, began to also offer professional actors for "soft service — reaching others with a sympathetic heart". By May 1992, Japan Efficiency had a roster of 21 clients, a waiting list of 84 more, and more than 400 applicants for professional stand-ins.

Human love is basic to any society, but it is forgotten here [in Japan]. [...] Japan has been a country where adults express their love with material gifts. We in our thirties and forties were children who received love in the form of things. We did the same to our children once we became parents. What happened in the nineteen eighties? Among other things, people realized material goods alone don't make them happy. They have begun to see what they've forgotten—or what they never had. They don't know what to do about it yet. They're not sure. But renting a family is one of the things they've done.

— Oiwa Satsuki, founder and CEO, Japan Efficiency Corporation, Japan: A Reinterpretation

Some of the rental family agencies felt the services offered were uniquely suited to aspects of Japanese culture such as saving face and social etiquette, but the practice has since spread to other countries. Wedding guest rentals started in the late 1990s in South Korea, which offers a similar cultural desire to offer a public image of doing well. Korean rental services expanded to broader roles in the 2000s. In 2007, the Super-grandparents site was created in France to match children with surrogate grandparents for terms varying from one month to one year. After reading a 2009 news article regarding the service, Scott Rosenbaum founded the United States-based Rent-a-Friend in October 2009, a worldwide service which provides paying subscribers with contact information for local platonic companions who can be hired at rates set by the companion.

There is something in Japanese culture about people’s excessive concern for appearances and how they are seen by others. And often there is this idea that there is a single common sense and nothing else. [...] People who come to us often have no one else to ask. We are their last resort. There are times when I ask myself, What will happen if I don’t help this person? Maybe it will just result in some short-lived embarrassment, or perhaps the damage will be deeper, rippling through their life.

— Ichinokawa Ryuichi, founder and president of Hagemashi-tai, 2017 interview with Pavel Alpayev

By 2009, there were around ten rental family service agencies in Japan. In 2010, CNN reported that some Chinese companies were hiring foreigners to serve as ersatz employees and partners, implying the presence of overseas business connections. The practice was known as "White Guy Window Dressing", "White Guy in a Tie", or a "Face Job" by the actors being hired. Companies are able to encourage real estate investment because the mere presence of foreigners outside the major cities imply that region is attracting international attention.

Some personal advertisements in China offered rental services to serve as partners so the client's parents would not worry about their continued single status, especially at holidays. The legal status of such rentals is questionable in China, where it is legal to offer services and labor, but the "body [cannot be rented] as the subject of a [business] contract". Some of the friend rental platforms were noted to potentially facilitate prostitution, which is illegal in China.

== Service examples ==
I played a father for a 12-year-old with a single mother. The girl was bullied because she didn’t have a dad, so the mother rented me. I’ve acted as the girl’s father ever since. I am the only real father that she knows. [...] If the client never reveals the truth, I must continue the role indefinitely. If the daughter gets married, I have to act as a father in that wedding, and then I have to be the grandfather. So, I always ask every client, “Are you prepared to sustain this lie?” It’s the most significant problem our company has.

— Ishii Yuichi, founder and head of Family Romance, 2017 interview

Office Agents, a Tokyo-based company, offered wedding guests at a base price of ¥20,000 each in 2009, charging an additional ¥5,000 for the professional guest to sing or dance, and an additional ¥10,000 for a heartfelt speech. For one wedding, which was the groom's second marriage, Office Agents provided all thirty family, friend, and coworker guests of the groom, who did not want to invite the same people from his first marriage. The company stated it received 100 wedding requests per year and could call on a group of 1,000 actors.

The company Family Romance launched the "Real Appeal" service in 2017. "Real Appeal" provided clients with actors to pose with the client in photographs meant to be shared later on social media. The cost for each actor was ¥8,000 per hour, with a two-hour minimum, and all travel expenses were borne by the client. The service was designed to boost the client's perceived popularity.

Although the phenomenon of social isolation (hikikomori) is well-publicized in Japan and some families have hired rental friends to break that isolation, other clients are not withdrawn but are merely seeking a relationship not defined by societal expectations, i.e., a sympathetic or confessional ear.

Family Romance also offers a wedding service, which is staged two or three times a year at a cost of ¥5,000,000. In some cases, the rental includes guests and groom.

Another company, Ikemeso Takkyūbin, offers a service to induce people to cry, thereby achieving a sense of catharsis. The name of the company translates to "handsome men weeping delivery" or "tear couriers", as their first service offered was a ceremony to mark the end of a marriage, and their female clientele felt their emotions were heightened by an attractive man to wipe away their tears.

== Commentary ==
David McNeill, writing for The Independent, notes that "observers say the rent-a-friend trend is a sign of an accelerated deterioration in personal and professional relationships," and that companies used to be "family-like affairs where workers spent most of their lives and knew their bosses." However, the "post-1990s disintegration of lifetime employment and the rise of temp agencies [...] has fractured many of these bonds. Increasingly, family life offers little refuge: grandparents [...] mostly live apart from their children. A growing number of people are putting off marriage or children and leading atomised, lonely lives in cramped urban apartments."

In 1992, Erma Bombeck wrote about Japan Efficiency, which she described as a company that "provides a grandmother for parents of small children who do not have anyone to fill the role" and "will set up a sympathetic person for stressed-out executives as well as for people who are ill with the need to rant and rave to someone. She also offers personal assistants to recognition-starved homemakers. These are rental maids who don't actually clean house so much as they listen to the homemaker."

Bombeck drew parallels to the decline of family relationships in America, noting, "There was a time in the world when we acknowledged that we needed one another and we had responsibilities toward these needs. [...] Now we are independent of one another and too busy to deal with one another's problems."

== In popular culture ==
- Surviving Christmas, a 2004 American film starring Ben Affleck as a young millionaire who rents himself a family during the Christmas holiday season.
- Noriko's Dinner Table, a 2006 Japanese film about a 17-year-old girl, Noriko Shimabara, who runs away from her family and hometown, to Tokyo, where she joins a rental family company, I.C. Corp.
- Rent-A-Girlfriend, a manga series about a college student who rents a girlfriend to keep up appearances with his grandmother and friends.
- Family Romance, LLC, a 2019 film by Werner Herzog starring Yuichi Ishii, founder of rental family and friend service Family Romance.
- Five-Star Stranger, a 2024 debut novel by Kat Tang involving a "rental stranger" working in New York City.
- Rental Family, a 2025 film by Hikari, starring Brendan Fraser as a struggling American actor who begins working at a rental family business in Japan.

== See also ==
- Crowds on Demand, a service company that provides paid actors to augment crowds
- Extra (acting), a performer in a film, television show, stage, musical, opera or ballet production, who appears in a nonspeaking or nonsinging (silent) capacity, usually in the background
- Crisis actor, A trained actor or volunteer who plays a role during training drills for first responders, medical students, etc., sometimes requiring performers to exhibit injuries or symptoms to further the experience.
- Ghost followers, inactive social media accounts to pad follower statistics
- Girlfriend/boyfriend experience, whereby a person is hired to act like a significant other, but also involving sex work
- Professional mourning
