= Jimami Tofu =

- Directed by: Jason Chan; Christian Lee
- Written by: Jason Chan; Christian Lee
- Produced by: Jason Chan; Christian Lee
- Starring: Jason Chan; Mari Yamamoto; Rino Nakasone; Masane Tsukayama
- Production company: BananaMana Films
- Release dates: November 2017 (HIFF); March 28, 2018 (Singapore)
- Running time: 135 minutes
- Countries: Singapore, Japan
- Languages: English, Japanese

Jimami Tofu (Japanese: ジーマーミ豆腐) is a 2017 Singaporean-Japanese drama film written, produced and directed by Jason Chan and Christian Lee, starring Japanese actress Mari Yamamoto. Produced by Singapore-based BananaMana Films and supported by the Okinawa Convention and Visitors Bureau and the Okinawa Prefecture's Film Tourism Promotion Project, it made its world premiere at the 2017 Hawaii International Film Festival where it won the Audience Choice Award for Best Narrative Feature Film.

== Plot ==
A Chinese-Singaporean chef Ryan returns to Okinawa, Japan, in search of his lost love Yuki. Instead, he discovers the art of traditional Okinawan cuisine and finds new love in Nami, a childhood friend of Yuki.

== Cast ==
- Jason Chan as Ryan
- Mari Yamamoto as Yuki
- Rino Nakasone as Nami
- Masane Tsukayama as Sakamoto
- Christian Lee as Marcus

== Production ==
The film was BananaMana Films' first feature film.

== Notes ==
Jimami tofu or peanut tofu is a specialty of Okinawa Prefecture. "Jimami" is "peanuts" in the Okinawan language.
