= Monarch: Legacy of Monsters =

American monster television series

- Genre: Action-adventure; Drama; Science fiction; Monster
- Based on: Godzilla by Toho Co., Ltd.; Rodan by Toho Co., Ltd.
- Developed by: Chris Black; Matt Fraction
- Showrunner: Chris Black
- Starring: Anna Sawai; Kiersey Clemons; Ren Watabe; Mari Yamamoto; Anders Holm; Joe Tippett; Wyatt Russell; Kurt Russell; Elisa Lasowski
- Music by: Leopold Ross
- Country of origin: United States
- Original language: English
- No. of seasons: 2
- No. of episodes: 20

Production
- Executive producers: Thomas Tull; Hiro Matsuoka; Takemasa Arita; Max Borenstein; Brad Van Arragon; Andy Goddard; Andrew Colville; Matt Fraction; Matt Shakman; Tory Tunnell; Joby Harold; Chris Black; Jen Roskind; Lawrence Trilling; Wyatt Russell
- Cinematography: Jean Philippe Gossart; Chris Seager; Sam McCurdy; Ben Nott; David Burr
- Editors: Nona Khodai; Emily Streetz; Joe Talbot Hall; Mark Hartzell; Sarah C. Reeves
- Running time: 40–54 minutes
- Production companies: Safehouse Pictures; Toho; Milkfed Criminal Masterminds; Chris Black Broadcasting System; Legendary Television

Original release
- Network: Apple TV+
- Release: November 17, 2023 – January 12, 2024
- Network: Apple TV
- Release: February 27, 2026 – present

Monarch: Legacy of Monsters is an American monster television series created by Chris Black and Matt Fraction and produced by Legendary Television. Based on Godzilla by Toho Co., Ltd, it is the sixth installment and second television series in the Monsterverse franchise. Following the events of Godzilla (2014), the series follows members of the Monarch organization as they encounter Godzilla and other monsters called Titans, across a half century.

The series stars Anna Sawai, Kiersey Clemons, Ren Watabe, Mari Yamamoto, Anders Holm, Joe Tippett and Elisa Lasowski, alongside son-father duo Wyatt and Kurt Russell in the shared role of Lee Shaw. Monarch: Legacy of Monsters premiered on Apple TV+ on November 17, 2023, to positive reviews. In April 2024, the series was renewed for a second season, which premiered on February 27, 2026.

== Premise ==
In 2015, one year after the re-emergence of Godzilla, (Note: As depicted in Godzilla (2014)) half-siblings Cate and Kentaro Randa investigate their missing father Hiroshi's connection to Monarch, the covert organization monitoring giant monsters known as Titans or MUTOs ("Massive Unidentified Terrestrial Organisms"). Two generations earlier, Bill Randa and Keiko Miura are scientists involved with the early development of Monarch. Former Army officer Lee Shaw becomes a close ally to the Randa family across both time periods.

== Cast and characters ==
=== Main ===
- Anna Sawai as Cate Randa: A San Francisco schoolteacher coping with PTSD whose search for her missing father leads her to uncover his involvement with Monarch
- Kiersey Clemons as May Olowe-Hewitt: A former employee of Applied Experimental Technologies (later Apex Cybernetics (Note: As depicted in Godzilla vs. Kong (2021))) who fled to Japan under an alias after discovering that her company was using her code for nefarious purposes. Her real name is later revealed as Corah Mateo.
- Ren Watabe as Kentaro Randa: An artist and Cate's half-brother who joins her on a journey to find their mysterious father
- Mari Yamamoto as Keiko Miura: A scientist who investigates monsters with Lee Shaw and Bill Randa in the 1950s
- Anders Holm as Bill Randa: A cryptozoologist who becomes a leading researcher for Monarch
  - John Goodman as an older Bill Randa (guest season 1), reprising his role from Kong: Skull Island (2017)
- Joe Tippett as Tim: An overzealous Monarch office worker who goes into the field to track down the organization's lost documents
- Wyatt Russell and Kurt Russell as Lee Shaw: A former U.S. Army colonel who joins Keiko and Bill in their investigations of monsters and subsequently becomes involved with Monarch. Kurt portrays the older version of Shaw, encountered by Cate and Kentaro, while Wyatt plays the younger version, responsible for founding Monarch.
- Elisa Lasowski as Michelle Duvall (season 1): The sister of the late Sandra Brody and a skilled Monarch operative partnered with Tim

=== Recurring ===
- Takehiro Hira as Hiroshi Randa: Keiko's son, Bill's stepson, and Cate and Kentaro's father
- Qyoko Kudo as Emiko Randa (season 1; guest season 2): Kentaro's mother
- Christopher Heyerdahl as General Puckett (season 1): Shaw's superior officer
- Mirelly Taylor as Natalia Verdugo (season 1; guest season 2): The deputy director of Monarch
- Dominique Tipper as Brenda Holland (season 2; guest season 1): An executive at Applied Experimental Technologies (later Apex Cybernetics)
- Curtiss Cook as Reddick Barris (season 2): The director of Monarch
- Cliff Curtis as Jason Trissop (season 2): The head of Apex Cybernetics' Special Projects division
- Amber Midthunder as Isabel Simmons (season 2): A businesswoman who is Walter Simmons' adopted daughter

=== Guest ===
- Tamlyn Tomita as Caroline Randa: Cate's mother
- Bruce Baek as Du-Ho (season 1): Shaw's old friend and ally
- Jess Salgueiro as Dr. Barnes (season 1): A researcher at Monarch
- Charlie Hewson as James: Caroline's colleague
- Courtney Dietz as Dani (season 1): Cate's girlfriend
- Leo Ashizawa as Dr. Suzuki: A nuclear scientist
- Morgan Dudley as Lyra Mateo (season 1): May's sister
- Matthew MacCaull as Lieutenant-Commander Hatch (season 1): A high-ranking soldier serving under Puckett
- Augusto Aguilera as Tomás (season 2): The leader of a titan-worshipping cult on the island of Santa Soledad
- Camilo Jiménez Varón as Augustín (season 2): A fanatical member of Tomás' cult
- Camila Ponte Alvarez as Lucía (season 2): A sympathetic member of Tomás' cult
- Anna McGahan as Alex (season 2): Cate's friend and lover
- Bill Sage as Leland Shaw II (season 2): Lee's father

== Episodes ==
Season	Episodes	Originally released		
Season	Episodes	First released	Last released	Network
1	10	November 17, 2023	January 12, 2024	Apple TV+
2	10	February 27, 2026	May 1, 2026	Apple TV

=== Season 1 (2023–24) ===
No. overall	No. in season	Title	Directed by	Written by	Original release date
1	1	"Aftermath"	Matt Shakman	Chris Black	November 17, 2023
In 1973, Monarch researcher Bill Randa is chased by a Mother Longlegs spider on Skull Island, (Note: As depicted in Kong: Skull Island (2017)) and throws a waterproof case of his files into the ocean. In 2013, the case is found by a Japanese fishing boat. In 2014, following Godzilla's battle with the MUTOs in San Francisco, schoolteacher Cate Randa reunites with her father, Hiroshi, who later disappears in Alaska. In 2015, Cate travels to Tokyo to settle Hiroshi's affairs, but discovers that he had a second wife, Emiko, and a son, Kentaro. Kentaro leads Cate to Hiroshi's Tokyo office, where she discovers files belonging to Bill, Hiroshi's adoptive father. Cate and Kentaro recruit Kentaro's ex-girlfriend May to decode the files. Monarch employee Tim is notified of their activity, and reports it to his superiors. In 1959, Bill is on a research trip to an abandoned power plant in Kazakhstan with his wife Keiko Miura and friend Lee Shaw. They find a cavern beneath the plant, and discover eggs of insectoid Endoswarmers. Keiko and Shaw rappel down to collect genetic material, but the larvae hatch and drag Keiko into a pit.
2	2	"Departure"	Matt Shakman	Chris Black	November 17, 2023
In 2015, Kentaro discovers Monarch files in Hiroshi's office indicating that Shaw, his honorary great-uncle, moved to an assisted living facility in Japan. Tim and Monarch field operative Michelle Duvall track down Cate, Kentaro, and May in an attempt to find the decoded files, but they escape. Cate, Kentaro, and May go on the run and find Shaw, who reveals that Monarch is using the facility to keep him under house arrest. He convinces them to escape from the facility and follow Hiroshi to his last known location in Alaska. In 1952, Shaw is assigned as Keiko's escort on an expedition following unusual radiation in the Philippines. They meet Bill in the jungle, who claims to be following folk tales of a fire-breathing dragon. Keiko recruits Bill against a skeptical Shaw's advice, and Shaw departs. Continuing alone, Keiko and Bill discover the wreckage of the USS Lawton, a Navy ship that sank in 1943 from which Bill was the sole survivor. They discover corpses in the ship and are attacked by an Ion Dragon. Having seen the Dragon's radiation-based fire, Shaw returns to the ship and rescues them.
3	3	"Secrets and Lies"	Julian Holmes	Andrew Colville	November 22, 2023
In 2015, Cate, Kentaro, May, and Shaw escape Japan on a ferry bound for Pohang, Korea. In Pohang, they are accosted by border guards before one of them, Du-Ho, reveals himself as Shaw's old friend. Du-Ho transports them to Alaska by plane; on the way, May infers from Bill's files that Hiroshi was likely following a list of coordinates identified by Monarch. In Alaska, they find the wreckage of Hiroshi's plane as well as an encampment suggesting his survival. Du-Ho realizes that Hiroshi's plane was attacked after landing; a Frost Vark kills him and destroys his plane. In 1954, Shaw has joined Monarch in a command position. He, Bill, and Keiko present a cast of Godzilla's footprint to Shaw's superior officer, Gen. Puckett, to secure uranium for luring Godzilla out of hiding. In Bikini Atoll, Bill and Keiko are horrified to discover that Puckett has delivered the uranium as a nuclear bomb, to kill Godzilla under the guise of the Castle Bravo test. As Godzilla surfaces, Keiko attempts to halt the detonation, but Shaw restrains her and the bomb is detonated. In the aftermath, Shaw is given a blank check by Puckett for Monarch to research the Titans.
4	4	"Parallels and Interiors"	Julian Holmes	Milla Bell-Hart	December 1, 2023
In 2015, the Frost Vark's emergence is detected by Monarch. Cate, Kentaro, May, and Shaw manage to escape from the Frost Vark, but May falls into a pool of water and quickly develops hypothermia as they try to find shelter. Kentaro splits off from the rest of the group and finds a building that he saw from the plane, which turns out to be an old radio station that had previously been repaired by Hiroshi. Having learned that the Frost Vark feeds on heat energy, Cate, May and Shaw create a bonfire to distract it, while a helicopter that Kentaro contacted arrives and rescues them. The group are taken to a Monarch outpost, where they are greeted by Tim and Duvall. In 2013, Kentaro meets May while waiting for his first art show at a prestigious gallery. He chooses to spend the evening with her instead of preparing for the show, and they bond. Kentaro ultimately decides to present his art before he is ready to do so, out of a desire to make his father proud. The night of the gallery is the last time he sees Hiroshi before the latter's disappearance.
5	5	"The Way Out"	Mairzee Almas	Amanda Overton	December 8, 2023
In 2015, Monarch deputy director Natalia Verdugo is frustrated to learn that Shaw has kept Cate, Kentaro, and May in the dark about Hiroshi's activities in Alaska. Duvall suggests releasing the three to track their movements. After returning to San Francisco, Cate convinces her mother, Caroline, and Caroline's colleague James to smuggle them towards Hiroshi's local office in a restricted zone of the city's ruins. Evading military patrols and dealing with Cate's PTSD, they eventually reach Hiroshi's office. While they fail to find further hidden files, Kentaro concludes from Hiroshi's maps that he likely headed to Africa in search of Titans. May secretly contacts Duvall, asking to go home in exchange for her cooperation. In 2014, two days before Godzilla's emergence, Cate is in a relationship with fellow teacher Dani, who discusses moving in together. Unknown to Dani, Cate cheats on her with another woman named Evin. On G-Day, a guilt-ridden Cate leaves Dani behind to chaperone a bus of children across the Golden Gate Bridge. When Godzilla crashes through the bridge during his clash with the military, most of the children are killed.
6	6	"Terrifying Miracles"	Mairzee Almas	Karl Greenfeld	December 15, 2023
In 2015, Duvall breaks Shaw out of captivity, revealing that she joined Monarch after her sister died in the Janjira power plant disaster but has become disillusioned. They take Cate, Kentaro, and May to the Algerian Sahara, where they find Hiroshi using a Titan lure. He warns them to escape before fleeing. Tim arrives with a team of Monarch agents, but Godzilla emerges, having been sleeping underground, and causes their helicopter to crash. Shaw and Duvall reveal their intent to follow and help Godzilla, but Cate, Kentaro, and May leave to find Hiroshi. Cate and Kentaro are angered when May reveals that she allowed Monarch to track them. In 1955, Shaw and Keiko attend a defense industry ball, where they bond. Bill recalls them to Monarch headquarters, and they learn that Dr. Suzuki, a Japanese scientist, has captured unusual isotopic signatures and used them to design a Titan lure. As Bill and Keiko travel to meet Suzuki, Shaw reluctantly stays behind to present a budget proposal, but he eventually abandons the meeting and joins them in Japan due to his feelings for Keiko. The lure attracts Godzilla, who destroys it. When Shaw, Keiko and Bill return to the United States to inform Puckett of Godzilla's survival, they learn that he has transferred Monarch's command due to Shaw's absence.
7	7	"Will the Real May Please Stand Up?"	Hiromi Kamata	Mariko Tamaki	December 22, 2023
In 2015, May is kidnapped at the airport in Tindouf, Algeria by her former employer, Brenda Holland of Applied Experimental Technologies, who gives her the choice of spying on Monarch or being prosecuted. Cate accosts Tim when he arrives at the airport and asks him to help locate May. Tim, Cate, and Kentaro find May's family in Tacoma, Washington and learn about her past from her sister, Lyra Mateo. They trigger a false Titan alert to rescue May from AET, but she chooses to stay behind and not spy on Monarch. Verdugo is convinced by Cate to secure May's release in exchange for help understanding Shaw's plans, and by Tim to take Monarch public to explain the alert. After reaching an agreement with Monarch, AET rebrands to Apex Cybernetics. Shaw and Duvall take over Monarch's Alaska outpost and use explosives to seal a tunnel to the Hollow Earth. In 2012, May – then known as Corah Mateo – is recruited by AET. Dissatisfied with the secrecy around her work, she hacks into AET's systems and discovers that they are secretly conducting cybernetic animal experimentation. Horrified, she destroys their research data and flees to Japan under a false identity.
8	8	"Birthright"	Hiromi Kamata	Al Letson	December 29, 2023
In 2015, Shaw and Duvall return to the Kazakhstan power plant where Keiko was lost in 1959, now enclosed in a containment facility. Cate, Kentaro, May, and Tim deduce that Shaw is trying to rectify the past, and Verdugo sends them after him with a small team. Shaw and Duvall confront the team when they arrive at the plant, and Shaw informs Cate that he intends to help Godzilla maintain order by separating the Hollow Earth from the surface world. As Shaw primes explosive charges around a tunnel to the Hollow Earth inside the pit, an adult Endoswarmer emerges. May, Cate, Shaw, and the Endoswarmer fall back into the tunnel before its destruction. In 1955, Monarch's new head Lt. Cmdr. Hatch questions Shaw, Keiko, and Bill's evidence of the Titans' existence. Bill assaults Hatch while defending Keiko from a racist remark. With Monarch's existence under jeopardy, Shaw convinces Keiko and Bill to compile their research. Bill realizes that Titans evade detection through the Hollow Earth. While sharing his findings with Keiko, he learns that she is a widow raising Hiroshi alone, and they begin to develop a relationship. As a last resort, Shaw reveals Godzilla's survival while presenting Keiko and Bill's findings to Puckett.
9	9	"Axis Mundi"	Andy Goddard	Matt Fraction	January 5, 2024
In 2015, Monarch rescues Kentaro and Tim. Cate, May, and Shaw are presumed dead, but Emiko inspires Kentaro to continue searching. Kentaro confronts Hiroshi when he returns. Meanwhile, Shaw and May awaken in an intermediate realm between the surface and the Hollow Earth, known as Axis Mundi, and search for Cate. Nearby, Cate is attacked by a Bramble Boar, but is rescued by an unaged Keiko. In 1962, Shaw volunteers to lead Operation Hourglass, an expedition into the Hollow Earth. Suzuki's Titan lure is used to induce a partial Titan emergence and stabilize a Hollow Earth tunnel in Kansas. During the launch, the tunnel implodes, and Shaw’s team is lost. Monarch's funding is cut due to this incident. An Ion Dragon kills Shaw's team in Axis Mundi, before he is sucked through another tunnel that leads back to the surface. In 1982, Shaw awakens in Japan. Holding Emiko hostage and demanding to see Bill, Shaw is met by an adult Hiroshi, who reveals that Bill has died and that Monarch intends to leave the Titans undisturbed. Shaw is placed under house arrest after multiple escape attempts. Thirty-two years later, he sees the news of Godzilla fighting a MUTO in Hawaii.
10	10	"Beyond Logic"	Andy Goddard	Chris Black	January 12, 2024
In 2015, Keiko tells Cate that she found the equipment left behind by the Operation Hourglass team, and rigged their lure to send a distress signal to the surface. They reunite with May and Shaw, but Keiko is devastated to learn of Bill's death and that decades have passed on the surface. Tim leaves Monarch after clashing with Verdugo over her refusal to investigate Keiko's signal, and informs Kentaro and Hiroshi. Shaw, Keiko, Cate and May reconnect the lure to Shaw's old launch vehicle, but inadvertently lure an Ion Dragon already present in Axis Mundi. Shaw exits the vehicle to reconnect a dislodged cable, while Godzilla emerges through a tunnel and battles the Dragon, throwing it back into the tunnel and activating the vehicle. Keiko struggles to bring Shaw back into the vehicle, but he falls and is left behind. In 2017, at an Apex Cybernetics research station on Skull Island, Hiroshi returns the vehicle to the surface; he, Kentaro, and Tim — now working with an Apex team led by Brenda — reunite with Keiko, Cate, and May. They evacuate as Kong approaches the station.

=== Season 2 (2026) ===
No. overall	No. in season	Title	Directed by	Written by	Original release date
11	1	"Cause and Effect"	Lawrence Trilling	Chris Black	February 27, 2026
In 2017, Kong attacks the Apex station on Skull Island, forcing everyone to evacuate to Monarch's Outpost 18, a large ship nearby. Brenda offers May a new job with Apex, but she declines. Verdugo refuses to retrieve Shaw while Kong is still behaving aggressively, but Cate, Kentaro, Hiroshi, and May secretly return to the damaged station. Keiko, Verdugo, and Tim fly back in to retrieve them, but Cate refuses to give up on Shaw and launches his old vehicle back down the tunnel to Axis Mundi. Shaw, who has survived, finds the vehicle and returns to the surface, but the energy surge awakens a tentacled Titan that was hibernating in Axis Mundi, as well as a swarm of large crustaceans called Scarabs. The new Titan surfaces on Skull Island, kills Verdugo, and is chased into the ocean by Kong. In 1957, Keiko, Shaw, and Bill travel to a remote village on the island of Santa Soledad in Chile, investigating rumors of a sea monster. They find one of the Scarabs displayed in the village bar, and are later led to a cave where they see ancient rock art of the tentacled Titan, which is worshipped by the locals as a god.
12	2	"Resonance"	Lawrence Trilling	Dan Dworkin	March 6, 2026
In 2017, Shaw and Keiko recognize the Titan as the group return to Outpost 18, unaware that one of the Scarabs has hid on their helicopter. Tim assumes command and receives orders to arrest Shaw, but chooses not to. The Titan approaches the Strait of Malacca in Indonesia. Hiroshi attempts to change its course using a sonar-projecting drone, but the Titan destroys it. Cate is attacked by a Scarab; Kentaro and May save her, but the Scarab calls the Titan to pursue Outpost 18. Shaw uses a Zodiac to throws the Scarab into the ocean, diverting the Titan. In 1957, Bill uses the cave art on Santa Soledad to map out a migratory route for the Titan, but Keiko refuses to leave until she can finish studying the island. Bill and Shaw reluctantly agree, and Bill leaves to follow the map. Keiko tells Shaw about her first husband, Hiroshi's father, who died of cancer shortly after Hiroshi was born. They are invited to a nighttime festival, but the local villagers are revealed to be a cult worshipping the new Titan, which they refer to as "Co-Cai". A swarm of Scarabs emerge from the cave, as Co-Cai approaches the village.
13	3	"Secrets"	Hiromi Kamata	Kari Drake	March 13, 2026
In 2017, Outpost 18 docks in Tokyo, and Cate leaves. Hiroshi, Keiko and Shaw plan to lure Co-Cai, dubbed "Titan X", away from cities using a sonic version of Suzuki's Titan lure, but an Apex team, led by Jason Trissop, assume command of the outpost. Monarch's director, Reddick Barris, orders Tim to arrest Shaw and Keiko, but he allows them to leave with Hiroshi and Kentaro. Keiko learns about Hiroshi's two marriages. Cate returns to San Francisco and struggles to cope with her guilt and trauma. May infiltrates Apex by accepting Brenda's job offer, and discovers that they stole Hiroshi's lure. In 1957, Keiko and Shaw observe Titan X interacting with the Scarabs, and Keiko photographs it. The cultists attack them; Keiko and Shaw manage to escape with the film into the island's forest. While hiding from the cultists, they have a romantic encounter. Bill returns the next day and rescues them, but Keiko struggles with guilt and sends a letter to Shaw, expressing her feelings for him but reaffirming her love for Bill. In 1962, Bill is raising Hiroshi after Shaw's disappearance, and finds Keiko's letter in Shaw's old files.
14	4	"Trespass"	Hiromi Kamata	Al Letson	March 20, 2026
In the 1960s, after sending Hiroshi to stay with Keiko's family, Bill continues his research. After his death in 1973, his files are archived. In 2015, some files, including Keiko's letter, are stolen by Apex operatives. In 2017, Titan X awakens another swarm of Scarabs in American Samoa. On Outpost 18, Trissop and Tim detect Titan X, indicating that it is heading towards San Francisco. Kentaro, Hiroshi, Keiko and Shaw meet May in Pensacola, where they plan to steal Hiroshi's lure from Apex. In San Francisco, Cate meets a student she saved on G-Day and decides to return. Tim's team and the U.S. Pacific Fleet intercept Titan X, but the signal is from a whale. In Pensacola, the others infiltrate Apex headquarters and discover that Apex has been smuggling creatures off of Skull Island. Brenda shows May that Apex has developed neural implants to pacify Titans. Shaw and Kentaro cause a distraction, allowing Hiroshi and Keiko to find the dismantled lure. They discover that Apex have Bill's files, including his map of Titan X's migratory route. They realize it is headed to Santa Soledad. May chooses to stay with Apex, but the others escape and reunite with Cate.
15	5	"Furusato"	Jeff F. King	Andrew Colville	March 27, 2026
In 1990, Hiroshi calls a young Cate to help her fall asleep, while waiting in the hospital for Kentaro's birth. He and Emiko name Kentaro after Hiroshi's birth father. In 2017, Brenda, May and Trissop lead an Apex team to Santa Soledad, with Cate, Kentaro, Hiroshi, Keiko and Shaw in pursuit. Shaw and the Randas privately approach May, who believes that pacifying the Titans is worth the risk, but Shaw theorizes that Apex intends to use the Titans as weapons. Titan X arrives and awakens the island's swarm of Scarabs, which injure Shaw. Its calls have a hypnotic effect on Cate, and she is drawn to the water's edge as it emerges. The Apex team fires an upgraded neural implant into Titan X, but the implant fails to control it, and an enraged Titan X removes the implant and destroys their camp before departing. Hiroshi is fatally wounded while saving Cate; he apologizes to her for his past mistakes, before dying in Keiko's arms as Tim and his team arrive. In 2014, Hiroshi is about to visit Emiko and Kentaro in Tokyo when he receives a call from Tim, who informs him that Bill's case of files from 1973 has been found in the ocean near Japan.
16	6	"Requiem"	Jeff F. King	Maria Melnik	April 3, 2026
In 2017 before the rescue from Axis Mundi, Hiroshi reveals to Kentaro that when he went to Alaska in 2014, he accidentally traveled through a tunnel to Axis Mundi and, after spending a day there, emerged in Africa in 2015. In 2017, Hiroshi's funeral is held. Kentaro lashes out at Cate for causing Hiroshi's death, while Shaw and Keiko reunite with Dr. Suzuki. Cate, Keiko and Shaw travel to Suzuki's home in Japan, where he explains that Hiroshi helped him rebuild his Titan lure. Shaw plans to use the lure to summon Godzilla, hoping that he can defeat Titan X. May visits Kentaro in Tokyo to reconcile, but he rebuffs her and meets Isabel Simmons, one of Walter Simmons' daughters, who invites him to work with her. Keiko and Cate discover that Cate is connected to Titan X, and theorize that it may be lost and confused as a result of Apex's neural attack. Shaw and Suzuki test Suzuki's lure at the entrance to the Hollow Earth tunnel Shaw emerged from in 1982. The tunnel briefly opens, and Shaw picks up a distress signal he had sent during his time trapped in Axis Mundi in 1962. In 1958, Monarch has received additional funding due to Keiko's photographs of Titan X, but Shaw decides to request a transfer due to guilt over his affair with her. He later reunites with his abrasive father, who interferes with Shaw's transfer in an attempt to secure him a higher-level position, but Shaw rejects him and chooses to return to Monarch.
17	7	"String Theory"	Gandja Monteiro	Joe Pokaski	April 10, 2026
In 2017, due to the time-bending nature of Axis Mundi, Shaw finds himself communicating with his younger self when he was trapped there. Concealing his identity from young Shaw, he has him plant a tracking device on the hibernating Titan X. When his younger self gets suspicious, Shaw confesses the truth and convinces young Shaw not to make contact with Keiko. He then parts ways with Suzuki and follows the tracker to Australia, as Monarch also detects it. Kentaro travels to Thailand to meet Isabel, who explains she was adopted by Walter Simmons but then sidelined after the birth of her sister Maia, and hints at a plan to use Axis Mundi to undo G-Day. Tim summons May and asks for her help in examining a sample of Titan X. Keiko and Cate investigate a shrine after learning from Bill's notes of other women who heard Titan X's song, and Cate finds a cavern system where the song is amplified, enabling her to understand that Titan X was asking for help.
18	8	"Separate Ways"	Gandja Monteiro	Mariko Tamaki	April 17, 2026
In 2017, Cate and Keiko rejoin Monarch and convince Director Barris to let them communicate with Titan X before the U.S. military attacks it. Kentaro joins them, but lets slip to May about his meeting with Isabel. With Tim's help, May visits Brenda in Monarch custody to inquire about her awareness of Isabel's plans. Cate's group confront Shaw, who has set up Suzuki's lure to attract Godzilla. While Keiko distracts him, Cate approaches Titan X and discovers that it has laid an egg. As Godzilla arrives and attacks Titan X, Kentaro signals Isabel's team, led by Trissop, who steal the egg. During the fight, Trissop is killed by Godzilla. Cate is forced to flee with Kentaro, and Keiko and Shaw watch helplessly as Titan X rushes into the ocean after the egg, with Godzilla close behind.
19	9	"Ends of the Earth"	Lawrence Trilling	Tanner Hansinger	April 24, 2026
In 1958, Keiko and Bill marry in a private ceremony in Papua New Guinea, but Bill has trouble coming up with his vows. In 2017, Outpost 18 follows Godzilla and Titan X to the outskirts of Skull Island, where Godzilla ceases his pursuit. After arriving at her base on the island, Isabel tells Cate that she wants to open a tunnel to Axis Mundi permanently and use it as a gateway to the future, but later informs Kentaro that she also plans to have Titan X kill Kong. Isabel's team successfully tranquilize Titan X after luring it to the egg. Tim, Shaw, Keiko, May, and Monarch soldiers follow Titan X onto the island, but Shaw and Keiko are separated from the others after an attack by tree-dwelling Vinestranglers. Isabel's men remove the tracker from Titan X, but Cate escapes and contacts the Monarch team. Following Bill's maps, Shaw and Keiko find a Hollow Earth tunnel entrance and multiple probes that Bill sent to Skull Island through other tunnels around the world. Each probe contains a message to Keiko: his belated wedding vows. Isabel's team increases Titan X's aggression with neural implants as Kong senses its presence. Kentaro finds Cate and claims that they can save Hiroshi. In 1959, Bill and Shaw mourn Keiko after her disappearance. In 1968, Bill is lecturing about his rift theories in Pennsylvania when he is visited by Suzuki, who admonishes him for neglecting Hiroshi by chasing Keiko's ghost.
20	10	"Where We Belong"	Lawrence Trilling	Teleplay by : Joe Pokaski; Story by : Andrew Colville	May 1, 2026
In 2017, Kentaro explains Isabel's theory that he can rescue the version of Hiroshi from 2014, when he was trapped in Axis Mundi. Keiko learns about Shaw's interaction with his younger self, before they meet up with Tim's team. Cate escapes from Isabel's base as Kong arrives and battles Titan X. Keiko rescues Cate while Tim and May enter the base; they are unable to deactivate the overloading neural implants, but are able to pacify Titan X and disable the implants by returning the egg, ending the fight. Shaw steals one of Isabel's helicopters and picks up Cate, Keiko, Tim, and May, while Isabel and Kentaro escape on another helicopter. Cate leads Titan X to the Hollow Earth tunnel entrance, and Titan X returns to Axis Mundi with the egg. Shaw and Keiko have a short vision of Shaw's younger self, who bids Keiko goodbye. Six weeks later, Hiroshi is added to a memorial for deceased Monarch employees, while Barris recruits May, Keiko, and Cate into Monarch alongside Tim and assigns them to the task of tracking down Kentaro and Isabel. Meanwhile, Shaw is already following the pair to Thailand; he meets up with an old friend, A-Wut, and is led to a volcano where he sees Rodan.

== Production ==
=== Development ===
Following the success of Godzilla vs. Kong, discussions commenced on ways that the MonsterVerse could be expanded beyond feature films. Legendary proposed a live-action series, and among the potential investors, Apple TV+ expressed immediate interest, negotiated a deal, and green-lit the series in January 2022. It is a joint venture between Legendary Television, Safehouse Pictures, and Toho, although Warner Bros. still owns the rights for the MonsterVerse franchise alongside Legendary. Chris Black and Matt Fraction are creators with Black as showrunner. In May, Matt Shakman was hired to direct the first two episodes in addition to executive producing. In addition to Black and Matt Fraction, writers include Andrew Colville, Milla Bell-Hart, Amanda Overton, Karl Taro Greenfeld, Mariko Tamaki, and Al Letson.

On April 11, 2024, Apple TV+ renewed the series for a second season, with several spinoffs in development. In October 2026, it was reported that a third season was in development, with Legendary Television seeking a new showrunner and new writers to join the series.

=== Casting ===
In June 2022, Anna Sawai, Ren Watabe, Kiersey Clemons, Joe Tippett, and Elisa Lasowski were cast. In July, Kurt Russell and Wyatt Russell were cast, and Mari Yamamoto joined in August. In September, Anders Holm was cast and revealed the title. In September 2023, the teaser trailer revealed John Goodman to reprise his role from Kong: Skull Island (2017) as William "Bill" Randa.

=== Filming ===
In July 2022, it was revealed that principal photography had commenced in Vancouver, British Columbia, Canada. Two weeks of filming occurred in Japan in August.

Filming for the second season was underway by July 31, 2024, and wrapped by February 20, 2025.

=== Music ===
In October 2023, Leopold Ross was confirmed as score composer. The soundtrack was released online by Milan Records on November 17, 2023, with the main titles track released on November 3 as a single. The soundtrack for the second season was released online by Milan Records on February 27, 2026.

Monarch: Legacy of Monsters (Apple TV+ Original Series Soundtrack)
No.	Title	Length
1.	"Main Titles"	1:30
2.	"Depth Charge"	4:06
3.	"Legacy"	2:40
4.	"Hostile Takeover"	2:43
5.	"Family Business"	3:28
6.	"Colonel Shaw"	3:56
7.	"Separate Lives"	5:17
8.	"Not in Trouble"	1:47
9.	"Love and Titans"	3:38
10.	"Critters"	3:20
11.	"Lost Time"	4:05
12.	"Homecoming"	4:00
Total length:		40:30

Monarch: Legacy of Monsters Season 2 (Apple Original Series Soundtrack)
No.	Title	Length
1.	"Kong Rampage"	2:30
2.	"Stirred the Pot"	2:18
3.	"Radiation Alert Plan"	4:01
4.	"Unleashed"	6:05
5.	"Risk vs. Reward"	2:58
6.	"The Bottom of the World"	3:51
7.	"Return to Skull Island"	2:33
8.	"Here Be Monsters"	4:02
9.	"Apex"	4:07
10.	"Co-Existence"	1:58
11.	"Chinook"	3:27
12.	"Saying Goodbye"	6:24
Total length:		44:14

== Release ==
Monarch: Legacy of Monsters premiered on Apple TV+ on November 17, 2023. The second season premiered on Apple TV on February 27, 2026.

=== Marketing ===
In August 2023, Apple released first look images, now officially titled Monarch: Legacy of Monsters. The teaser and more images were released on September 8, 2023. The first trailer debuted at the 2023 New York Comic Con, and the official poster was revealed. In October 2023, a viral marketing website called "Monarch Unlocked" was launched with some Monarch computer private files.

== Reception ==
=== Critical response ===
On review aggregator Rotten Tomatoes, the first season has an approval rating of 86% based on 87 reviews. The site's critics consensus reads, "With performances by father–son duo Kurt and Wyatt Russell that work a charm, Monarch adds a welcome wrinkle to the Godzilla legacy by honing its monstrous scope to a very human level." Metacritic, which uses a weighted average, assigned a score of 68 out of 100, based on 26 critics, indicating "generally favorable" reviews.

Mike Hale of The New York Times commended the straightforward narrative and visual effects, and noted that Kurt Russell's presence gave it a "nostalgic charm". In Variety, Aramide Tinubu wrote that the series "will likely satisfy the most novice MonsterVerse explorer".

Writing for RogerEbert.com, Brian Tallerico praised the performances of Kurt and Wyatt Russell, but he expressed dissatisfaction with the writing, describing the characters as "underdeveloped", the plot as lacking depth, and the dialogue as too lengthy.

The second season holds a 76% approval rating on review aggregator Rotten Tomatoes based on 29 critic reviews. The website's critics consensus states, "Against all odds, Monarch continues to pack a striking gut-punch of action-drama by embracing its Legacy of Monsters' talent and leading with a cast of rich and complex characters." On Metacritic, the second season received a score of 67 out of 100 based on 11 critics, signifying "generally favorable".

=== Accolades ===
Award	Date of ceremony	Category	Recipient(s)	Result	Ref.
Visual Effects Society Awards	February 21, 2024	Outstanding Visual Effects in a Photoreal Episode	Sean Konrad, Jessica Smith, Jed Glassford, Khalid Almeerani, and Paul Benjamin	Nominated	
Guild of Music Supervisors Awards	March 3, 2024	Best Music Supervision in a Trailer (Series)	Deric Berberabe and Jordan Silverberg	Nominated	
Critics' Choice Super Awards	April 4, 2024	Best Science Fiction/Fantasy Series, Limited Series or Made-for-TV Movie	Monarch: Legacy of Monsters	Nominated	
Critics' Choice Super Awards	April 4, 2024	Best Actor in a Science Fiction/Fantasy Series, Limited Series or Made-for-TV Movie	Kurt Russell	Won (Note: Tied with Jharrel Jerome for I'm a Virgo)	
Leo Awards	July 6, 2024	Best Make-Up in a Dramatic Series	Patricia Murray, Dennis Liddiard, Bev Hoy, Mallory Greaves, Lisa Love, Teia Dumaresq, and Jan Ballard (for "Terrifying Miracles")	Won	
Leo Awards	July 6, 2024	Best Hairstyling in a Dramatic Series	Debra Wiebe, Lilia Afsahi, Tammy Lim, Yvette Stone, and Teresa Tso (for "Terrifying Miracles")	Nominated	
Leo Awards	July 6, 2024	Best Stunt Coordination in a Motion Picture or Dramatic Series	Jeff Aro (for "Departure")	Nominated	
Leo Awards	July 6, 2024	Best Stunt Performance in a Motion Picture or Dramatic Series	Maja Aro (for "Departure")	Nominated	
Astra TV Awards	December 8, 2024	Best Streaming Drama Series	Monarch: Legacy of Monsters	Nominated	
Astra TV Awards	December 8, 2024	Best Actor in a Streaming Drama Series	Kurt Russell	Nominated	
Astra TV Awards	December 8, 2024	Best Supporting Actor in a Streaming Drama Series	Wyatt Russell	Nominated	
Astra TV Awards	December 8, 2024	Best Guest Actor in a Drama Series	John Goodman	Nominated	
Saturn Awards	February 2, 2025	Best Adventure Television Series	Monarch: Legacy of Monsters	Won	
Saturn Awards	February 2, 2025	Best Actor in a Television Series	Kurt Russell and Wyatt Russell	Nominated	
Saturn Awards	February 2, 2025	Best Supporting Actress in a Television Series	Anna Sawai	Nominated	
Primetime Creative Arts Emmy Awards	September 5–6, 2026	Outstanding Special Visual Effects in a Season or a Movie	Sean Konrad, Elizabeth Willaman, Bryn Morrow, Marc Varisco, Bryan Hirota, Pier Lefebvre, Cody Baker, Julian Summers, Kelly Redmond, Jeremy Burns, Lara Bannister, and Jourdan Bizou	Pending	

== Spin-off ==
On November 27, 2025, Apple TV reportedly greenlit a prequel series set during the Cold War with Wyatt Russell reprising his role as young Lee Shaw and serving as an executive producer. Joby Harold was reported to serve as showrunner and executive produce with his wife and producing partner Tory Tunnell through their production company Safehouse Pictures. In June 2026, it was reported that Millie Brady and Pilou Asbæk had been cast opposite Russell, while J. D. Dillard was tapped to direct the pilot episode. In July 2026, Corey Stoll, Ralph Ineson and Nyasha Hatendi joined the cast of the series. In August 2026, Connie Nielsen and Stana Katic joined the cast. In November 2026, Tim Robbins and Giancarlo Esposito were added to the cast as guest stars, while Michiel Huisman, Samuel Armfield and Erik Alens joined the cast in recurring roles.
