= Rental Family =

2025 comedy-drama film by Hikari

- Theatrical release poster
- Directed by: Hikari
- Written by: Hikari; Stephen Blahut
- Produced by: Eddie Vaisman; Julia Lebedev; Hikari; Shin Yamaguchi
- Starring: Brendan Fraser; Takehiro Hira; Mari Yamamoto; Shannon Mahina Gorman; Akira Emoto
- Cinematography: Takurō Ishizaka
- Edited by: Alan Baumgarten; Thomas A. Krueger
- Music by: Jónsi; Alex Somers
- Production companies: Sight Unseen Productions; Domo Arigato Productions
- Distributed by: Searchlight Pictures
- Release dates: September 6, 2025 (TIFF); November 21, 2025 (United States); February 27, 2026 (Japan)
- Running time: 110 minutes
- Countries: United States; Japan
- Languages: English; Japanese
- Box office: $27.4 million

Rental Family is a 2025 comedy-drama film directed by Hikari, who co-wrote it with Stephen Blahut. It stars Brendan Fraser as an American actor based in Japan who begins working for a rental family agency, where he plays roles in the lives of strangers. The supporting cast includes Takehiro Hira, Mari Yamamoto, Shannon Mahina Gorman, and Akira Emoto.

An international co-production between American and Japanese production companies, Rental Family premiered at the 2025 Toronto International Film Festival on September 6 and was released in the United States by Searchlight Pictures on November 21, 2025. The film was officially released in Japan on February 27, 2026. It received positive reviews from critics, who singled out Fraser's performance. The National Board of Review included it on its list of the year's top 10 films.

== Plot ==
American actor Phillip Vanderploeg lives in Tokyo and constantly searches for work following his success in a toothpaste commercial seven years earlier. He is stuck taking minor roles until being hired by Rental Family, a company that provides actors to play stand-in family members and friends for strangers. Initially reluctant due to its absurd premise, Phillip, desperate for funds, accepts after the company's owner, Shinji, insists that they need a "token white guy".

Phillip is hired to act as the fiancé of Yoshie, who wants to perform a traditional wedding for her parents. Phillip nearly bails, reluctant to lie to Yoshie's family, but his co-worker Aiko convinces him to commit. After the wedding, Phillip discovers that Yoshie is a closeted lesbian who is already married and is planning to secretly depart to Canada with her wife. They profusely thank him for his help, giving him a different perspective on the job.

Phillip takes on a long-term job acting as the estranged father of a young half-Japanese girl named Mia, whose single mother, Hitomi, believes that presenting Phillip as Mia's real father (even to Mia herself) will help Mia enroll in a private school. In another long-term role, Phillip is hired by a woman named Masami to act as a journalist profiling her father Kikuo Hasegawa, a retired actor with dementia; Masami hopes Phillip will make Kikuo feel remembered.

Phillip forms strong bonds with Kikuo and Mia, who initially resents her "father" for abandoning her but eventually warms up to him. Phillip's agent informs him that he has landed a highly coveted role, which he declines for Mia's sake. Hitomi warns Phillip against getting too close to Mia and is offended when he criticizes her for planning Mia's whole life for her.

At Masami's insistence, Phillip reluctantly declines Kikuo's request to take him to his abandoned childhood home in Amakusa. He also learns that some of Aiko's jobs involve her pretending to be a mistress apologizing to the wives of unfaithful husbands, often resulting in the women physically assaulting her. Phillip is reluctant to lose the connections he has made, but Shinji asserts that parting ways with clients is a brutal but inevitable part of the job.

Following the successful school interview, Phillip is forced to tell Mia that he must return to the United States. His time with her inspires him to take Kikuo to Amakusa. There, Kikuo finds a time capsule containing pictures of himself with his first wife, who died of an illness shortly after he left her to pursue his acting career in Tokyo; he breaks down upon seeing the photos and tearfully thanks Phillip for bringing him.

Shinji calls Phillip and berates him for "kidnapping" Kikuo, but Phillip accuses him of using Rental Family to soullessly fill empty holes rather than make genuine connections. Kikuo collapses from exhaustion and is rushed to the hospital by Phillip, who is arrested for Kikuo's abduction.

Mia discovers Phillip's true identity when her friend recognizes him on television. She is initially upset with her mother for lying to her, but later forgives her. During another session where Aiko acts as a man's mistress, she suddenly breaks character, informs the man's wife of the truth, and leaves, later making an oral resignation to Shinji. At home, a perplexed Shinji dismisses his "wife" and "son," revealing them to be rented actors.

Aiko and her co-worker Kota pretend to be lawyers interviewing Kikuo in an attempt to exonerate Phillip. Shinji also arrives, posing as a police detective. They convince Masami not to press charges against Phillip. Some time later, Kikuo dies in his sleep. Aiko, Shinji, Kota, and Phillip attend his funeral, where Phillip lays the photos from the time capsule on his body.

Phillip visits Mia at the school, which she was accepted into. He reintroduces himself to her with his real name, and the two continue to spend time together as friends. Phillip and Aiko continue working at Rental Family, which discontinues the "apology services" that led to Aiko's abuse.

Phillip returns to the Shinto shrine he once prayed at with Kikuo; having previously declined Kikuo's invitation to see what he was praying to, he looks inside, sees his reflection in a mirror, and smiles.

== Cast ==
- Brendan Fraser as Phillip Vanderploeg, an American actor in Japan
- Takehiro Hira as Shinji, the owner of Rental Family
- Mari Yamamoto as Aiko, a Rental Family employee
- Shannon Mahina Gorman as Mia Kawasaki, a young half-Japanese girl in need of a father figure
- Akira Emoto as Kikuo Hasegawa, a retired actor
- Shino Shinozaki as Hitomi, Mia's mother and a Rental Family client
- Kimura Bun as Kota, a Rental Family employee
- Sei Matobu as Masami Hasegawa, Kikuo's daughter and a Rental Family client
- Misato Morita as Yoshie Ikeda, a closeted Rental Family client
- Tamae Ando as Lola

== Production ==
The film started development in 2019. In November 2023, Brendan Fraser was set to star in the film with Hikari directing from a script she co-wrote with Stephen Blahut. In March 2024, Mari Yamamoto, Takehiro Hira, and Akira Emoto joined the cast. Principal photography began in Japan on March 12 and wrapped in late May.

== Release ==
An international co-production between the United States and Japan, Rental Family had its world premiere at the Toronto International Film Festival on September 6, 2025. It was theatrically released in the United States by Searchlight Pictures on November 21. The film was screened at the Adelaide Film Festival in Australia on October 18, 2025. On October 19, 2025, the film was shown within the 20th Rome Film Festival in the 'Grand Public' section, while on November 3, 2025, it was showcased at the 38th Tokyo International Film Festival in the 'Gala Selection' section. It was screened in the Icon section of the 2025 Stockholm International Film Festival on 5 November 2025. The film was officially released in Japan on February 27, 2026.

The film was released on digital streaming on January 13, 2026, and on Blu-ray and DVD on February 17.

== Reception ==
=== Box office ===
The film was expected to launch in the low digits, projected to make $2.6 million in its opening weekend. It made $3.3 million.

=== Critical response ===
On the review aggregator website Rotten Tomatoes, 87% of 204 critics' reviews are positive, with an average rating of 7.1/10. The website's consensus reads: "A sweet-natured dramedy about faking human connection until you make it, Rental Family provides Brendan Fraser an ideal showcase for his sensitive star power while backing him up with a terrific ensemble." Metacritic, which uses a weighted average, assigned the film a score of 64 out of 100, based on 39 critics, indicating "generally favorable" reviews. Audiences polled by CinemaScore gave the film an average grade of "A" on an A+ to F scale.

Pete Hammond for Deadline calls the movie "sweet and lyrical" and "a gentle film, the kind of lower-key humane comedy we don't see often these days." Dieter Oßwald praises on the German arthouse portal Programmkino.de "the delightful ease with which the film, as both amusing and thought-provoking, explores identity, lies, and loneliness." Fraser seemingly presents himself effortlessly as a believable resilient character with enormous potential for empathy. "He delivers a truly Oscar-worthy performance in a heartwarming crowd-pleaser with depth."

=== Accolades ===
Award	Date of ceremony	Category	Nominee(s)	Result	Ref.
AARP Movies for Grownups Awards	January 10, 2026	Best Intergenerational Film	Rental Family	Nominated	
Artios Awards	February 26, 2026	Feature Studio or Independent – Comedy	Kei Kawamura	Won	
Astra Film Awards	January 9, 2026	Best Actor – Comedy or Musical	Brendan Fraser	Nominated	
Astra Film Awards	January 9, 2026	Best Original Screenplay	Hikari and Stephen Blahut	Nominated	
Astra Film Awards	January 9, 2026	Best Young Performer	Shannon Mahina Gorman	Nominated	
Celebration of Asian Pacific Cinema and Television	November 14, 2025	Director Award	Hikari	Won	
Chicago International Film Festival	October 21, 2025	Spotlight Award	Hikari	Won	
Cinema for Peace Awards	16 February 2026	Cinema for Peace Dove for The Most Valuable Film of the Year	Rental Family	Nominated	
Critics' Choice Movie Awards	January 4, 2026	Best Young Actor/Actress	Shannon Mahina Gorman	Nominated	
Hollywood Music in Media Awards	November 19, 2025	Score – Independent Film	Jónsi and Alex Somers	Nominated	
Middleburg Film Festival	October 20, 2025	Narrative Feature Audience Award	Rental Family	Won (Note: Award shared with Hamnet.)	
National Board of Review	December 3, 2025	Top 10 Films	Rental Family	Won (Note: Award shared with nine other films.)	
Savannah Film Festival	October 29, 2025	Outstanding Achievement in Cinema Award	Brendan Fraser	Won	
Savannah Film Festival	November 3, 2025	Audience Award	Rental Family	Runner-up	
Seattle Film Critics Society	December 15, 2025	Best Youth Performance	Shannon Mahina Gorman	Nominated	
Society of Composers & Lyricists	February 6, 2026	Outstanding Original Score for an Independent Film	Jónsi and Alex Somers	Nominated	
Virginia Film Festival	October 26, 2025	Breakthrough Director Award	Hikari	Won	
Washington D.C. Area Film Critics Association Awards	December 7, 2025	Best Youth Performance	Shannon Mahina Gorman	Nominated	

== See also ==
- Family Romance, LLC
- Peacock (2024 film)
