= Hikari (director) =

Japanese filmmaker (born 1976/1977)

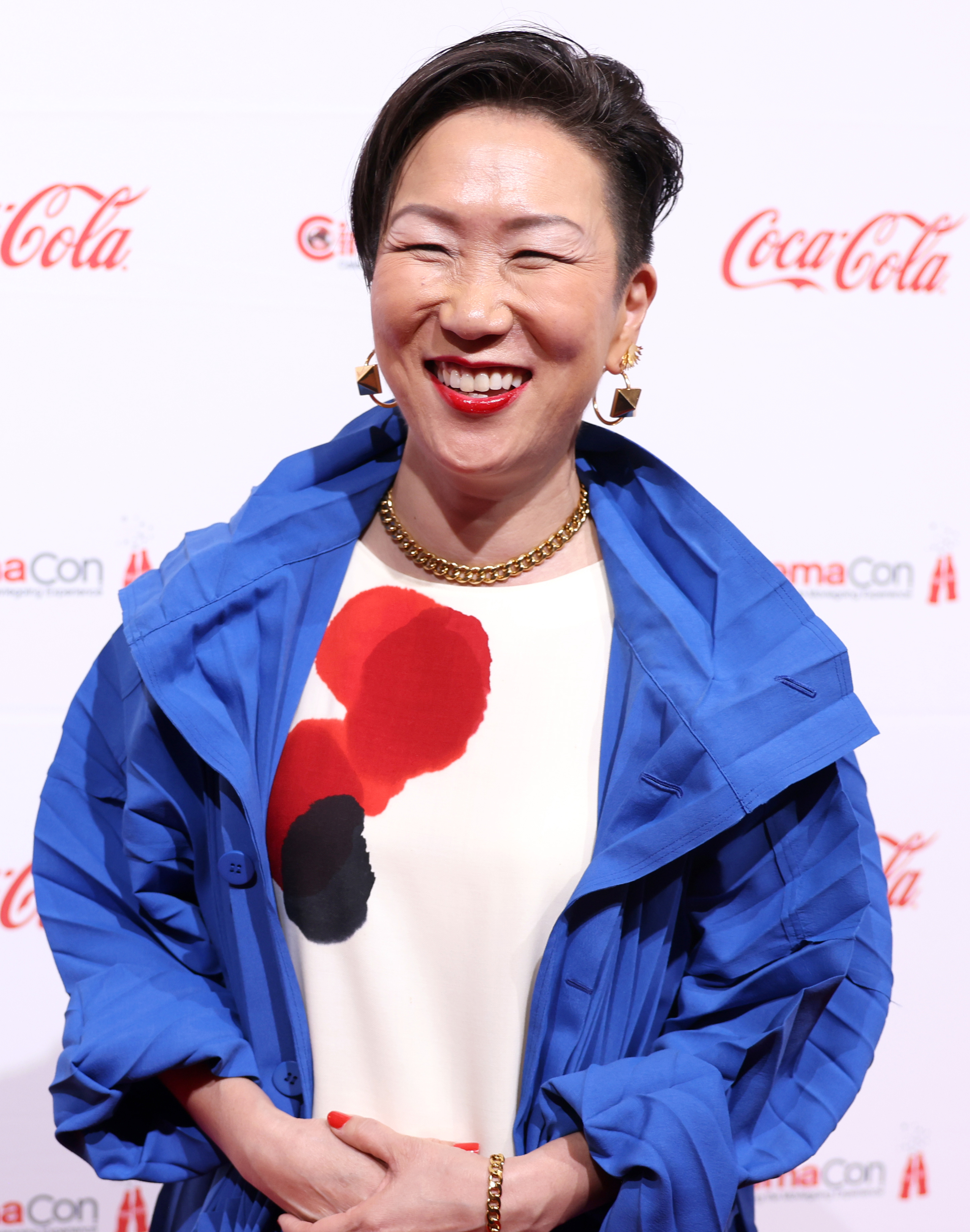
- Hikari in 2026
- Born: Mitsuyo Miyazaki; Osaka, Japan
- Occupation: Filmmaker
- Years active: 2011–present

Mitsuyo Miyazaki (宮崎 光代, Miyazaki Mitsuyo), better known mononymously as Hikari, is a Japanese director, producer, screenwriter, and actress. She is known for the films 37 Seconds (2019) and Rental Family (2025).

== Early life and education ==
Hikari was born Mitsuyo Miyazaki in Osaka. She moved to the United States as an exchange student at the age of 17, and afterwards studied in Utah, graduating with a BSc in Theater Arts, Dance, and Fine Arts from Southern Utah University in 1999.

She moved to Los Angeles upon graduating and worked as an extra and backup dancer in various films, commercials, and music videos, as well as a variety of part-time jobs, including photographing local musicians. At the age of 30 she started studying at the University of Southern California's film school, graduating with an MFA in Film and TV Production in 2011.

== Career ==
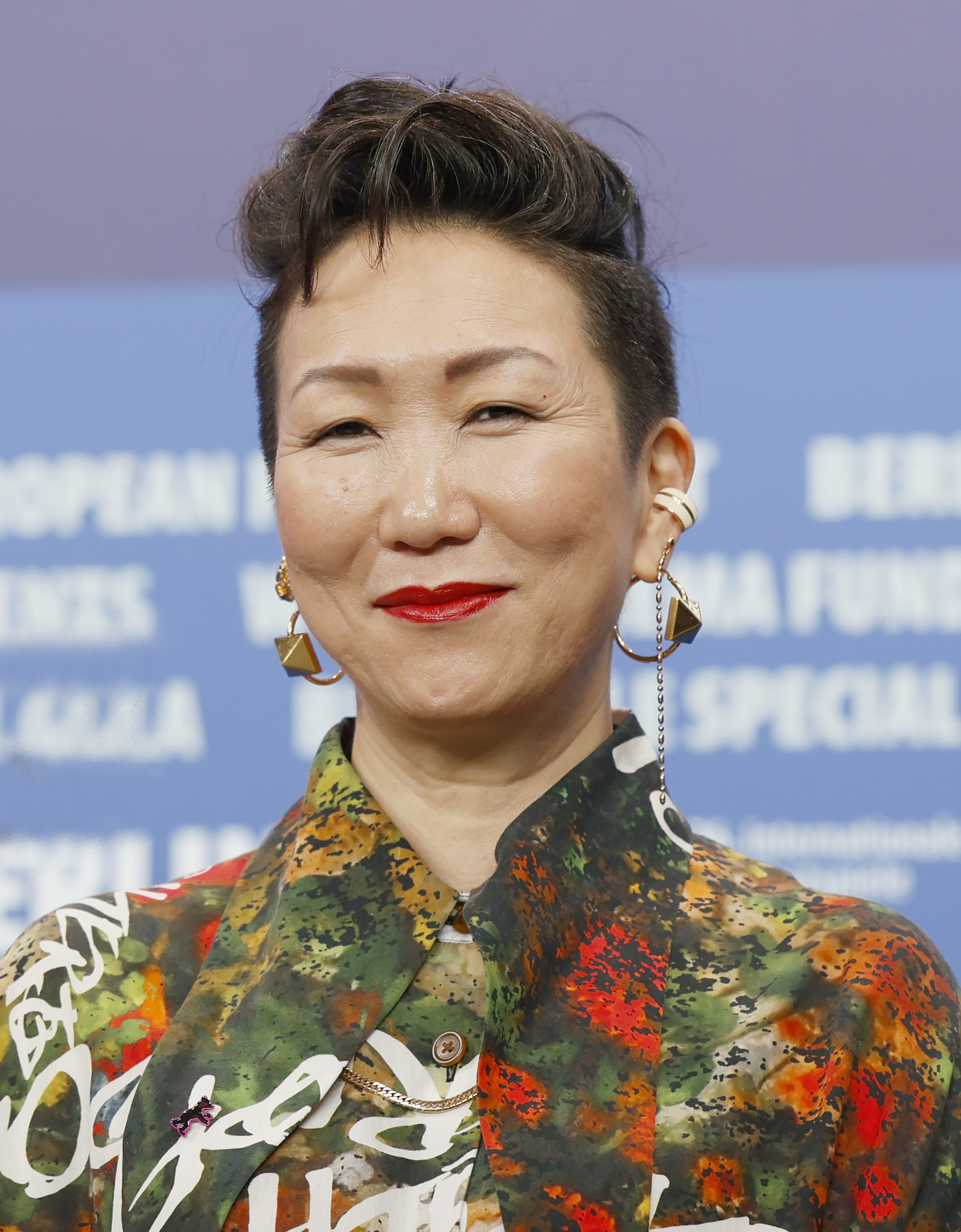
Hikari at the 2026 Berlinale

Hikari's first effort as a filmmaker came when she wrote, directed, and produced the short film Tsuyako (2011), which was shown at more than 100 film festivals around the world, and received 50 awards. She then wrote and directed the short film A Better Tomorrow (2013), which premiered at the 2013 Cannes Film Festival. She followed this by writing, directing, and producing the short film Where We Begin (2015), which premiered at the 2015 Tribeca Film Festival.

She wrote, directed, and produced her feature film debut 37 Seconds (2019) to critical acclaim at the 2019 Berlin International Film Festival. In 2020, author Rainbow Rowell announced on Twitter that the film adaptation of her book Eleanor & Park would be directed by Hikari, though there have been no updates since.

Hikari directed three episodes, including the pilot, of the Netflix comedy-drama series Beef (2023). She co-wrote (with Stephen Blahut) and directed the 2025 comedy-drama film Rental Family (2025), starring Brendan Fraser, Takehiro Hira, and Mari Yamamoto.

In December 2025 Hikari was selected as an international jury member for the 76th Berlin International Film Festival.

== Filmography ==
=== Film ===
Year	Title	Director	Writer	Producer	Notes	Ref.
2011	Tsuyako	Yes	Yes	Yes	Short film	
2013	A Better Tomorrow	Yes	Yes	No	Short film	
2015	Where We Begin	Yes	Yes	Yes	Short film	
2019	37 Seconds	Yes	Yes	Yes		
2025	Rental Family	Yes	Yes	Yes		

=== Television ===
Year	Title	Director	Writer	Producer	Notes	Ref.
2022	Tokyo Vice	Yes	No	No	2 episodes	
2023	Beef	Yes	No	Executive	3 episodes	

== Accolades ==
- 2011: Directors Guild of America Student Award for Best Woman Student Filmmaker, West Region, for Tsuyako
- 2011: Future Filmmakers Award and Audience Award at Palm Springs International ShortFest, for Tsuyako
- 2015: Outstanding Alumnus Award in 2015 by Southern Utah University
- 2019: Panorama Audience Award at the 69th Berlin International Film Festival (37 Seconds)
- 2019: International Confederation of Art Cinemas' Art Cinema Award in the festival's Panorama section
