= Family Romance, LLC =

2019 film by Werner Herzog

- Film poster
- Directed by: Werner Herzog
- Written by: Werner Herzog
- Produced by: Roc Morin
- Starring: Yuichi Ishii; Mahiro
- Cinematography: Werner Herzog
- Edited by: Sean Scannell
- Music by: Ernst Reijseger
- Production company: Skellig Rock
- Distributed by: Mubi
- Release dates: May 18, 2019 (Cannes); July 3, 2020
- Running time: 89 minutes
- Country: United States
- Language: Japanese

Family Romance, LLC is a 2019 Japanese-language American drama film written and directed by Werner Herzog. It stars Yuichi Ishii and Mahiro Tanimoto. The film had its world premiere in the Special Screenings section at the 2019 Cannes Film Festival on May 18, 2019.

== Plot ==
Yuichi Ishii runs a rental family service called Family Romance, which serves as an agency to provide rental people to fill in as husbands, friends or other social roles. In doing so, they aim to fill the gaps in people’s lives helping them through challenging problems.

At the film’s outset, Yuichi is fulfilling a contract where he pretends to be the father of 12-year-old Mahiro. Mahiro, who has no memories of her father, is shy and uncertain of Yuichi but slowly begins to welcome him into her life. As Yuichi gains her confidence, Mahiro’s mother asks for information about what her daughter is thinking and saying. As Yuichi grows closer to Mahiro, he begins to guard her secrets and advocate for more freedoms for her.

In between his visits with Mahiro, Yuichi maintains his business. He accepts jobs and continues to fulfill them without any judgement towards his clients. While he completes his contracts, Yuichi considers the nature of artifice and reality after visiting a hotel staffed by robots. Yuichi confides in a friend that he has been having disturbing dreams of actors portraying samurai committing ritual suicide.

Eventually Yuichi travels with Mahiro’s mother to visit an oracle. During their trip, Mahiro’s mother remarks that she is glad to have him as a friend. This makes Yuichi uncomfortable and after their trip he visits a funeral home where he inquires about the possibility of having actors in coffins.

After another visit with Mahiro where she confesses that she loves him and wants to start spending weekends with him as father and daughter, Yuichi informs her mother that it has become too serious and they need to end their contract. Mahiro’s mother invites him to live with them, but Yuichi refuses and apologizes once more before leaving and suggesting that she rent a funeral for the imaginary father.

Yuichi visits his friend, who consoles him and tells him that he believes Family Romance offers a helpful and meaningful service. Yuichi seems unconvinced and wonders if his own family could be rented people who are faking their emotions for him.

The film closes with Yuichi returning to his own home. As he approaches he hears voices inside and a small set of children’s hands press against frosted glass on the front door. Yuichi hides from the unseen child and slumps next to the door.

== Cast ==
- Yuichi Ishii
- Mahiro Tanimoto

== Production ==
The film casts non-professional actors speaking Japanese. It was shot in the spring and summer of 2018 in Tokyo and Aomori Prefecture, Japan. The production wrapped in August that year. Herzog shot about 300 to 350 minutes of footage in total. The film features music by Ernst Reijseger.

== Release ==
The film had its world premiere in the Special Screenings section at the 2019 Cannes Film Festival on May 18, 2019. It also screened at the 46th Telluride Film Festival and the 24th Busan International Film Festival.

In June 2020, Mubi acquired video-on-demand and television rights to the film in North America, Germany, Latin America (except Brazil), Turkey, Australia, New Zealand, and Japan. The film was screened for free on the streaming service for 24 hours on July 3, 2020.

== Reception ==
On review aggregator website Rotten Tomatoes, the film holds an approval rating of 73% based on 55 reviews, with an average rating of 6.6/10. The website's critics consensus reads: "A fascinating exploration of human connection, Family Romance, LLC sees Werner Herzog following an unconventional path to existentialism." On Metacritic, the film has a weighted average score of 68 out of 100, based on 17 critics, indicating "generally favorable" reviews.

Peter Bradshaw of The Guardian gave the film 3 out of 5 stars, calling it "A strange, faintly frustrating but diverting film." Todd McCarthy of The Hollywood Reporter wrote, "This is minor Herzog, to be sure, but alternately amusing and disarming nonetheless." Peter Debruge of Variety commented that "Not quite 90 minutes, the film might actually be more effective at half the length."

== See also ==
- Rental Family
