= 37 Seconds =

2019 film

- Film poster
- Directed by: Hikari
- Written by: Hikari
- Produced by: Hikari; Peter Maez; Shin Yamaguchi
- Starring: Mei Kayama
- Cinematography: Stephen Blahut; Tomoo Ezaki
- Edited by: Thomas A. Krueger
- Music by: ASKA
- Production companies: Knockonwood; Hikari Films
- Distributed by: Films Boutique; Netflix
- Release date: 9 February 2019 (Berlin)
- Running time: 115 minutes
- Country: Japan
- Language: Japanese

37 Seconds is a 2019 Japanese drama film written and directed by Hikari. The film features actress Mei Kayama, who has cerebral palsy, as 23-year-old Yuma Takada, a talented artist who wants to make her name in manga. A sympathetic magazine editor (Yuka Itaya) tells Takada her art is technically proficient but betrays her lack of worldly experience. Criticizing her depictions of sex as unconvincing, the editor tells the young woman, who uses a wheelchair to get around, to lose her virginity and then return. This sparks a voyage of self-discovery as she rebels against her over-protective mother and seeks out new experiences, trying to assert her budding independence.

The film was screened at the 69th Berlin International Film Festival and won the Audience Award and the International Confederation of Art Cinemas’ Art Cinema Award in the festival's Panorama section.

== Cast ==
- Mei Kayama as Yuma Takada
- Misuzu Kanno as Kyoko Takada
- Shunsuke Daitō as Toshiya
- Makiko Watanabe as Mai
- Yoshiko Kumashino as Kumachino
- Haruka Imou as Yuka
- Toshinori Omi as Furuya
- Minori Hagiwara as Sayaka
- Yuka Itaya as Fujimoto
- Kiyohiko Shibukawa as Pimp
- Eita Okuno as Hide
- Shôhei Uno as Iketani
- Yuri Ono as Editor of Weekly Boom
- Shizuka Ishibashi as Physical Therapist
- Kotaro Torii as Cool Guy
- Daichi Kodaira as Neet
- Moctar D as Cosplayer
- Seiko Ozone as Sayaka's Mother
- Nobu Morimoto as Police Officer
- Nanami Kawakami as Porn Star
- Yoshihisa Gai, Yoshiteru Kawata and Yuya Nagamichi as Gay Bar Staffs
- Ciccone, Sugar Lu and Bouillabaisse as Drag Queens

== Release ==
The film had its world premiere at the Berlin International Film Festival, and also played at the 2019 Tribeca Film Festival and was also screened at the 2019 Toronto International Film Festival in the Contemporary World Cinema section. The international sales company Films Boutique holds the rights, while Netflix holds distribution rights for the United States and Canada.

The film was released by Netflix in Japan on 7 February 2020.
