= Jason Keng-Kwin Chan =

Malaysian actor (born 1971)

- Born: Jason Keng-Kwin Chan; 1 December 1971 (age 54); Kuala Lumpur, Malaysia
- Citizenship: Australian
- Education: University of Western Australia National Institute of Dramatic Arts NIDA
- Occupations: Actor, director, writer, composer
- Years active: 1992–present
- Spouse: Sang Min Lee

Chinese name
- Traditional Chinese: 陳敬權
- Simplified Chinese: 陈敬权
Transcriptions
Standard Mandarin
- Hanyu Pinyin: Chén Jìngquán

Jason Keng-Kwin Chan (born 1 December 1971) is a Malaysia-born Australian actor best known for his role as Cameron Watanabe, the Green Samurai Ranger, as well as his clone, Cyber Cam, in Power Rangers: Ninja Storm. He is co-founder of BananaMana Films, a Singaporean studio that produces Asian dramas in English for global distribution.

== Early life and education ==
Born in Kuala Lumpur, Malaysia, Chan is of Chinese descent and moved to Perth, Western Australia with his family when he was 5 years old. He entered medical school at the University of Western Australia, but continued to pursue the creative arts, studying ballet, contemporary dance, and jazz dance at the Western Australian Academy of Performing Arts. After graduating in 1994, he obtained his Fellowship in General Practice and worked as a general practitioner for three years before, frustrated with the demanding hours and lack of a creative outlet, he left the medical profession. attending the National Institute of Dramatic Art (NIDA) in Sydney, where he obtained a Bachelor of Dramatic Arts in Acting.

== Career ==
Chan was hired as a host of the Australian version of Playhouse Disney. A year later, he was cast in Power Rangers Ninja Storm, which filmed in New Zealand. Faced with choosing one or the other, Chan recalled seeing Mighty Morphin Power Rangers: The Movie and told his agent he wouldn't turn down the opportunity to be a superhero, much less on American television.

Chan moved to Singapore. He met fellow actor Christian Lee, an American, with whom he founded Bananamana Films, a production house specializing in Asian scripted dramas. Since co-founding BananaMana Films, Chan has gone on to write, direct, edit and produce for various projects. The first series he co-wrote, directed, produced and acted in was a web series: What Do Men Want?. However, prior to production the national broadcaster of Singapore asked to have it converted into a full-length TV series and it aired in 2014 as a 13 x half hour Romantic comedic TV drama. Chan and Lee won an outstanding directing in a drama series award at LA Webfest for this drama.

Their second drama Perfect Girl was created as a 10 x 5-8min web series. This series went on to win 7 international awards from 16 nominations. Chan was credited as writer and composer, and shared directing and editing credits.

Chan has co-written, directed and scored a TV pilot Bang Bang Club which won a Platinum REMI award at the Worldfest Houston International Film Festival 2016.P Chan was also nominated for Best Editing and Best Original Score for this project at the Indie Series Awards (LA) 2016.

Chan lives in Singapore.

== Awards and nominations ==
=== Awards ===
- 'Platinum Remi (Houston International Film Fest 2016)
- Outstanding Writing (LA Webfest 2015)
- Outstanding Directing (LA Webfest 2015)
- Outstanding Editing (LA Webfest 2015)
- Outstanding Drama Series (LA Webfest 2015)
- Outstanding Drama (Toronto Webfest 2015)
- Best International Series (Atlanta Webfest 2014)

=== Nominations ===
- Best Editing (Indie Series Awards 2016)
- Best Score (Indie Series Awards 2016)
- Outstanding Lead Actor (LA Webfest 2015)
- Outstanding Cinematography (LA Webfest 2015)
- Triple Threat Auteur (Toronto Webfest 2015)
- Best Overall Series (Toronto Webfest 2015)
- Best Drama (Vancouver Webfest 2015)

== Film ==
Perfect Girl, originally a web series, was picked up as a short feature by global streaming platform VIKI.com.

His feature film credits include: the animated feature Sing to the Dawn. where he played the villain, and The Leap Years in which he plays the role of "Raymond" alongside Ananda Everingham and Wong Li-Lin. He appeared briefly in Candy, an Australian film, as Heath Ledger's doctor and very briefly in "Stealth" as one of the technicians.

He co-wrote, co-produced and co-directed the 2017 cross-cultural food film Jimami Tofu with Christian Lee, where it world premiered and won the Audience Choice Award at the 37th Hawaii International Film Festival.

== Television ==
In 2014, Chan appeared as co-lead in "What Do Men Want?" - a 13 x half hour romantic drama co-created and directed by himself and his business partner Christian Lee. The drama won them both an Outstanding Directing award at LA Webfest 2016 and aired on national TV in Singapore in 2014.

Chan appeared as host of Disney Channel's Playhouse Disney block which aired throughout Australia. In 2003, he then garnered a role as the Green Samurai Ranger, Cameron Watanabe, in the American TV series: Power Rangers Ninja Storm.

In Singapore he has appeared in many Mediacorp Channel 5 and Art Central productions including: My Sassy Neighbour, Six Weeks, Parental Guidance, 9 Lives, Mental and The Secret Lives of Sorry Stars. In Australia he played opposite Jaqueline Macqenzie in Two Twisted.

Chan has also played leads in German telemovies including: Love in the Lion City (2009), The Last Patriarch (2010), A World Beyond (2013) and House of Harmony (2005).

== Theatre ==
In theatre, Chan debuted in the lead role of 'Kevin' in "Connie and Kevin and the Secret Life of Groceries" in Sydney, then continued in Singapore with ‘Chris’ in Action Theatre's “The Admiral’s Odyssey”, Clifford Bradshaw in Toyfactory's "Cabaret", Lysander in SRT's "A Midsummer Night's Dream", Andy in SRT's "The Office Party", Claudio in SRT's "Much Ado About Nothing" and Marc in The Ensemble Theatre's production of "ART".
