= Five-Star Stranger =

2024 debut novel by Kat Tang

- Author: Kat Tang
- Genre: Literary fiction
- Publisher: Scribner
- Publication date: August 6, 2024
- Pages: 240
- ISBN: 978-1668050149

Five-Star Stranger is a 2024 debut novel by Kat Tang, published by Scribner. Involving a high-rated man on a fictitious Rental Stranger app, the novel is based on real-life rental family services in Japan.

== Synopsis ==
The novel follows an unnamed Japanese American male protagonist who has worked on the Rental Stranger app as a "rent-a-stranger" for a decade in New York City imitating various characters on behalf of his clients: boyfriends, in-laws, funeral mourners, and others. One of the man's longest pretend relationships is to Mari, a mother who hired him to be a pretend father to her daughter, Lily. When another client, Darlene, hires him to masquerade as an alcoholic brother and subsequently tries to find out more about his pretend family, however, the man's career is tested.

== Critical reception ==
Huffington Post included the novel on a list of 8 books to read for Asian Pacific American Heritage Month, stating that "Kat Tang's inventive debut novel perfectly captures what it feels like to be lonely and searching for human connection in our modern life of parasocial relationships and contractual experiences."

Kirkus Reviews, in a starred review, admired Tang's "romantic comedy" and called it "A smart look at people-pleasing taken to its illogical extreme." Publishers Weekly called it a "moving and offbeat debut" involving "a memorable character study of a man hiding from himself." Booklist, in a starred review, dubbed it a "stellar debut novel with all-star success."

Associated Press called the novel a "strong debut" thanks to "its cool premise, great descriptions and amazing attention to emotion and relationships". Library Journal called the debut moving, with clean prose that counterbalanced the story's complexity, and concluded: "An emotional character study that doesn't rely on easy answers to complicated questions of identity, isolation, and familial love."

== Rental families ==
In NPR, Tang stated that she came up with the conceit for the novel when she heard about rental families in Japan. Seeing the service as a possible solution to needs pertaining to personal image in Japan, Tang decided to bring it to the United States fictitiously in order to examine what the fundamental needs of American people might be.

After writing the manuscript, Tang went to Japan to rent a father out of her own curiosity for the experience. For two hours, she facilitated conversations with her rental father which she never had with her real father, spurring her to rethink her relationships and the idea of relationships as a whole. She concluded that he did "a great job".
