= Mari Yamamoto =

Japanese actress (born 1986)

- Born: February 4, 1986 (age 40); Japan
- Education: International Christian University
- Occupations: Actress, journalist
- Years active: 2014–present

Mari Yamamoto (born February 4, 1986) is a Japanese actress and journalist who has starred in Pachinko, Monarch: Legacy of Monsters, and Rental Family.

== Early life and education ==
Born in Japan, Yamamoto moved with her family to London in 1991, before eventually returning to live in Tokyo in 1994 at the age of 8. She described the experience as akin to being an outsider, where she'd be considered "very Japanese everywhere in the world" but "wasn’t quite Japanese enough" in Japan itself.

Yamamoto studied international relations at International Christian University in Tokyo, obtaining her Bachelor of Arts. She then moved to New York City to study method acting at the Lee Strasberg Theatre and Film Institute. During this time she was also part of The Bats acting company at The Flea Theater.

== Career ==
=== Journalism ===
Yamamoto returned to Tokyo and began working in journalism, writing articles for The Daily Beast alongside American journalist Jake Adelstein. When Adelstein's book, Tokyo Vice, was adapted into a television series for HBO Max, Yamamoto was recruited to work on the show's writing staff. She became a producer on the series in its second season.

=== Acting ===
In 2022, Yamamoto starred in the recurring role of Hana in the Apple TV+ series Pachinko. That same year she joined the cast of Apple's Monarch: Legacy of Monsters. In March 2024, she was cast to star opposite Brendan Fraser in the film Rental Family.

== Filmography ==
=== Film ===
| Year | Title | Role | Notes | Ref. |
|---|---|---|---|---|
| 2014 | Allure | Hana | | |
| 2015 | Bourek | Fujiko | | |
| 2015 | Sayonara | —N/a | | |
| 2017 | Jimami Tofu | Yuki | | |
| 2021 | Kate | Kanako | | |
| 2025 | Rental Family | Aiko | | |

=== Television ===
| Year | Title | Role | Notes | Ref. |
|---|---|---|---|---|
| 2022–2024 | Tokyo Vice | —N/a | Script consultant (season 1); associate producer (season 2) | |
| 2022 | Pachinko | Hana | Recurring role, 5 episodes | |
| 2023–present | Monarch: Legacy of Monsters | Keiko Miura | Main role, 18 episodes | |

=== Video games ===
| Year | Title | Role | Notes |
|---|---|---|---|
| 2025 | Assassin's Creed Shadows | —N/a | |
