= The River with No Bridge =

- DVD cover
- Directed by: Yōichi Higashi
- Written by: Kim Soo-kil; Yōichi Higashi
- Based on: The River with No Bridge by Sue Sumii
- Produced by: Tetsujirō Yamagami; Kazunobu Yamaguchi
- Starring: Naoko Otani; Tamao Nakamura; Tetta Sugimoto; Atsuro Watabe
- Cinematography: Koichi Kawakami
- Edited by: Osamu Inoue
- Music by: Ernesto Cavour
- Production company: Seiyu Company Ltd.
- Distributed by: Toho
- Release date: May 23, 1992 (Japan)
- Running time: 142 minutes
- Country: Japan
- Language: Japanese
- Box office: ¥1.2 billion

The River with No Bridge (Japanese: 橋のない川, Hepburn: Hashi no nai Kawa) is a 1992 Japanese drama film co-written and directed by Yōichi Higashi, based on the novel of the same name by Sue Sumii. It is the second film adaptation of the novel and stars Naoko Otani, Tamao Nakamura, Tetta Sugimoto and Atsuro Watabe. Toho released the film on May 23, 1992, in Japan, where it was a financial success.

== Premise ==
In the early 20th century, widow Fute (Naoko Otani), her mother Nui (Tamao Nakamura) and her two sons, Seitaro (Tetta Sugimoto) and Koji (Atsuro Watabe), live in the rural town of Komori. Their family belongs to the Burakumin, a marginalized group confined to the area. The story unfolds over several years, from 1908 to 1924. Through the course of their childhood, the boys are continuously tormented by their teachers and classmates as a result of their heritage. However, with the support of their mother and grandmother, they survive and grow into teenagers. As they grow older, their paths slowly diverge. Against the backdrop of the 1918 rice riots in Osaka, Seitaro meets fellow Burakumin Asako (Hiroko Nakajima) and falls in love. Meanwhile, Koji and the townspeople create Suiheisha, an organization dedicated to ending discrimination against their people.

== Cast ==
- Naoko Otani as Fude Hatanaka
- Tamao Nakamura as Nui Hatanaka
- Tetta Sugimoto as Seitaro Hatanaka
  - Cho Tae-yong as Young Seitaro
- Atsuro Watabe as Koji Hatanaka
  - Tetsuya Fujita as Young Koji
- Masato Hagiwara as Sadao Shimura
- Etsushi Takahashi as Munenori Iseda
- Saki Takaoka as Nanae Minemura
- Ai Yasunaga as Machie Sugimoto
- Ren Osugi as Kawashima Kumajiro
- Hiroko Nakajima as Asako Yasui
- Katsuo Nakamura as Tokusaburô Yasui
- Minori Terada as Kôkichi Shimura
- Sakura Kamo as Akane Shimura
- Takuro Tatsumi as Hideaki Murakami
- Kimiko Yoshimiya as Teacher Kashiwagi

== Background ==
Sue Sumii's novel, a story about anti-Burakumin discrimination, was originally serialized in seven parts. It was first published in Buraku, the magazine of the Buraku Mondai Kenkyusho, or Buraku Studies Research Institute. After its success, it was published in hardcover by Shinchosha in 1961. All seven parts were ultimately published by Shinchosha, with the final installment released in 1993. Shinchosha later collected them into a single volume. At the time of her death, Sumii was working on an eighth installment in the series. In total, the series has sold over eight million copies in its home country. An English translated version was published in 1990 (translated by Susan Wilkinson).

A previous two-part film adaptation (River Without a Bridge and River Without a Bridge Part 2) was directed by Tadashi Imai and released from 1969 to 1970.

Director Higashi was asked by the Buraku Liberation League to direct the 1992 adaptation.

== Awards and nominations ==
17th Hochi Film Award

- Won: Best Director - Yōichi Higashi

47th Mainichi Film Awards

- Won: Excellence Film (shared with Original Sin, Tōki Rakujitsu and Seishun Dendeke Dekedeke)
- Won: Best Director – Yōichi Higashi
- Won: Best Art Direction – Akira Naitō

5th Nikkan Sports Film Awards

- Won: Best Director – Yōichi Higashi
- Won: Best Supporting Actress – Tamao Nakamura
