= Sue Sumii =

Japanese social reformer, writer, and novelist (1902–1997)

Sue Sumii 住井 すゑ
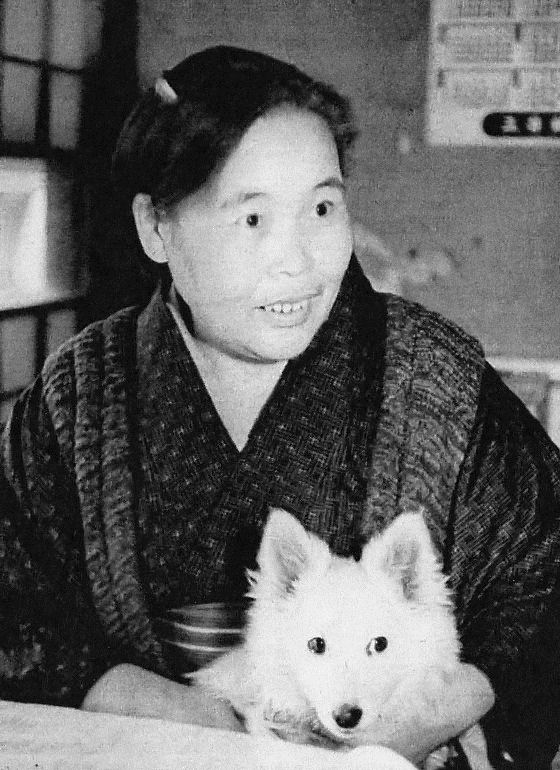
- Born: January 7, 1902 Hirano, Nara Prefecture, Empire of Japan
- Died: June 16, 1997 (aged 95) Ushiku, Ibaraki, Japan
- Education: Haramoto Women's High School
- Notable works: Hashi no nai kawa (橋のない川 "The River with No Bridge")
- Spouse: Shigeru Inuta (m.1921–d.1957)
- Children: two sons, two daughters

Sue Sumii (住井 すゑ, Sumii Sue; January 7, 1902 – June 16, 1997) was a Japanese social reformer, writer, and novelist. She advocated for victims of discrimination, most notably the Burakumin. She is best known for her novel, Hashi no nai kawa (橋のない川; "The River with No Bridge").

== Early life ==
Sumii attended and graduated Haramoto Women's High School, receiving a degree as a teacher. At the age of 18, she moved to Tokyo and worked for the publisher, Kodansha. After a couple of years, Sumii left Kodansha due to discriminatory treatment and working conditions of women.

== Career ==
During the time with her husband and children, Sumii started writing short stories and publishing novels based on the lives of young people associated with nomin bungaku, or the agrarian literature movement. In 1954, her work for Yoake asaake (“Dawn-Daybreak”) was awarded the Mainichi Culture Prize.

In 1957, Sumii's husband died. In the following year, 1958, she began writing the first volume of the seven-part novel Hashi no nai kawa (橋のない川 "The River with No Bridge"), which focused on the fate of the discriminated Burakumin. Her work was first published in Buraku, the magazine of the Buraku Mondai Kenkyusho or Buraku Study Group. After its success, it was then published in hardcover in 1961.

Hashi no nai kawa has sold over eight million copies and has been turned into a film twice, one being the 1992 version directed by Yōichi Higashi. An English translated version, The River with No Bridge, was published in 1992. An Italian translation, Il fiume senza ponti, was published in 2016 by Atmosphere libri.

== Personal life ==
In 1921, Sumii married Shigeru Inuta, a literary activist of the proletarian agrarian movement, which produced “peasant literature,” protecting poor farmers.

In 1935, they moved to Inuta's birthplace, Hitachino, in the Ibaraki Prefecture, where they farmed the land. They had four children; two sons and two daughters.

== Death ==
At the age of 95, Sumii died on June 16, 1997. Before her death she was working on the eighth part of Hashi no nai kawa.
