= Buraku Liberation League =

Burakumin rights group in Japan

- 部落解放同盟, Buraku Kaihō Dōmei
- Flag of the Buraku Liberation League
- Predecessor: Suiheisha (1922–1942); National Buraku Liberation Committee (1946–1955)
- Formation: 28 September 1955 (renamed from BKI)
- Type: Human rights group
- Purpose: Burakumin rights, anti-discrimination
- Location: Japan
- Key people: Matsumoto Jiichirō, Asada Zennosuke
- Affiliations: International Movement Against All Forms of Discrimination and Racism (IMADR)
- Website: http://www.bll.gr.jp/

The Buraku Liberation League (BLL; Japanese: 部落解放同盟, romanized: Buraku Kaihō Dōmei) is one of Japan's largest human rights advocacy groups, dedicated to the liberation of the Burakumin, an outcast group historically subject to discrimination. The BLL's origins trace back to the pre-war Suiheisha (Levellers' Association), and it was officially formed in 1955 after its predecessor, the National Buraku Liberation Committee, changed its name at its tenth conference. Its long-time leader was the politician and businessman Matsumoto Jiichirō, who funded much of the movement's activities.

Closely aligned with the Japan Socialist Party and influenced by Marxist ideology in its early post-war years, the BLL initially framed the Buraku issue as a remnant of feudalism. It employed confrontational tactics such as "denunciation" (kyūdan) to combat individual acts of discrimination and "administrative struggle" (gyōsei tōsō) to pressure the state. A major turning point came in the 1960s with the government's 1965 Dōwa Policy Council Report, which led to the passage of the Special Measures Law in 1969. This development caused a schism in the liberation movement between the BLL and the Japanese Communist Party (JCP), with the BLL's centre of power shifting from Kyoto to Osaka under the leadership of Asada Zennosuke.

Since the 1980s, the BLL has undergone a significant ideological transformation, broadening its focus from a specific struggle for Buraku liberation to a wider campaign for "human rights culture" (jinken bunka). This shift has involved addressing other forms of discrimination, building international solidarity, and establishing cultural institutions like the Liberty Osaka Human Rights Museum. Following the conclusion of the national Special Measures Law projects in 2002, the BLL has continued to advocate for comprehensive anti-discrimination legislation and to address issues such as access to family registers (koseki).

== History ==
=== Predecessors ===
The roots of the Buraku Liberation League lie in the pre-war Suiheisha (Levellers' Association), a grassroots movement founded on 3 March 1922 in Kyoto. The Suiheisha established three fundamental principles: total liberation by its members' own efforts, freedom of occupation and economic freedom, and awakening to human nature to "march towards the perfection of mankind". A key tactic of the Suiheisha was public "denunciation" (kyūdan), in which individuals or institutions thought to have engaged in discriminatory practices were publicly confronted and censured. Led by figures such as Matsumoto Jiichirō, the Suiheisha movement was integrated into the state's war effort during the 1930s and ultimately disbanded in 1942, with some activists publicly burning their flags as a demonstration of their abandonment of left-wing thought.

After World War II, the movement was resurrected. On 19 January 1946, the National Buraku Liberation Committee (部落解放全国委員会, Buraku Kaihō Zenkoku Iinkai), also known as the BKI, was formally launched in Kyoto. The committee's proclamation announcing its formation borrowed heavily from the original 1922 Suiheisha Declaration, signalling a continuation of the pre-war struggle. Matsumoto Jiichirō was elected its chairman. The new committee was closely aligned with Marxist ideology and welcomed members from all pre-war Buraku organizations, as well as non-Buraku people. In 1948, it established a research arm, the Research Institute for the Buraku Problem (RIBP), to consult with Marxist academics like Inoue Kiyoshi on ideological direction.

=== Formation and the 1960s split ===
At its tenth national conference in September 1955, the National Buraku Liberation Committee officially changed its name to the Buraku Liberation League (BLL), believing the new name would have greater mass appeal. The post-war movement was heavily influenced by the activist Asada Zennosuke, who championed confrontational denunciation campaigns. One of the most significant was the "All Romance Incident" of 1951, a campaign against the author and publisher of a magazine story that depicted a Buraku community in Kyoto in a derogatory manner.

The 1960s were a turbulent and transformative period for the BLL. A major ideological schism emerged within the Buraku liberation movement over how to respond to the government's 1965 Dōwa Policy Council Report. This report acknowledged the Buraku problem as originating from the "social status structure" of feudal Japan and became the basis for the 1969 Special Measures Law, which allocated significant government funds for improving conditions in Buraku areas. The BLL, under Asada's influence, viewed the government's intervention as a positive development to be leveraged. In contrast, groups aligned with the Japanese Communist Party (JCP) were critical of the policy, arguing that the report was a "poisoned bean cake" (dokumanjū).

This dispute culminated in an explosive struggle between left-wing intellectuals and Buraku activists, symbolized by the "Culture, Health, and Welfare Assembly Hall Incident" in 1966. Asada Zennosuke, having been voted out of his leadership position in the BLL's Kyoto branch, led a breakaway faction to forcibly occupy the Assembly Hall, which also housed the offices of the RIBP. He declared the RIBP, which had been critical of the Dōwa Policy, a "discriminatory research institute". At the BLL's twentieth conference in October 1965, the JCP-aligned faction lost its influence, and the conflict between the JCP and the Asada-led, JSP-friendly group eventually led to a formal split in the movement in 1970. The BLL's center of power shifted from Kyoto to Osaka, and a rival research institute, the Osaka Buraku Liberation Research Institute, was established in Naniwa in 1969.

=== Shift to human rights culture ===
From the mid-1980s, the BLL began a major strategic and ideological shift, moving away from a narrow focus on Buraku issues and toward a broader concept of "human rights culture" (jinken bunka). This transformation was partly a response to the changing political landscape, as the Special Measures Law was set to expire, and partly a conscious effort by BLL leaders to redefine their movement. According to a BLL representative, this new phase had three distinctive features:

- A move from "partial" to "total" solutions, which included preserving a distinct "Buraku culture" rather than seeking full extinguishment through assimilation.
- Expanding the struggle to address discrimination against other minorities in Japan, such as Zainichi Koreans.
- An embrace of "international responsibility," which involved building solidarity with minority rights movements around the world.

This international focus led to the BLL actively campaigning for Japan's ratification of international human rights treaties, such as the International Convention on the Elimination of All Forms of Racial Discrimination (ratified in 1995). In 1988, it founded the International Movement Against All Forms of Discrimination and Racism (IMADR) to advance its work on the global stage. This new direction is also embodied in the Liberty Osaka (Osaka Human Rights Museum), founded in 1985 as a central institution for promoting human rights culture.

== Ideology and tactics ==
The BLL's ideology has evolved significantly since its formation. Initially, the NCBL and early BLL were heavily influenced by the kōzaha school of Japanese Marxism, which interpreted the Buraku problem as a "feudal remnant" that persisted due to an incomplete bourgeois revolution during the Meiji Restoration. Liberation, in this view, could only be achieved through a proletarian revolution. From the end of the 1960s, it became the BLL's orthodox position that the origins of Buraku discrimination were located in the mid-Edo period.

The League's primary tactics during its early decades were "denunciation" (kyūdan) and "administrative struggle" (gyōsei tōsō). Denunciation, a practice inherited from the pre-war Suiheisha, involves directly confronting individuals, companies, or government bodies accused of discriminatory acts to force a public apology and a commitment to change. Administrative struggle refers to organized campaigns to pressure government bodies to implement policies beneficial to Buraku communities, such as improved housing, infrastructure, and welfare.

Since the 1980s, the BLL's core ideology has shifted to the promotion of "human rights culture." This approach reframes the Buraku issue within a universal struggle for human rights, linking it to the plights of other minorities in Japan and abroad. It emphasizes education, cultural preservation, and building a broad-based civil society movement.

== Relationship with the state ==
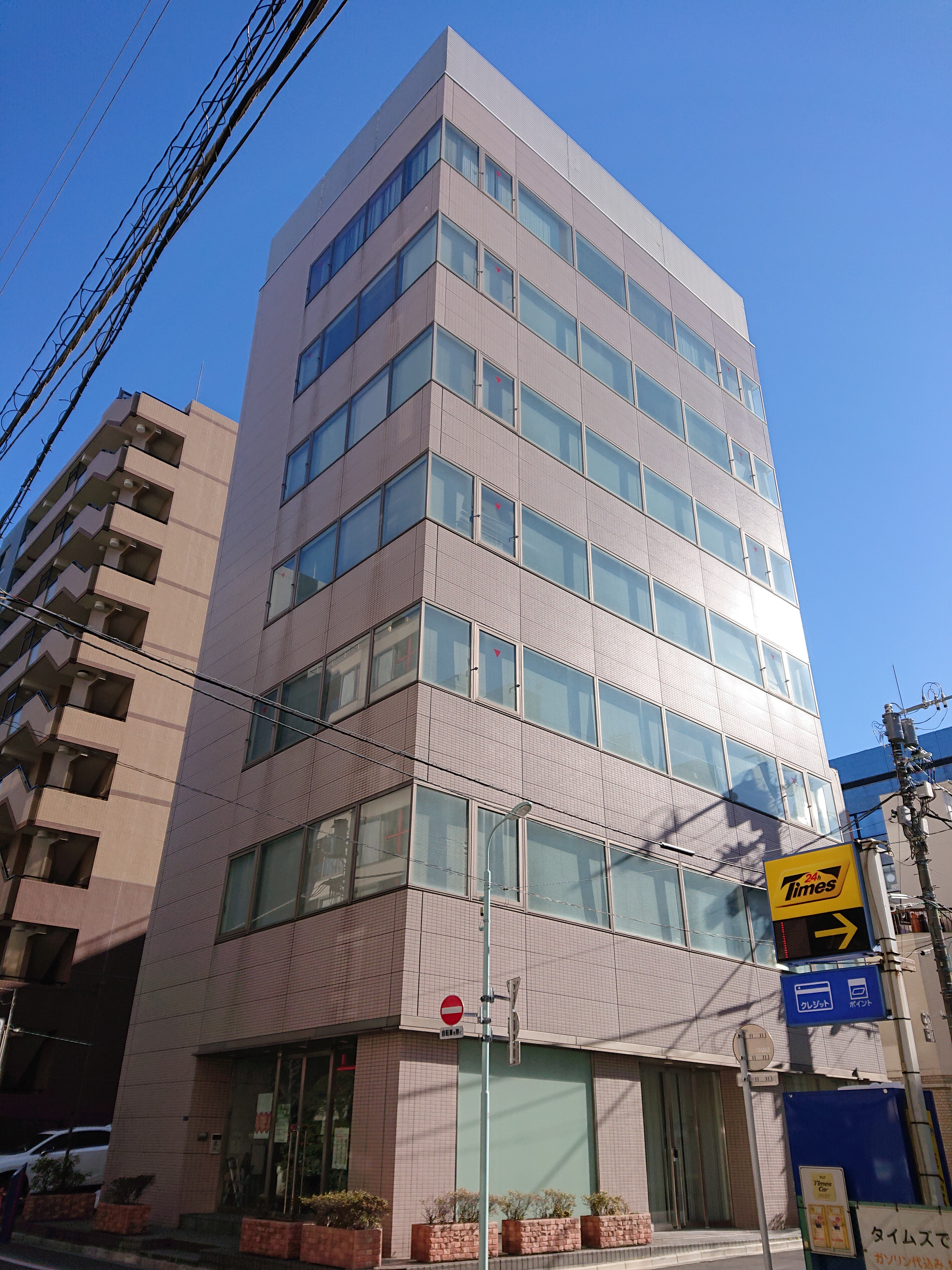
Headquarters of the Buraku Liberation League in Tokyo, 2019

The BLL's relationship with the Japanese state has been complex, oscillating between confrontation and collaboration. Its collaborative yet demanding approach is exemplified by the campaigns of the 1950s and 1960s, which, with support from figures like LDP politician Miki Takeo, successfully pressured the government to address the Buraku issue as a national policy concern. This culminated in the 1965 Dōwa Policy Council Report and the subsequent Special Measures Law (SML), which from 1969 to 2002 authorized massive state investment in Buraku communities.

The BLL viewed these state-sponsored projects as a means to achieve its ends, encapsulated in the view of Matsumoto Jiichirō that "liberation is the end, the projects the means". However, Matsumoto also feared the projects would be a "double-edged sword", improving public hygiene but causing Buraku people to "lose their independent spirit". He also expressed concern that the large sums of money involved would inevitably lead to corruption within both the liberation movement and Buraku communities.

The political scientist Frank Upham has characterized this dynamic as a form of "bureaucratic legal informalism," whereby the state manages civil society groups like the BLL through informal negotiation and financial support, thereby avoiding the enactment of formal, legally binding anti-discrimination legislation. The BLL has consistently campaigned for a comprehensive anti-discrimination law, what Matsumoto termed a "Basic Law", to make discrimination illegal, but such legislation has yet to be enacted.

== Key campaigns and modern activities ==
=== End of the Special Measures Law ===
The SML projects, which began in 1969, were the central arena for BLL-state interaction for three decades. By 1993, an estimated ¥13.880 trillion (over $138 billion) had been spent on Buraku improvement projects, including the construction of schools, clinics, and apartment blocks, and providing generous grants for university attendance. The BLL often exerted significant influence over decisions about construction work and the allocation of grants and housing, which became a point of contention with the JCP, who argued that BLL membership became an unfair criterion for receiving benefits.

As the SML programs were scaled back in the 1990s and finally ceased at the national level in 2002, the BLL's focus shifted. The BLL continued to criticize the government for not fully implementing the 1965 Dōwa report's recommendations and for leaving the Buraku issue unresolved.

=== Advocacy for human rights legislation ===
A consistent demand of the BLL, first articulated by Matsumoto Jiichirō in the 1960s, has been the enactment of a fundamental anti-discrimination law, often referred to as a "Basic Law". The BLL renewed its campaign for such a law in the 1980s, proposing legislation with four key elements:

- A declaratory element stating that the Buraku issue is a responsibility of the state and a matter common to all Japanese citizens.
- An implementation element to create a comprehensive plan guiding specific policies.
- An information element to ensure the dissemination of accurate information about the issue through education and the media.
- A legislative element to address violations of human rights in areas like employment.

Despite decades of campaigning, no such law has been enacted, a situation critics attribute to the state's preference for handling the issue through informal Dōwa project funding rather than legally binding statutes.

Another major campaign focused on restricting access to family registers (koseki). Because these registers could be used to trace a person's Buraku origins, the BLL began demanding in 1967 that access be closed. After the government amended the koseki law in 1976 to prevent free public access, the BLL continued to pressure local governments to pass by-laws making it illegal for private investigators to inquire about a person's status background.

=== International solidarity and 21st-century activities ===
In 1988, the BLL founded the International Movement Against All Forms of Discrimination and Racism (IMADR) to advance its work on the global stage. IMADR was granted consultative status by the United Nations in 1993 and has played a significant role in various activities, including the development of regional policy on the trafficking of women in Asia. Its main office is located in the basement of the Matsumoto Memorial Hall in Tokyo.

The BLL remains active in the 21st century. In July 2006, the Fukuoka prefectural branch, chaired by Matsumoto Jiichirō's grandson Matsumoto Ryū, adopted a new program reflecting contemporary priorities. These included legally establishing human rights, opposing trends toward war and racial exclusionism, and continuing campaigns against specific instances of discrimination. The program explicitly invoked the "Matsumoto spirit", although it also committed to strengthening the constitutional role of the emperor, in contrast to Jiichirō's republicanism. The leadership of the BLL has largely remained with figures connected to Matsumoto, such as Asada Zennosuke who succeeded him, and later Uesugi Saichirō and Kumisaka Shigeyuki, who also identified with Matsumoto's approach to Buraku liberation.

== Cultural and research institutions ==
The BLL has established and influenced numerous cultural and research institutions as part of its activism.

- Buraku Liberation and Human Rights Research Institute (BLHRRI): Originally founded as the Research Institute for the Buraku Problem (RIBP) in 1948, this body has served as the BLL's main research arm. It was renamed in 1998 to reflect the league's broader focus on human rights. The institute, also known as the Buraku Mondai Kenkyūjo (BMK), became the center of theoretical debates within the movement, which sometimes led to conflict with the BLL's main leadership.
- Liberty Osaka: The Osaka Human Rights Museum, known as Liberty Osaka, was founded in 1985 and is the most prominent example of the BLL's "human rights culture" activism. Located in the historic Naniwa Buraku district of Osaka, it serves as a "pedagogical tool" to educate the public about the history of Burakumin and other minority groups in Japan, including Zainichi Koreans, Ainu, and Okinawans.
