= Karl Johannes Eskelund =

Danish journalist and writer

Karl Johannes Eskelund (1918 - 1972) was a Danish journalist and best-selling author who wrote primarily in English.

== Journalism and publications ==
His first book, My Chinese Wife (1945), describes his courtship of and marriage to Chi-Yun Fei, his lifetime companion. Eskelund depicts their lives during the Japanese invasion of China and behind the American lines in China during World War II. His second book, My Danish Father, is an "as told to" biography of his father, Niels Eskelund, dentist to Prajadhipok, King of Siam.

In the 1950s and early 1960s, Eskelund consulted with his publisher on his "travel book projects". They would choose an exotic location unfamiliar to Westerners. Eskelund would research a culture first-hand and write essays about his experiences. With Chi-Yun and their daughter, Mei-Mei, later a Playboy model, the Eskelunds would spend as long as a year exploring a culture as low-budget adventurers.

They lived like ordinary natives, suffering daily hardships and occasional dangers. Eskelund would continue to incorporate his experience, his family, and people he met in his essays. These were painted with his journalist's eye for detail, and colored by his romantic world view and keen sense of social justice.

Eskelund met and interviewed major non-Western political figures, including:

- Sukarno (Indonesian Adventure)
- Jiichiro Matsumoto (Emperor's New Clothes)
- Nkrumah (Black Man's Country)
- Patrice Lumumba (While God Slept)
- Cheddi Jagan (Revolt In the Tropics)
- Mohammad Reza Pahlavi, the Shah of Iran (Behind the Peacock Throne).

Eskelund, known for his quick temper and impulsive behavior, once punched Chiang Ching-Kuo, later the President of Taiwan, in the nose.

Eskelund chronicled the experiences of the extraordinary people he interviewed:

- Kai Arends, a truck farmer and informal expert on the process for making Ecuadorian shrunken heads.
- Perpetual Mountain, a Japanese sumo wrestler who lost a main event because he was "too skinny", weighing "only" 327 pounds.
- Diego Rivera, a Mexican artist whose Rockefeller Center mural was destroyed because it portrayed Karl Marx and Lenin.
- Henry Wong, a Chinese businessman socially ostracized for refusing to denounce his former American business partner.
- "Pedro", who made Eskelund understand the brutal oppression of Portuguese rule in Mozambique.
- Jack, a Filipino Muslim, who brought Eskelund to a village where slavery was openly practiced.

Eskelund's popularity waned as his adventurer persona and book journalism became anachronisms with the emergence of live television coverage during the Vietnam War. Eskelund's own book chronicling the Vietnam War failed to attract an English publisher and two later books suffered a similar fate.

Prone to depression and alcoholism, Eskelund died by self-immolation virtually forgotten. Most of his books, including two bestsellers, are out of print. Twenty years after his death, Chi-Yun, also an author, published a memoir about their stormy and erotic marriage, Min Casanova.

== Reviews ==
Mr. Eskelund's book [My Chinese Wife] is his personal revolt against the social taboos which attempt to ostracize men and women who marry outside their race. It is the author's view that the cultural roots of both Occident and Orient are the same universals feeding the spirit of all humanity".

Son Karl [Eskelund], a lanky, amiable onetime United Press correspondent in China, made the bestseller lists 18 months ago with a variation on the theme called My Chinese Wife. In My Danish Father, he has mixed a frothy mortar of sex and exodontia. Readers are likely to find Dr. Eskelund's love affairs (he married three times and had many mistresses) less picaresque, than his adventures in oral hygiene...

What the author has done [in Vagabond Fever] is to present himself fairly convincingly as one of those persons who were really born to wander - informally, adventurously, and with very little money...Throughout, you have the feeling that the writer and his wife, Chi-yun, are having a good time.

== Books by Karl Eskelund ==
1. My Chinese Wife, Doubleday, 1945
2. My Danish Father, Doubleday, 1947
3. With His Head in His Pocket, Gyldendal, 1949 (Danish only)
4. Dollar Grin and Gravity, Gyldendal, 1950 (Danish only)
5. Vagabond Fever: A Gay Journey In the Land of the Andes, Burke, 1953 (republished Kessinger Publishing, 2007)
6. Her Chinese Family (novel), Gyldendal, 1951 (Danish only)
7. Head Hunting in Ecuador, Burke, 1953 (Vagabond Fever with different photographs)
8. Indonesian Adventure, Burke, 1954
9. Emperor's New Clothes: Travels in Japan, Burke, 1955
10. The Cactus of Love: Travels in Mexico, Taplinger, 1957
11. Black Man's Country: Travels in Ghana, Taplinger, 1958
12. Red Mandarins: Travels in Red China, Taplinger, 1959
13. Forgotten Valley: Travels in Nepal, Taplinger, 1959
14. Drums in Bahia: Travels in Brazil, Alvin Redman, 1960
15. While God Slept: Travels in Africa, Alvin Redman, 1961
16. Black Caviar and Red Optimism: Travels in Russia, Alvin Redman, 1962
17. Revolt in Tropics: Travels in Caribbean, Alvin Redman, 1963
18. Sun, Slaves, and Sinners: Travels in Philippines, Alvin Redman, 1964
19. Uncle Sam's Children: A Trip Through the United States, Gyldendal, 1965 (Danish only)
20. Behind Peacock Throne: Travels in Iran, Alvin Redman, 1965
21. The Wrong War: Travels in Vietnam, Gyldendal, 1966 (Danish only)
22. Quietly Flows the Ganges: Travels in India, Gyldendal, 1967 (Danish only)
23. Midt I En Hashtid, Gyldendal, 1969 (Danish only)

== Books by Chi-Yun Fei Eskelund ==
1. Bamburu, Methuen, 1958
2. Chi-Yun's Kogebog, Vindrose, 1958
3. Chi-Yun's Livretter, Vindrose, 1972
4. Det Var engang i Peking, Gyldendal, 1972
5. Jeg Lever for at Spise, Vindrose, 1980
6. Min Casanova, Vindrose, 1992
