= Kiyoshi Inoue =

Kiyoshi Inoue (井上 清, Inoue Kiyoshi; December 19, 1913 - November 23, 2001) was a Japanese academic, historian, author and professor emeritus of the Kyoto University. He was considered a specialist in modern Japanese history. He was also known as a "progressive historian" and a "Marxist historian."

== Early life ==
Inoue was born in Kochi Prefecture. He studied at the University of Tokyo; and his doctoral thesis was "The History of Modern Reform." He was awarded his Ph.D. in 1936.

== Career ==
In 1954, Inoue joined the faculty of the University of Kyoto as an associate professor at the Institute of Humanities. In 1961, he was named a professor. He continued as a member of the Kyoto faculty until his retirement in 1977.

In his early career, Inoue established himself as a Marxist historian, publishing works on such subjects as the Japanese imperial system and buraku.

In his later years, Inoue worked to expand the number of academic exchanges between Japan and China, and led a movement seeking solidarity with Asian nations. He also published works on the subject of the Diaoyu/Senkaku Islands dispute that sided with the Chinese claim.

Inoue received an honorary degree from the Chinese Academy of Social Sciences in 1997.

== Inoue's views ==
Inoue authored a book (天皇の戦争責任) criticizing the imperial system; and he continued to be critical of the Japanese emperor throughout his life. In a range of topics, his work was often viewed as controversial due to his active protests and lawsuits against the Japanese government. During the Japanese students riots in 1969, Professor Inoue openly supported the students who were demanding the scrapping of the U.S.-Japan Security Treaty.

Inoue was also very critical of "Japanese militarism" in the Diaoyu/Senkaku Islands dispute with China, and had written a number of books on the subject.

== Selected works ==
In a statistical overview derived from writings by and about Kiyoshi Inoue, OCLC/WorldCat encompasses roughly 100+ works in 200+ publications in 6 languages and 1,000+ library holdings.

Books

- 日本女性史 (1948)
- 明治維新 (1951)
- 天皇制 (1953)
- 新版日本の軍国主義 (1953)
- 条約改正: 明治の民族問題 (1955)
- 日本近代史 (1956)
- 日本の歴史 (1963)
- 日本帝国主義の形成 (1968)
- 天皇の戦争責任 (1975)
- 釣魚列島的歷史和主權問題 Diaoyu Dao - Li Shi Yu Zhu Quan (1972)
- Senkaku Letto/Diaoyu Islands - The Historical Treaties (1972)

Journals

- Japanese Militarism & Diaoyutai (Senkaku) Island - A Japanese Historian's View. Historical Research, February 1972.

== See also ==
- History of Japan
- Japanese politics
