= Yakuza Zessyō =

1970 film directed by Yasuzo Masumura

- Film poster
- Directed by: Yasuzo Masumura
- Written by: Jūgo Kuroiwa
- Screenplay by: Keiichiro Ryu
- Based on: Nishi Naruyama Hotel Gake no Hana
- Produced by: Hiroaki Fujii
- Starring: Shintaro Katsu; Masakazu Tamura; Naoko Otani
- Cinematography: Setsuo Kobayashi
- Music by: Hikaru Hayashi
- Distributed by: Daiei Film
- Release date: July 11, 1970 (Japan)
- Running time: 92 minutes
- Country: Japan
- Language: Japanese

Yakuza Zessyō (Japanese: やくざ絶唱) also known as Ode to the Yakuza is a 1970 Japanese film directed by Yasuzo Masumura. Katsu and Masumura worked together for the first in 5 years. It is based on Jūgo Kuroiwa's novel Nishi Naruyama Hotel Gake no Hana. The movie depicts a man's unusual love for a younger sister.

Tatematsu Minoru is a Yakuza in Shinjuku. He has younger sister Akane. Akane comes to like Yuji but Minoru threatens Yuji to break up with Akane. Because Minoru loves his younger sister abnormally.

== Cast ==
- Shintaro Katsu as Tatematsu Minoru
- Masakazu Tamura as Inumaru Yuji
- Naoko Otani as Tatematsu Akane
- Yoshi Katō as Inumaru Yasusuke
- Yūsuke Kawazu as Kaizuka Shigetarō
- Chikara Hashimoto as Kiyama
- Kiwako Taichi as Kanae
- Sei Hiraizumi as Hisai
