= Naoko Otani =

Japanese actress

- Born: April 3, 1950 (age 75); Sumida, Tokyo, Japan
- Occupation: Actress

Naoko Otani (大谷直子, Ōtani Naoko; born April 3, 1950 in Sumida, Tokyo) is a Japanese actress. She made her screen debut in The Human Bullet while still a high school student, and became popular for her role in the NHK Asadora television programme Nobuko to Obāchan (信子とおばあちゃん, Nobuko and Grandmother) in 1969.

She published a collection of nude photos while pregnant. She has been married twice.

== Filmography ==
=== Film ===
Date	Title	Role	Notes
1968	The Human Bullet		
1970	Yakuza Zessyō		
1972	Zatoichi at Large		
1974	The Rapacious Jailbreaker	Kazuko	
1978	Torakku Yarō - Ichibanboshi Kita e Kaeru	Madonna	
1980	Zigeunerweisen		Lead role
1992	The River with No Bridge	Fude Hatanaka	Lead role
1999	Will to Live	Bar proprietor	
2007	Dear Friends		
2012	Land of Hope	Chieko Ono	
2021	Peaceful Death		

=== Television ===
Date	Title	Role	Notes
1969–70	Nobuko to Obāchan	Nobuko Komiyama	Lead role, Asadora
1974	Katsu Kaishū	Jun	Taiga drama
1974	Unmeitōge		
1979	Kusa Moeru	Maki no Kata	Taiga drama
1983	Ōoku	Lady Kasuga	
2014	Gunshi Kanbei	Dota Gozen	Taiga drama
