= Suiheisha =

Japanese human rights organization (1922–1942)

- 全国水平社, Zenkoku Suiheisha
- Suiheisha flag, featuring a crown of thorns (ibara) on a black background
- Successor: Buraku Liberation League
- Formation: 3 March 1922
- Dissolved: 20 January 1942
- Type: Human rights organization Social movement
- Purpose: Burakumin liberation, anti-discrimination
- Headquarters: Kyoto, Japan (1922–1924); Osaka, Japan (1924 onwards)
- Chairman: Minami Umekichi (1922–1924); Matsumoto Jiichirō (1925–1942)
- Key people: Sakamoto Seiichirō; Saikō Bankichi; Komai Keisaku
- Publication: Suihei Shimbun

The Zenkoku Suiheisha (Japanese: 全国水平社, lit. "National Levelers' Association") was a Japanese human rights organization founded on 3 March 1922 to advocate for the liberation of the Burakumin, an outcast group subjected to discrimination. Launched in Kyoto in the liberal atmosphere of the Taishō era, the Suiheisha was the first national organization formed by the Burakumin to protest discrimination. It was preceded by smaller, government-sponsored improvement movements known as Yūwa (conciliation), but the Suiheisha distinguished itself by rejecting government assistance and advocating for self-liberation through direct action protest campaigns known as kyūdan (denunciation).

The movement grew rapidly, establishing a national network and a newspaper, the Suihei Shimbun. Its ideology evolved from a broad human-rights focus to an engagement with leftist political theories, particularly anarchism and Bolshevism. This led to internal factional struggles throughout the 1920s, which, combined with increasing government repression under the Peace Preservation Law, brought the organization to the brink of collapse by the early 1930s.

The Suiheisha was revived in 1933, spurred by a successful national campaign against a discriminatory court ruling and the development of a new, coherent theory of liberation known as Buraku Iinkai Katsudō (Buraku Committee Activity). This strategy linked local, practical demands for improved living conditions with a broader political struggle. However, under the rising tide of militarism and nationalism in the late 1930s, the Suiheisha's leadership gradually abandoned its leftist positions. The organization began cooperating with the government's Yūwa policy and supporting the war effort. It was formally ordered to dissolve in January 1942 and was absorbed into the state-controlled Dōwa Hōkōkai (Dōwa Public Service Group). Despite its dissolution, the Suiheisha's two-decade history of activism and theoretical debate provided a critical foundation for the post-war Buraku Liberation League.

== Background ==
=== Burakumin in pre-war Japan ===
The Burakumin are a Japanese minority group who are descendants of the outcast communities of the Tokugawa period (1603–1868), principally the eta and hinin. Historically, these groups were associated with occupations considered impure in Shinto and Buddhism, such as leatherworking, butchery, and handling the dead. During the Tokugawa period, the government enforced a rigid social hierarchy, formalizing the Burakumin's outcast status through legal restrictions on their dress, residence, and social interactions.

On 28 August 1871, the Meiji government issued the Emancipation Declaration, which legally abolished the titles of eta and hinin and granted the former outcasts the status of "new commoners" (shinheimin). However, the declaration did not include measures to integrate the group into Japanese society or address the deep-seated prejudice against them. Discrimination continued in marriage, employment, and education, and the government's modern family register system made it easy to identify individuals of Burakumin descent, facilitating their exclusion. Stripped of their traditional occupational monopolies and facing social ostracism, most Burakumin lived in impoverished, segregated communities and experienced living conditions far below those of the majority population. By the early 20th century, the Burakumin population was estimated by the government to be around one million, or approximately 1.5% of the total population of Japan.

=== Early improvement movements ===
In the early 20th century, a number of small, local self-improvement movements known as kaizen undō emerged within Buraku communities. Inspired by the liberal ideas of the Meiji era, these groups, often led by wealthier Burakumin, aimed to achieve social acceptance by improving their communities' living standards and moral conduct. One of the most prominent was the Bisaku Heiminkai, founded in Okayama Prefecture in 1902 by Miyoshi Iheiji.

In response to the emergence of these autonomous groups and the perceived threat of socialism, the government initiated its own program, known as the Yūwa ("conciliation" or "harmony") policy. Beginning around 1908, the government encouraged the formation of Yūwa groups, supervised by local officials and police, which aimed to promote patriotism and social harmony while providing limited funding for community improvement projects. These early movements, while doing little to end discrimination, helped to create a network of communication between Buraku communities and fostered a growing consciousness of their shared identity and the injustice they faced.

== Founding (1919–1922) ==
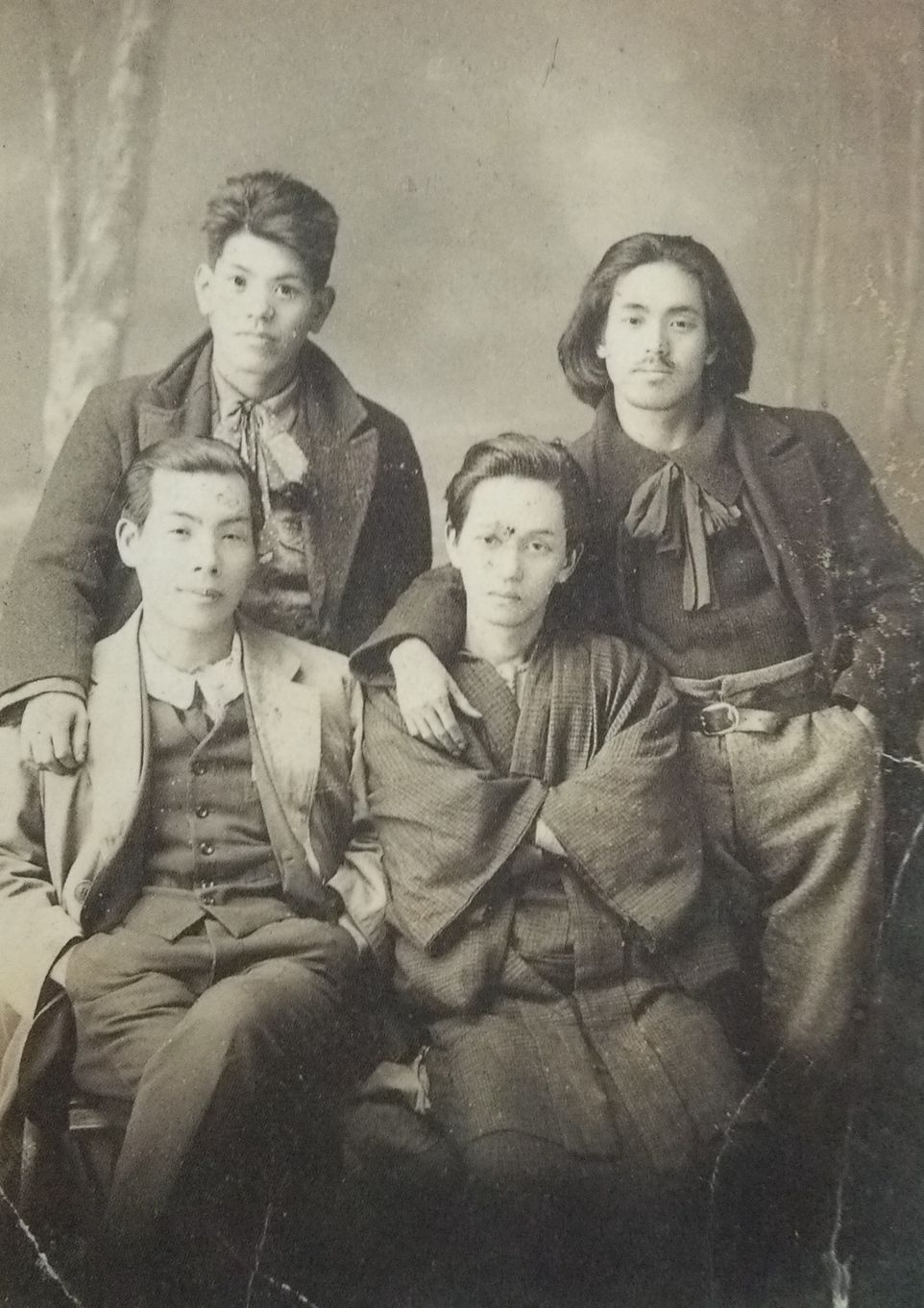
The founders of the Suiheisha, 1922. From left to right: Sakamoto Seiichirō, Kusukawa Yoshihisa, Saikō Bankichi, and Hirano Shoken.

The social and economic turmoil following World War I created a fertile environment for social activism in Japan. The 1918 rice riots, a series of nationwide violent protests against the rising price of rice, demonstrated the potential for mass discontent, while the Russian Revolution inspired the growth of leftist movements. In the spring of 1919, three young men from a Buraku community in Nara Prefecture—Sakamoto Seiichirō, Saikō Bankichi (pen name of Kiyohara Kazutaka), and Komai Keisaku—formed a discussion group called the Tsubamekai (Swallow Club). Sakamoto and Saikō had been exposed to socialist and anarchist thought while studying in Tokyo and were seeking a means to escape discrimination. A turning point came in July 1921 with the publication of an article by the socialist thinker Sano Manabu. Sano argued that Burakumin liberation could not be achieved through government philanthropy but required an autonomous organization that would fight for its own rights while allying with the broader proletarian movement.

Inspired by Sano's ideas, Sakamoto and Saikō immediately travelled to Tokyo to meet with him. Upon their return, they began organizing a national movement. They named their organization the "Zenkoku Suiheisha" (National Levelers' Association), a name suggested by Sakamoto, who later learned of the 17th-century English Levellers. They established an office in November 1921 and, with the help of influential activists such as Minami Umekichi in Kyoto and Hirano Shoken in Tokyo, began publicizing their plans for a founding conference.

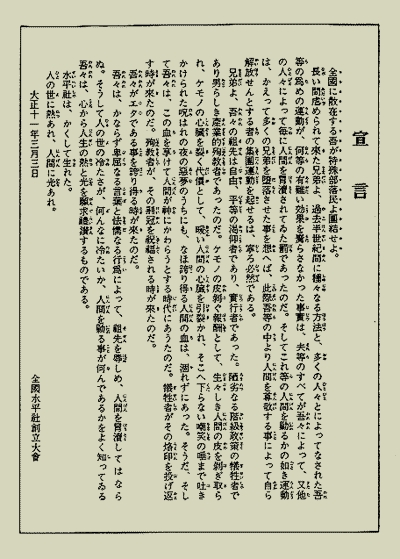
Suiheisha Declaration

The inaugural conference of the Suiheisha was held on 3 March 1922 at the Okazaki Public Hall in Kyoto, attended by approximately 3,000 delegates from across the country. The conference unanimously approved the Suiheisha Declaration (Sengen), written primarily by Saikō, which became a foundational document for the Buraku liberation movement. It rejected the "pity and charity" of the Yūwa movements and called for self-emancipation, stating:

Tokushu Burakumin throughout the country, unite! Long-suffering brothers: ... The time has come when the martyr's crown of thorns will be blessed. The time has come when we can be proud of being Eta. ... From this the Levellers' Society is born. Let there now be warmth and light among men!

The conference also adopted three resolutions: to censure any person who used discriminatory language, to establish a national headquarters and a periodical, and to demand a frank opinion on the movement from the Hongan-ji temples, the Jōdo Shinshū sect to which most Burakumin were affiliated. Minami Umekichi was elected as the first chairman of the organization.

== Early activities and ideological struggles (1922–1926) ==
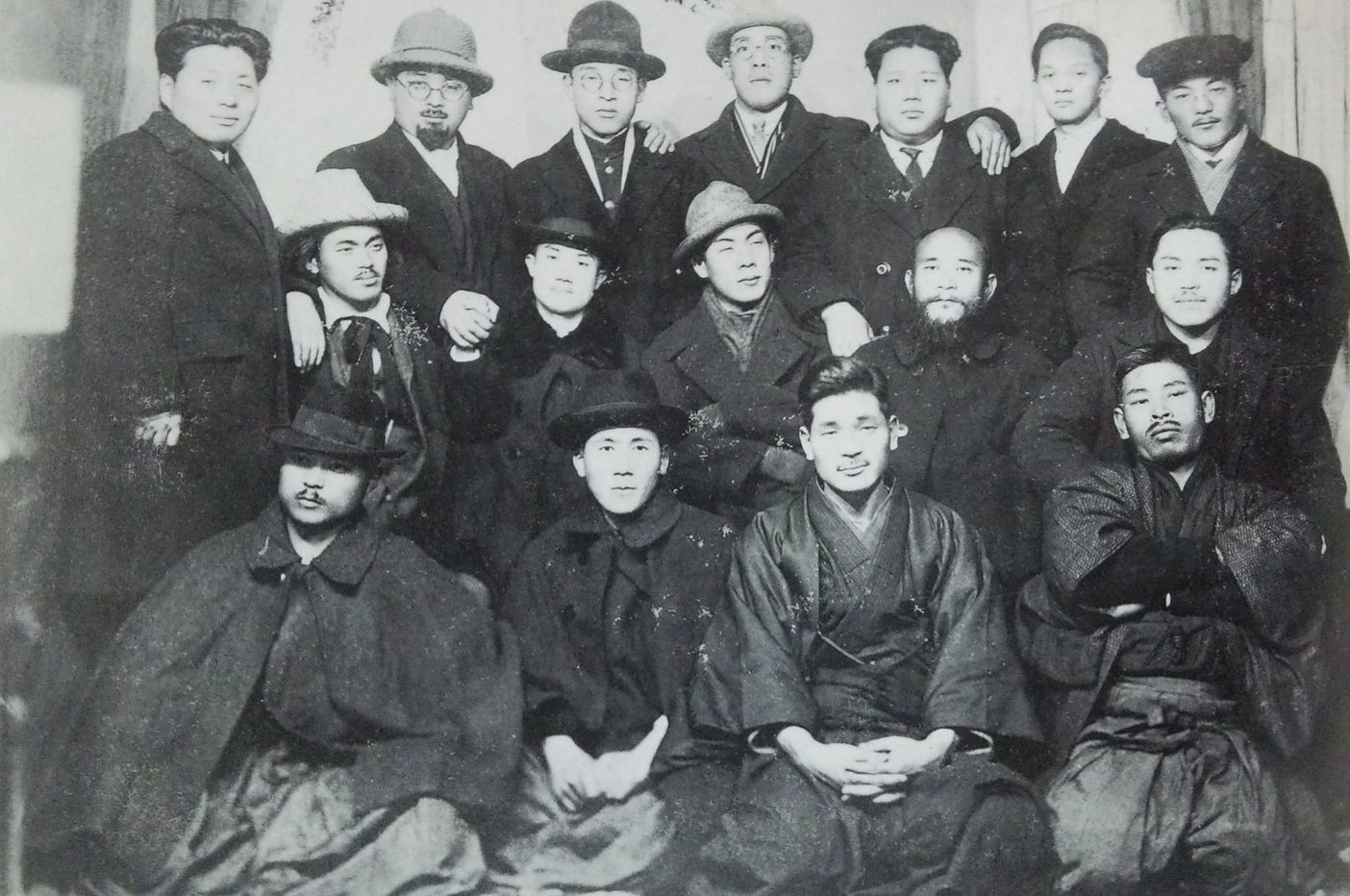
Suiheisha leaders at the Third National Conference, 1924

The Suiheisha expanded rapidly in its first few years, with its primary activity being the kyūdan toso (denunciation struggle). This was a form of direct-action protest in which individuals or groups who committed acts of discrimination—from using slurs to denying service—were publicly confronted and forced to apologize. These campaigns, often initiated by local members without central direction, served to raise consciousness and assert the dignity of the Burakumin.

One of the most significant early incidents occurred in 1923 in the village of Serada, Gunma Prefecture. After a non-Burakumin villager used a discriminatory term, the local Suiheisha demanded an apology. The dispute escalated, and on 18 January, a mob of over 1,000 villagers attacked the small Buraku community of 22 households. The local police failed to intervene, and the subsequent trial resulted in light sentences for the attackers, reinforcing the Burakumin's sense of injustice.

From its inception, the Suiheisha contained diverse ideological currents. At its second national conference in 1923, a debate arose over whether to support the campaign for universal manhood suffrage. The motion was rejected, with syndicalist-influenced delegates arguing that direct action, not parliamentary politics, was the path to liberation. Tensions grew between the anarchist faction, which emphasized local autonomy and humanist ideals, and the Bolshevik faction, which advocated for a centralized organization and a class-based struggle in alliance with other proletarian groups. These ideological conflicts were exacerbated by a "spy scandal" in 1924. Matsumoto Jiichirō, a prominent leader from Fukuoka, was arrested for allegedly plotting to assassinate Prince Tokugawa. The information was revealed to have come from a spy who had infiltrated the movement's leadership, leading to the expulsion of several moderate and anarchist-leaning leaders, including Hirano Shoken and Minami Umekichi.

== Radicalization and crisis (1926–1932) ==
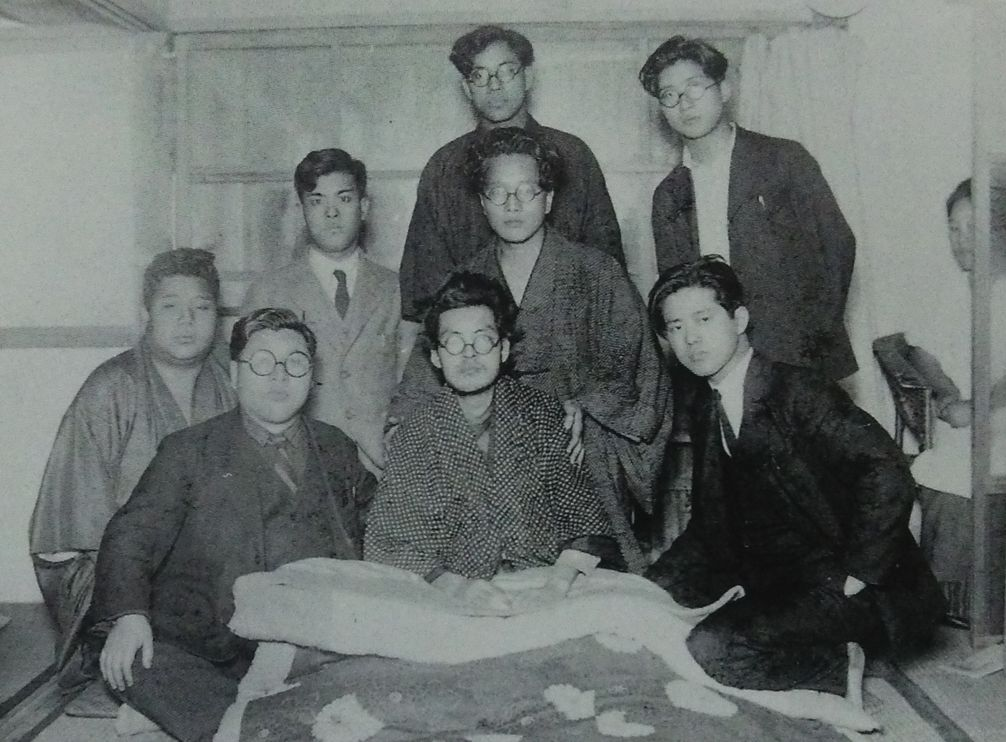
Suiheisha members, 1931

By the fourth national conference in May 1925, the Bolshevik faction, led by Matsumoto Jiichirō, had gained ascendancy. The conference adopted a new, hierarchical organizational structure based on democratic centralism and elected Matsumoto as chairman. This marked a decisive shift toward a more radical, class-oriented political line.

This new radicalism found its most potent expression in the Fukuoka Regiment Incident of 1926. After several Burakumin conscripts in the Imperial Japanese Army's 24th Fukuoka Regiment faced repeated discrimination, the local Suiheisha launched a major protest campaign. The campaign linked the issue of discrimination within the military to the broader anti-militarist sentiment growing in Japan and gained support from other leftist groups. The army's refusal to address the issue and its eventual cancellation of a negotiated meeting led to widespread protests. The government responded with force. In November 1926, police arrested Matsumoto, Kimura Kyōtarō, and nine other campaign leaders, alleging they had plotted to bomb the regimental headquarters. All were convicted, and Matsumoto was sentenced to three years in prison.

The state's response to the Fukuoka incident was part of a wider crackdown on leftist movements. The mass arrests of suspected communists in the March 15 incident of 1928 and in April 1929 devastated the leadership of the Japanese Communist Party (JCP) and its allied organizations, including the Suiheisha. With many of its most energetic leaders imprisoned, the Suiheisha fell into disarray.

The crisis was deepened by the "dissolution controversy" of 1931–1932. Influenced by the Comintern's latest political theses, which argued that the primary struggle in Japan was against a "semi-feudal" system, a group of young Marxist activists led by Asada Zennosuke and Kitahara Daisaku argued that the Suiheisha should dissolve itself. They contended that its focus on "status" was a distraction from the fundamental class struggle and that its members should individually join worker and peasant organizations. The proposal caused a bitter internal division, pitting the "dissolutionist" faction against the headquarters group led by Matsumoto (from prison) and his allies, who argued for the movement's continued existence. By the end of 1932, the movement was paralyzed by infighting and on the verge of financial collapse.

== Revival and new theory (1933–1937) ==
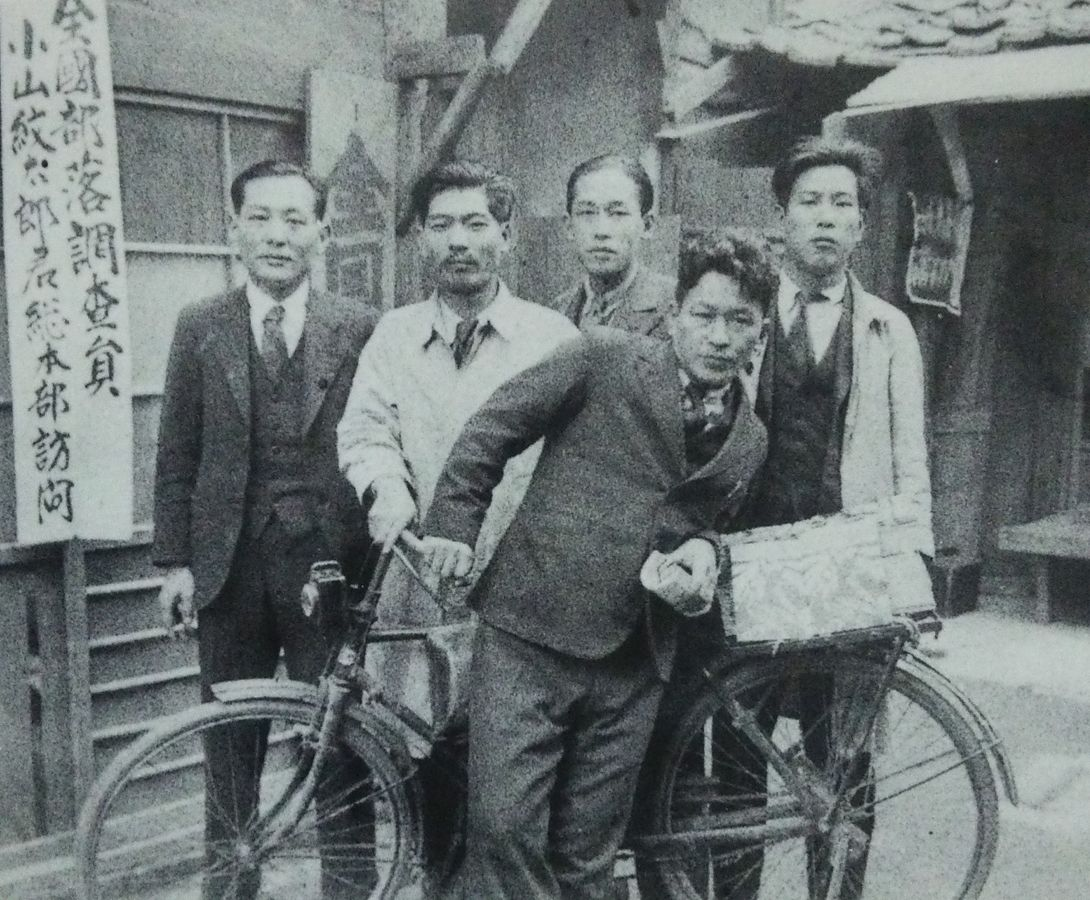
Suiheisha members, 1934

The Suiheisha was revived by a national protest campaign launched in 1933 following a discriminatory court ruling in Takamatsu. Two Burakumin stepbrothers had been convicted of abducting a woman after the court ruled that their failure to disclose their "special status" was a key element of deception. The Suiheisha argued that this decision effectively nullified the 1871 Emancipation Declaration and launched a nationwide campaign demanding the verdict be overturned. The campaign, which linked the court case to local community demands and the broader struggle against fascism, successfully mobilized mass support and united the movement's warring factions. In December 1933, the Ministry of Justice issued a statement acknowledging the discriminatory nature of the ruling, and the two men were released from prison.

The campaign's success was guided by a new theoretical framework known as Buraku Iinkai Katsudō (Buraku Committee Activity). Developed by Kitahara Daisaku following the abandonment of the dissolution proposal, this strategy advocated for the formation of committees (iinkai) in every Buraku community. These committees would address the immediate, practical needs of residents—such as housing, health, and employment—while simultaneously using these struggles to raise political consciousness and link them to the long-term goal of overthrowing the "Emperor-centered capitalist system". This new theory provided a coherent and practical strategy that resolved the earlier tension between reformist demands and revolutionary goals.

The Suiheisha entered a period of renewed growth. Its newspaper, the Suihei Shimbun, was re-launched in November 1934, and the movement became increasingly active in local politics and in demanding that government Yūwa funds be used for genuine community improvements. The organization's focus shifted from denouncing individual acts of prejudice to tackling the structural and economic roots of discrimination.

== Turn to nationalism and dissolution (1937–1942) ==
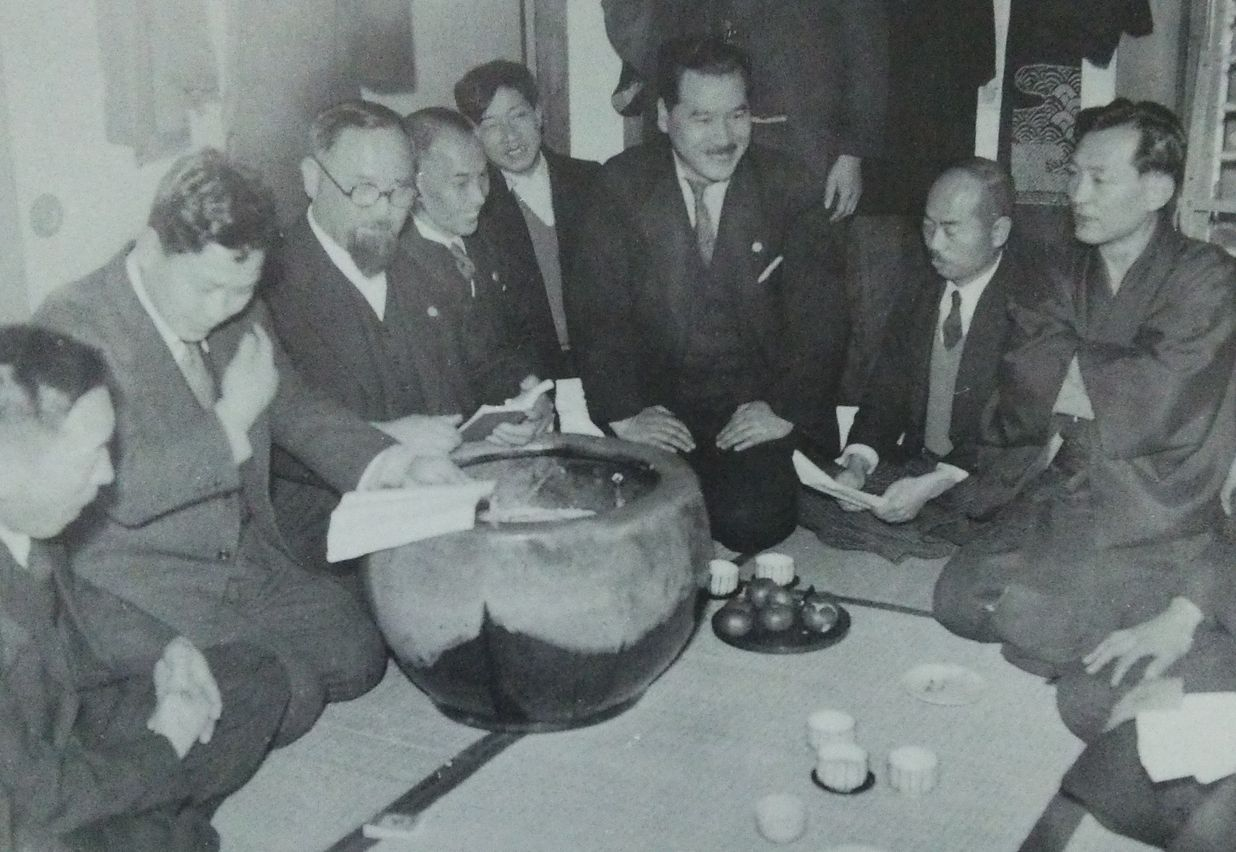
Suiheisha members, 1938

The outbreak of the Second Sino-Japanese War in 1937 and the rise of militarism placed intense pressure on all leftist and liberal organizations in Japan. The Suiheisha, while initially critical of the war, gradually shifted its position toward cooperation with the state. This was partly a result of government repression and partly a reflection of the phenomenon of tenkō (ideological conversion), through which many former leftist leaders publicly renounced their previous beliefs and embraced nationalism. Prominent Suiheisha leaders, including its founder Saikō Bankichi, underwent tenkō and began advocating for an Emperor-centered state socialism, arguing that the war in China was a war of liberation for the Asian races.

At its 14th national conference in March 1937, the Suiheisha revised its founding principles, abandoning the clause on "class consciousness" and resolving to "protect and extend our human rights and freedom...and achieve the absolute liberation of the oppressed Buraku". By 1938, the organization was openly supporting the war effort and the government's policy of national mobilization. The distinction between the Suiheisha and the government's Yūwa movement blurred, and the two began to cooperate on local projects.

Internal divisions persisted, with a new faction led by former Yūwa activists and nationalist converts criticizing Matsumoto's leadership as too "liberal" and advocating for the movement to dissolve and merge into a new national patriotic organization. In the summer of 1940, with the formation of the Imperial Rule Assistance Association (IRAA) signaling the end of independent political activity, the Suiheisha's rival factions agreed in principle to dissolve. In June 1941, the Yūwa administration was formally reorganized as the Dōwa Hōkōkai (Dōwa Public Service Group), an organ of the IRAA. The Suiheisha was officially designated a shisō kessha ("thought group") and ordered to disband, which it did formally on 20 January 1942.

== Legacy ==
For nearly two decades, the Suiheisha was one of Japan's most persistent and radical social movements. Its initial achievement was to provide an outlet for organized protest against discrimination, forcing the government to expand its Yūwa policies and provide more funding for the improvement of Buraku communities. Through its kyūdan campaigns, it established the principle that discrimination should not be tolerated and fostered a sense of self-respect and solidarity among Burakumin.

The Suiheisha also made a significant contribution to the development of democratic thought and practice in pre-war Japan. By organizing outside the state structure and challenging established social norms, it provided a space for radical ideas and forced other liberal and socialist movements to confront the issue of minority rights. Although it ultimately succumbed to the pressures of wartime nationalism, its long history of struggle and the sophisticated theoretical debates it conducted, particularly in the 1930s, provided a deep well of experience for the post-war liberation movement. The leaders, tactics, and theories of the Suiheisha were central to the revival of the movement and the formation of the Buraku Liberation League in 1946.

== See also ==
- Human rights in Japan
