= Liberty Osaka =

Human rights museum in Osaka, Japan

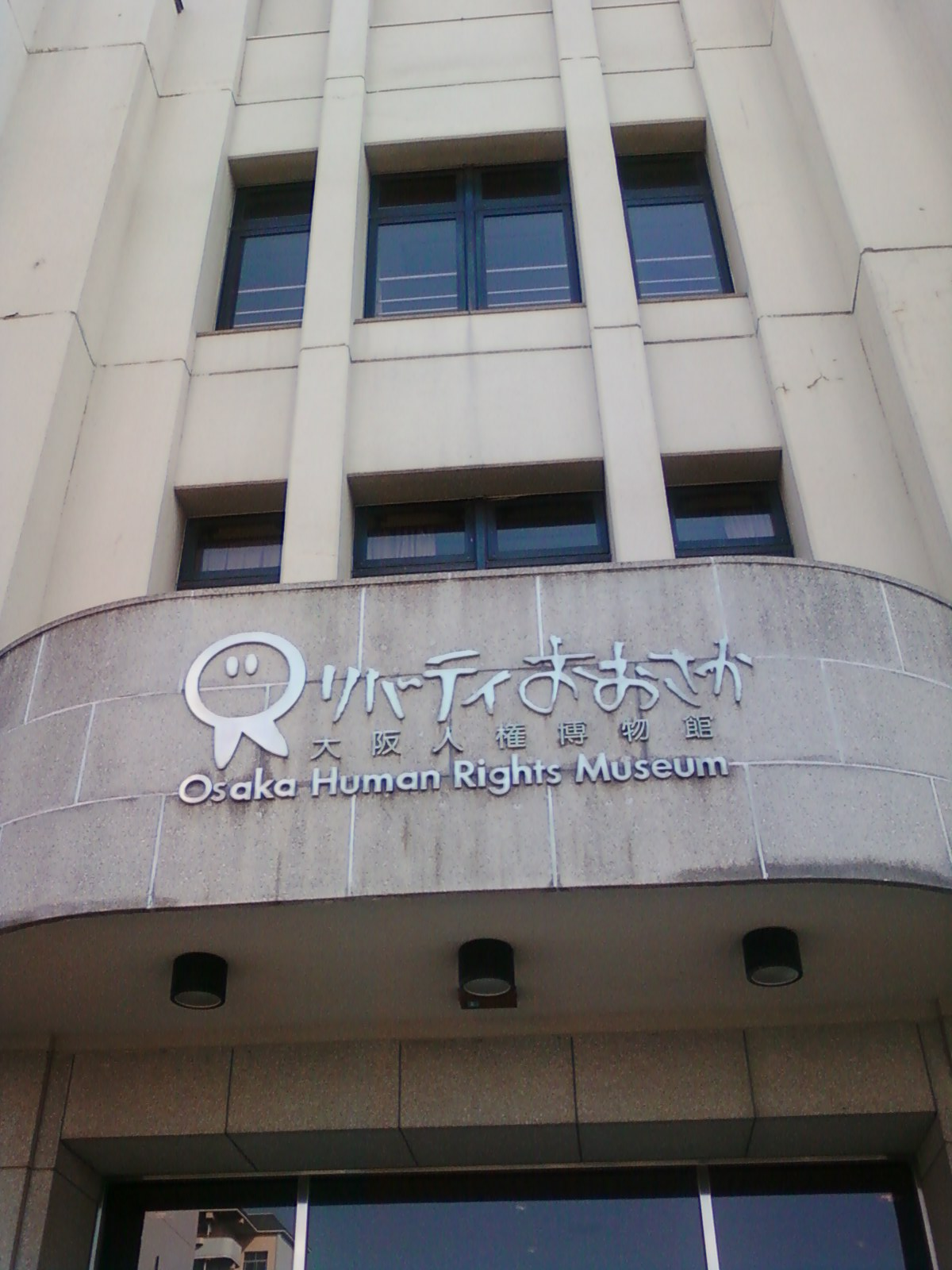
Liberty Osaka

Liberty Osaka (formerly the Osaka Human Rights Museum) was a museum dedicated to human rights situated in Naniwa-ku, a ward in south Osaka City. As the first general museum dedicated to human rights in Japan, the focus of its permanent exhibits was the history of the struggle against discrimination experienced by the nation's minority ethnic groups; the Burakumin, the Ainu of Hokkaidō, the Ryukyuans of Okinawa and Japan's communities of Korean and Chinese descent. There were also exhibits dedicated to discrimination issues affecting women, lesbians, gays, bisexuals, and transgender people, the physically challenged, and the survivors of the atomic bombing of Hiroshima and Nagasaki (hibakusha). Founded in December 1985 to document the history of the Osaka human rights movement, it was relaunched in December 1995 as the Osaka Jinken Hakubutsu-kan (Human Rights Museum).

== Admission ==
Entrance was ¥250 and ¥150 for college and high school students and ¥500 and ¥300 respectively for special exhibits. Entrance was free for elementary and middle school students, senior citizens aged 65 and over, and physically challenged individuals, also from 4 to 10 December ("Human Rights Week", established after Human Rights Day). Audio guides were available in both Japanese and English.

The museum was open from 10:00 a.m. – 5:00 p.m.; last entrance was at 4:30 p.m. It was closed every Monday (except on public holidays), days following a public holiday, the 4th Friday of the month and New Year's Day. The nearest train stations were Ashiharabashi and Imamiya (Osaka Loop Line).

== Closing ==
The museum closed on 31 May 2020, because Osaka city authority demanded the return of leased land based on the museum’s unprofitability, low public benefit, and decreasing of visitors. The museum was planning to reopen the museum at a different location in 2022, however the plan was later abandoned. In March 2023 the museum announced it would donate 30,000 materials to the Osaka Metropolitan University in order for the materials to be used and exhibited in human rights education and research.
