= Ryu Matsumoto =

Japanese politician (1951–2018)

- 松本 龍
- Official portrait, 2010

Minister of the Environment
- In office 21 September 2010 – 27 June 2011
- Prime Minister: Naoto Kan
- Preceded by: Sakihito Ozawa
- Succeeded by: Satsuki Eda

Member of the House of Representatives
- In office 19 February 1990 – 16 November 2012
- Preceded by: Tadashi Kawano
- Succeeded by: Takahiro Inoue
- Constituency: Former Fukuoka 1st (1990–1996); Fukuoka 1st (1996–2012)

Personal details
- Born: 17 May 1951 Fukuoka, Japan
- Died: 21 July 2018 (aged 67) Fukuoka, Japan
- Party: Democratic
- Other political affiliations: JSP (1990–1996); SDP (1996); DP (1996–1998)
- Parent: Eiichi Matsumoto (father)
- Relatives: Jiichirō Matsumoto (grandfather)
- Education: Chuo University

Ryu Matsumoto (松本 龍, Matsumoto Ryū; 17 May 1951 – 21 July 2018) was a Japanese politician of the Democratic Party of Japan, a member of the House of Representatives in the Diet (national legislature).

== Early life ==
Matsumoto was a native of Fukuoka, Fukuoka and graduated from Chuo University.

== Political career ==
Matsumoto was elected to the House of Representatives for the first time in 1990 as a member of the Japan Socialist Party. He followed in the steps of his grandfather Jiichirō Matsumoto and father in command of the Buraku Liberation League. He was vice-chairman Buraku Liberation League when he advocated suppression of free speech.

== Controversy ==
Matsumoto resigned from the post of the Minister of Reconstruction and from the vice-chairmanship of the Buraku Liberation League after making harsh and abrasive criticism of the two governors from the area affected by the Great East Japan earthquake as well as threatening to ruin the career of any journalists who reported his remarks. He later apologised and then blamed his behaviour on his Fukuoka background and also on his B-blood type, a popular superstition in Japan.

Matsumoto's was criticised for his intimidation of journalists when he told them that "Your company is over if you publicize my remarks" as the essence of the liberation alliance.

== Death ==
He died of lung cancer on 21 July 2018, at the age of 67.

Political offices
Preceded by Sakihito Ozawa	Minister of Environment; 2010–2011	Succeeded by Satsuki Eda
Preceded by Hiroshi Nakai	Minister of State for Disaster Management; 2010–2011	Succeeded by Tatsuo Hirano
Preceded by Taku Yamasaki; Yanosuke Narazaki; Seiichi Ōta; Takenori Kanzaki; Tadashi Kawano	Representative for Fukuoka's 1st district (multi-member); 1990–1996; Served alongside: Taku Yamasaki, Hirotarō Yamasaki, Takenori Kanzaki, Seiichi Ōta, Yanosuke Narazaki	District eliminated
New district	Representative for Fukuoka's 1st district 1996–2018	Vacant
