= Jiichirō Matsumoto =

Japanese politician and Buraku activist (1887–1966)

- 松本 治一郎
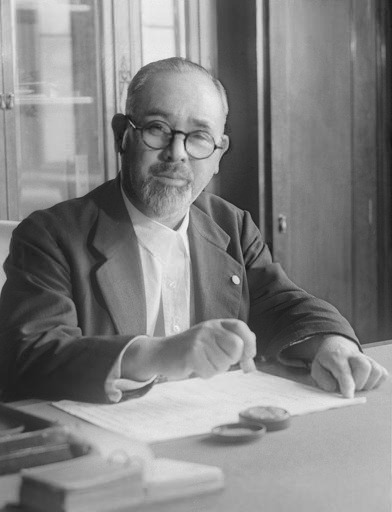
- Matsumoto in 1947

Vice President of the House of Councillors
- In office 20 May 1947 – 24 February 1949
- President: Tsuneo Matsudaira
- Preceded by: Muneyoshi Tokugawa (as Vice President of the House of Peers)
- Succeeded by: Kisaku Matsushima

Member of the House of Councillors
- In office 3 May 1953 – 22 November 1966
- Preceded by: Multi-member district
- Succeeded by: Mitsuru Kitamura
- Constituency: National district
- In office 3 May 1947 – 24 February 1949
- Preceded by: Constituency established
- Succeeded by: Multi-member district
- Constituency: National district

Member of the House of Representatives
- In office 21 February 1936 – 18 December 1945
- Preceded by: Multi-member district
- Succeeded by: Constituency abolished
- Constituency: Fukuoka 1st

Personal details
- Born: 18 June 1887 Chikushi, Fukuoka, Japan
- Died: 22 November 1966 (aged 79) Fukuoka, Japan
- Resting place: Aoyama Cemetery
- Party: Socialist
- Other political affiliations: Suiheisha; Shakai Taishūtō (1936–1940); IRAA (1940–1945); LSP (1951–1955)
- Relatives: Ryu Matsumoto (grandson)

Jiichirō Matsumoto (Japanese: 松本 治一郎, Matsumoto Jiichirō; 18 June 1887 – 22 November 1966) was a Japanese politician, businessman, and social activist who was a prominent leader of the Buraku liberation movement. Born into a Burakumin community in Fukuoka Prefecture, Matsumoto dedicated his life to combating discrimination, earning the title "father of Buraku liberation" (部落解放の父, buraku kaihō no chichi). His career spanned from the pre-war Taishō period through Japan's post-war reconstruction, making him a key figure in the struggle for minority rights and social justice.

Matsumoto's activism was financially supported by a successful construction company he founded, which also provided employment for many Burakumin. In the 1920s, he rose to national prominence as the leader of the Suiheisha (Levellers' Society), the first nationwide organization dedicated to ending Buraku discrimination. His confrontational tactics against discriminatory practices by individuals and state institutions led to several prison sentences. First elected to the Imperial Diet in 1936, he was an early and consistent opponent of Japanese militarism.

After World War II, Matsumoto became a central figure in the left wing of the newly formed Japan Socialist Party (JSP). Elected to the new House of Councillors in 1947, he served as its first Vice-President. An outspoken republican, he caused a national sensation by refusing to perform the deferential "crab walk" ritual before Emperor Hirohito at the opening of the Diet, an act seen as a powerful symbol of the new democratic era. Briefly purged from public office by the American occupation authorities in 1949, he re-emerged in the 1950s as a leading activist in the international peace movement, advocating for Japanese neutrality and forging connections with leaders across Asia.

Throughout his career, Matsumoto remained the undisputed leader of the Buraku liberation movement. He was instrumental in compelling the Japanese government to formally address the issue of discrimination, which led to the creation of the 1965 Dōwa (assimilation) policies, the cornerstone of post-war government efforts to resolve the Buraku issue. He died in 1966, leaving a political dynasty that continued through his grandson, Ryu Matsumoto.

== Early life and career ==
Jiichirō Matsumoto was born on 18 June 1887 in the Buraku community of Kanehira, just outside the city of Fukuoka. He was the fifth and final child in a poor family that made a living from farming and producing components for traditional footwear. He attended a primary school composed entirely of Buraku children, but when he moved to the integrated Sumiyoshi Upper Primary School at age eleven, he began to directly experience discrimination from teachers and other students. Being large for his age, he often fought back and usually won, which gave him a lasting sense of confidence and the importance of resistance. A formative incident occurred when he was twelve; after local police unjustly arrested his father and him following a dispute in their village, Matsumoto came to view the authorities as enemies of the weak.

After graduating from primary school, he attended evening classes while helping his parents, and at sixteen he organized a "Patriotic Volunteer Group" (Giyūdan) to demand more autonomy for the village youth group from the village elders. He later moved to Kyoto and then Tokyo to continue his education but left school after a fight with a student who insulted him.

=== Sojourn in China ===
In 1907, at the age of 20, Matsumoto avoided military conscription and traveled to Dairen (Dalian) in the Japanese-controlled Kwantung Leased Territory. He worked briefly as a journalist and post office clerk before finding it more lucrative to sell cigarettes to sailors. He then teamed up with a journalist, Tomoda Seika, and traveled through the Chinese interior of Shandong. To support themselves, they posed as medical practitioners, selling Western medicines under a banner that read "Greater Japan First Class Medical Officer".

This three-year experience is viewed in different ways. Sympathetic accounts see it as a formative period where he witnessed firsthand the mistreatment of Chinese people by Japanese and Europeans, deepening his anti-imperialist sentiments. A more critical perspective, notably from historian Kim Jung-mi, argues that his actions demonstrate collaboration with Japanese imperialism and a sense of superiority over the Chinese people. Matsumoto himself later stated that he went to China to find an "independent world" free from the discrimination he faced in Japan. He was eventually expelled from China for not having a medical license and returned to Fukuoka in June 1910.

=== Matsumoto-gumi ===
Upon his return to Japan, Matsumoto was jobless, but in 1904 his older brother Jishichi had founded a small construction company, the Matsumoto-gumi. Jiichirō joined the firm, which was well-positioned to benefit from Fukuoka's rapid expansion in the 1910s. The company won major contracts, including for the construction of tram lines for the local electric railway company, whose director, Yasuzaemon Matsunaga, became a lifelong friend and patron of Matsumoto. The company was formally registered as a civil engineering firm on 27 May 1916, with Jiichirō as its representative.

The Matsumoto-gumi became the source of the wealth that funded Jiichirō's political activities and the Buraku liberation movement for decades. He kept it as a private company rather than a joint-stock company, allowing him the freedom to use its funds for political causes, a practice that reportedly caused friction with his brother, who was more focused on the business itself. The company was a major employer of labor from Buraku communities and often hired Chinese and Korean workers, with Matsumoto insisting that they all eat together without discrimination.

== Pre-war activism and political career ==
Matsumoto became involved in local activism after his return from China. In 1910, he organized a protest against the extension of a streetcar line through a pine grove that his community had traditionally been tasked with protecting. An incident in June 1916, in which the Hakata Mainichi newspaper published a discriminatory article about the local Buraku communities, led to a mass protest and the storming of the newspaper's offices. Although not directly involved, Matsumoto was profoundly affected by the event and the subsequent arrest of 306 men from the community. He later stated that this incident taught him the necessity of organized collective action against discrimination. In 1921, he led a successful public campaign against a special tax imposed on the citizens of Fukuoka to celebrate the 300th anniversary of the ruling Kuroda clan, arguing that the feudal clan had been responsible for the institutional discrimination against Burakumin and others.

=== Leadership of the Suiheisha ===
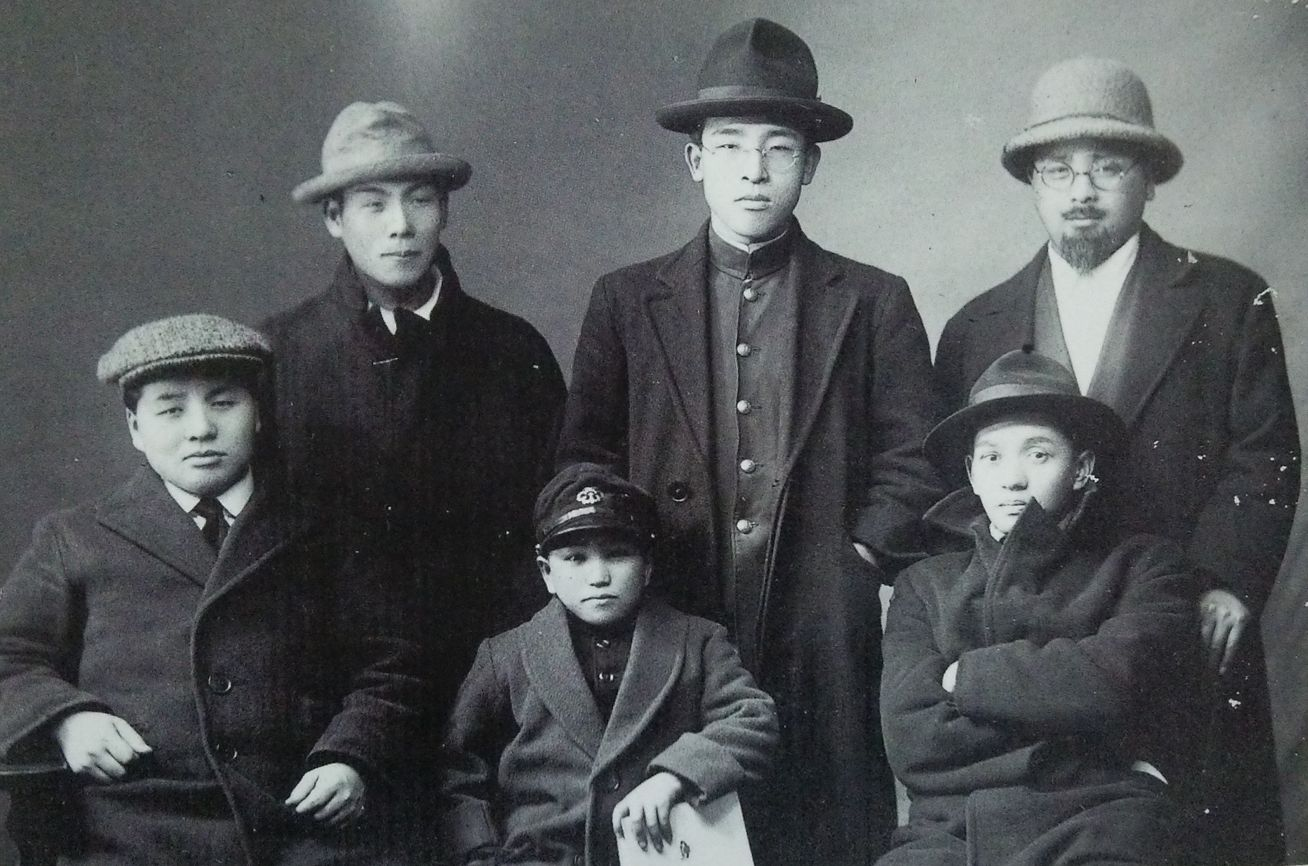
Matsumoto (back right) with other Suiheisha leaders, 1924

In March 1922, the National Levellers' Society, or Suiheisha, was founded in Kyoto as Japan's first nationwide organization for Buraku liberation. News of the organization spread quickly, and in July 1922, Matsumoto spoke about it at a meeting in Fukuoka. He rapidly became the central figure of the movement in Kyushu, and on 1 May 1923, he organized the founding conference of the Kyushu Suiheisha, which was attended by over 2,000 people. He was elected its leader. However, he was arrested just before the conference and held for 62 days in connection with a violent clash between the Matsumoto-gumi and a rival construction company that had resulted in a death. Although he was not present at the incident, he was held as the "boss" responsible for his employees' actions. This experience solidified his "five vows": to renounce drinking, smoking, women, wearing ties, and gambling.

In 1924, Matsumoto initiated a national campaign demanding that Prince Tokugawa Iesato, President of the House of Peers, resign his title. Matsumoto argued that the Tokugawa clan, as the architects of the feudal status system, were the "bosses of robbers" and that the continued existence of the aristocracy was incompatible with the equality of all Japanese people. This was a thinly veiled critique of the emperor system itself, which had incorporated the Tokugawa into the new nobility. After the prince refused to meet him, one of Matsumoto's associates, Satō Saburō, was arrested with a knife and gun near Tokyo Station. Matsumoto and another activist, Matsumoto Gentarō, were arrested in Fukuoka on charges of plotting to assassinate the prince. Gentarō died in custody, which the Suiheisha claimed was the result of ill-treatment. Matsumoto was eventually sentenced to a short prison term for his involvement.

In 1925, the national Suiheisha leadership was in turmoil after it was revealed that its leaders had been compromised by a police spy. Matsumoto, known for his radical stance and financial independence, was chosen as the new chairman of the national central committee, a position he would hold for the rest of his life. He was seen as a moderating figure who could unite the movement's competing factions, which included nationalists, anarchists, and Marxists. In 1926, he became deeply involved in a major protest against discrimination within the 24th Fukuoka Regiment of the Imperial Japanese Army, a campaign that linked the Buraku liberation movement with the broader anti-militarist proletarian movement. This campaign ultimately led to his arrest in November 1926 on charges of conspiracy to bomb the regimental barracks. He was sentenced to three and a half years in prison and began his sentence in May 1929.

== Dietman and World War II ==
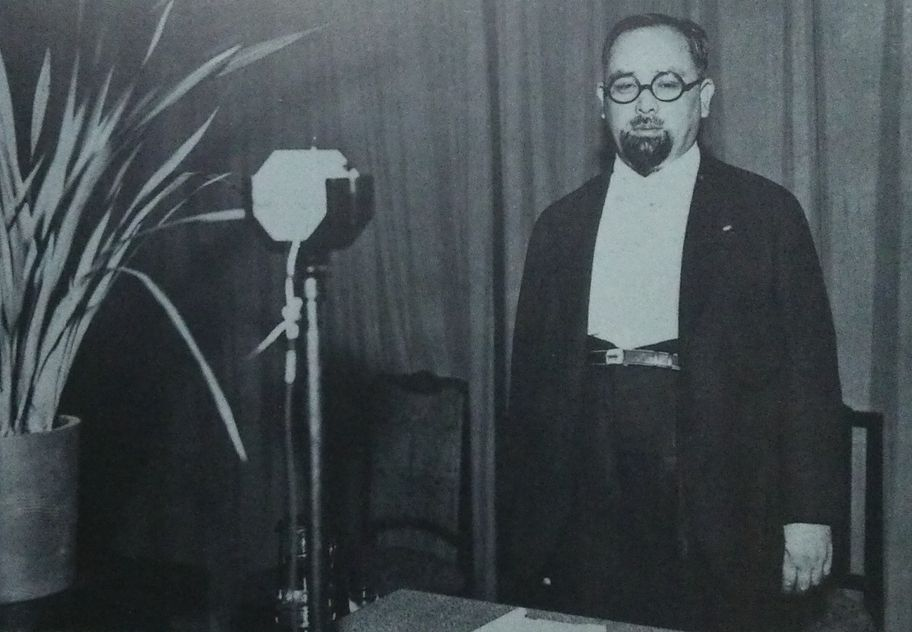
Matsumoto delivering a radio address, 1937

Matsumoto was released from prison on 26 December 1931. The political environment had become far more repressive, with the government cracking down on all leftist movements. The Suiheisha itself was in decline and divided, with some factions influenced by the Japanese Communist Party arguing for its dissolution so that its members could focus on the broader class struggle. Matsumoto immediately began to revive the organization, using his own funds to keep it afloat. In 1933, he led a major national campaign against the Takamatsu District Court, which had used discriminatory language in a verdict and upheld the idea that Burakumin had a legal obligation to reveal their "special status". The campaign revived the Suiheisha, and Matsumoto emerged as a national figure with a reputation as the "Father of Liberation" (kaihō no chichi).

In the general election of 20 February 1936, Matsumoto was elected to the House of Representatives for Fukuoka as an independent candidate, though with the support of the Socialist Masses Party (SMP). In the Diet, he consistently raised Buraku issues, demanding increased funding for improvement projects and calling for the abolition of the peerage system, which he argued was the root cause of discrimination. He also became a leading voice in the attempt to form an anti-fascist united front among the proletarian parties to resist the growing power of the military. In September 1936, he formally changed the kanji for his given name from 次一郎 to 治一郎. The new character 治 (ji) meant not only "govern" but also "reform" or "heal", signifying his commitment to reforming Japan from within the government.

=== Wartime activities ===
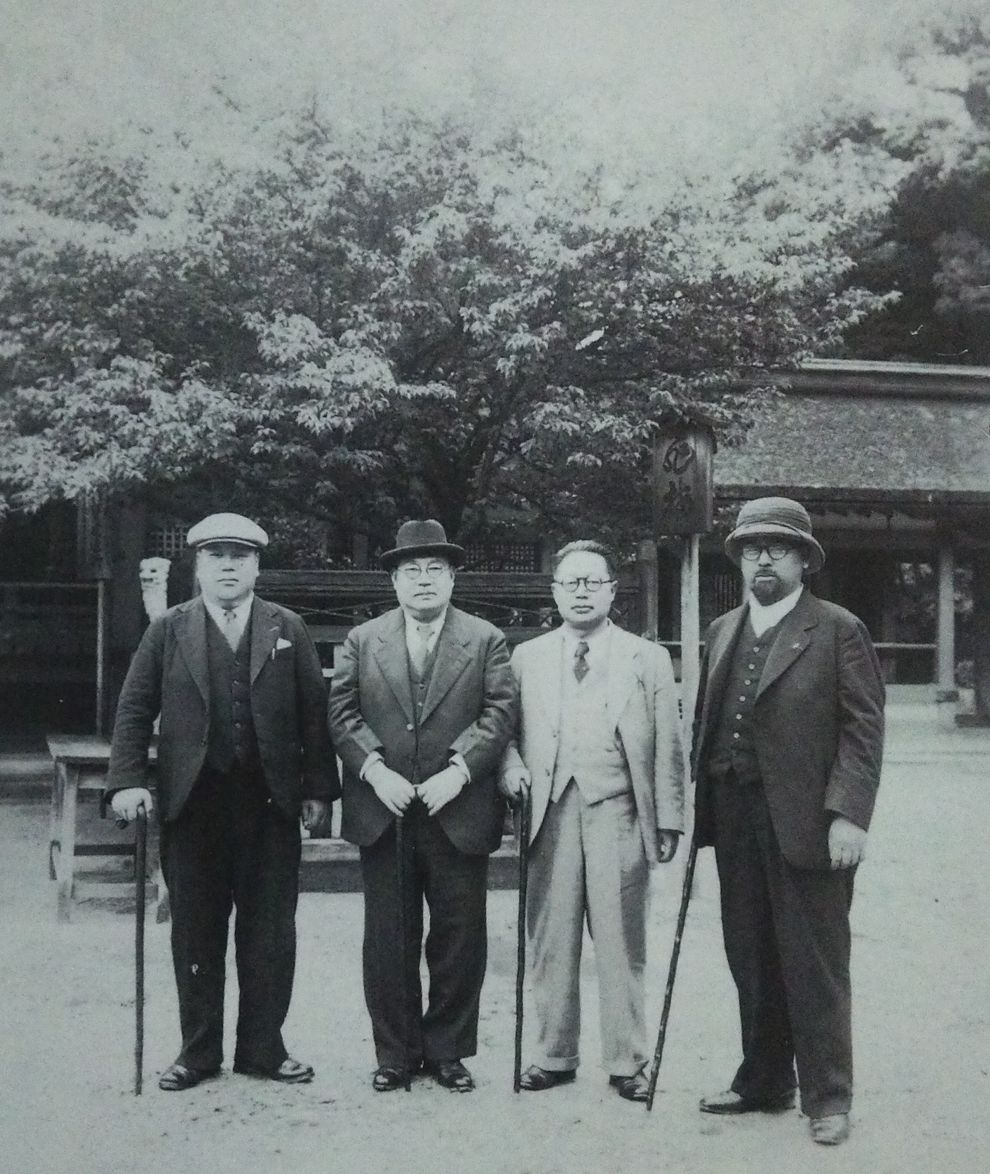
Matsuomo (far right) with Socialist Masses Party politicians, 1939

As Japan entered full-scale war with China in 1937, Matsumoto's position became increasingly difficult. While many on the left either fell silent or embraced nationalism, he continued to oppose the government. His stance was complex. In 1937, the Suiheisha leadership, including Matsumoto, issued a statement expressing support for "national unity" in the "emergency situation" but simultaneously insisted on continuing the fight against discrimination. In the Diet, he advocated for a "people's diplomacy" and criticized the government's aggressive foreign policy, employing the regime's own slogans about Asian co-prosperity to argue that true peace in Asia was impossible without eliminating discrimination at home.

His business, the Matsumoto-gumi, prospered with wartime contracts. In 1941, he helped establish the Japan New Leather Control Co. Ltd. (nicknamed the "Wanwan Kaisha" or "Bow-wow Company"), which produced leather goods from the pelts of dogs and canned their meat, a valuable commodity in wartime. In the 1942 "Tōjō election", he was an officially endorsed candidate of the Imperial Rule Assistance Association (IRAA), the state-sponsored national political organization. This has been a source of controversy, with some critics viewing it as evidence of collaboration. However, other non-conformist politicians like Nakano Seigō ran and won in the same district without endorsement, suggesting Matsumoto may have had a choice. Ian Neary suggests his decision was pragmatic, as he continued to engage in anti-establishment activities. He was, for example, a member of the Yōkakai (The Pearl Harbor Day Society), a group of dissident Diet members critical of Prime Minister Hideki Tojo's government. At the same time, he participated in a Diet committee that revised the law to introduce military conscription for Koreans, an action for which he was later criticized. Throughout the war, he managed to keep the Suiheisha organization alive, resisting government pressure to dissolve it and merge with the state-run dōwa (assimilation) movement.

== Post-war career ==
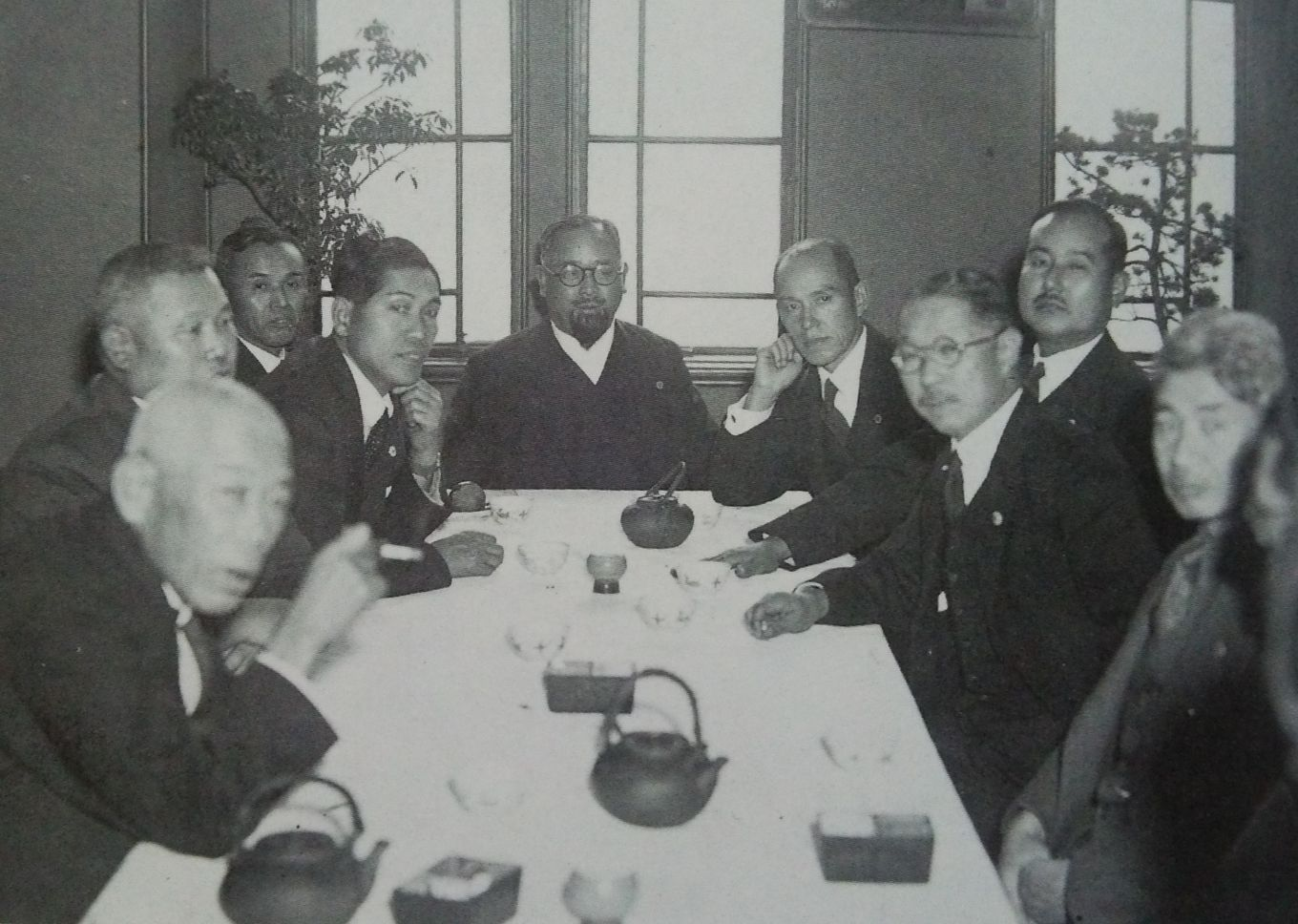
Matsumoto and other Diet members, 1940s

Immediately after Japan's surrender on 15 August 1945, Matsumoto ordered a large quantity of rice balls to be distributed to the homeless at Hakata Station. He was centrally involved in the founding of the Japan Socialist Party (JSP) in November 1945, and his home in Fukuoka became the base for both the new party and the revived Buraku liberation movement. He quickly re-established himself as a national figure, advocating for republicanism and proposing a "Japanese Union of Republics" to replace the emperor-centered state. In January 1946, he chaired the founding conference of the National Committee for Buraku Liberation (部落解放全国委員会, Buraku Kaihō Zenkoku Iinkai), the successor to the Suiheisha.

=== Purge and House of Councillors ===
Because of his endorsement by the IRAA in the 1942 election, Matsumoto was targeted by the post-war purge of wartime leaders and was initially barred from running in the first post-war election in April 1946. After extensive lobbying of the American authorities, during which he highlighted his pre-war anti-militarist record, the order was lifted, but too late for him to stand.

In the April 1947 elections, the first held under the new Constitution of Japan, Matsumoto was elected to the House of Councillors for the national constituency with 419,494 votes. He was elected as the first Vice-President of the House. In this role, he caused a national scandal in January 1948 at the opening ceremony of the Diet. It was customary for officials to walk backwards or sideways to avoid turning their back on the emperor. Matsumoto, as fourth in line to greet Emperor Hirohito, refused to perform this "crab walk" (ganimata), instead walking normally across the room. The incident was widely reported and celebrated by his supporters as a symbol of the new democratic era, though it outraged conservatives. His persistent and public criticism of the emperor system, whom he held responsible for the war, is believed to have been the primary reason he was officially purged from public office on 24 January 1949, by order of Prime Minister Shigeru Yoshida's government. A nationwide campaign for his reinstatement was launched by the Buraku liberation movement and other leftist groups, but he was not de-purged until August 1951.

=== International peace activism ===
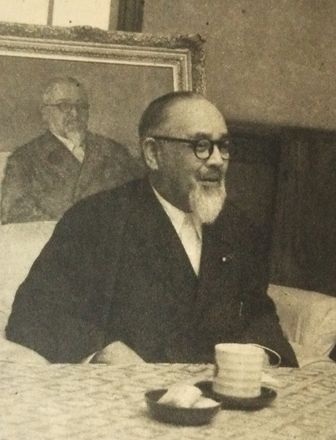
Matsumoto in 1954

Upon his return to politics, Matsumoto became a leading figure in the left wing of the JSP, which opposed the San Francisco Peace Treaty and the U.S.-Japan Security Treaty, arguing for Japanese neutrality and "positive neutrality". He became a prominent international peace activist and a leading advocate for the normalization of relations with the People's Republic of China. In 1952, he was invited to the Asia-Pacific Peace Conference in Beijing, but the Japanese government refused him a passport.

He finally traveled abroad in January 1953, attending the Asian Socialist Conference in Rangoon, Burma. From there, he traveled for three months through India, Pakistan, Europe, and finally China, meeting with leaders like Jawaharlal Nehru and Zhou Enlai and promoting his vision of Asian solidarity and world peace. In 1954, he hosted the American-French entertainer and anti-racism activist Josephine Baker on her visit to Japan. Baker, who was building a "rainbow tribe" of adopted children from different backgrounds, adopted two children from Japan during her tour, and Matsumoto became a friend and supporter.

Matsumoto continued his "people's diplomacy" throughout the 1950s, attending the Bandung Conference in 1955 as an observer and the World Assembly for Peace in Helsinki. These trips, financed by his business, established him as a key link between the Japanese left and international anti-imperialist and peace movements.

== Final years and legacy ==
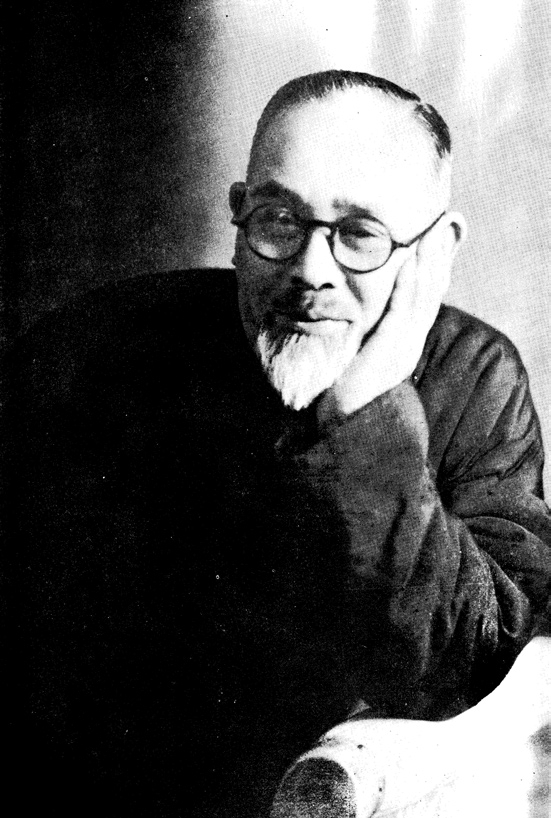
Matsumoto c. 1960s

By the late 1950s, Matsumoto's health was beginning to decline, but he remained politically active. He was a central figure in the Buraku Liberation League (the BKI's successor from 1955) and in the JSP's opposition to the 1960 revision of the US-Japan Security Treaty (the Anpo struggle). His primary focus, however, returned to domestic policy. He was instrumental in pressuring the government to address the "Buraku issue" as a matter of national responsibility. His efforts, along with those of JSP Dietman Kazuo Yagi, contributed to the establishment of a government commission which, in August 1965, produced the Dōwa Taisaku Shingikai Tōshin (Report of the Deliberation Council on Integration Policy). This landmark report acknowledged that the state had a duty to resolve Buraku poverty and discrimination and led to the passage of the Special Measures Law for Dōwa Projects in 1969, which funneled trillions of yen into Buraku communities over the next three decades. Matsumoto had private reservations about the plan, fearing it would create dependency and corruption, but publicly supported it as a necessary step.

In March 1966, suffering from arteriosclerosis, Matsumoto gave his final speech at the 21st conference of the Buraku Liberation League. He died at home in Fukuoka on 22 November 1966, at the age of 79. Over 10,000 people attended his memorial service in Fukuoka.

Matsumoto remains an iconic figure in the Buraku liberation movement. His political legacy was continued by his adopted son, Matsumoto Eichi (1921–1995), who took over his seat in the House of Councillors, and his grandson, Ryu Matsumoto (1951–2018), who served in the House of Representatives from 1990 to 2012 and was a minister in the Democratic Party of Japan government.
