= Burakumin =

Marginalized social group in Japan

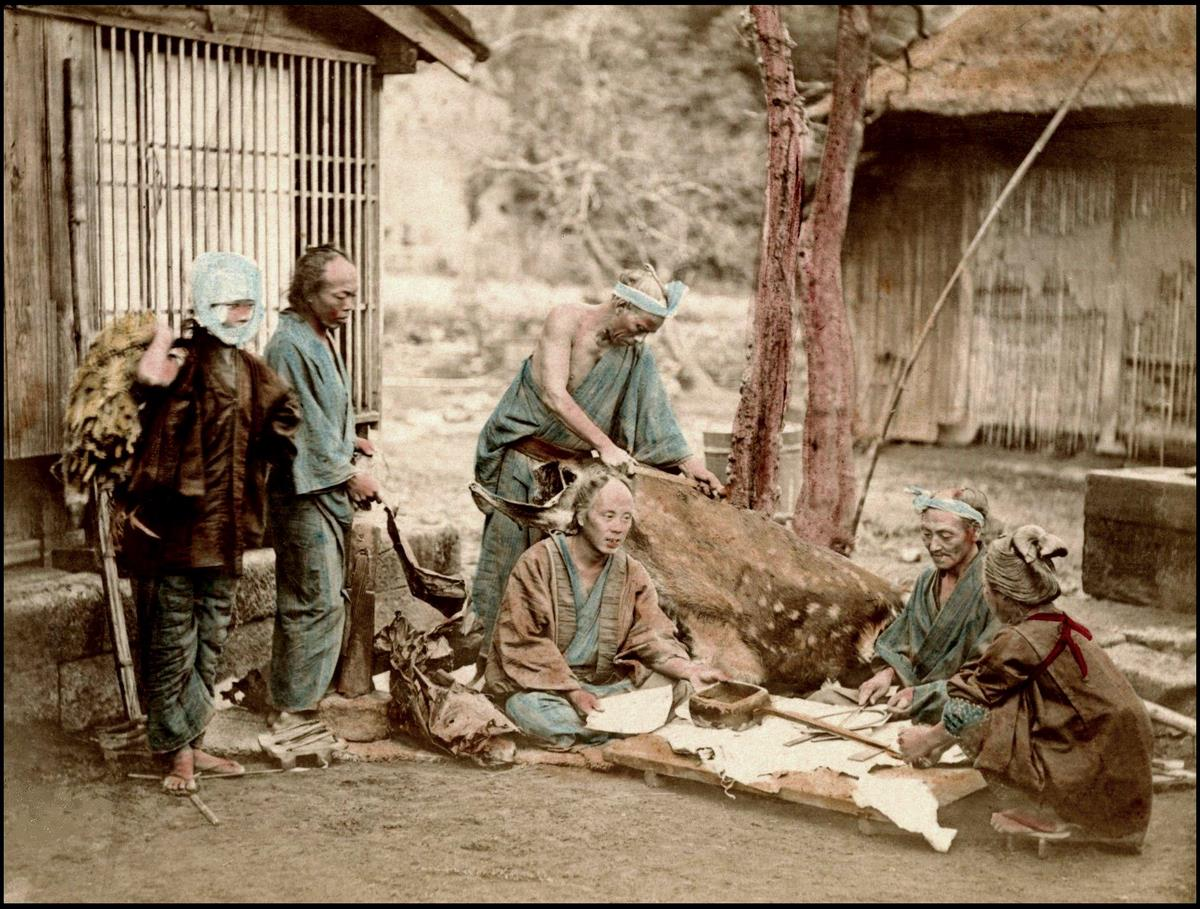
Staged photo by Suzuki Shin'ichi I depicting burakumin leather workers, 1873

Burakumin (Japanese: 部落民, lit. "hamlet people") are a historically marginalized social group in Japan. Their ancestors were outcastes of the pre-modern era who were associated with occupations considered impure or tainted by death, such as executioners, undertakers, slaughterhouse workers, butchers, and tanners. This group resided at the bottom of the traditional social hierarchy, and were segregated into their own hamlets and neighborhoods. Although legally liberated in 1871 with the abolition of the feudal caste system, burakumin have since faced persistent discrimination and prejudice. Their total modern population is estimated to be between 1.5 and 3 million.

The history of the burakumin is often presented as a "master narrative" that assumes a direct, continuous line from pre-modern outcastes to the modern-day community. However, scholars such as Timothy D. Amos have challenged this view, arguing that the modern burakumin identity is a more recent, discursively constructed category that homogenizes diverse groups with unique and often fluid histories. As they are physically and ethnically indistinguishable from other Japanese people, the discrimination they face is often rooted in their ancestry, place of residence, or other indirect markers. This "invisibility" has led to a social environment where buraku issues are often shrouded in silence, creating a paradox where individuals may be of burakumin descent without being aware of it.

The social stigma attached to the group led to the buraku mondai (部落問題, "buraku problem") in modern Japan. Various social and political movements have emerged since the late 19th century to combat this discrimination, most notably the National Levellers Association (Suiheisha) in the 1920s and the post-war Buraku Liberation League (BLL). These movements have adopted different strategies, from vocal confrontation to strategic silence, to challenge prejudice and advocate for human rights. While living conditions in buraku communities have improved, particularly as a result of government projects in the late 20th century, burakumin may still face social ostracism, especially in marriage and employment.

== Etymology and terminology ==
The term burakumin is derived from buraku (部落), which originally meant "hamlet" or "village", and retains that sense in areas where the burakumin issue is much less publicly prominent, such as Hokkaido and Okinawa. The term became associated with the former outcaste communities because of the way they were administratively separated and officially labelled during the Meiji era. After the 1871 Liberation Edict abolished the old status names of eta (穢多, "abundance of filth") and hinin (非人, "non-human"), new terms were devised by those who sought to maintain discrimination, such as "former eta" or shin-heimin (新平民, "new commoners"). Around the time of the Russo-Japanese War (1904–1905), these communities were "discovered" as a social problem and labelled tokushū buraku (特殊部落, "special buraku") to distinguish them from regular hamlets; by 1908, this term and the related tokushumin had replaced shin-heimin in popular press coverage of the minority.

The term burakumin, which carried strong discriminatory connotations, became a "discourse of difference" that categorized diverse populations into a single common group. The term eta in the early modern period was primarily a temporal signifier, referring to the state or condition of an individual's humanity for the duration of their life. In contrast, the modern term burakumin is a spatial signifier, used to signify the abnormality of a particular place that needs to be marked off by a "sanitary cordon" (cordon sanitaire). In time, liberation movements came to prefer terms like hisabetsu buraku (被差別部落, discriminated buraku), hiappaku buraku (被圧迫部落, oppressed buraku), or mikaihō buraku (未解放部落, unliberated buraku).

In the post-war period, the term dōwa (同和, "assimilation") was used by the government, particularly in the context of projects aimed at resolving discrimination, while liberation groups continued to use hisabetsu buraku. The term dōwa was intended as a neutral euphemism, but as it became synonymous with buraku, it too acquired a stigma and was eventually removed from the official names of government laws and policies. Today, within liberation movements and scholarly work, the terms hisabetsu buraku and simply buraku (as an abbreviation) are widely used without inherent discriminatory connotations.

== History ==
=== Origins (pre-modern period) ===
The origins of buraku discrimination are connected to status distinctions that existed in Japan from the pre-modern era. During the Yamatai state (c. 1st–3rd century CE), a class structure composed of royalty, nobles, commoners, and slaves existed, with clear status distinctions. However, the direct institutional precursor to the buraku outcaste system was established under the Ritsuryō legal codes in the late 7th and early 8th centuries. Influenced by Chinese legal structures, the Ritsuryō system divided the population into ryōmin (良民, "good people") and senmin (賤民, "base/lowly people"). The senmin class included various groups, such as imperial tomb guards (kanko) and government- or privately-owned slaves (nuhi). This system made slavery hereditary, forbade intermarriage with ryōmin, and connected the notion of "baseness" with the polluting nature of death, as tomb guards were re-assigned to senmin status.

During the Heian period (794–1185), discrimination based on ideas of ritual pollution (kegare), derived from both Shinto and Buddhist beliefs, became more pronounced. The Engishiki code (927) stipulated periods of impurity following contact with death (human or animal), birth, and blood, which strengthened occupational discrimination against those who handled such things. Buddhist texts introduced the concept of sendara (a transliteration of the Sanskrit caṇḍāla, referring to the lowest castes in India) to describe those with "bad integrity," such as butchers, hunters, and fishermen. These religious and legal ideas gradually spread, leading to increased prejudice against butchers and leather workers, who were often excluded from mainstream society, particularly in and around the capital, Kyoto. Popular theories about the origins of the outcastes often suggest a foreign ancestry, including Korean, but these are generally after-the-fact rationalizations; as a whole, the outcastes are not descendants of Koreans, but are ethnically Japanese. For instance, some Kokugaku scholars in the late Tokugawa period proposed that eta were descendants of Korean prisoners of war, a theory intended to either assert Japanese supremacy or as a veiled attack on Confucianism, which they associated with Korea.

=== Middle Ages and early modern period ===
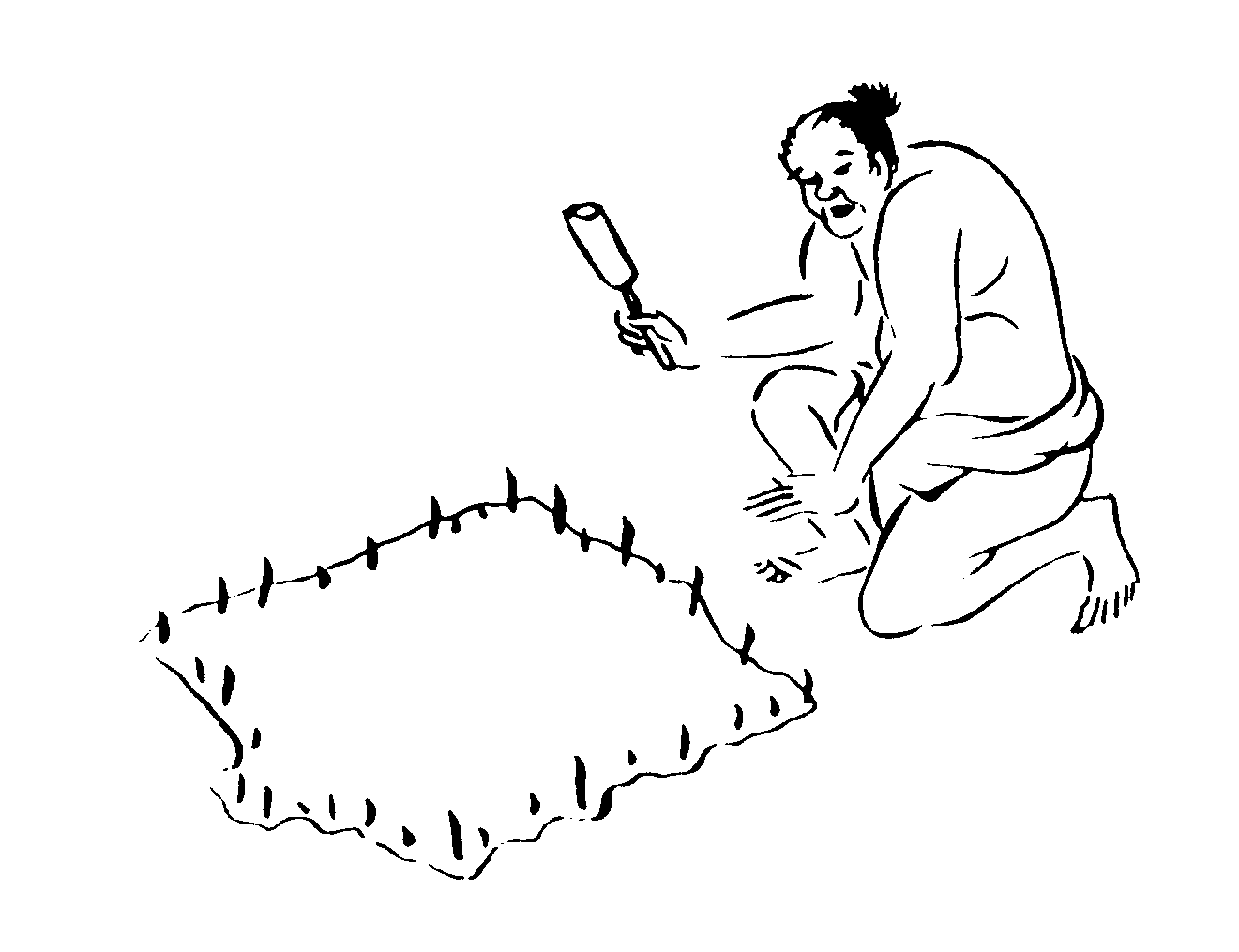
Depiction of an eta man stretching a leather hide from the Shichiju ichiban shokunin utaawase, c. 1500

During the Middle Ages (c. 12th–16th centuries), which some historians characterize as a "loose caste society", the status system became more fluid and less legally defined than under the Ritsuryō codes. In some historical scholarship, medieval marginalized groups are referred to as "outcasts", a term that reflects their potential social mobility, in contrast to the more rigid status of "outcastes" in the early modern period. Discriminated groups could be broadly classified into three types: eta, hinin, and sanjo.

- Eta (also known as kiyome, saiku, or kawaramono) were primarily associated with occupations involving butchery and leatherwork. The term eta is thought to derive from etori ("feeder" of hawks and animals). They lived in specific locations, often on riverbanks (hence kawaramono, "river-side people"), which were necessary for the tanning process. Besides leatherwork, they also worked as landscape gardeners, well-diggers, and were tasked with carrying out punishments and handling the dead.
- Hinin ("non-humans") were a more narrowly defined group, consisting mainly of beggars, the sick (particularly those with leprosy), orphans, and the destitute. Unlike the eta, whose status was permanent, the hinin status was not always hereditary, and individuals could sometimes move back into the commoner class. They formed communities (shuku) often near temples or graveyards, such as at Kiyomizu temple in Kyoto and in Nara. Their leaders were known as chōri. They lived by begging and also performed duties such as guarding, cleaning for temples, and arresting criminals.
- Sanjo ("scattered people") were groups such as garden sweepers and performers who were often attached to government agencies or temples and led a discriminated existence.

During the Sengoku period (1467–1603), regional warlords (daimyō) began to organize leather workers, then called kawata, to ensure a stable supply of leather for military goods like armor. These artisans were controlled through their group leaders and granted a monopoly over their craft in exchange for taxes and services. In areas like northern Kyushu, outcaste communities existed from at least the 16th century, primarily engaged in leatherwork but also farming and producing craft goods such as drums.

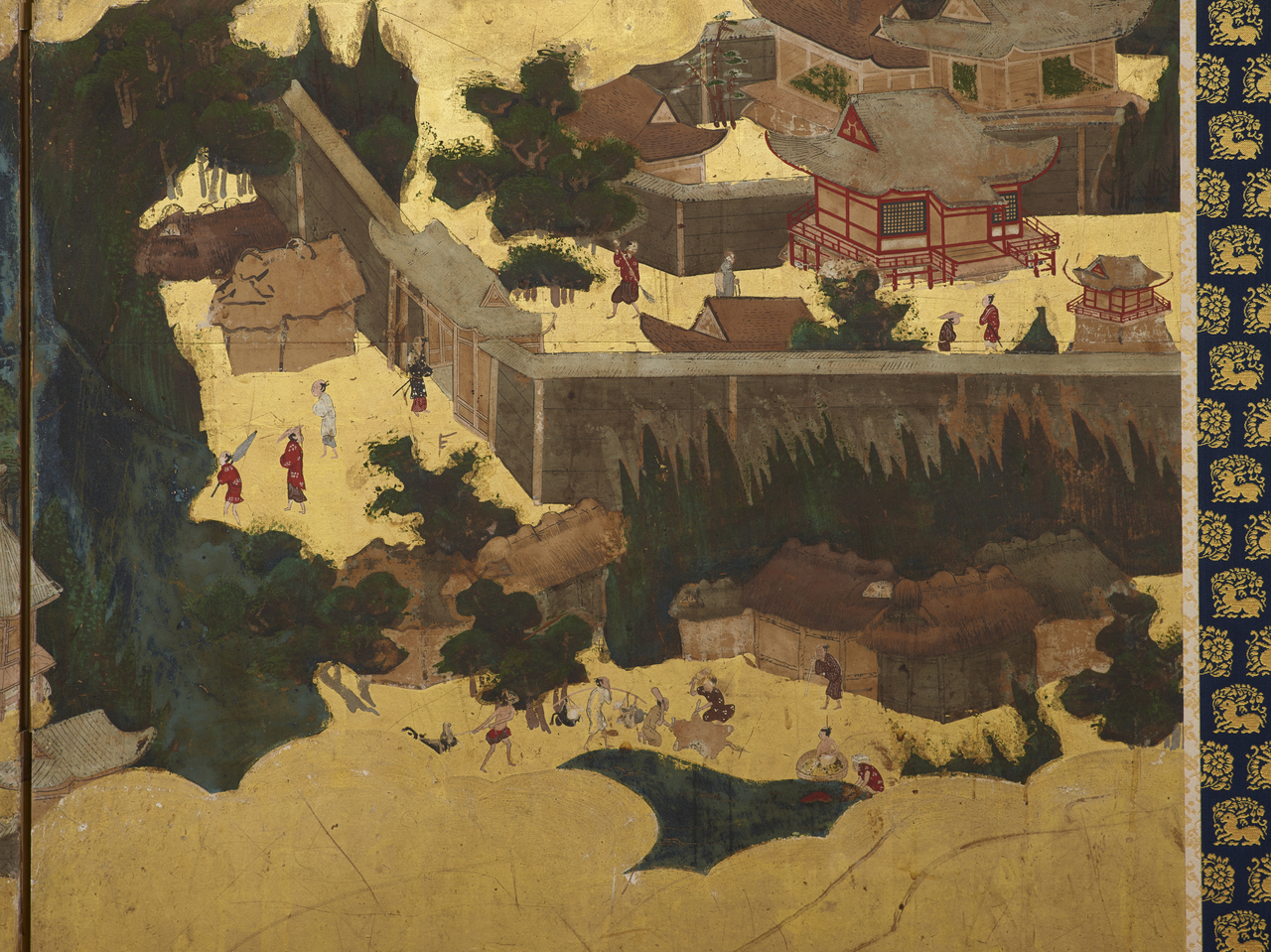
17th-century painting depicting a buraku outside the walls of Kyoto

The establishment of the Tokugawa shogunate (1603–1868) solidified a national status system. The population was broadly divided into samurai, farmers, artisans, and merchants, with the discriminated groups placed at the very bottom, in part as a political tool to maintain social control and discourage peasant uprisings. The kawata (or chōri in eastern Japan) and hinin statuses were formalized and made hereditary. People with these statuses were registered separately in religious census records and lived in segregated villages or parts of towns. Their duties included leatherwork, drum making, acting as jailers and executioners, and policing functions. While their status was seen as polluting, many outcastes supported themselves through the same means as commoners, not only their mandated jobs. In a series of edicts between 1715 and 1730 known as the Kyōhō Reforms, the government strengthened the status system by codifying discriminatory regulations regarding clothing, hairstyle, and movement, making it virtually impossible for even non-hereditary hinin to be absorbed into the mainstream.

These regulations resulted in outcaste communities becoming larger and more isolated. While small and scattered in the 17th century, by the mid-19th century they were large, visible communities regarded with contempt and fear. The kawata population, in particular, may have increased by as much as 300 percent between 1720 and 1850, partly as a result of members of the mainstream population falling into outcaste areas, and partly because outcastes were more resilient to famine due to their access to meat. The Bakufu and various domains enacted increasingly detailed discriminatory policies, such as prescribing their clothing, forbidding them from entering towns at night, and restricting their interaction with commoners, further amplifying social prejudice. However, the status of these groups was ambivalent; many leaders within outcaste communities, such as Danzaemon in Edo, had considerable wealth and social standing. Moreover, membership of eta and hinin groups was not always stable or straightforward, with evidence of movement and absconding from these communities.

=== Modern Japan (Meiji period to WWII) ===
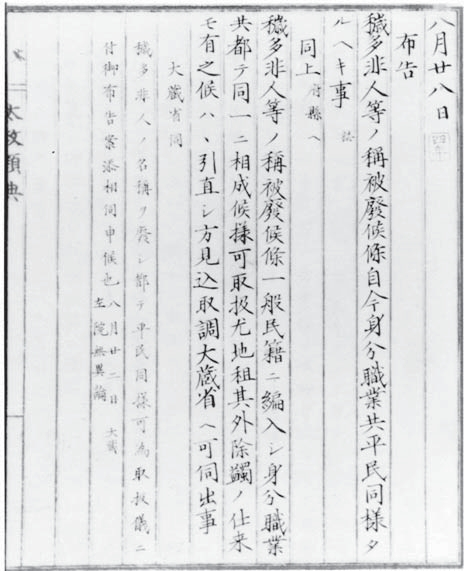
Text of the 1871 Liberation Declaration (Kaihōrei)

On 28 August 1871, the new Meiji government issued the Senmin Abolition Edict (賤民廃止令, Senmin Haishirei), commonly known as the Liberation Edict (解放令, Kaihōrei). The edict abolished the titles of eta, hinin, and others, declaring that these people were to be treated as commoners (heimin) in status and occupation. The reform was motivated partly by the need to create a unified tax system and an efficient national space, and partly by the influence of modern Western concepts of equality and human rights.

However, the edict did not end social discrimination. While the former outcastes largely responded with elation, demanding equal rights and in some cases engaging in self-policing to become more acceptable to the majority, many commoners reacted with hostility, seeing the reform not as an elevation of the burakumin but as a demotion for themselves that violated the traditional "moral economy". Violent riots occurred in opposition to the edict, often linked to broader discontent with Meiji modernization policies like conscription and land tax reform. These included "eta hunts" (eta-gari) and the destruction of buraku homes and property. In June 1873, a major rebellion in Fukuoka Prefecture known as the Takeyari Ikki involved up to 300,000 people and resulted in the destruction of over 2,000 houses belonging to burakumin, including the near-total destruction of the Horiguchi community in Hakata. The abolition of their traditional occupations, which had been guaranteed monopolies, was a double-edged sword: while it removed hereditary bonds to certain jobs, it also thrust many into economic difficulty as they were forced to compete with other entrepreneurs without state support. Discrimination was enabled through the koseki (family registry) system, which marked former outcastes as "new commoners", allowing their ancestry to be easily traced and perpetuating barriers to social integration.

The intellectual climate of the late 19th century exacerbated this social prejudice. The universalist ideals of the "civilization and enlightenment" period of the 1870s gave way in the 1880s to a new discourse shaped by Social Darwinism, eugenics, and concerns about public hygiene. In 1884, for example, the influential educator Takahashi Yoshio warned against intermarriage with burakumin to prevent the "pollution" of the Japanese gene pool with hereditary diseases like leprosy. The popular press, especially during cholera outbreaks, began to portray buraku communities as unsanitary ghettos and their residents as inherently diseased, immoral, and deviant. Journalist Yokoyama Gennosuke's 1899 report on a Tokyo buraku characterized residents as having an "indescribable stench" and being prone to a debauched and criminal lifestyle, framing these traits as endemic to the people themselves. The most enduring new boundary was a quasi-racial one: the idea that burakumin were of a "different race or ethnic group" from mainstream Japanese, a concept that became a powerful barrier to intermarriage. This theory was taken up by early anthropologists, who posited Korean or other "foreign" origins for the burakumin. Though later "scientific" studies by figures like Torii Ryūzō sought to prove they were "normal Japanese," the popular press often twisted these findings to reinforce the idea of racial difference. This notion of a different "lineage" or "impure bloodline" became central to modern buraku discrimination.

The government's municipal amalgamation program of 1888–1889 systematically excluded buraku communities from newly formed villages and towns, forcing them to remain as isolated administrative units, which further entrenched their segregation and poverty. It was only after the Russo-Japanese War that the government, concerned about national unity and social stability, began to address the buraku issue through kaizen jigyō (改善事業, "improvement policies"). Starting in Mie Prefecture in 1905, these policies were primarily "moral" movements aimed at reforming the customs and habits of the burakumin, with little budget or attention to economic problems. In response, affluent burakumin began to organize their own movements. The Dai Nippon Dōhō Yūwa Kai (Greater Japan Fraternal Conciliation Society), formed in 1903, and its successor the Yamato Dōshikai, advocated for "conciliation" (yūwa). This approach, often called the Yūwa Undō (Harmony Movement), was assimilationist, encouraging burakumin to prove their worth to mainstream society through hard work and patriotism. The government feared a link between buraku communities and the socialist movement, which spurred the state to develop a national Yūwa policy.

Flag of the Suiheisha, depicting a crown of thorns

The 1918 Rice Riots were a major turning point. Burakumin participated heavily in the nationwide protests and were disproportionately targeted for arrest and punishment by the authorities, making up 10.8% of those prosecuted while being less than 2% of the population. This repression fueled a desire for a self-directed liberation movement. On 3 March 1922, the Zenkoku Suiheisha (全国水平社, National Levellers Association) was founded in Kyoto. Its declaration famously proclaimed: "The time has come when we can be proud of being eta." The Suiheisha became the first nationwide, self-directed buraku liberation movement, championing pride, self-respect, and a strategy of tetteiteki kyūdan (徹底的糾弾, "thorough denunciation") of discrimination wherever it occurred.

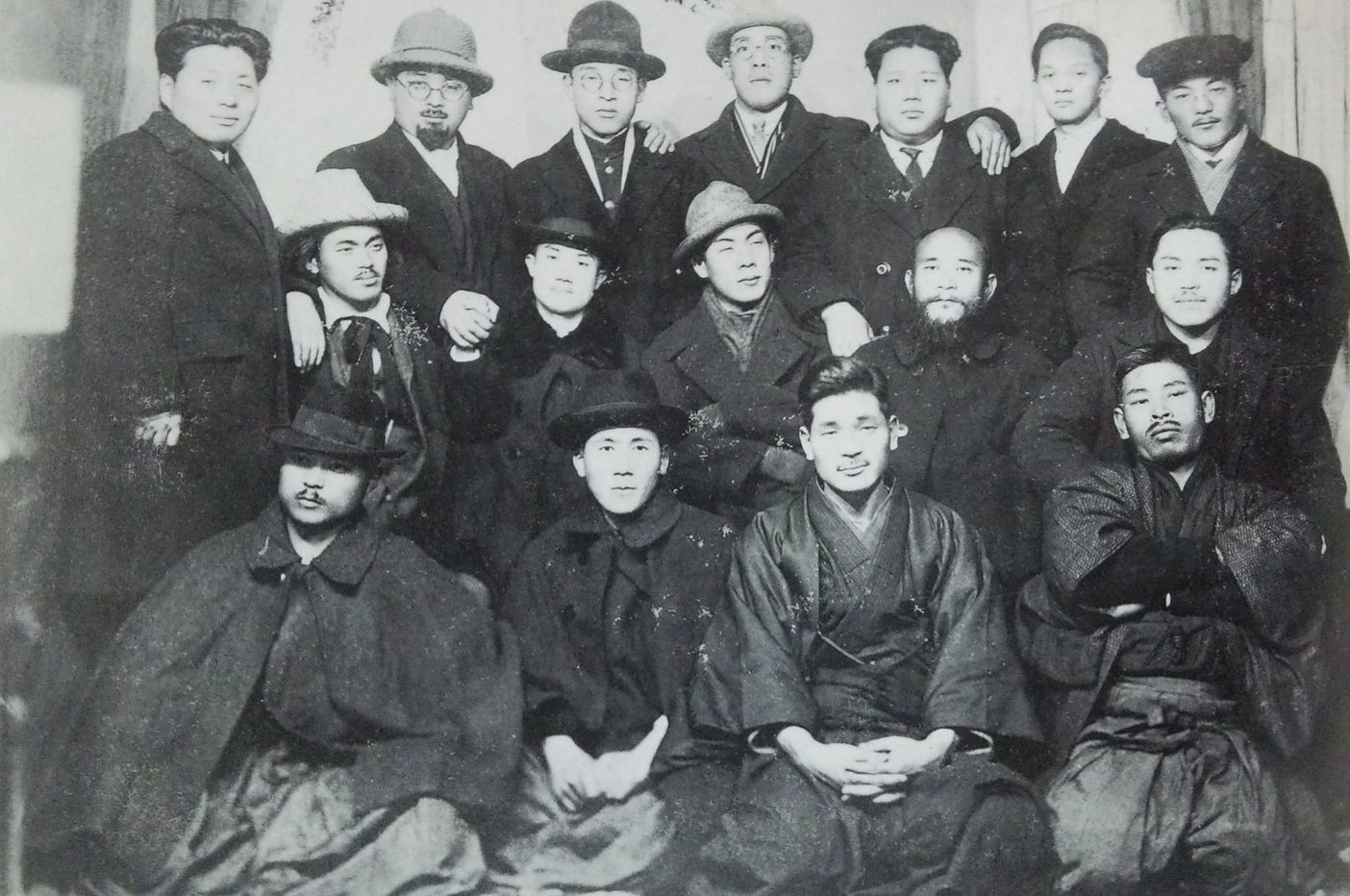
Suiheisha members in 1924

In its early years, the movement combined an ideology of ethnic nationalism with fervent patriotism, criticizing the majority's prejudice as a betrayal of the emperor's will. In the mid-1920s, the movement was heavily influenced by socialism and communism, leading to a major ideological shift and internal conflict between those advocating for class struggle and those focusing on buraku-specific issues. The movement was re-energized by the 1933 Takamatsu Trial Incident, a court case involving blatant discrimination, which led to a new platform that defined burakumin as an "oppressed" group (hiappaku buraku). As Japan moved towards militarism in the 1930s, the Suiheisha was co-opted into supporting the war effort, adopting state rhetoric like "national conciliation" (kokumin yūwa). In June 1941, the wider Yūwa movement was restructured by the state to create the Dōwa Hōkōkai, a "powerful reconciliation movement of state officials and people" in which discrimination was defined as "unpatriotic activity". The Suiheisha was ultimately forced to dissolve by the government in 1942 as part of the consolidation of civil society organizations under the Imperial Rule Assistance Association.

=== Post–World War II ===
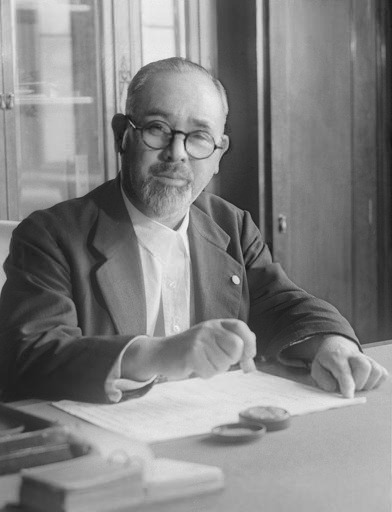
Jiichirō Matsumoto, known as the "father of buraku liberation"

Immediately after Japan's surrender in 1945, the buraku liberation movement was revived. In February 1946, former Suiheisha members and pre-war Yūwa activists came together to form the Buraku Liberation National Committee (部落解放全国委員会 Buraku Kaihō Zenkoku Iinkai, or BNLC). The new Constitution of Japan, promulgated in 1946, explicitly guaranteed equality under the law in Article 14, stating there shall be no discrimination based on "race, creed, sex, social status or family origin." Activists like Jiichirō Matsumoto were involved in the drafting process and successfully lobbied for protections related to marriage and family, such as Article 24, which states that marriage shall be based only on mutual consent.

Despite these legal changes, the living conditions in buraku communities remained dire. They were largely left behind by post-war land reforms and economic recovery, suffering from high unemployment, poor housing, and inadequate sanitation. Although the central government and the Occupation authorities were largely indifferent, some local governments, particularly in the Kansai region, revived Dōwa projects on a small scale from 1946 onwards. In 1951, the "All Romance Incident," involving a discriminatory story published in a pulp fiction magazine set in a Kyoto buraku, galvanized the BNLC to shift its focus. The campaign linked the discrimination in the story to the poor living conditions of the community and demanded that the government take administrative action to resolve the buraku issue. This marked the beginning of a new strategy focused on gyōsei tōsō (administration struggles). The movement's new militancy was demonstrated in incidents like the 1952 Nishikawa Affair, where a prefectural assemblyman in Wakayama was forced to resign after making discriminatory remarks.

Flag of the Buraku Liberation League (BLL)

In 1955, the BNLC changed its name to the Buraku Liberation League (部落解放同盟, Buraku Kaihō Dōmei, or BLL). Growing pressure from the BLL and its political allies in the Japan Socialist Party, including a "Grand March of Liberation" to Tokyo in 1961, led the government to establish the Dōwa Policy Advisory Council (Dōwa Taisaku Shingikai). The government's concession was partly motivated by a desire to weaken the BLL's commitment to the widespread anti–US-Japan Security Treaty protest movement of the time. In 1965, the council submitted a landmark report (known as the Dōtaishin Tōshin) that acknowledged for the first time that the resolution of the buraku problem was a "responsibility of the state." The report defined buraku discrimination as an infringement of civil rights, rejected theories of racial difference or feudal remnants, and focused on improving the poor living environments of buraku communities as the key to solving the problem.

This led to the enactment of the Special Measures Law for Dōwa Projects in 1969. Over the next thirty-three years, this law and its successors funnelled significant government funds—a total of around ¥15 trillion—into "Dōwa projects" aimed at improving housing, infrastructure, and living standards in designated buraku districts. The projects dramatically transformed the physical environment of many communities and significantly improved educational outcomes, with high school matriculation rates for buraku youth rising by nearly 35 percent in some prefectures between 1969 and 2002. However, the law was a time-limited measure, not the permanent Human Rights Basic Law that the BLL had campaigned for. The projects also created a new "official boundary" by formally designating areas as dōwa chiku (同和地区, 'assimilation districts'), which some argued reinforced stigma. It is estimated that around 1,000 buraku communities chose not to register as dōwa chiku, wanting to avoid the negative attention that could come from explicitly declaring themselves burakumin.

During this period, the BLL grew into a powerful national movement. The Sayama Incident, a murder case from 1963 in which a buraku man, Kazuo Ishikawa, was convicted, became a major focus of the BLL's activism from the late 1960s, with the league arguing it was a miscarriage of justice. In 1975, the discovery of the Buraku Chimei Sōkan, illegally compiled address lists of buraku communities being sold to companies for use in discriminatory hiring practices, brought the issue of employment discrimination to national attention. However, the period was also marked by internal conflict, particularly with the Japan Communist Party (JCP) over ideology and tactics. The JCP criticized the Dōwa projects for separating burakumin from the wider working-class movement, and alleged that the BLL's control over the allocation of Dōwa funds (the Madoguchi Ippon or "single window" strategy) was exclusionary and undemocratic. This conflict culminated in violent denunciation struggles, such as the Yata incident in 1969 and the Yoka High School incident in 1974, where BLL members physically assaulted teachers affiliated with the JCP. In 1976, the JCP-aligned faction of the movement formed a separate organization, the Zenkoku Buraku Kaiho Undo Rengokai (National Buraku Liberation Movement Alliance, or Zenkairen).

The implementation of the Dōwa projects was accompanied by persistent accusations of corruption and misuse of funds. Critics alleged that the BLL used its influence over local governments to secure kickbacks from construction contracts and channel funds to its members and affiliated businesses. In the late 1970s and early 1980s, scandals in Kitakyushu and Kyoto led to investigations into the misuse of funds by local leaders of both the BLL and the conservative Zen Nihon Dōwakai. The most significant case was the Asuka-kai incident in Osaka, which came to light in 2006. The head of a BLL branch and a non-profit organization, Nobuhiko Konishi, was arrested for embezzling vast sums from public funds meant for Dōwa construction projects. The scandal also involved a major bank (the future Bank of Tokyo Mitsubishi UFJ) that had provided unsecured loans to Konishi's organization under pressure, and had links to yakuza figures. A parallel issue was the rise of fraudulent ese-Dōwa ("fake Dōwa") groups, which were often fronts for organized crime. These groups would extort money from companies by threatening to publicly denounce them for alleged acts of discrimination, capitalizing on the mainstream population's fear of being associated with the buraku issue.

== Contemporary situation ==
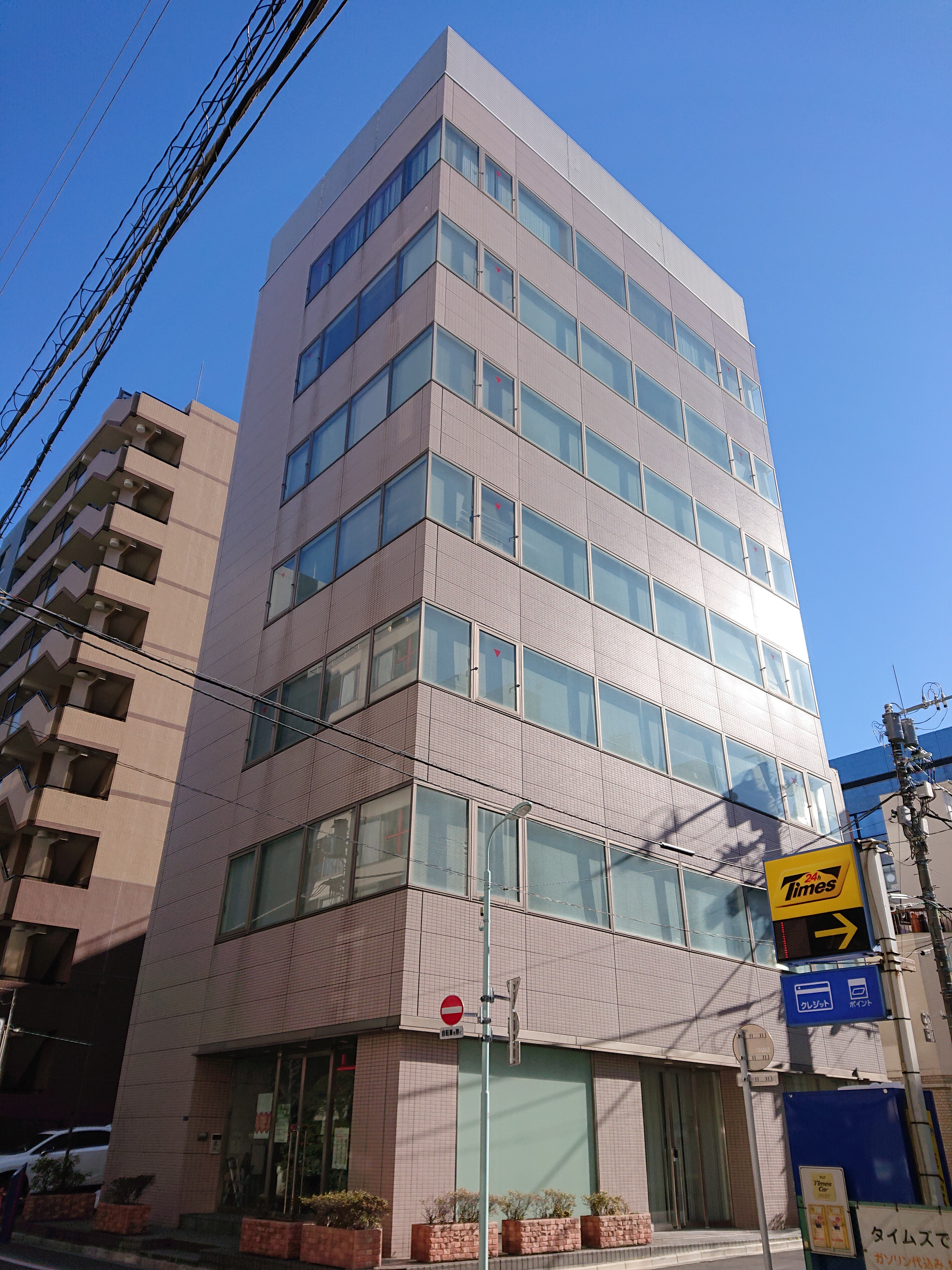
Headquarters of the BLL in Tokyo, 2019

The Special Measures Law expired in March 2002, officially ending the era of government-led Dōwa projects. The government's final statement concluded that the projects had substantially improved the material environment, breaking the cycle of poverty and discrimination, and that the focus should now shift to promoting human rights education. While the living conditions in many buraku communities have improved significantly, discrimination persists, particularly in marriage and employment. The focus of the problem has shifted from overt poverty and poor sanitation to more subtle forms of social exclusion and prejudice.

A 1993 government survey provided a detailed snapshot of the situation. It found a "Dōwa-related population" of 892,751 people living in 4,442 designated communities. Most were located in western Japan, while none were located in Hokkaido and Tōhoku. About three quarters of the districts were in rural areas. The size of each community ranged from less than five households to more than 1,000 households. While the proportion of burakumin in these districts had decreased, indicating outward migration, significant disparities remained. Economically, 52 percent of buraku households received livelihood support, nearly double the rate for non-buraku households in the same areas. Educational attainment had improved, with high school entrance rates nearing the national average, but rates of long-term absenteeism were double the average, and university progression (around 20 percent) still lagged significantly behind the mainstream figure of nearly 40 percent.

Estimating the precise number of burakumin is difficult due to the social sensitivity of the issue and the self-identification of individuals. Because burakumin parents sometimes do not tell their children about their ancestry in hopes of avoiding discrimination, there is an increasingly large population that has no idea that others would consider them burakumin. Discrimination is primarily based on ancestry and location; someone with no burakumin ancestry may be viewed as one and discriminated against if they move to a former dōwa chiku. Broader estimates of the total population range from 1.5 to 3 million people.

=== Social discrimination ===
In the 1993 survey, one-third of burakumin surveyed reported experiencing discrimination, most often related to marriage or employment. Cases of continuing social discrimination are known to occur mainly in western Japan, particularly in the Osaka, Kyoto, Hyogo, and Hiroshima regions, where many people, especially the older generation, stereotype buraku residents (whatever their ancestry) and associate them with squalor, unemployment and criminality. Outside of the Kansai region, the general population is often not aware of the issues experienced by those of buraku ancestry, and if they are, this awareness may only be awareness of the history of feudal Japan.

Traditionalist families have been known to check on the backgrounds of potential in-laws to identify people of buraku ancestry, a practice which has been progressively banned through court rulings and local ordinances. The 1993 survey showed that 5 percent of mainstream respondents said they would "completely oppose" a marriage to a burakumin. A 2013 survey by the Tokyo Metropolitan Government also highlighted the persistence of discriminatory attitudes regarding marriage. When asked what they would do if their child intended to marry someone from a Dōwa community, only 46.5% of respondents said they would respect their child's wishes without reservation, while 27% said they "don't know," and the remainder expressed reluctance; 56.5% of young people said they would go through with such a marriage if their parents strongly objected. Nadamoto Masahisa of the Buraku History Institute estimates that between 60 and 80% of burakumin marry a non-burakumin, whereas for people born during the late 1930s and early 1940s, the rate was 10%.

=== Social movements and approaches ===
Contemporary approaches to the buraku issue are shaped by the differing philosophies of the main liberation movements. The BLL continues to advocate for a "voice" strategy, openly challenging discrimination and promoting buraku pride and history. In contrast, the Jiyū Dōwa Kai (Liberal Assimilation Association, or JDK), a conservative organization formed in 1986 with ties to the Liberal Democratic Party, advocates a "silence" approach. The JDK argues that continually raising the buraku issue perpetuates stigma and that discrimination should be addressed as part of a broader struggle for human rights without singling out any specific group. These contrasting approaches influence how the issue is handled at the community level, from school curricula to local festivals.

Since the 1980s, the BLL has broadened its focus to build solidarity with other minority groups, both within Japan (such as Ainu, resident Koreans, and Okinawans) and internationally, framing the buraku issue within a universal human rights context. In 1988, it was instrumental in founding the International Movement Against Discrimination and Racism (IMADR), which gained consultative status at the United Nations in 1993. This shift has been described as the development of a "human rights culture" (jinken bunka), exemplified by institutions like the Liberty Osaka human rights museum, which was established by the BLL in 1985. This activism is a joint activity, also involving national and local governments which participate in "human rights enlightenment activities."

In recent years, the buraku problem has become less visible in public discourse. This is partly due to the transition in administrative focus from specific "Dōwa policy" to general "human rights policy," as well as other factors such as municipal consolidations and an aging population, which have diluted attention on the specific issue of buraku discrimination. There is a "virtual taboo" in the Japanese media against discussing the topic, leading to widespread public ignorance. This institutional silence compels many burakumin to manage their identity through a process of "bracketing"—selectively concealing or revealing their background depending on the social context. This strategy is not necessarily a passive acceptance of stigma but an active, pragmatic decision to avoid potential discrimination.

The rise of the internet has also created new challenges, with a large amount of discriminatory graffiti and hate speech appearing online. Because Buraku discrimination is based on location, the use of maps has contributed to the ongoing discrimination. In 2009, Google faced controversy after digitized Tokugawa-era maps were published on Google Earth, which could be used to identify historical outcaste areas.

== Notable burakumin ==
- Tadashi Yanai, founder and president of Uniqlo
- Tōru Hashimoto, politician of the Nippon Ishin no Kai, lawyer, the 52nd governor of Osaka Prefecture, and former Mayor of Osaka city
- Jiichirō Matsumoto, politician and businessman known as the "father of buraku liberation"
- Ryu Matsumoto, politician of the Minshutō Party of Japan, a member of the House of Representatives in the Diet (national legislature)
- Toru Matsuoka, politician of the Minshutō Party of Japan, a member of the House of Councillors in the Diet (national legislature)
- Rentarō Mikuni, actor
- Manabu Miyazaki, writer, social critic and public figure
- Kenji Nakagami, writer, critic, and poet
- Hiromu Nonaka, chief cabinet secretary (1998–1999)

== See also ==
- Departures (2008 film)
- Racism in Japan
- Human rights in Japan
- Baekjeong, the former outcast community of Korean society
- Dalit, a collective term for the outcast endogamous communities of South Asia
- Cagot or Agotes, the former outcast community of France and Spain
- Tanka (danhu) ('boat people') in Guangdong, Fuzhou Tanka in Fujian, si-min ('small people') and mianhu in Jiangsu, Gaibu and Duomin (To min; 惰民; duò mín; ''idle/lazy/fallen/indolent people'') in Zhejiang, jiuxing yumin (九姓魚民; jiǔxìng yúmín; ''nine name fishermen'' in the Yangtze River region, yoh-hu ('music people') in Shanxi
- Bụi đời, the outcast community of Vietnam after the Fall of Saigon
