= Nishinari-ku =

Ward of Osaka, Japan

Coordinates: 34°38′6″N 135°29′40″E

Location of Nishinari-ku in Osaka City

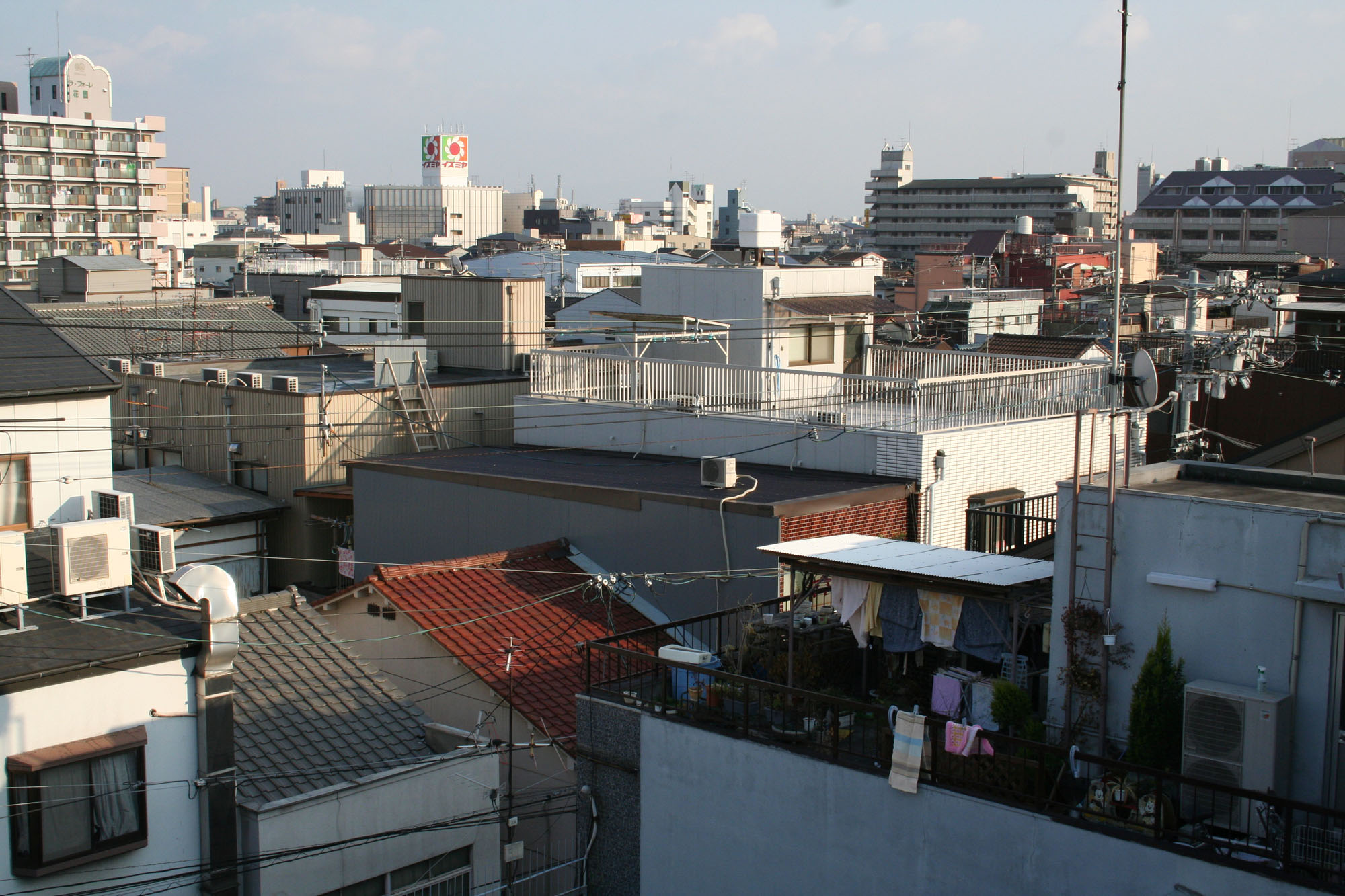
The rooftops in Nishinari

Nishinari-ku (西成区) is one of the 24 wards of Osaka, and among the poorest territories in Japan. It lies directly south of the Namba transport hub and extends further south toward Sumiyoshi Park. It is served by the Nankai Railway lines as well as the Yotsubashi and Sakaisuji subway lines. Nishinari-ku is also home to a number of shitamachi ("lower-town") shōtengai (covered shopping streets). Kamagasaki in Nishinari-ku is home to many day-laborers and most of the homeless people in Osaka.

== Social conditions ==
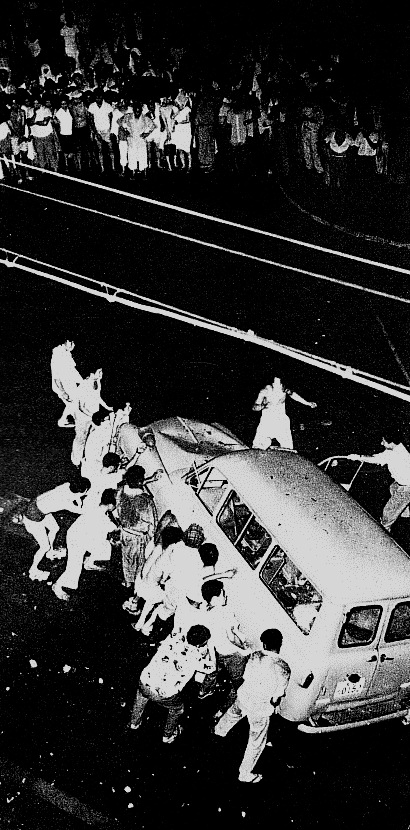
Airin Riot in 1961

Nishinari is close to Shinsekai, and west of one of the wealthiest districts of Osaka, Abeno. The district has a historical reputation for being "sketchy and dangerous". At least two designated yakuza groups, the Sakaume-gumi and the Azuma-gumi, are based in Nishinari. The area is currently undergoing gentrification, which has accelerated in 2025 as part of slum clearance efforts. In preparation for Expo 2025, the government ordered the closure of the Airin Labor and Welfare Center, a symbol of Kamagasaki since its opening in 1970.

== Transport ==
=== West Japan Railway Company ===
- Osaka Loop Line: Shin-Imamiya Station

=== Osaka Metro ===
- Midōsuji Line: Dōbutsuen-mae Station
- Sakaisuji Line: Dōbutsuen-mae Station, Tengachaya Station
- Yotsubashi Line: Hanazonocho Station, Kishinosato Station, Tamade Station

=== Nankai Railway ===
- Nankai Main Line: Shin-Imamiya Station, Tengachaya Station, Kishinosatotamade Station
- Kōya Line: Shin-Imamiya Station, Haginochaya Station, Tengachaya Station, Kishinosatotamade Station
- Shiomibashi Line: Kizugawa Station, Tsumori Station, Nishi-Tengachaya Station, Kishinosatotamade Station

=== Hankai Railway ===
- Hankai Line: Minamikasumicho Station, Imaike Station, Imafune Station, Matsudacho Station, Kitatengachaya Station, Shotenzaka Station, Tenjinnomori Station, Higashitamade Station, Tsukanishi Station

== Education ==
Public elementary and junior high schools are operated by the Osaka City Board of Education. The public high schools are operated by the Osaka Prefectural Board of Education.

=== Elementary schools ===
- Imamiya Elementary School
- Kishinosato Elementary School
- Kitatsumori Elementary School
- Koji Elementary School
- Senbon Elementary School
- Tachibana Elementary School
- Tamade Elementary School
- Tsumori Elementary School
- Tengachaya Elementary School
- Nagahashi Elementary School
- Haginochaya Elementary School
- Bainan Elementary School
- Matsunomiya Elementary School
- Minamitsumori Elementary School

=== Junior high schools ===
- Imamiya Junior High School
- Tsurumibashi Junior High School
- Tengachaya Junior High School
- Seinan Junior High School
- Bainan Junior High School
- Tamade Junior High School

=== High schools ===
- Imamiya Technical High School
- Nishinari High School

== Notable people ==
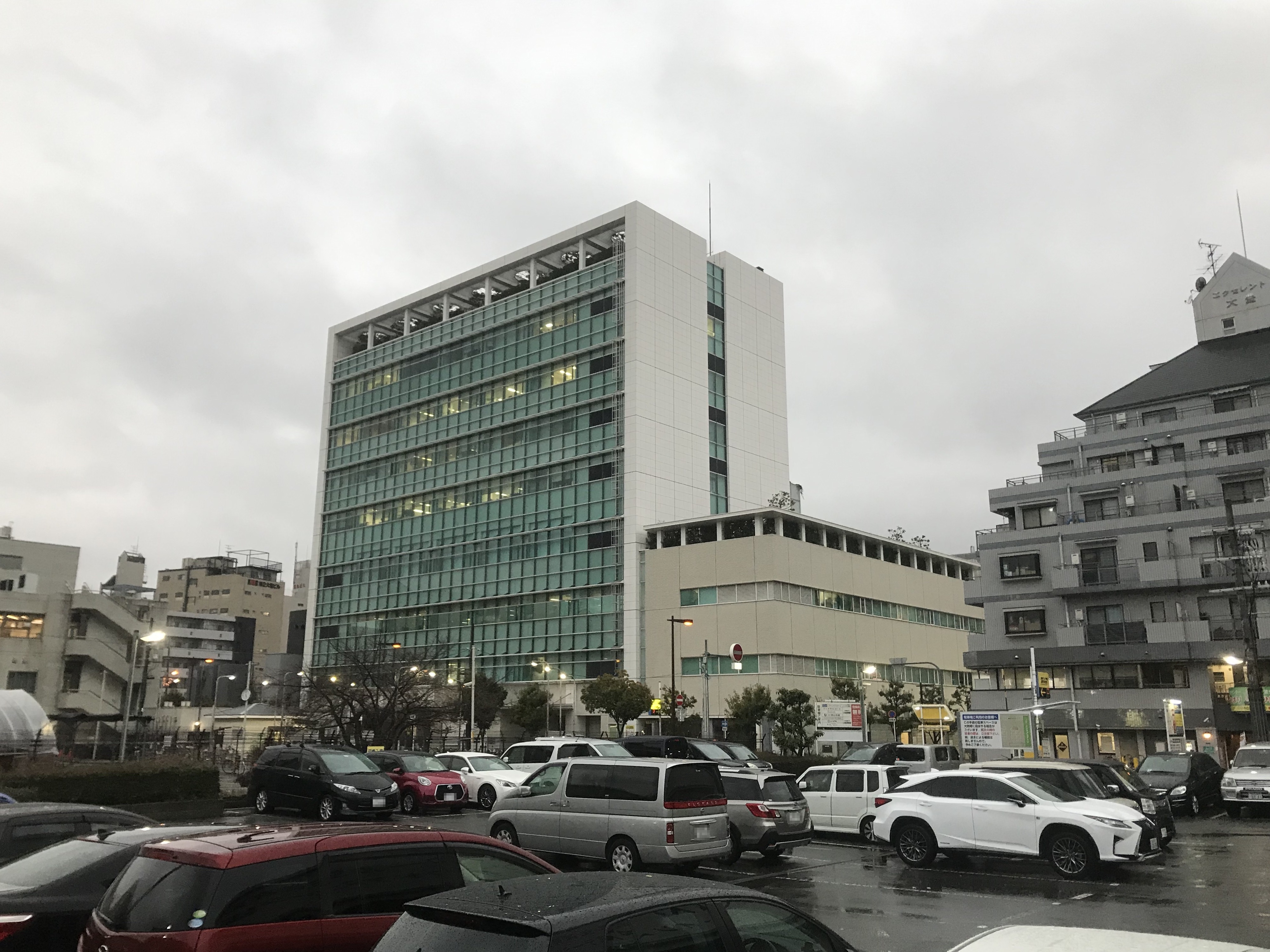
Nishinari Ward Office

- Yoshie Kashiwabara, singer
- Yashiki Takajin, singer and television personality
- Kiichi Kunimoto, mixed martial artist

== See also ==
- Kamagasaki, day laborers' district
- Tobita Shinchi, brothel district
