= Parks Tower (Namba Parks) =

Skyscraper in Japan

Coordinates: 34°39′42″N 135°30′04″E

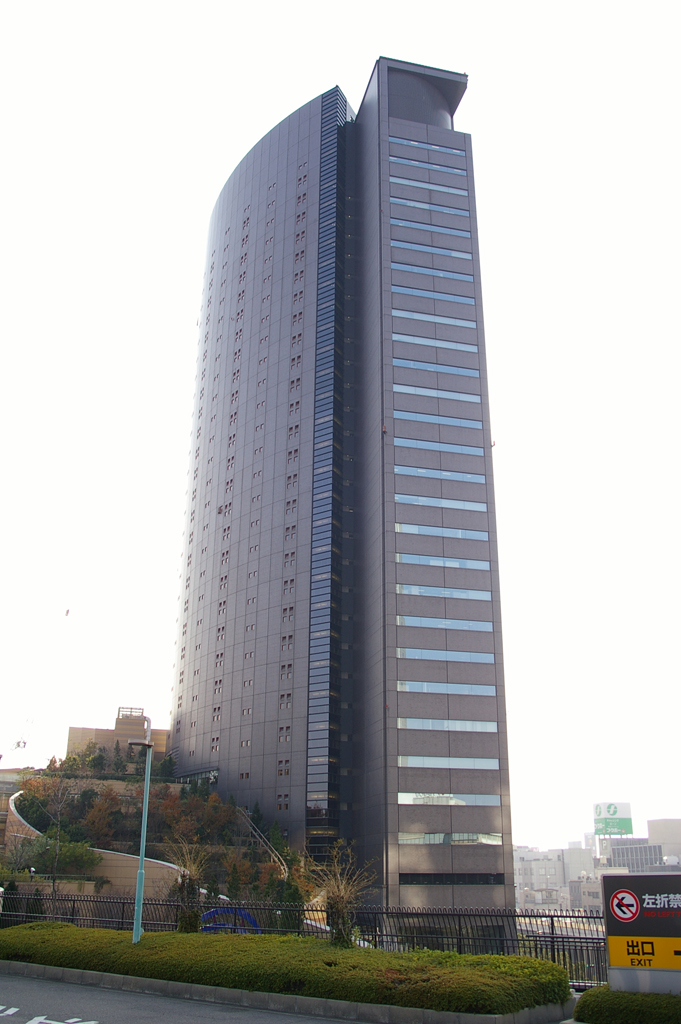
Parks Tower in Namba Parks

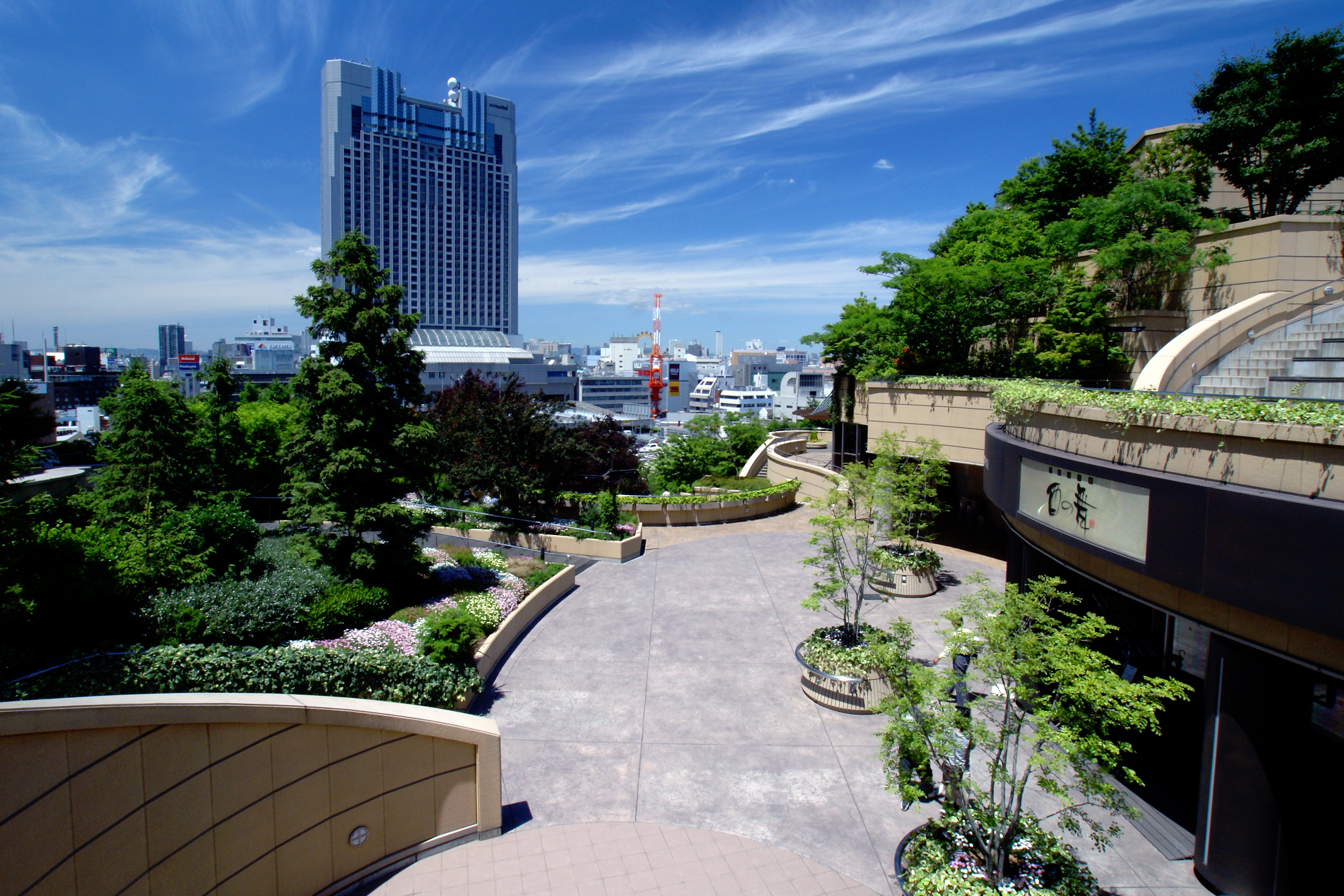
Overhead view of Namba Parks

Parks Tower (パークスタワー) is a 30- floor-and-149- meter high skyscraper located in the Namba Parks complex in the Namba district, Naniwa-ku, Osaka, Japan.

It was designed by Nikken Sekkei Ltd. and constructed by Takenaka Corporation in 2003. The building later earned the nickname "PS3 Building" in 2010 as it bore a striking resemblance to the original PlayStation 3 console.

== See also ==
- List of tallest buildings in Osaka
