= Ashiharabashi Station =

Railway station in Osaka, Japan

Coordinates: 34°39′32.5″N 135°29′20.1″E

Ashiharabashi Station 芦原橋駅
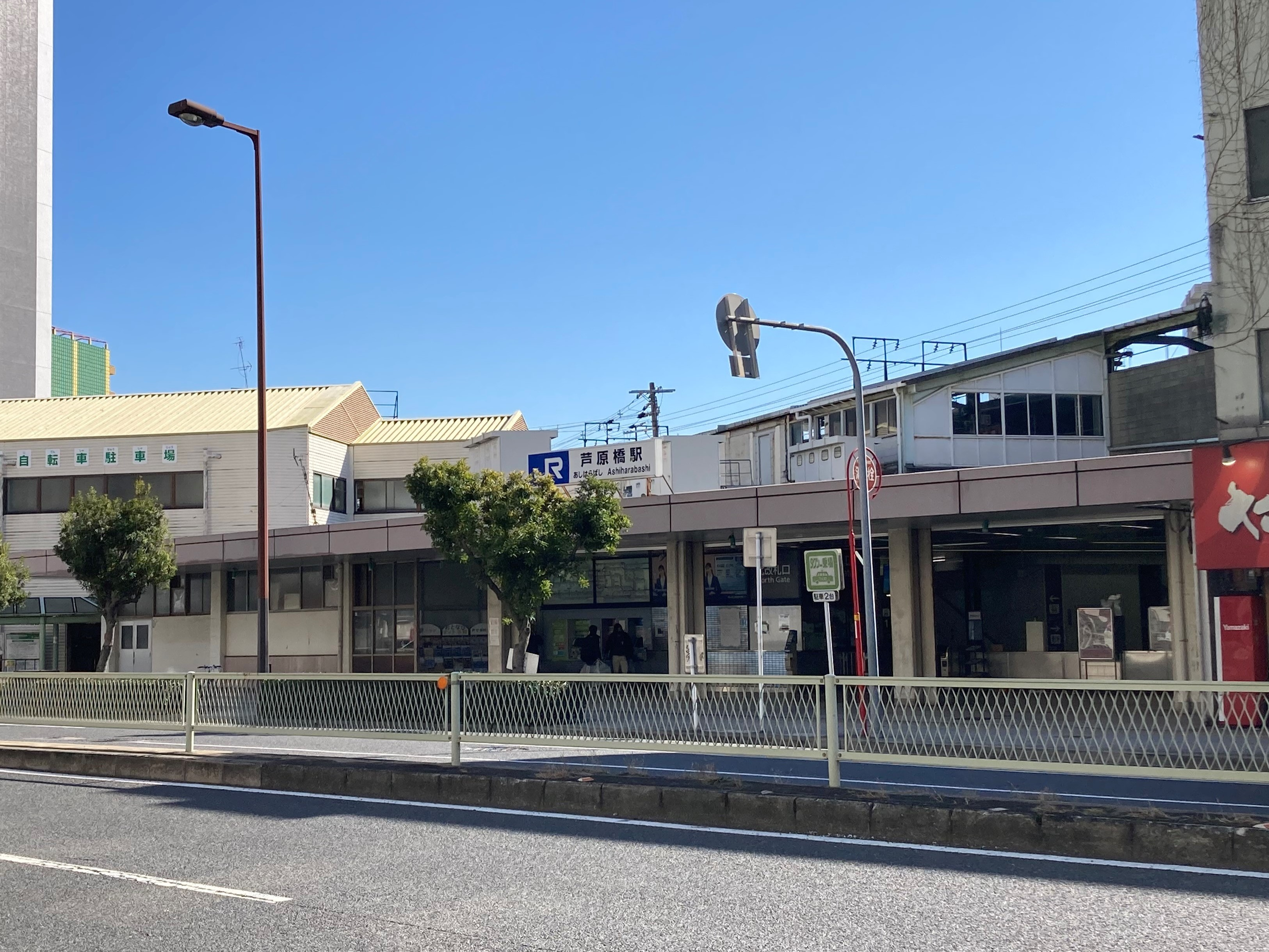
- North gate of the station

General information
- Location: Naniwa, Osaka, Osaka; Japan
- Operator: JR West
- Line: Osaka Loop Line

Other information
- Station code: JR-O17

History
- Opened: 1966
Location

Ashiharabashi Station (芦原橋駅, Ashiharabashi-eki) is a railway station on the West Japan Railway Company Osaka Loop Line in Naniwa-ku, Osaka, Japan. The station opened on April 1, 1966.

Ashiharachō Station on the Shiombashi Line of Nankai Electric Railway is approximately 200m away.

== Layout ==
There are two side platforms with two tracks elevated.

| 1 | ■ Osaka Loop Line | inner track for Shin-Imamiya and Tennoji |
| 2 | ■ Osaka Loop Line | outer track for Nishikujo and Osaka |

== History ==
Station numbering was introduced in March 2018 with Ashiharabashi being assigned station number JR-O17.

== Adjacent stations ==
| « | Service | » |
Osaka Loop Line
| Taishō | Local | Imamiya |
| Taishō | Regional Rapid | Imamiya |
| Taishō | Direct Rapid (Clockwise trains only) | Imamiya |
Yamatoji Rapid: Does not stop at this station
Rapid: Does not stop at this station
Kansai Airport Rapid: Does not stop at this station
Kishuji Rapid: Does not stop at this station
Limited Express Kuroshio: Does not stop at this station
Limited Express Haruka: Does not stop at this station
