= Naniwa-ku =

Ward of Osaka, Japan

Coordinates: 34°39′34″N 135°29′58.67″E

Location of Naniwa-ku in Osaka City

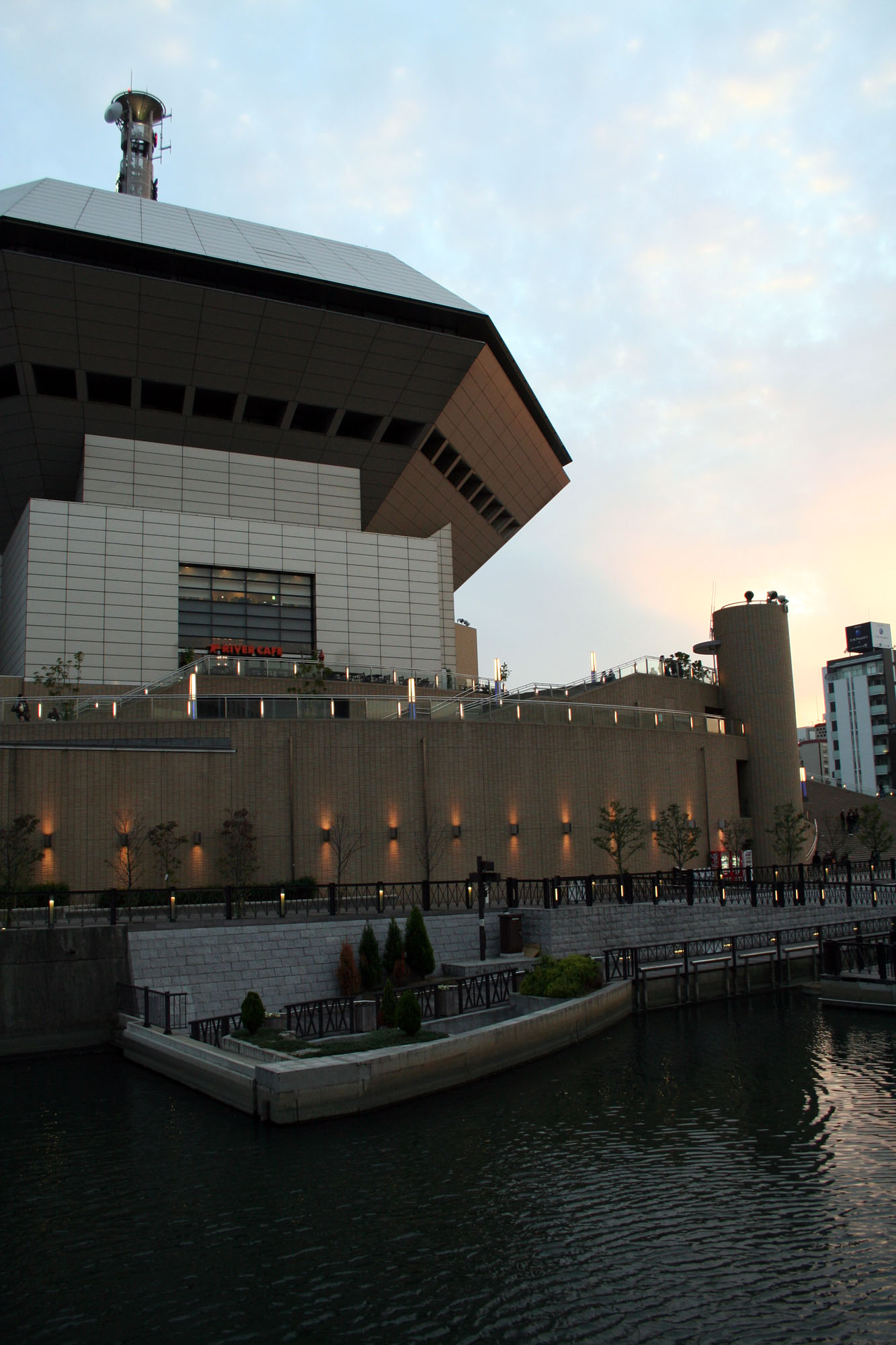
Minato-machi River Place

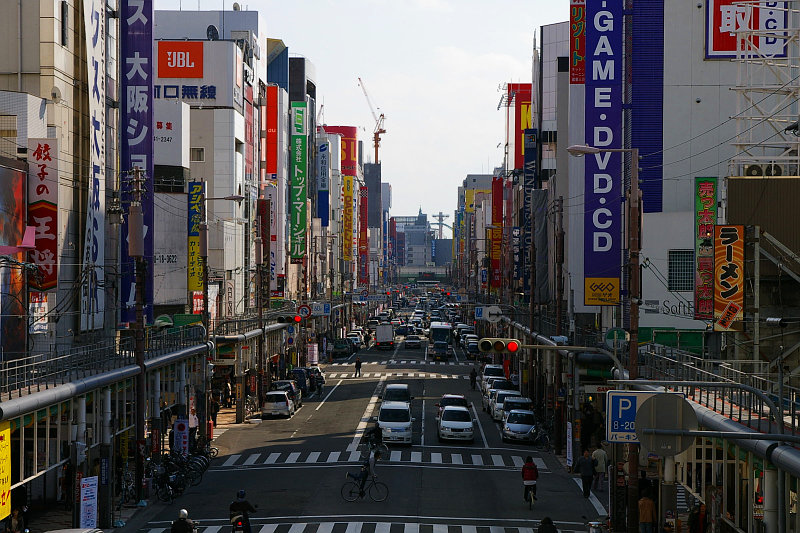
Den Den Town

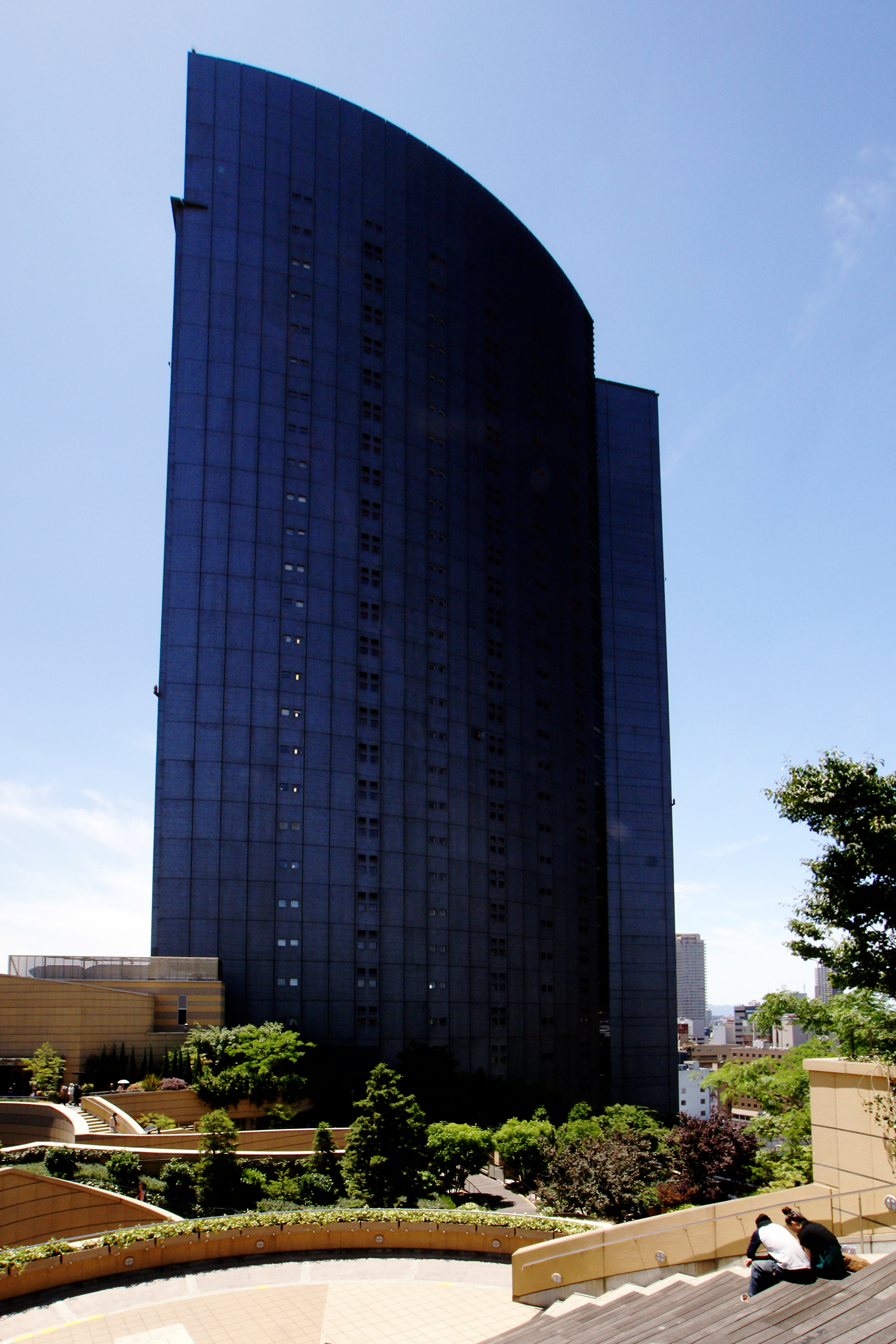
Parks Tower

Naniwa-ku (浪速区) is one of 24 wards of Osaka, Japan. It has an area of 4.37 km^{2}, and a population of 51,567.

== General information ==
Largely a residential area itself, Naniwa-ku is adjacent to and has in recent years blurred into the Namba district, which is south Osaka's transport hub and centre of commerce, entertainment, shopping, and culture.

Naniwa retains significant Burakumin and Korean communities. The plight and struggle of both communities in Japan is represented in Liberty Osaka (Osaka Human Rights Museum).

Almost the entire ward was decimated in air attacks during bombing in March 1945. Few buildings pre-dating World War II remain.

== Attractions ==
Naniwa is the site of a number of well-known commercial areas like Nipponbashi, where Capcom and SNK are headquartered. Locally known as Den Den Town (Electric City), Nipponbashi was traditionally a concentration for Osaka's electrical appliance outlets, though the emergence of several large electrical department stores over in recent years has seen its shop space make a gradual shift away from the electrical appliance sector. Directly to its south is Shin Sekai (New World), an entertainment district famous for the Tsutenkaku Tower and Janjan Alley.

Amongst Naniwa's sites is the Imamiya Ebisu Shrine, which sponsors the lively Toka Ebisu Festival. Naniwa is the site of the Osaka Prefectural Gymnasium (Osaka-furitsu taiiku-kaikan), where the Grand Sumo Tournament is held in March (Ozumo Sangatsu Basho) and Liberty Osaka - the Osaka Human Rights Museum. Naniwa also contains the massive modern shopping, dining, and entertainment complex, Namba Parks.

== Landmarks ==
- Den Den Town
- Festival Gate
- Imamiya Ebisu Shrine
- Namba City
- Namba Parks
- Osaka City Air Terminal
- Osaka Prefectural Gymnasium
- Tsutenkaku
- Liberty Osaka (Osaka Human Rights Museum)
- Sports Palace, Osaka

== Mass media ==
=== Newspaper ===
- Sankei Shimbun - Namba Sankei Building

=== FM Radio Station ===
- FM OSAKA - Minatomachi River Place

== Train stations ==
JR West
Kansai Line (Yamatoji Line): Shin-Imamiya Station - Imamiya Station - JR Namba Station
Osaka Loop Line: Ashiharabashi Station - Imamiya Station - Shin-Imamiya Station
Nankai Railway (In registration, Namba Station on Nankai Railway is located in Chūō-ku, and Shin-Imamiya Station in Nishinari-ku)
Nankai Main Line: Imamiyaebisu Station (only local trains of the Koya Line stop)
Kōya Line (Shiomibashi Branch): Shiomibashi Station - Ashiharachō Station
Hanshin Railway
Hanshin Namba Line Sakuragawa Station
Osaka Metro (In registration, Namba Station is located in Chūō-ku)
Midōsuji Line: Daikokuchō Station
Yotsubashi Line: Namba Station (a platform) - Daikokuchō Station
Sennichimae Line: Sakuragawa Station
Sakaisuji Line: Ebisuchō Station
Hankai Tramway (In registration, Minami-Kasumichō Station is located in Nishinari-ku)
Hankai Line: Ebisuchō Station

== Education ==
The Osaka Chinese School is in Naniwa-ku.

== Companies headquartered in Naniwa-ku, Osaka ==
- Kubota
- Nankai Electric Railway
- Pixela Corporation
- Tabio

== Notable people from Naniwa-ku, Osaka ==
- Atomi Kakei, Japanese calligrapher, painter, scholar and educator
- Daizen Takahiro, Japanese sumo wrestler
- Junko Noda, Japanese voice actress and singer
- Kazumi Takahashi, Japanese novelist and scholar
- Masatoshi Hamada, Japanese comedian (Downtown)
- Shinobu Orikuchi, Japanese ethnologist, linguist, folklorist, novelist, and poet
- Nakamoto Yuta, japanese singer, kpop group member NCT, NCT127, actor
