= Tsumori =

Tsumori may refer to:

- Tsumori Chisato (津森 千里), Japanese fashion designer
- Yuki Tsumori (津森 宥紀), Japanese professional baseball
- Tsumori Station (津守駅, Tsumori-eki), train station in Nishinari-ku, Osaka City, Osaka Prefecture, Japan
