= Kizugawa Station =

Railway station in Osaka, Japan

Kizugawa Station 木津川駅
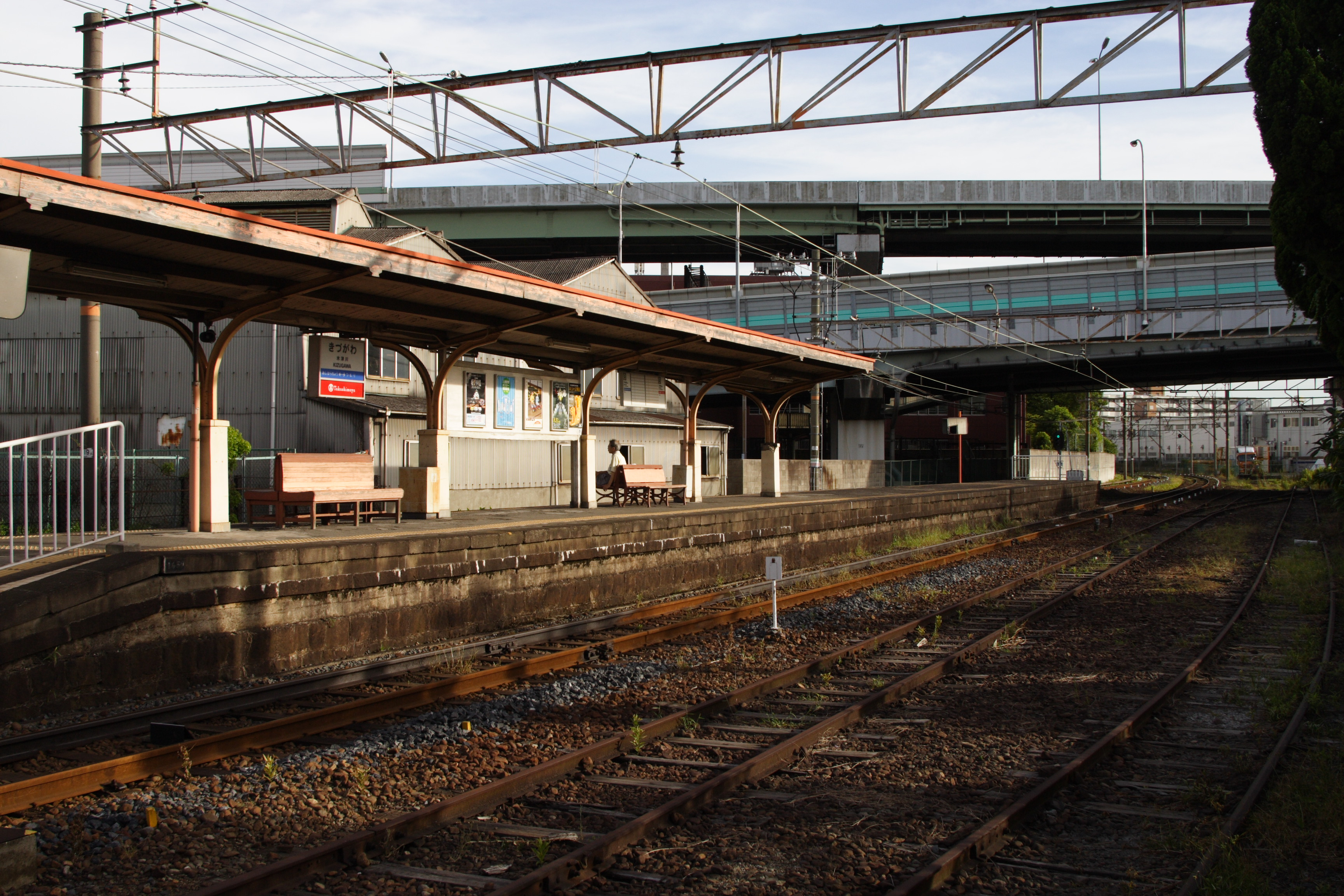
- Kizugawa Station in August 2007

General information
- Location: Nishinari-ku, Osaka; Osaka Prefecture; Japan
- Coordinates: 34.6547°N 135.4829°E
- Operator: Nankai Electric Railway
- Line: Koya Line (Shiomibashi Line)

Other information
- Station code: NK06-3
- Website: Official website

History
- Opened: September 1900

Services
Preceding station	Nankai Electric Railway	Following station
Ashiharachō towards Shiomibashi	Kōya Line Shiomibashi Line	Tsumori towards Kishinosato-Tamade
Location
- Location within Japan

Kizugawa Station (木津川駅, Kizugawa-eki) is a train station in Nishinari-ku, Osaka, Osaka Prefecture, Japan, operated by the private railway operator Nankai Electric Railway.

== Lines ==
Kizugawa Station is served by the Koya Line (Shiomibashi Branch), and has the station number "NK06-3".

== See also ==
- List of railway stations in Japan
