= Namba Parks =

Office and shopping complex in Osaka, Japan

Coordinates: 34°39′41″N 135°30′06″E

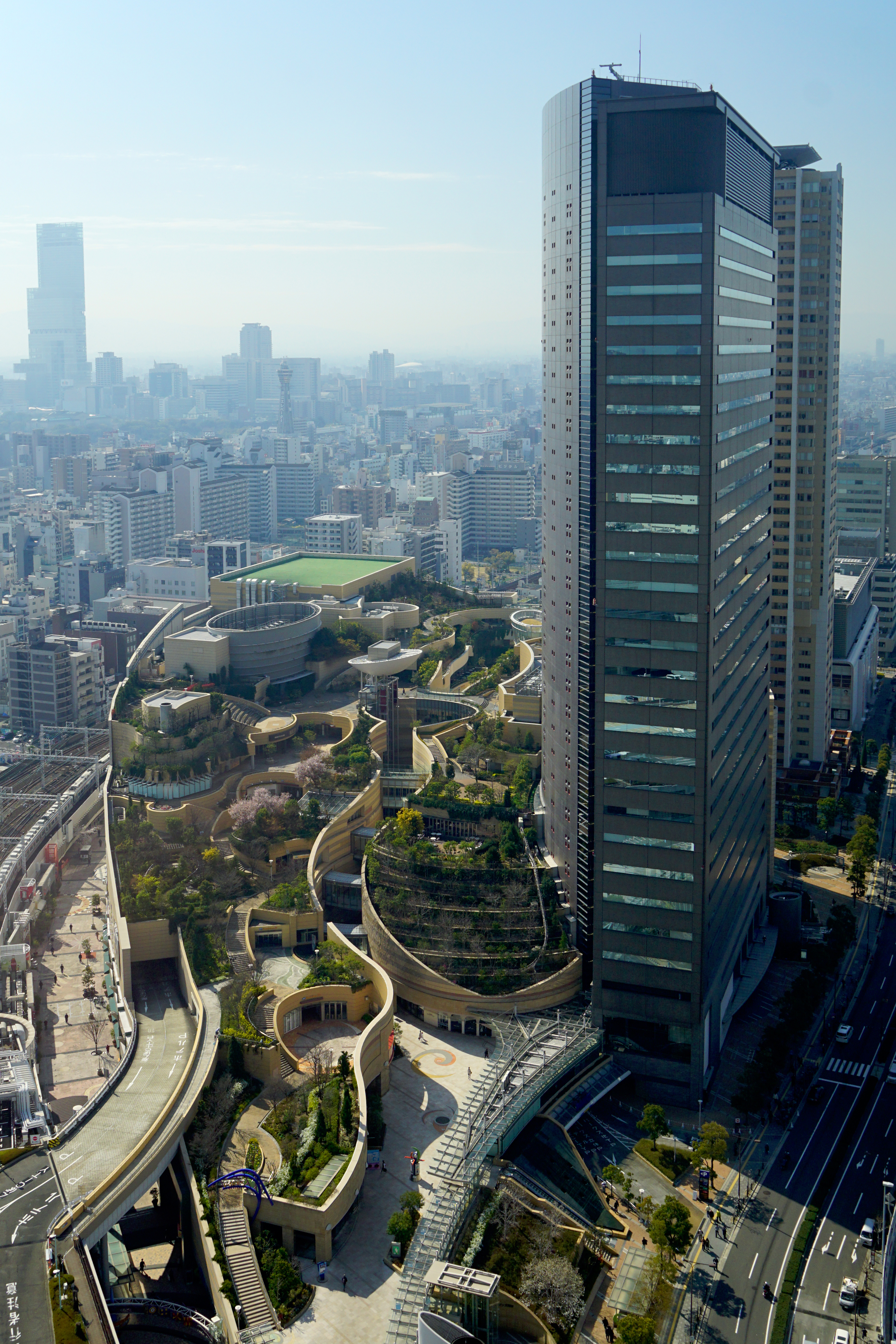
Above Namba Parks

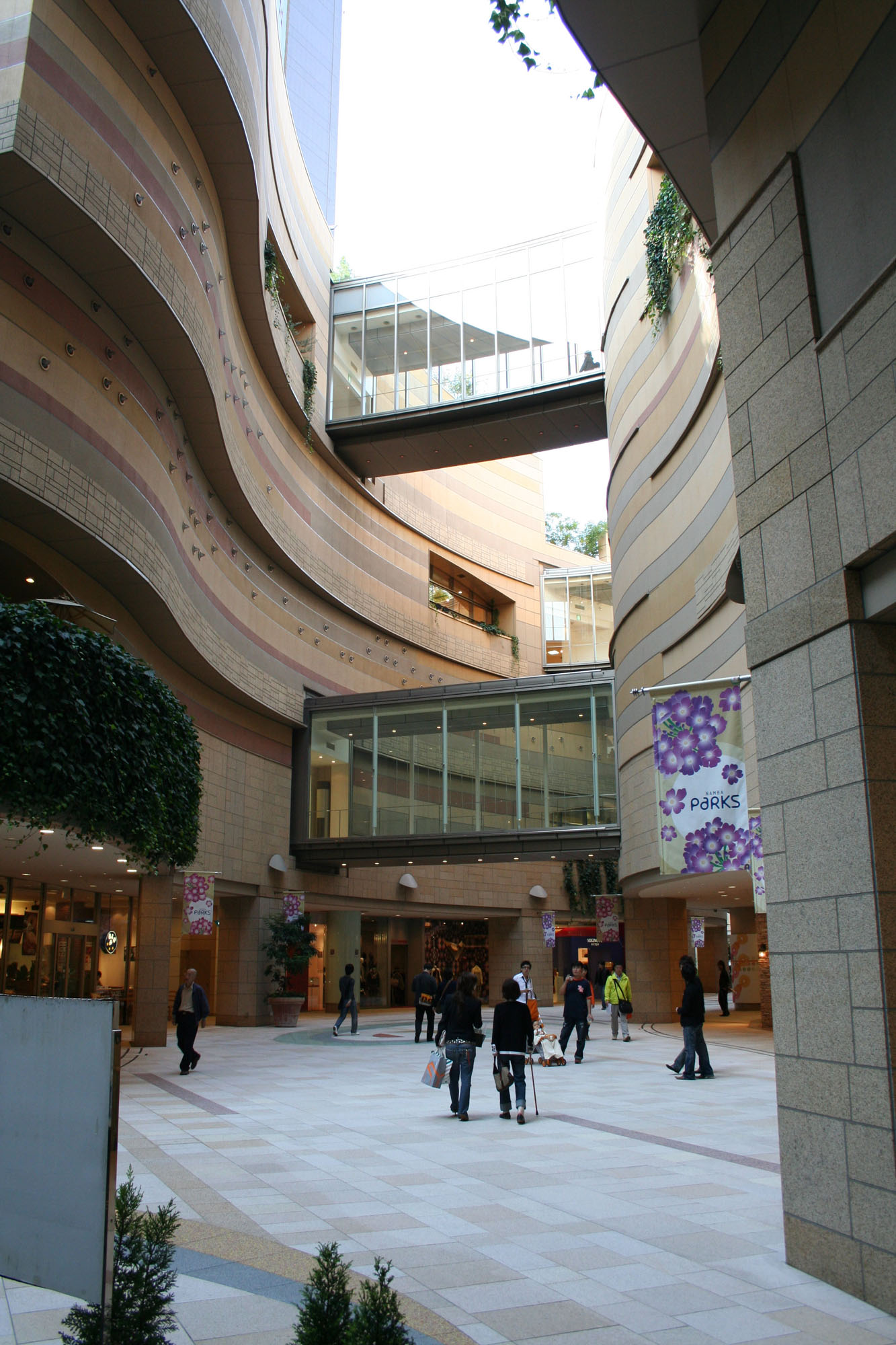
Inside Namba Parks

Namba Parks (なんばパークス, Nanba Pākusu) is an office and shopping complex located in Namba-naka Nichome, Naniwa-ku, Osaka, Japan, the south of Namba Station on Nankai Railway. It consists of a high-rise office building called Parks Tower and a 120-tenant shopping mall with rooftop garden. Namba Parks was developed by Jon Jerde of The Jerde Partnership in the footprint of the since-closed Osaka Stadium.

There is a carnival mall on the 1st floor. Various shops are available on 2nd to 5th floor. Casual restaurants are located on 6th floor while fine-dining restaurants, such as Japanese, Korean, and Italian, are on the 7th and 8th floor. The 9th floor (topmost) has a landscape garden. There is also an amphitheater for live shows, as well as space for small personal vegetable gardens and wagon shops.

Namba Parks was conceived as a large park, a natural intervention in Osaka's dense urban condition. Alongside a 30-story tower, the project features a lifestyle commercial center crowned with a rooftop park that crosses multiple blocks while gradually ascending eight levels. In addition to providing a highly visible green component in a city where nature is sparse, the sloping park connects to the street, making it easy for passers-by to enter its groves of trees, clusters of rocks, cliffs, lawn, streams, waterfalls, ponds and outdoor terraces. Beneath the park, a canyon carves a path through specialty retail, entertainment and dining venues.

== See also ==
Jerde-associated architectural projects in Japan:

- Canal City Hakata (Fukuoka)
- Riverwalk Kitakyushu
- Roppongi Hills (Tokyo)
