= Ashiharachō Station =

Railway station in Osaka, Japan

Ashiharachō Station 芦原町駅
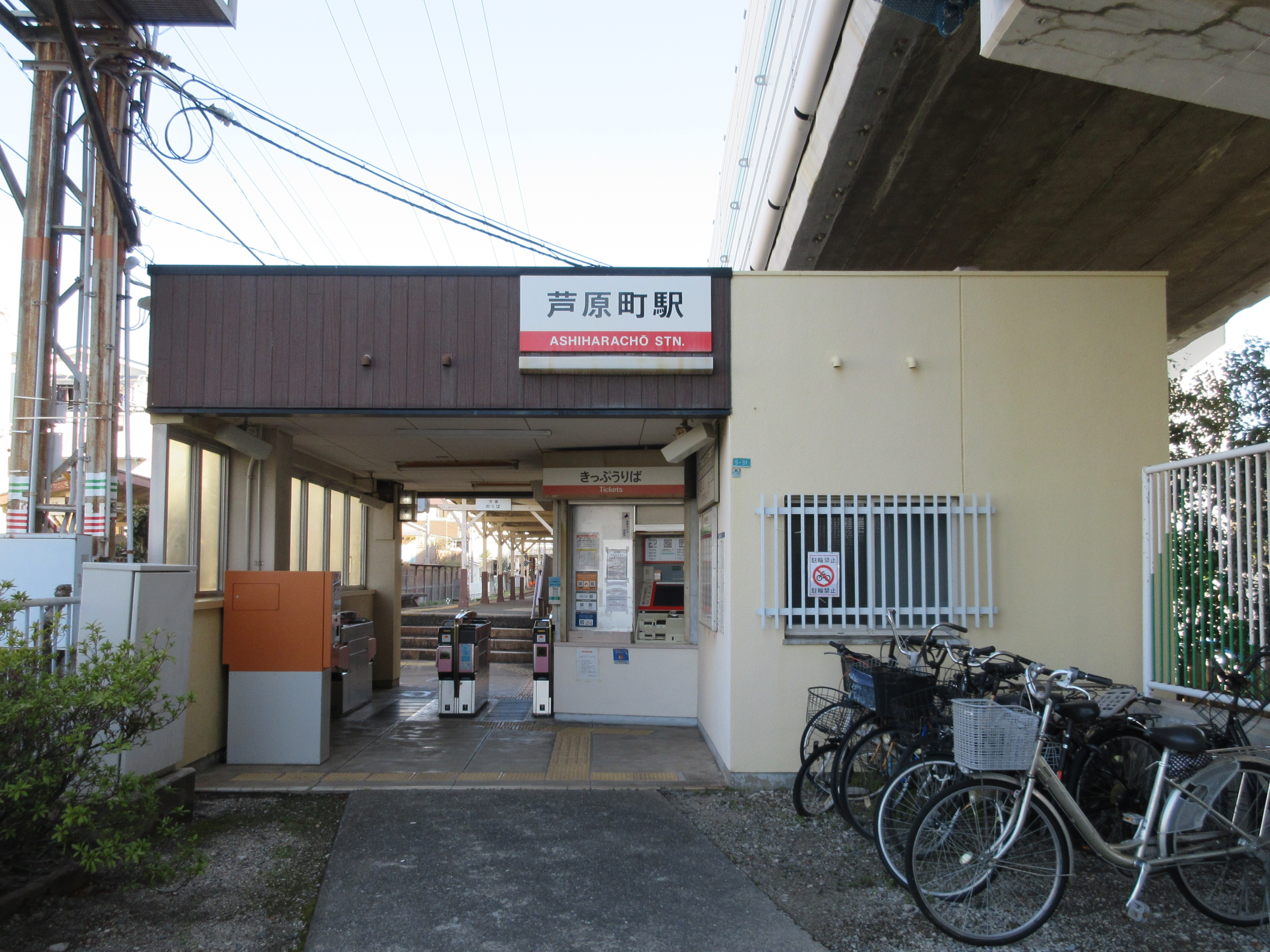
- Ashiharachō Station in March 2023

General information
- Location: Naniwa-ku, Osaka; Osaka Prefecture; Japan
- Coordinates: 34°39′38″N 135°29′11″E
- Operator: Nankai Electric Railway
- Line: Koya Line (Shiomibashi Branch)
- Platforms: 2 side platforms
- Connections: Ashiharabashi Station

Other information
- Station code: NK06-4
- Website: Official website

History
- Opened: November 1912

Services
| Preceding station | Nankai Electric Railway | Following station |
|---|---|---|
| Shiomibashi Terminus | Kōya Line Shiomibashi Line | Kizugawa towards Kishinosato-Tamade |
Location
- Location within Japan

Ashiharachō Station (芦原町駅, Ashiharachō-eki) is a railway station in Naniwa-ku, Osaka, Osaka Prefecture, Japan, operated by the private railway operator Nankai Electric Railway.

== Lines ==
Ashiharachō Station is served by the Koya Line (Shiomibashi Branch), and has the station number "NK06-4".

== Layout ==
The station has two side platforms serving one track each.

== Surrounding area ==
Ashiharabashi Station on the Osaka Loop Line is approximately 200m away.

== See also ==
- List of railway stations in Japan
