= Tsumori Station =

Railway station in Osaka, Japan

Tsumori Station 津守駅
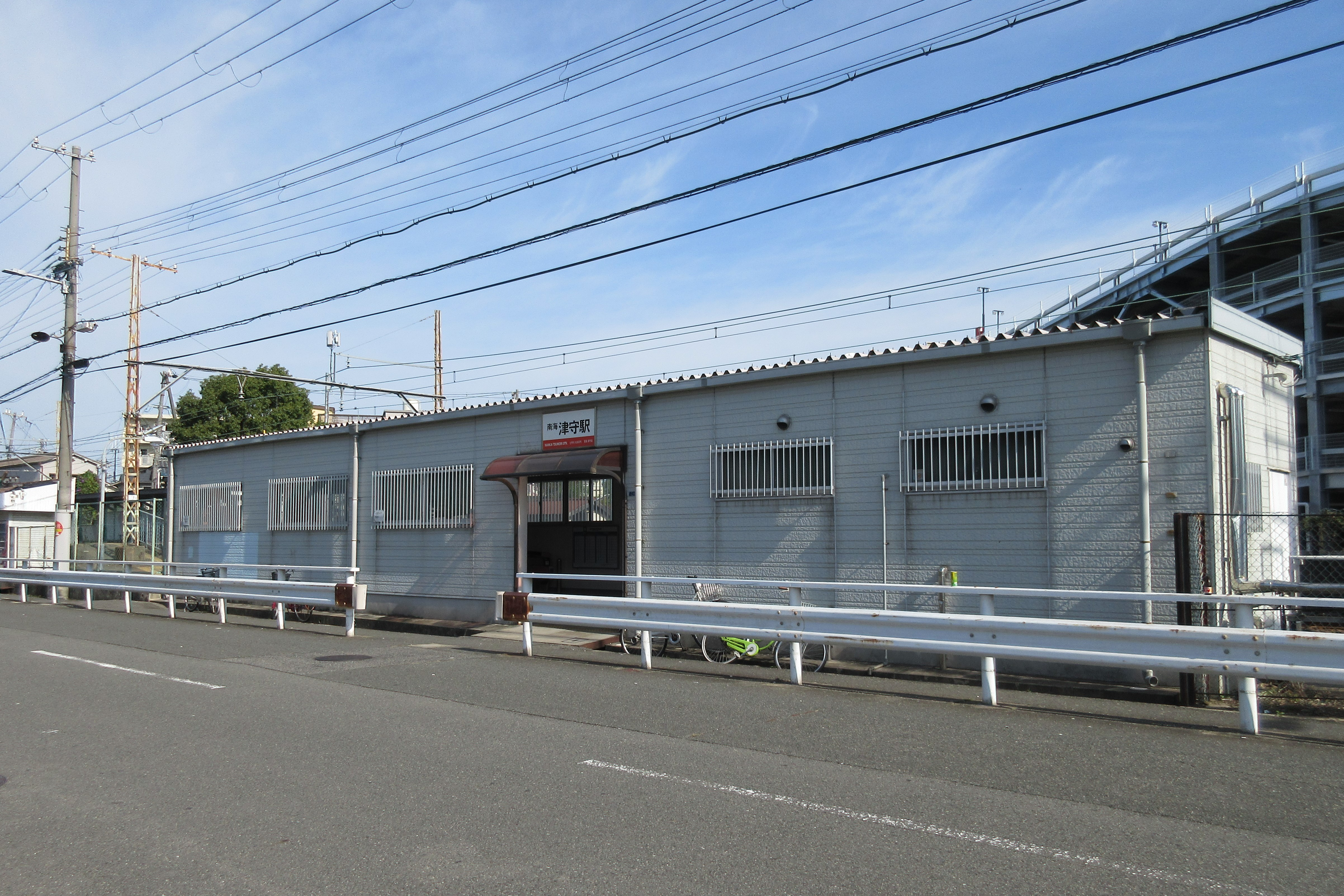
- Tsumori Station building in November 2020

General information
- Location: Nishinari-ku, Osaka; Osaka Prefecture; Japan
- Coordinates: 34.6471°N 135.4832°E
- Operator: Nankai Electric Railway
- Line: Koya Line (Shiomibashi Line)

Other information
- Station code: NK06-2
- Website: Official website

History
- Opened: February 1913

Services
Preceding station	Nankai Electric Railway	Following station
Kizugawa towards Shiomibashi	Kōya Line Shiomibashi Line	Nishi-Tengachaya towards Kishinosato-Tamade
Location
- Location within Japan

Tsumori Station (津守駅, Tsumori-eki) is a train station in Nishinari-ku, Osaka, Osaka Prefecture, Japan, operated by the private railway operator Nankai Electric Railway.

== Lines ==
Tsumori Station is served by the Koya Line (Shiomibashi Line), and has the station number "NK06-2".

== History ==
The station opened in February 1913.

== See also ==
- List of railway stations in Japan
