= Junko Noda =

Japanese voice actress

- 野田 順子
- Born: June 29, 1971 (age 55); Naniwa-ku, Osaka, Japan
- Other names: Junchan (じゅんちゃん); Nodajun (のだじゅん)
- Occupations: Voice actress, singer
- Years active: 1993–present
- Notable work: His and Her Circumstances as Maho Izawa; Love Hina as Mitsune "Kitsune" Konno; Haibane Renmei as Reki; Last Exile as Dio Eraclea; Tokyo Mew Mew as Zakuro Fujiwara; Bleach as Tatsuki Arisawa; Major as Momoko Hoshino; Digimon Adventure 02 as Veemon
- Height: 163 cm (5 ft 4 in)
- Website: nodajun.com

Junko Noda (野田 順子, Noda Junko; born June 29, 1971) is a Japanese freelance voice actress and singer from Naniwa-ku, Osaka. She often voices boyish girls and boys. Having grown up in Osaka, she has also voiced characters who speak in the Kansai dialect, typically in supporting roles.

== Filmography ==
=== Television animation ===
- Best Student Council – Nanaho Kinjo
- Bleach – Tatsuki Arisawa, Shuno
- Boys Be... – Mizuki Takano
- Detective Conan – Eisuke Hondou
- Daphne in the Brilliant Blue – Milly
- Digimon Adventure 02 – Veemon
- Eureka Seven: AO – Bartender
- Fate/stay night – Shiro Emiya (young)
- Fate/stay night: Unlimited Blade Works – Shiro Emiya (young)
- Fate/Zero – Shiro Emiya (young)
- Gosick – Julie Guile
- Great Teacher Onizuka – Miyabi Aizawa
- Gun X Sword – Joshua Lundgren
- Haibane Renmei – Reki
- His and Her Circumstances – Maho Isawa
- Hugtto! PreCure – Harriham Harry (fairy form)
- Inuyasha – Bunza Suekichi
- Jujutsu Kaisen – Nagi Yoshino
- Last Exile – Dio Eraclea
- Last Exile: Fam, The Silver Wing – Dio Eraclea
- Kirby: Right Back at Ya! – Lovely
- Love Hina – Mitsune Konno
- Maburaho – Kaori Iba
- Magical Shopping Arcade Abenobashi
- Mega Man NT Warrior – IceMan, Maddy
- Mega Man NT Warrior: Axess – IceMan, Maddy
- Oban Star-Racers – Molly / Eva Wei
- One Piece – Tashigi, Kappa, Haruta, Franky (young)
- Record of Lodoss War: Chronicles of the Heroic Knight – Deedlit (ep. 22–27), Arteen (ep. 1)
- Sgt. Frog – Karara
- Soul Eater – Mira Naigus
- Soul Eater Not! – Mira Naigus
- Squid Girl – Noh Mask Rider
- Tenchi Muyo! War on Geminar – Aura Shurifon
- Today's Menu for the Emiya Family – Otoko Hotaruzuka, Shiro Emiya (young)
- Tokyo Mew Mew – Zakuro Fujiwara, Masha
- Tokyo Underground – Shalma Rufis
- Toriko – Chirin
- xxxHolic – Yuri
- Yuri's World – Pig

=== Original video animation (OVA) ===
- Tenchi Muyo! War on Geminar (2009) – Aura Shurifon

=== Theatrical animation ===
- One Piece Movie: The Desert Princess and the Pirates: Adventures in Alabasta (2007) – Kappa
- Digimon Adventure: Last Evolution Kizuna (2020) – V-mon
- Digimon Adventure 02: The Beginning (2023) – V-mon

=== Video games ===
- Tokimeki Memorial 2 (1999) – Hinomoto Hikari
- Inuyasha (2001) – Suekichi
- Kowai Shashin (2002) – Hiori
- Pac-Man World 2 (2002) – Inky
- Digimon ReArise (2018) – V-mon
- Arknights (2022) – Blacknight

=== Other voice roles ===
- Dynasty Warriors series as Xing Cai (also in Warriors Orochi series)
- Rockman X8 as Lumine
- Tales of Eternia as Celsius, Chat
- Segagaga as Tarō Sega
- Suikoden Tierkreis as Atrie
- Saki: The Nationals as Ikuno Akasaka (substitute coach of Himematsu)

== Music ==
In 2005, Noda provided vocals for an EP with Japanese guitarist Jun Senoue entitled "Ready!". The project is called JxJ (Jun x Junko) and is only available in Japan, though copies have made their way stateside through the Jun Senoue fan page. A notable entry in this album is a vocal cover of "Azure Blue World" from the 1998 video game Sonic Adventure, for which Jun Senoue composed music.
