= Kowai Shashin =

2002 video game

- Developer: Media Entertainment
- Publisher: Media Entertainment
- Director: Masayuki Hiramatsu
- Producer: Atsuko Hayakawa
- Composers: Yusuke Beppu; Shigenori Masuko
- Platform: PlayStation
- Release: JP: July 25, 2002
- Genre: Action
- Mode: Single-player

Kowai Shashin (Japanese: コワイシャシン 〜心霊写真奇譚〜, Hepburn: Kowaishashin ~shinrei shashin kitan~) is a 2002 horror themed action game developed by Media Entertainment for PlayStation.

== Gameplay ==
The player takes on the role of Hiori (緋織), a psychic who has to exorcise evil spirits that dwell in spirit photographs. Using the cursor, the player identifies spirits shown in photographs, and then follows the on-screen instructions to exorcise them.

== Development and release ==
The game was developed by Media Entertainment. It was produced by Atsuko Hayakawa and directed by Masayuki Hiramatsu. The music for the game was composed by Yusuke Beppu and Shigenori Masuko. Hiori, the game's protagonist, was voiced by Junko Noda. The game was published on the PlayStation console in Japan by Media Entertainment on July 25, 2002.

== Reception ==
Reception

Review score
Publication	Score
Famitsu	5/10, 6/10, 6/10, 5/10

Kowai Shashin was reviewed by four critics in the Japanese magazine Famitsu. The four reviewers all found the game to be grow monotonous as the game went on. One reviewer said the first time you make the seal it was exciting due to the game's strange atmosphere, but after it became a chore. One reviewer said that the game was more gross and in poor taste than being scary and that it ultimately became a chore as the gameplay consisted of mostly button mashing.

Following Kowai Shashin's release, several rumors and urban legends about the game and its production process arose on the Internet. According to them, the photos used in the game were supposedly of "real" ghosts. It was rumored that members of the game's development team experienced "depressive episodes, seizures, accidents, and auditory hallucinations" during production. The game's creator was alleged to have committed suicide. The rumors gained notoriety on Japanese platforms and image boards such as 2chan. The rumors were supposedly started by Media Entertainment as an attempt at viral marketing, similar to that behind The Blair Witch Project.
