= Nishi-Tengachaya Station =

Railway station in Osaka, Japan

Nishi-Tengachaya Station 西天下茶屋駅
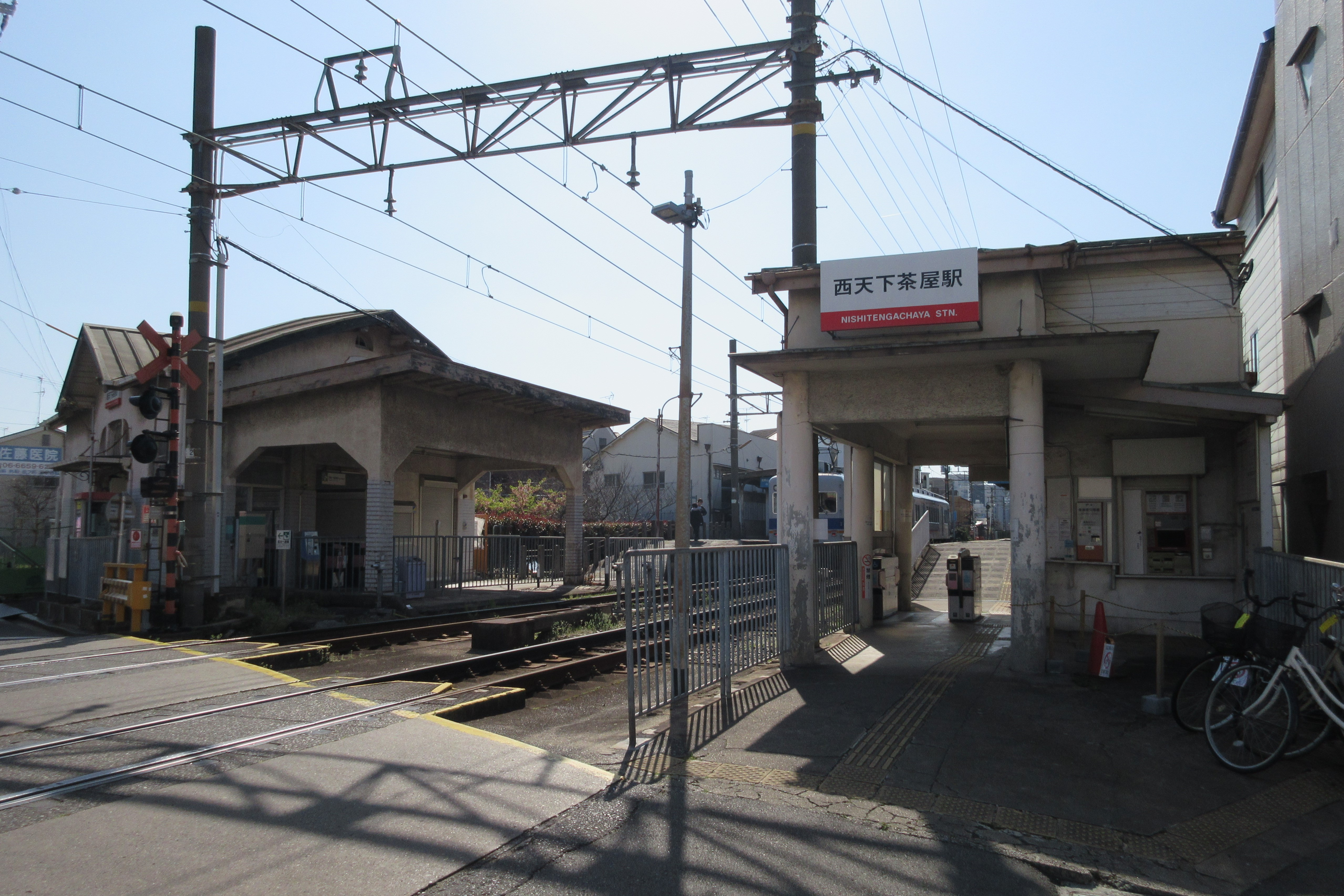
- Nishi-Tengachaya Station building in March 2023

General information
- Location: Nishinari-ku, Osaka; Osaka Prefecture; Japan
- Coordinates: 34.6390°N 135.4889°E
- Operator: Nankai Electric Railway
- Line: Koya Line (Shiomibashi Line)

Other information
- Station code: NK06-1
- Website: Official website

History
- Opened: September 1915

Services
Preceding station	Nankai Electric Railway	Following station
Tsumori towards Shiomibashi	Kōya Line Shiomibashi Line	Kishinosato-Tamade Terminus
Location
- Location within Japan

Nishi-Tengachaya Station (西天下茶屋駅, Nishi-Tengachaya-eki) is a train station in Nishinari-ku, Osaka, Osaka Prefecture, Japan, operated by the private railway operator Nankai Electric Railway.

== Lines ==
Nishi-Tengachaya Station is served by the Koya Line (Shiomibashi Line), and has the station number "NK06-1".

== History ==
The station opened in September 1915.

== See also ==
- List of railway stations in Japan
