= Imamiya Station =

Railway station in Osaka, Japan

JR Imamiya Station JR 今宮駅
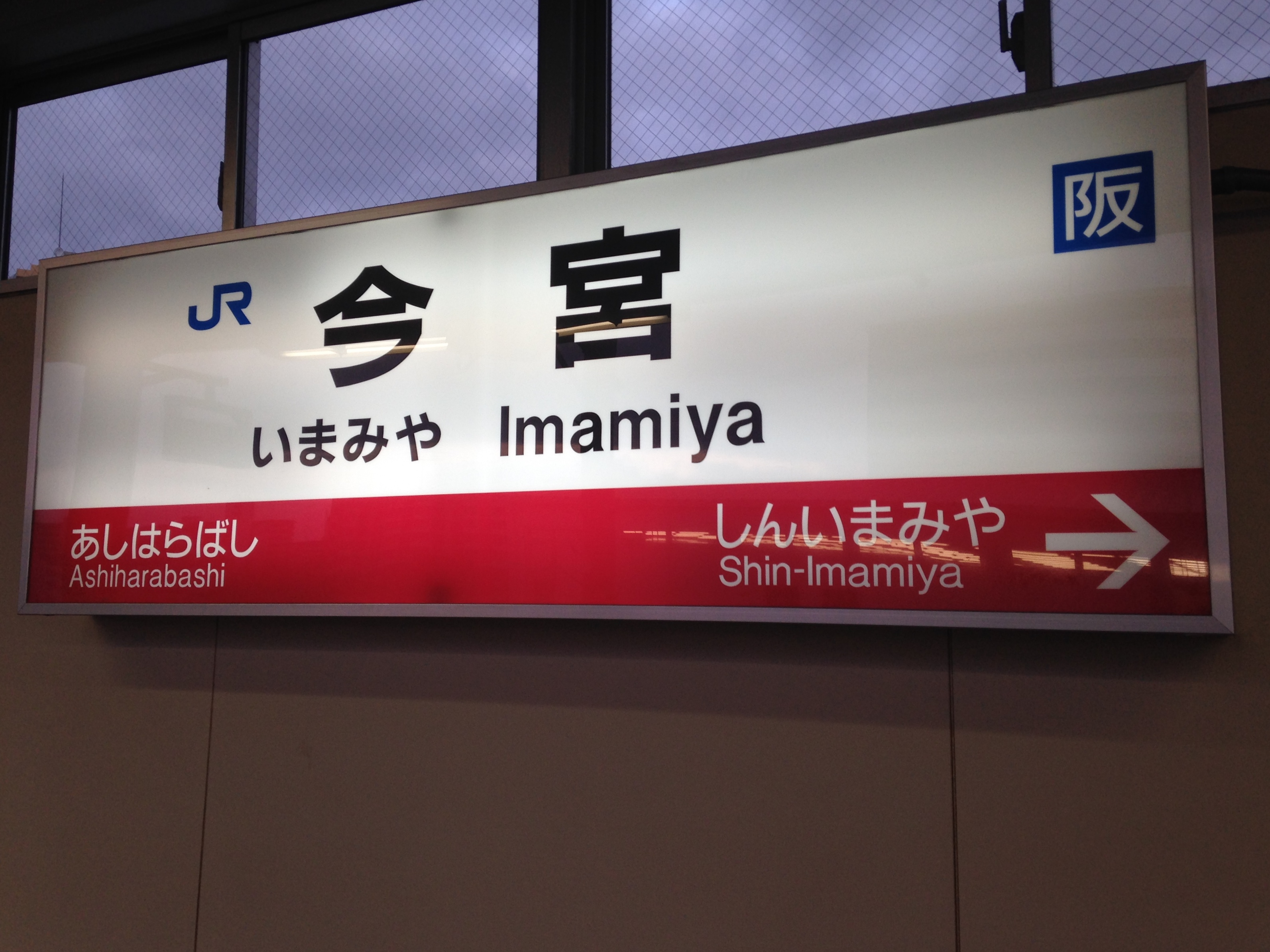
- Imamiya Station Sign

General information
- Location: 3-chōme-13 Daikoku, Naniwa Ward, Osaka City; Osaka Prefecture; Japan
- Coordinates: 34.6543°N 135.4930°E
- Operator: JR West
- Lines: Q Yamatoji Line; O Osaka Loop Line
- Platforms: 4 - one island platform, two side platforms
- Tracks: 4

Construction
- Structure type: Elevated

Other information
- Station code: JR-Q18, JR-O18

History
- Opened: 1 March 1899; 127 years ago
Location
- Location within Osaka Prefecture Location within Kansai region Location within Japan

Imamiya Station (今宮駅, Imamiya-eki) is a railway station on the Kansai Main Line (Yamatoji Line) in Naniwa-ku, Osaka, Japan.

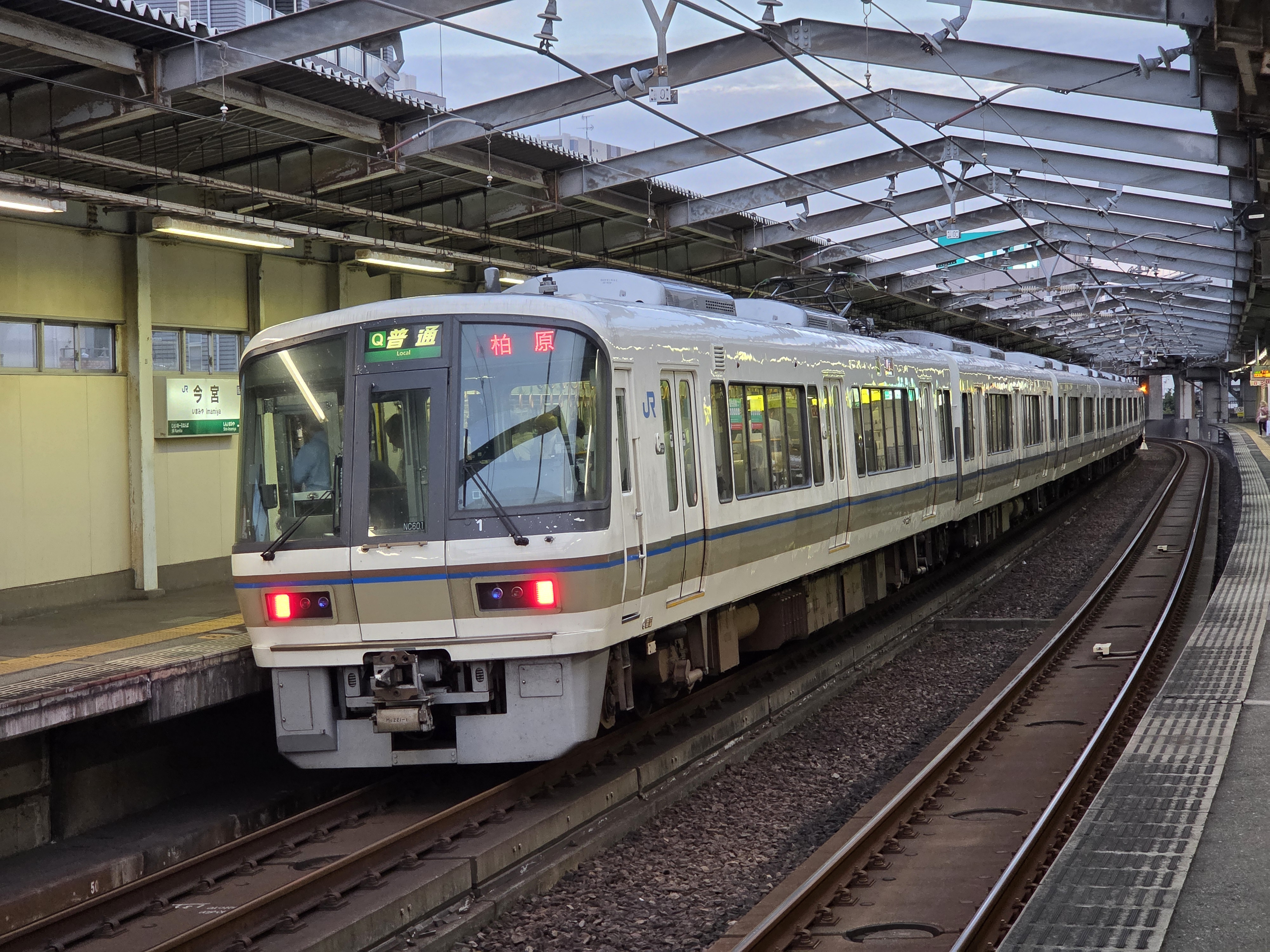
221 series at Imamiya Station, Oct 2025

== Lines ==
- West Japan Railway Company
  - Kansai Main Line (Yamatoji Line)
  - Osaka Loop Line

== Layout ==
- 2 platforms on the second level serve 3 tracks (Yamatoji Line tracks and Osaka Loop Line outer clockwise track), and a side platform on the third level a track (Osaka Loop Line inner counter-clockwise track).

2nd level

1	■ Yamatoji Line	from JR Namba for Tennoji, Oji, Nara and Takada (Local)
2	■ Yamatoji Line	to JR Namba
3	■ Osaka Loop Line	outer clockwise for Nishikujo and Osaka

3rd level

4	■ Osaka Loop Line	inner counter-clockwise for Shin-Imamiya, Tennoji and Tsuruhashi
4	■ Yamatoji Line	from Osaka for Tennoji, Oji, Nara and Takada (Regional Rapid Service)

== History ==
Station numbering was introduced in March 2018 with Imamiya being assigned station number JR-Q18 for the Yamatoji Line and JR-O18 for the Osaka Loop Line.

== Adjacent stations ==
«	Service	»
West Japan Railway Company (JR West)
Yamatoji Line
Shin-Imamiya	Local	JR Namba
Rapid Service: Does not stop at this station
Osaka Loop Line
Ashiharabashi	Local	Shin-Imamiya
Ashiharabashi	Regional Rapid	Shin-Imamiya
Ashiharabashi	Direct Rapid (Clockwise trains only)	Shin-Imamiya
Yamatoji Rapid: Does not stop at this station
Rapid: Does not stop at this station
Kansai Airport Rapid: Does not stop at this station
Kishuji Rapid: Does not stop at this station
Limited Express Kuroshio: Does not stop at this station
Limited Express Haruka: Does not stop at this station
