= Kishinosato-Tamade Station =

Railway station in Osaka, Japan

Kishinosato-Tamade Station 岸里玉出駅
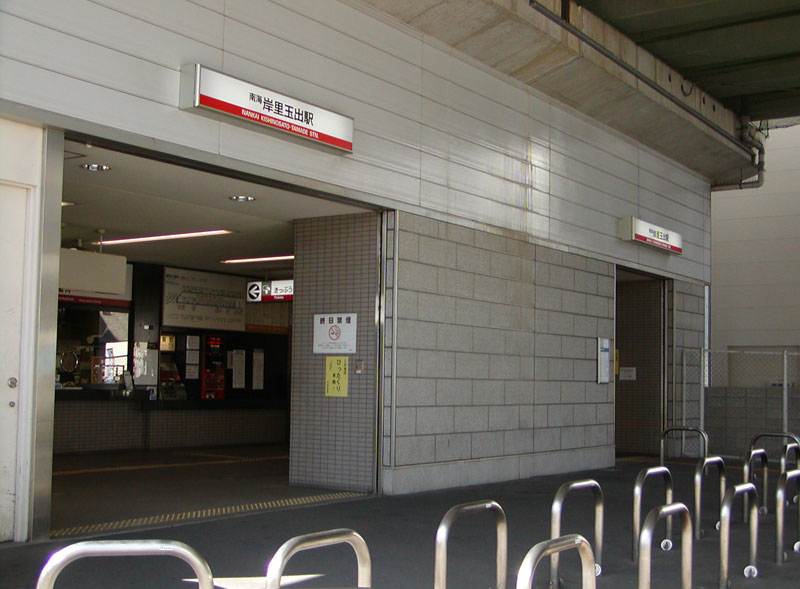
- Kishinosato-Tamade Station entrance in March 2007

General information
- Location: 1-1-17, Tamade-higashi, Nishinari-ku, Osaka （大阪府大阪市西成区玉出東1丁目1番17号） Osaka Prefecture; Japan
- Coordinates: 34°37′45.1″N 135°29′40.7″E
- Operator: Nankai Electric Railway
- Lines: Nankai Main Line; Koya Line
- Platforms: 1 island platform, 3 side platforms

Construction
- Structure type: Elevated

Other information
- Station code: NK06
- Website: Official website

History
- Opened: Kishinosato: July 1913; 113 years ago Tamagi: October 1908; 117 years ago Kishinosato-Tamade: April 1993; 33 years ago
- Closed: Kishinosato: 1993; 33 years ago Tamagi: 1993; 33 years ago
- Former names: Kishinosato, Tamagi (until 1993)

Passengers
- 6,860 daily

Services
Preceding station	Nankai Electric Railway	Following station
Tengachaya NK05 towards Namba	Nankai Main Line Local	Kohama NK07 towards Wakayamashi
Tengachaya NK05 towards Namba	Kōya Line Local	Tezukayama NK51 towards Gokurakubashi
Nishi-Tengachaya NK06-1 towards Shiomibashi	Kōya Line Shiomibashi Line	Terminus
Location
- Location within Japan

Kishinosato-Tamade Station (岸里玉出駅, Kishinosato-Tamade-eki) is a railway station in Nishinari-ku, Osaka, Osaka Prefecture, Japan, operated by the private railway operator Nankai Electric Railway.

== Lines ==
Kishinosato-Tamade Station is served by the Nankai Main Line as well as the Koya Line, and has the station number "NK06".

== Layout ==
The station is elevated and has five platforms serving five tracks in total. Two side platforms serve the Koya Line, and one side platform parallel to the Nankai Line serves the Koya Line (Shiomibashi Line). Two tracks of the Nankai Main Line are served by an island platform with a passing track for Namba outside of track 4.

=== Platforms ===
1	■ Koya Line	for Koyasan; Change trains to the Semboku Rapid Railway Line at Nakamozu for Izumi-Chuo
2	■ Koya Line	for Haginochaya, Imamiyaebisu and Namba
3	■ Nankai Line	for Wakayamashi and Kansai Airport
4	■ Nankai Line	for Namba (passing Haginochaya and Imamiyabisu)
6	■ Koya Line (Shiomibashi Line)	for Shiomibashi

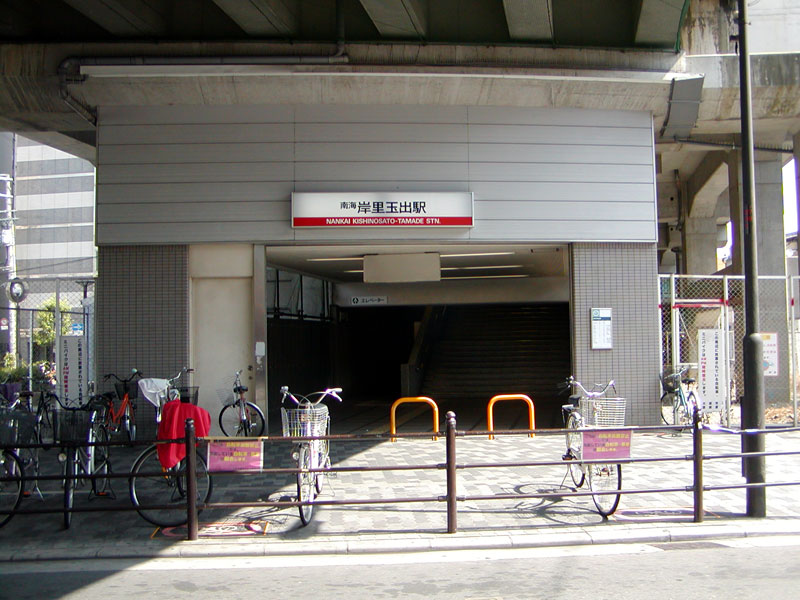
Tamade gate

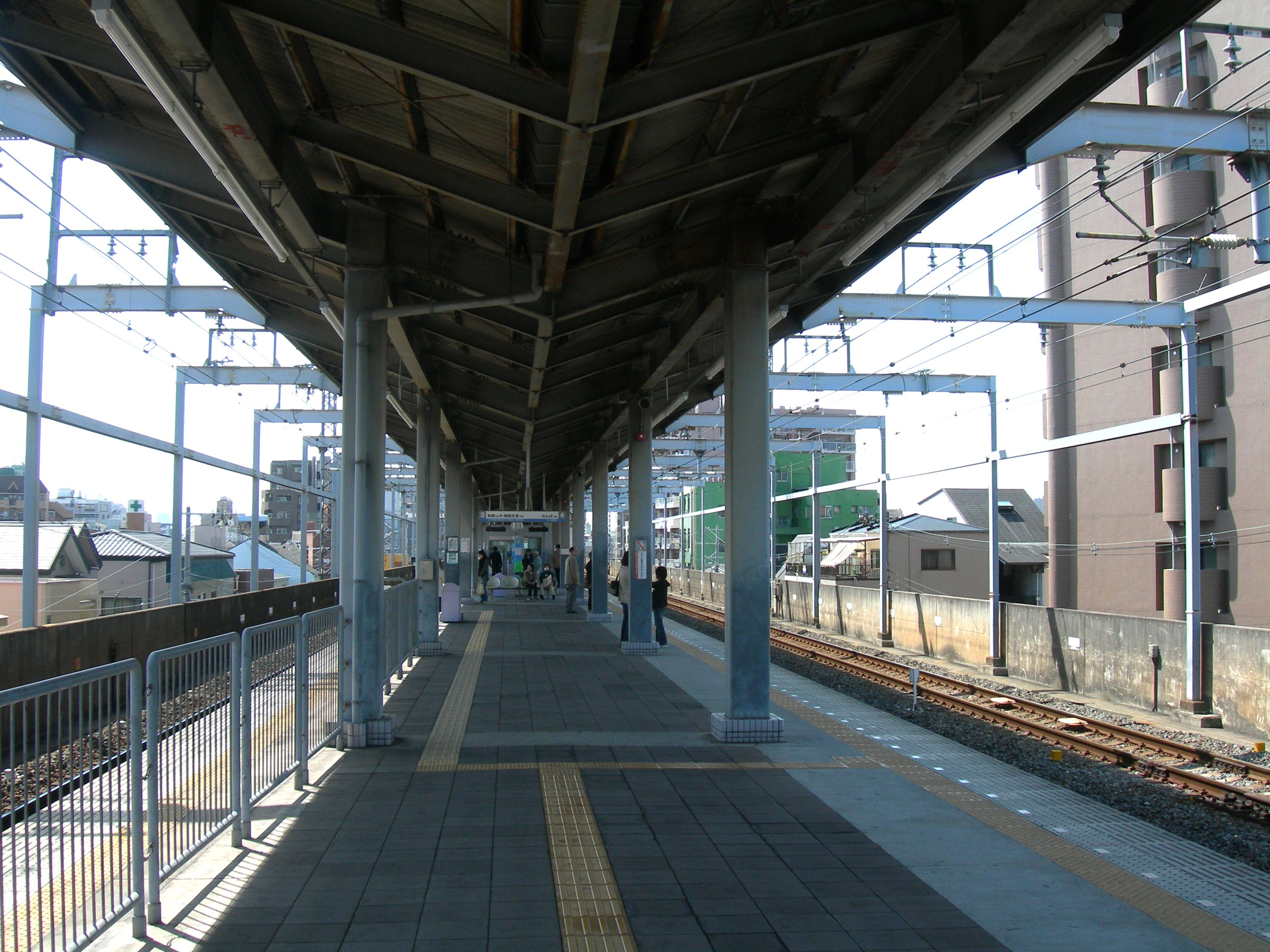
Platform of Nankai Main Line

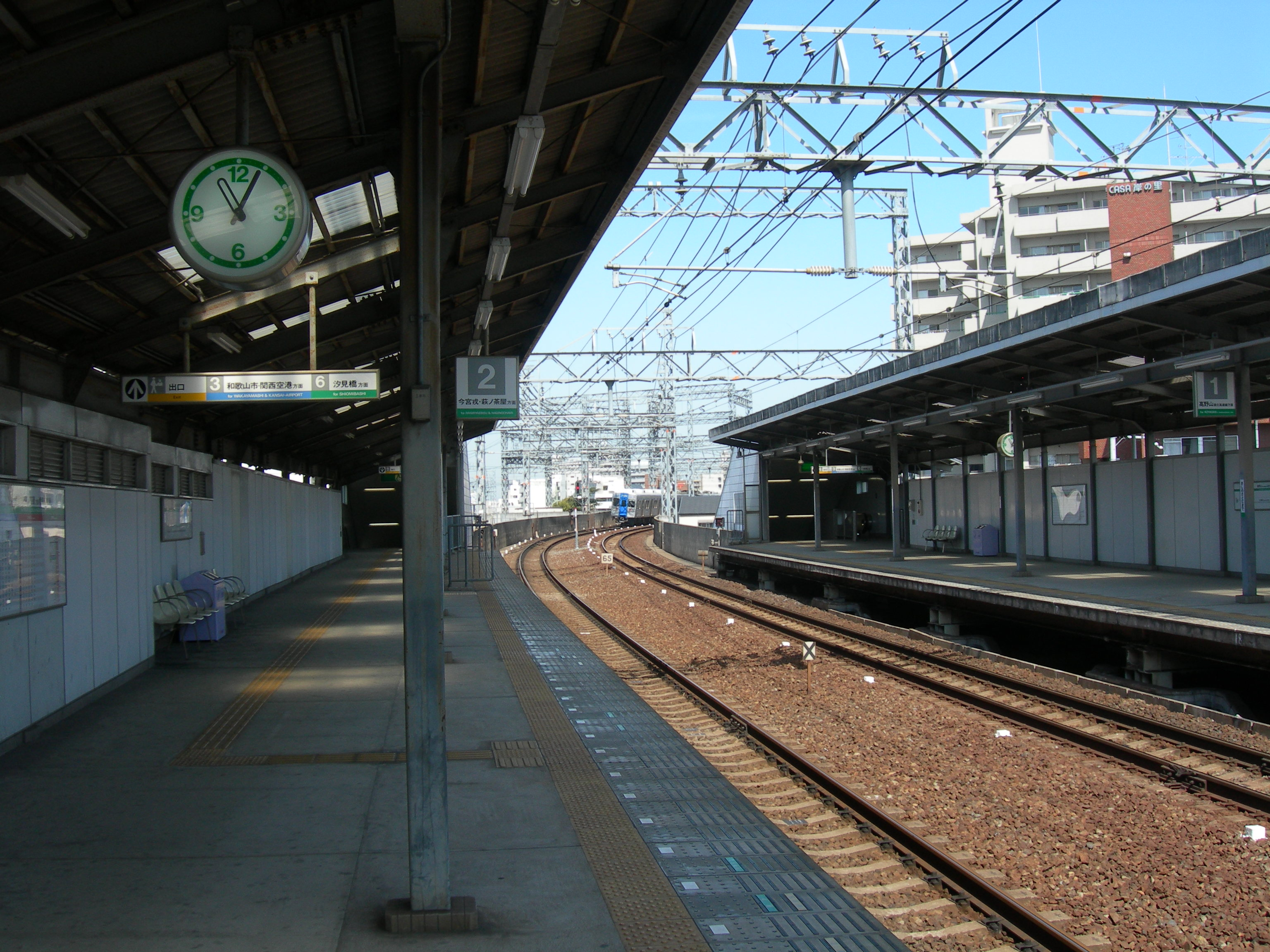
Platform of Kōya Line

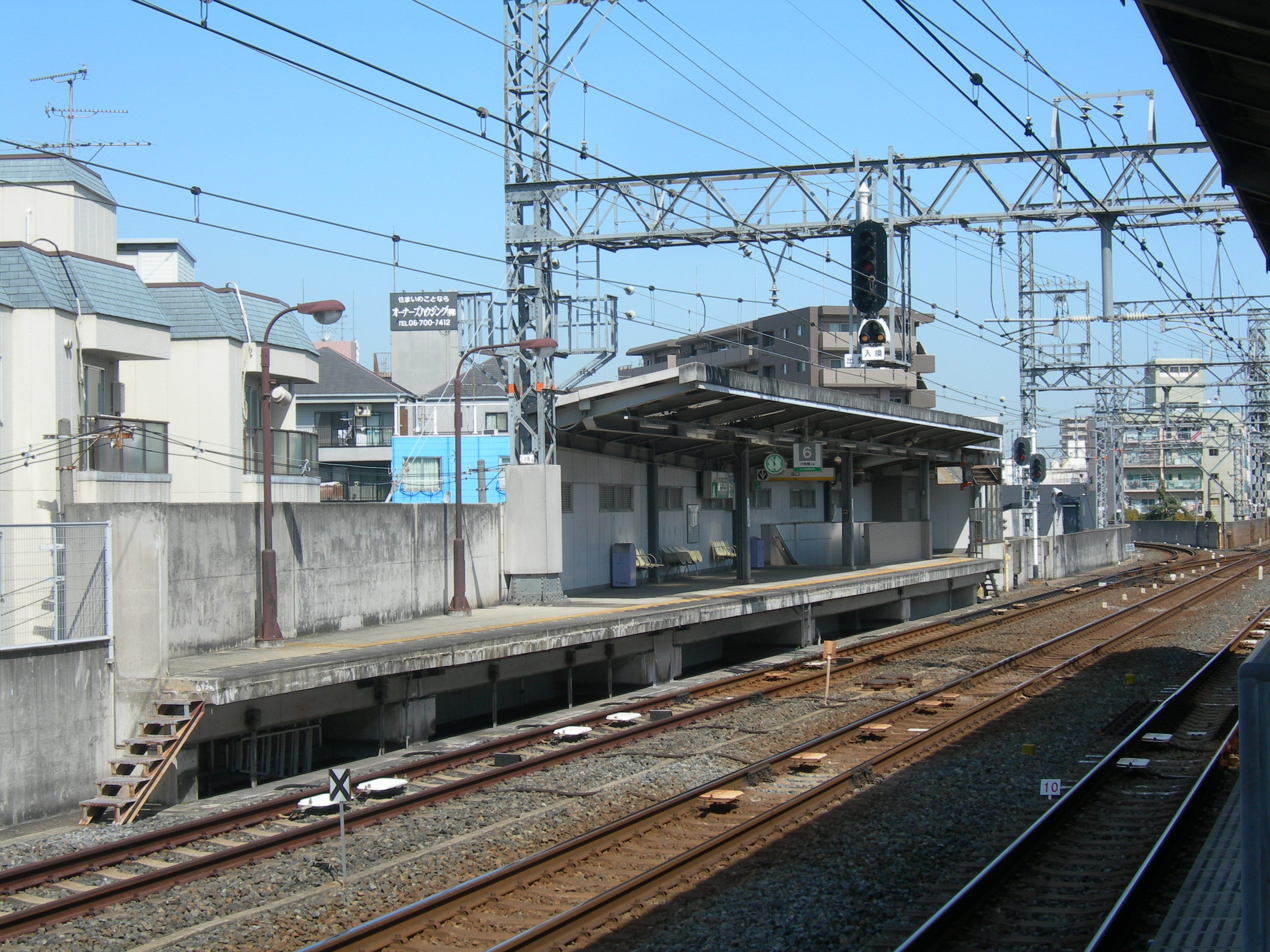
Platform of Shiomibashi Line

== History ==
Kishinosato-Tamade Station opened in April 1993 as a result of the merger of two former stations, namely Kishinosato Station and Tamagi Station.

== See also ==
- List of railway stations in Japan
