= Haginochaya Station =

Railway station in Osaka, Japan

Haginochaya Station 萩ノ茶屋駅
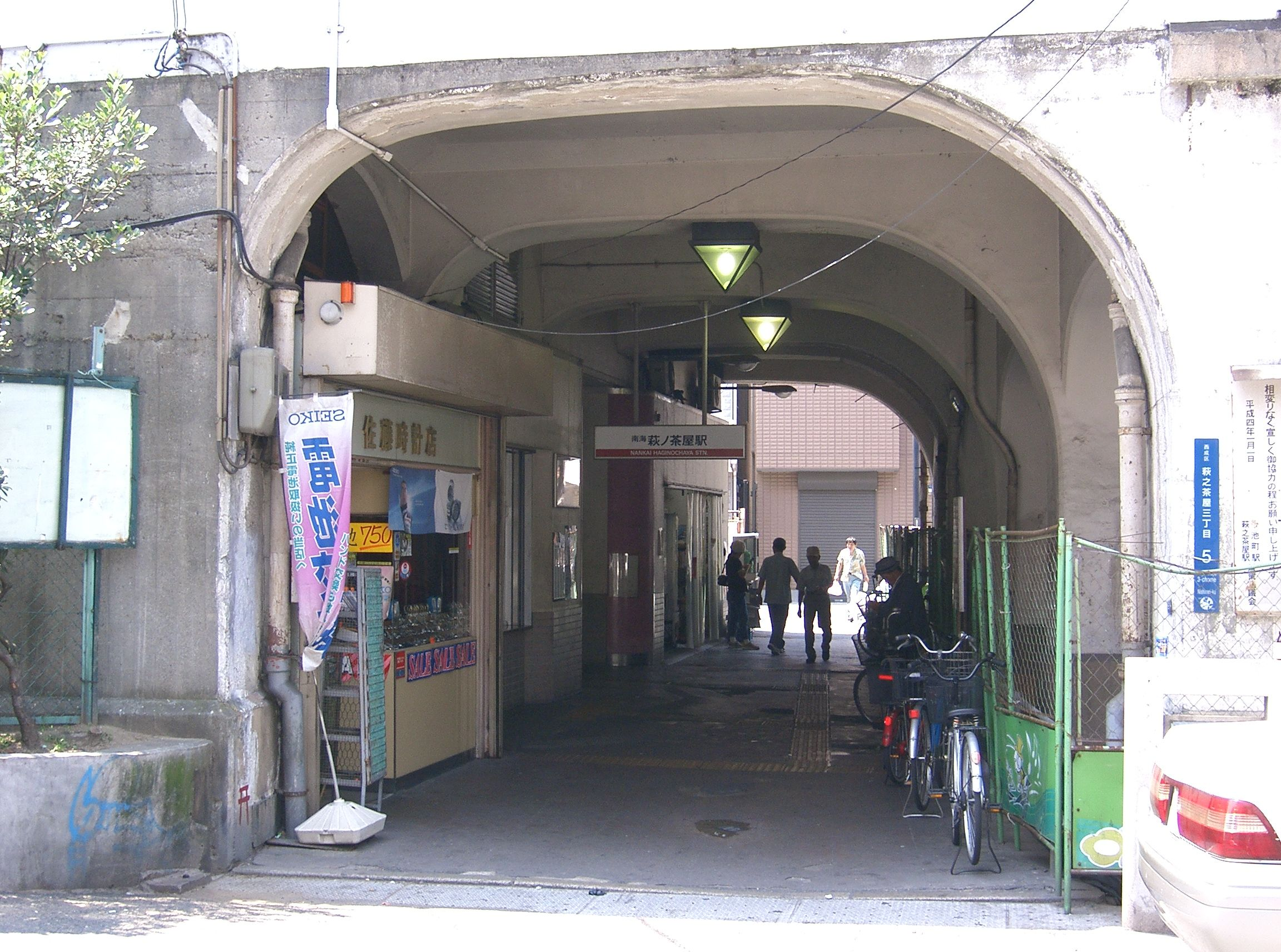

General information
- Location: 3-5-38, Haghinochaya, Nishinari, Osaka, Osaka （大阪府大阪市西成区萩之茶屋三丁目5番38号） Japan
- Coordinates: 34°38′44.7″N 135°29′56.8″E
- Operator: Nankai Electric Railway
- Line: Kōya Line
- Platforms: 2 (1 island platform)
- Connections

Construction
- Structure type: Elevated

Other information
- Station code: NK04

History
- Opened: December 1907

Passengers
- 2,066 daily
Location

Haginochaya Station (萩ノ茶屋駅, Haginochaya-eki) is a railway station operated by Nankai Electric Railway Co., Ltd. in Nishinari-ku, Osaka, Osaka Prefecture, Japan.

== Line ==
- Nankai Electric Railway (NK04)
  - Kōya Line

== Layout ==
Haginochaya is an elevated station with one island platform serving the two easternmost tracks of the four-track right-of-way. Strictly speaking, it belongs to the Nankai Main Line, but only local Koya Line trains stop here.

1	■ Koya Line	for Koyasan (Change to the Nankai Line at Tengachaya for Wakayamashi and Kansai Airport)
2	■ Koya Line	for Namba

== Adjacent stations ==
«	Service	»
Nankai Electric Railway (NK04)
Nankai Main Line
All trains: Does not stop at this station
Koya Line
Shin-Imamiya (NK03)	Local	Tengachaya (NK05)
Semi-Express: Does not stop at this station
Sub Express: Does not stop at this station
Express: Does not stop at this station
Rapid Express: Does not stop at this station
Limited Express ("Koya", "Rinkan", "Semboku Liner"): Does not stop at this station
