= Imamiyaebisu Station =

Railway station in Osaka, Japan

Imamiyaebisu Station 今宮戎駅
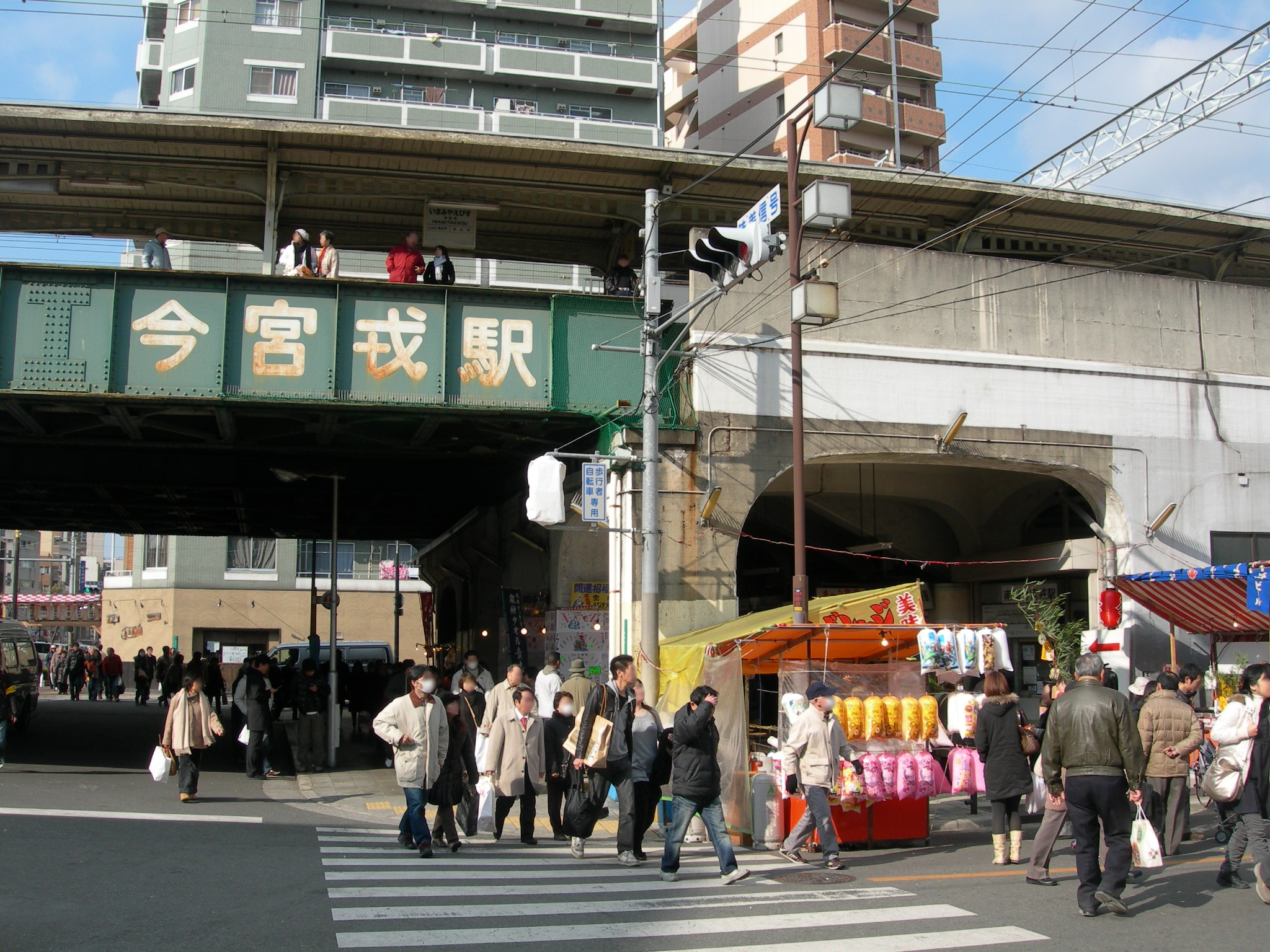
- Imamiyaebisu Station in January 2010

General information
- Location: 3-2-11 Shikitsu-Higashi, Naniwa, Osaka （大阪市浪速区敷津東三丁目2番11号） Osaka Prefecture; Japan
- Coordinates: 34°39′18″N 135°30′06″E
- Operator: Nankai Electric Railway
- Line: Kōya Line
- Platforms: 1 island platform
- Connections: Bus stop

Construction
- Structure type: Elevated

Other information
- Station code: NK02
- Website: Official website

History
- Opened: October 1907

Passengers
- FY 2004: 5,423 daily

Services
Preceding station	Nankai Electric Railway	Following station
Namba NK01 Terminus	Kōya Line Local	Shin-Imamiya NK03 towards Gokurakubashi
Location
- Location within Japan

Imamiyaebisu Station (今宮戎駅, Imamiyaebisu-eki) is a railway station on the Nankai Kōya Line in Naniwa-ku, Osaka, Osaka Prefecture, Japan, operated by the private railway operator Nankai Electric Railway.

== Line ==
Imamiyaebisu Station is served by the Nankai Kōya Line. It is designated "NK02".

== Layout ==
Imamiyaebisu is an elevated station with one island platform serving the two easternmost tracks of the four-track right-of-way. Strictly speaking, it belongs to the Nankai Main Line, but only local Koya Line trains stop at this station.

=== Platforms ===
1	■ Nankai Koya Line	for Koyasan
2	■ Nankai Koya Line	for Namba

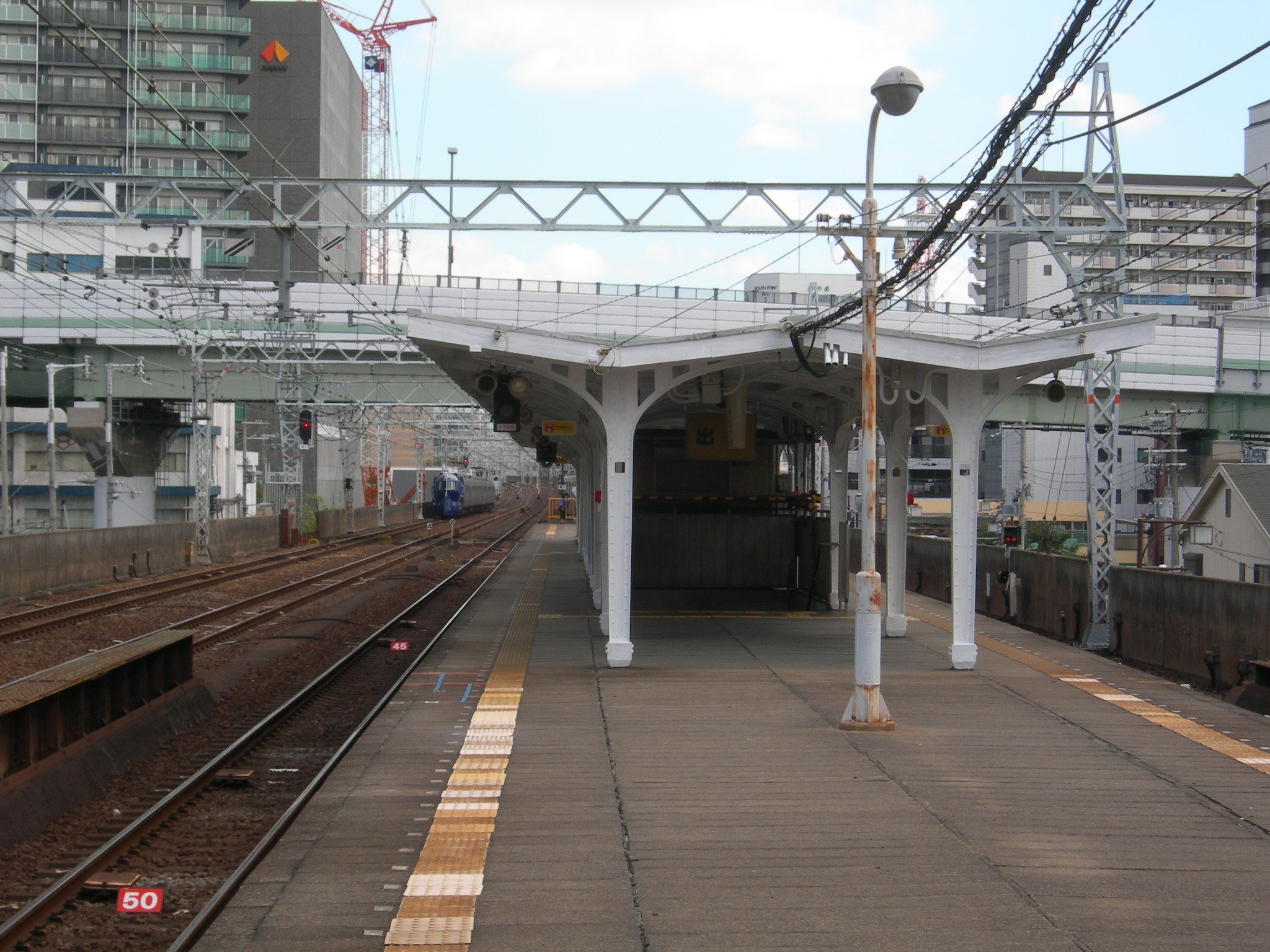
Imamiyaebisu Station platform in August 2012

== Surroundings ==
- Imamiya Ebisu Shrine
- Kubota Head office
- Osaka Municipal Subway Daikokuchō Station
- Osaka Municipal Subway and Hankai Tramway Hankai Line Ebisuchō Station
- National Route 25
- Shinsekai
- Tsūtenkaku
- Denden Town

== See also ==
- List of railway stations in Japan
