= Namba =

District of Osaka, Japan

- Chōme
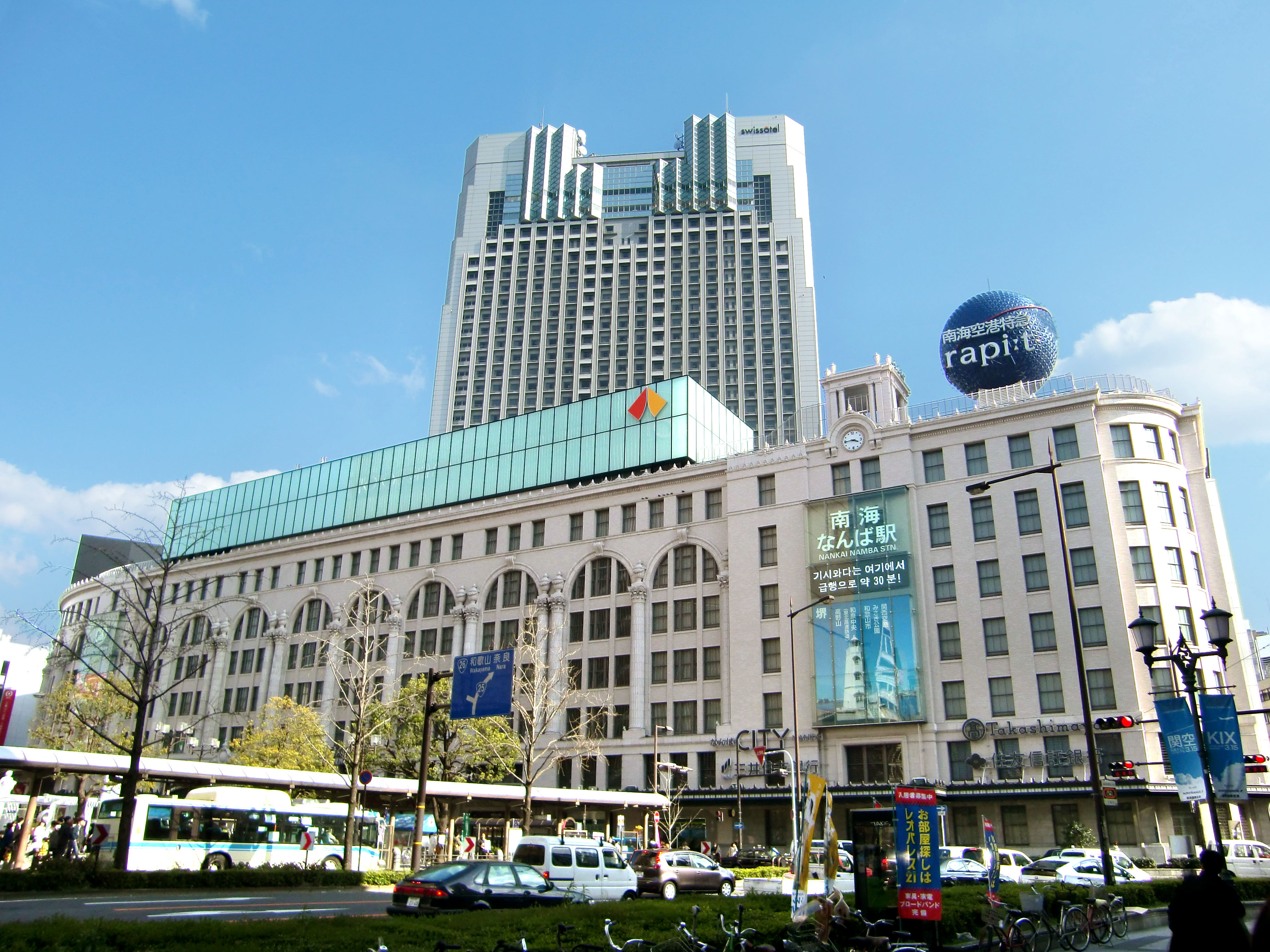
- Nankai Namba Station & Takashimaya Osaka Department Store

- Location within Osaka Prefecture Location within Japan
- Coordinates: 34°39′57″N 135°39′04″E
- Country: Japan
- Prefecture: Osaka
- City: Osaka
- Ward: Chūō and Naniwa

Namba (Japanese: 難波, IPA: [namba]) is a district in Chūō and Naniwa wards of Osaka, Japan. It is regarded as the center of Osaka's Minami (ja:ミナミ, "South") region. Its name came from a variation of Naniwa, the former name of Osaka. Namba hosts some of the city's main south-central railway terminals, as JR, Kintetsu, Nankai, Hanshin, and three Osaka Metro subway lines all have stations within this region.

== Railway stations ==
Namba Station
●Nankai Electric Railway

●Nankai Line
●Koya Line

Osaka Metro

●Midōsuji Line (M20)
●Yotsubashi Line (Y15)
●Sennichimae Line (S16)

JR Namba Station
●JR West

●Kansai Main Line (Yamatoji Line)

Ōsaka Namba Station
●Kintetsu

Namba Line (through service to the Nara Line)

●Hanshin Railway

●Hanshin Namba Line
