= Shin-Imamiya Station =

Major railway station in Osaka, Japan

Shin-Imamiya Station 新今宮駅
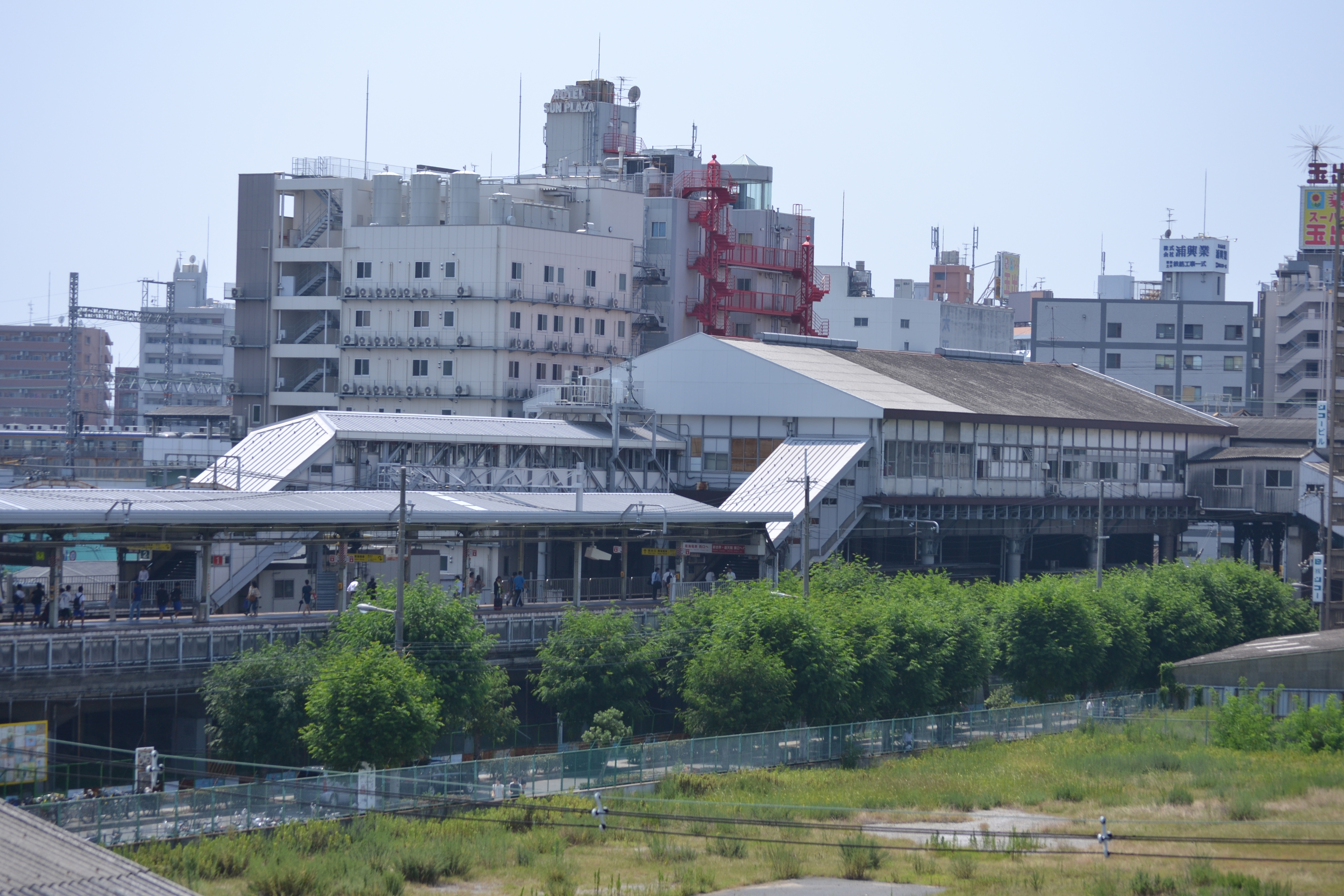

General information
- Location: Osaka; Japan
- Operator: JR West; Nankai Electric Railway; Hankai Tramway (Shin-Imamiya-Ekimae Station)
- Connections: Osaka Metro (via transfer at Dobutsuen-mae): Midosuji Line; Sakaisuji Line
Location
- Location within Japan

Shin-Imamiya Station (新今宮駅, Shin-Imamiya-eki) is a major railway station operated by West Japan Railway Company (JR West) and Nankai Electric Railway. Shin-Imamiya-Ekimae Station (新今宮駅前停留場, Shin-Imamiya-Ekimae-teiryūjō) is a stop on the Hankai Tramway Hankai Line.

This station is located near Dobutsuen-mae on the Midosuji and Sakaisuji lines of the Osaka Metro, but no physical connection exists between the two stations.

== Lines ==
Shin-Imamiya Station
- West Japan Railway Company (JR West)
  - Osaka Loop Line
  - Kansai Main Line (Yamatoji Line)
- Nankai Electric Railway (NK03)
  - Nankai Main Line
  - Koya Line
Shin-Imamiya-Ekimae Station
- Hankai Tramway Hankai Line (HN52)
Dobutsuen-mae Station
- Osaka Metro
  - Midosuji Line (M22)
  - Sakaisuji Line (K19)

== JR West Shin-Imamiya Station ==
Shin-Imamiya Station 新今宮駅
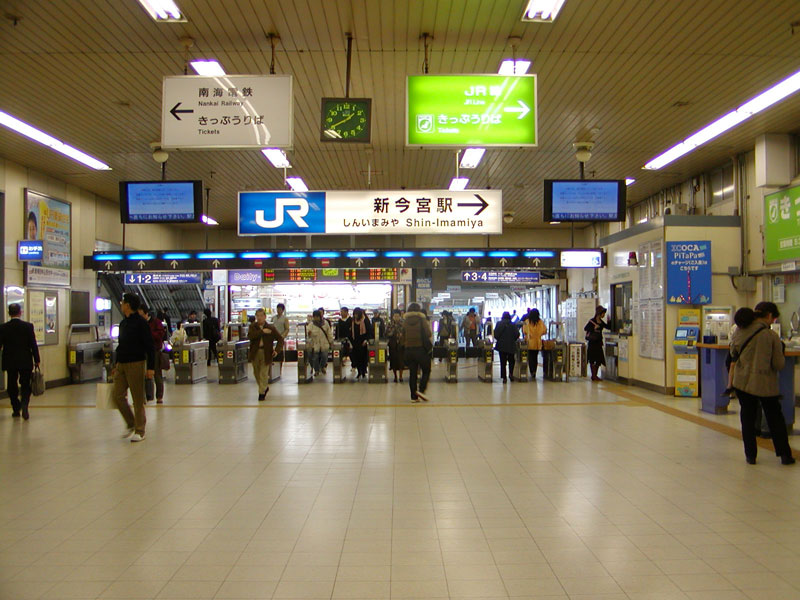
- JR West Shin-Imamiya Station in 2008

General information
- Location: 3-17-1, Ebisu-nishi, Naniwa-ku, Osaka; Japan
- Coordinates: 34°39′0.6″N 135°30′2.5″E
- System: JR West
- Operator: JR West
- Lines: Osaka Loop Line; Kansai Main Line (Yamatoji Line)
- Platforms: 2 island platforms
- Tracks: 4

Other information
- Station code: JR-O19 (Osaka Loop Line); JR-Q19 (Yamatoji Line)

History
- Opened: 1964; 62 years ago
Location

=== Layout ===
- Two island platforms serving four tracks.

1	■ Osaka Loop Line	counterclockwise local trains for Tennoji and Tsuruhashi
2	■ Yamatoji Line	for Oji, Nara and Takada
2	■ through to the Kansai Airport Line	airport rapid services for Kansai Airport
2	■ through to the Hanwa Line	rapid services for Otori and Wakayama
3	■ Yamatoji Line	for Imamiya and JR Namba
3	■ Osaka Loop Line	for Bentencho, Nishikujo and Osaka (mainly from the Hanwa Line)
4	■ Osaka Loop Line	clockwise trains for Bentencho, Nishikujo and Osaka (from Tsuruhashi and the Yamatoji Line)

- The Osaka Loop Line clockwise trains depart from the following tracks.
  - Local trains from Tsuruhashi: all from Track 4
  - Through trains from the Yamatoji Line: mainly from Track 4
  - Through trains from the Hanwa Line: mainly from Track 3 (Direct rapid services from Track 4)

=== Adjacent stations ===
«	Service	»
Osaka Loop Line (Including through trains arriving at and departing from Osaka to and from the Hanwa Line and the Yamatoji Line)
Limited Express Kuroshio: Does not stop at this station
Kansai Airport Limited Express Haruka: Does not stop at this station
Imamiya	Local	Tennoji
Imamiya	Regional Rapid	Tennoji
Imamiya	Direct Rapid	Tennoji
Taishō	Yamatoji Rapid	Tennoji
Taishō	Rapid	Tennoji
Taishō	Kansai Airport Rapid	Tennoji
Taishō	Kishuji Rapid	Tennoji
Yamatoji Line
Imamiya	Local	Tennoji
JR Namba	Rapid	Tennoji

=== History ===
Station numbering was introduced in March 2018 with Shin-Imamiya being assigned station number JR-Q19 for the Yamatoji Line and JR-O19 for the Osaka Loop Line.

== Nankai Railway Shin-Imamiya Station ==
Shin-Imamiya Station 新今宮駅
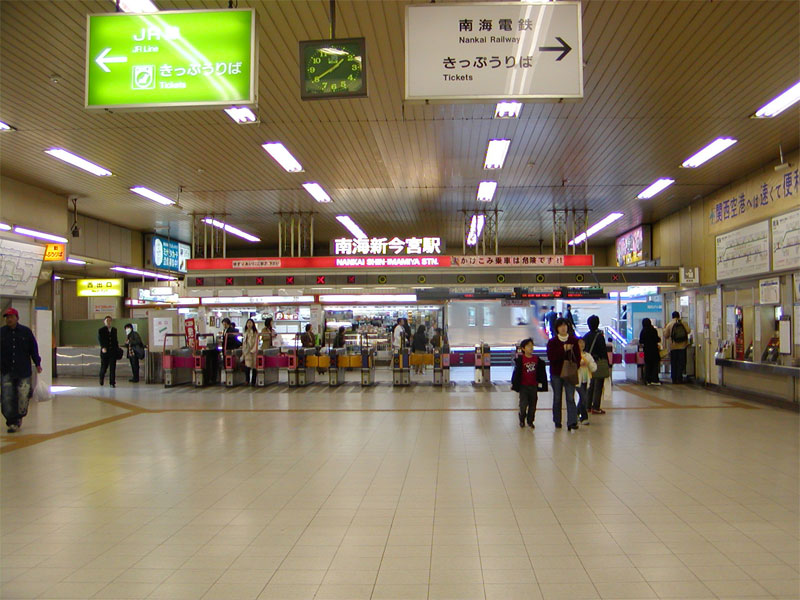
- Fourth floor ticket gates

General information
- Location: 1-2-24 Haginochaya, Nishinari-ku, Osaka; Japan
- Coordinates: 34°39′0.75″N 135°30′0.93″E
- System: Nankai Railway
- Operator: Nankai Electric Railway
- Lines: Nankai Main Line; Nankai Koya Line
- Platforms: 4 (1 island platform and 2 side platforms)
- Tracks: 4

Other information
- Station code: NK03

History
- Opened: December 1966; 59 years ago
Location

=== Layout ===
One island platform and two side platforms serving four tracks.

1	■ Koya Line	for Koyasan (■Semboku Rapid Railway) for Izumi-Chūō (Local trains stop at Haginochaya)
2	■ Koya Line	for Imamiyaebisu and Namba (Local trains stop at Imamiyaebisu)
3	■ Nankai Line	for Wakayamashi (■Airport Line) for Kansai Airport (passing Haginochaya)
4	■ Nankai Line	to Namba (passing Imamiyaebisu)

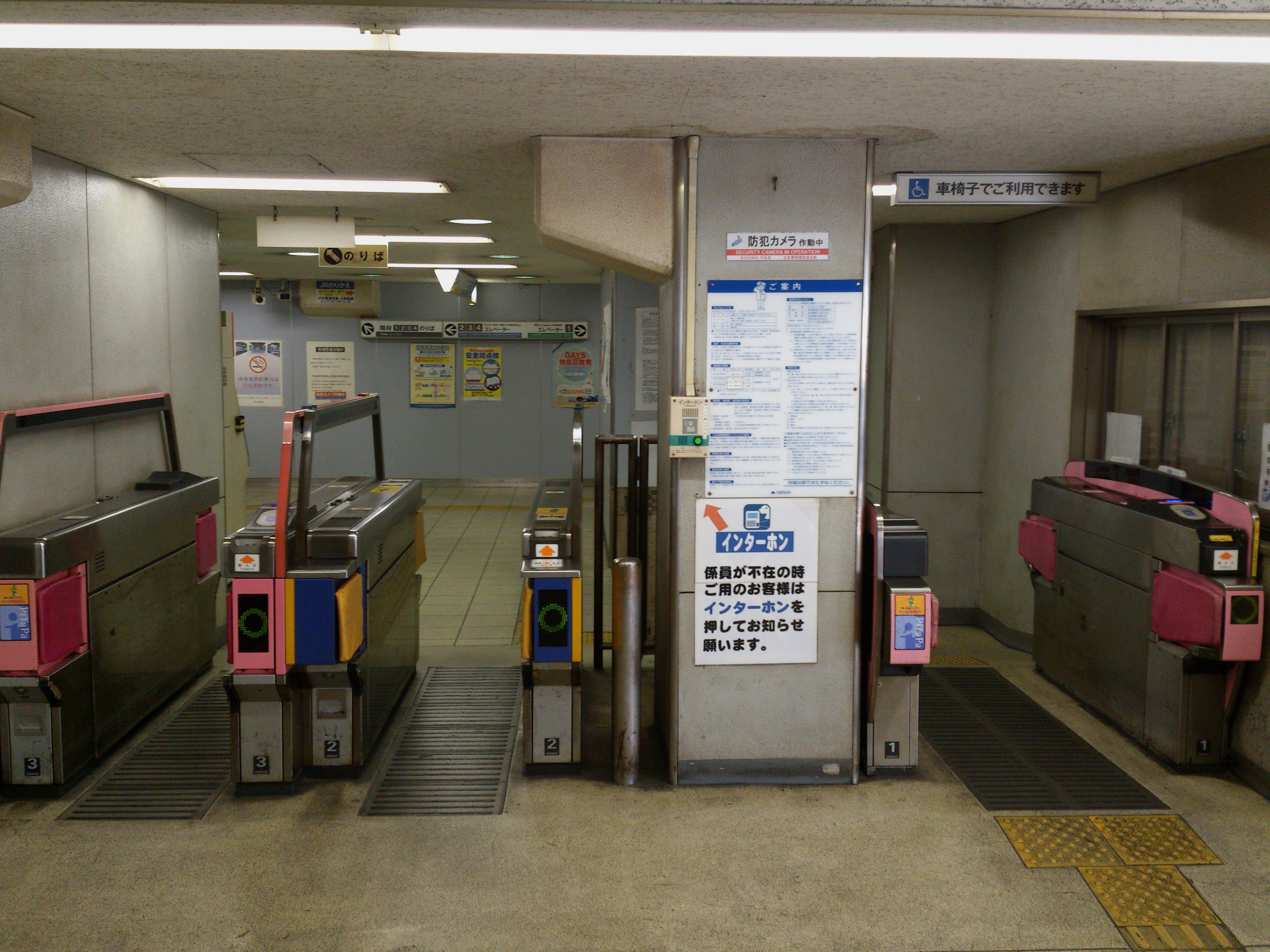
Second floor ticket gates

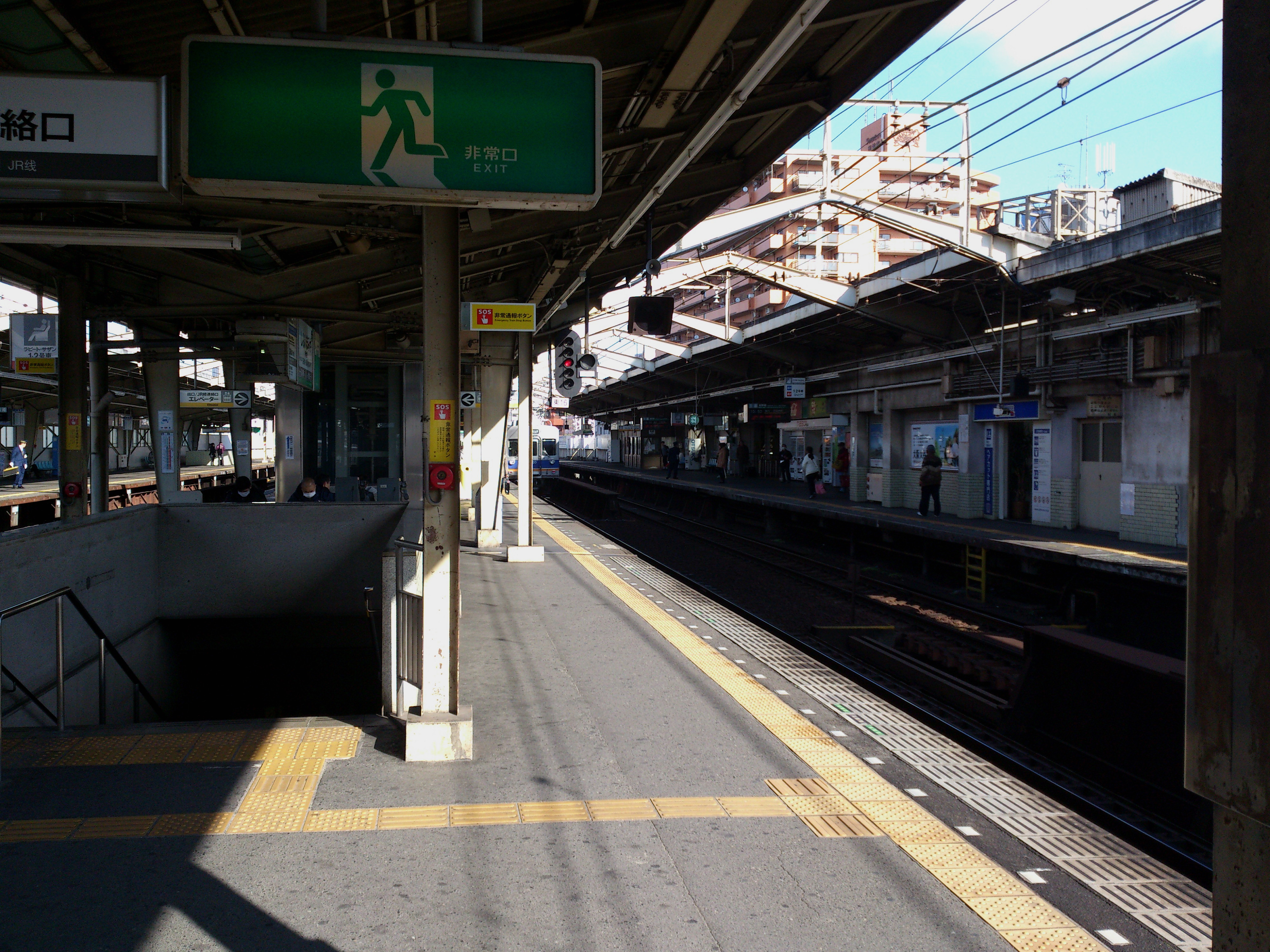
Platform of Koya Line

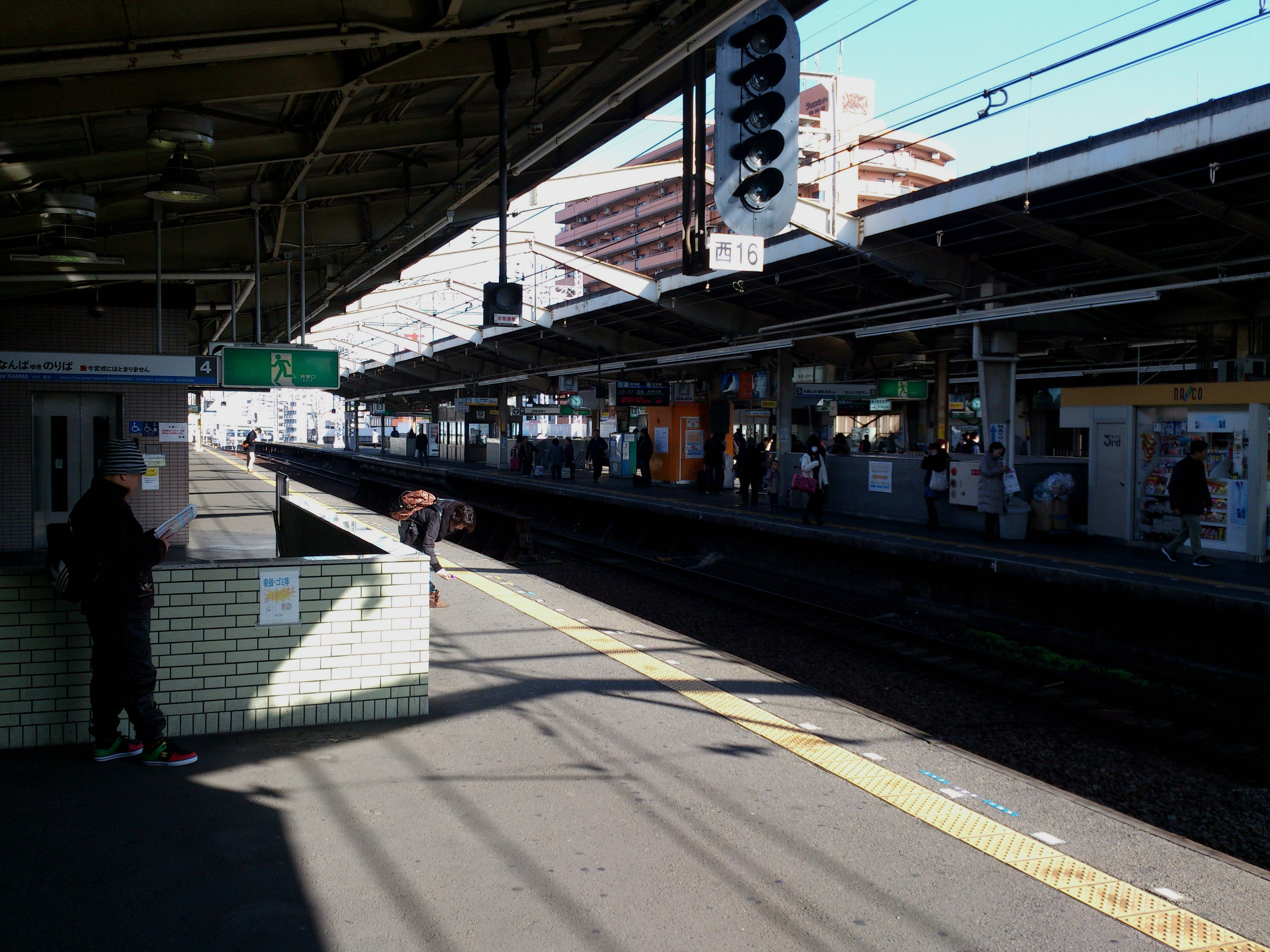
Platform of Nankai Line

=== Adjacent stations ===
«	Service	»
Nankai Main Line (NK03) (No trains stop at Imamiyaebisu and Haginochaya.)
Namba (NK01)	Local	Tengachaya (NK05)
Namba (NK01)	Semi-Express (only running for Namba in the morning)	Tengachaya (NK05)
Namba (NK01)	Sub. Express	Tengachaya (NK05)
Namba (NK01)	Airport Express	Tengachaya (NK05)
Namba (NK01)	Express	Tengachaya (NK05)
Namba (NK01)	Limited Express ("Rapi:t", "Southern")	Tengachaya (NK05)
Koya Line (NK03)
Imamiyaebisu (NK02)	Local	Haginochaya (NK04)
Namba (NK01)	Semi-Express	Tengachaya (NK05)
Namba (NK01)	Sub. Express	Tengachaya (NK05)
Namba (NK01)	Express	Tengachaya (NK05)
Namba (NK01)	Rapid Express	Tengachaya (NK05)
Namba (NK01)	Limited Express ("Koya", "Rinkan", "Semboku Liner")	Tengachaya (NK05)

== Hankai Tramway Shin-Imamiya-Ekimae Station ==
Shin-Imamiya-Ekimae Station 新今宮駅前駅
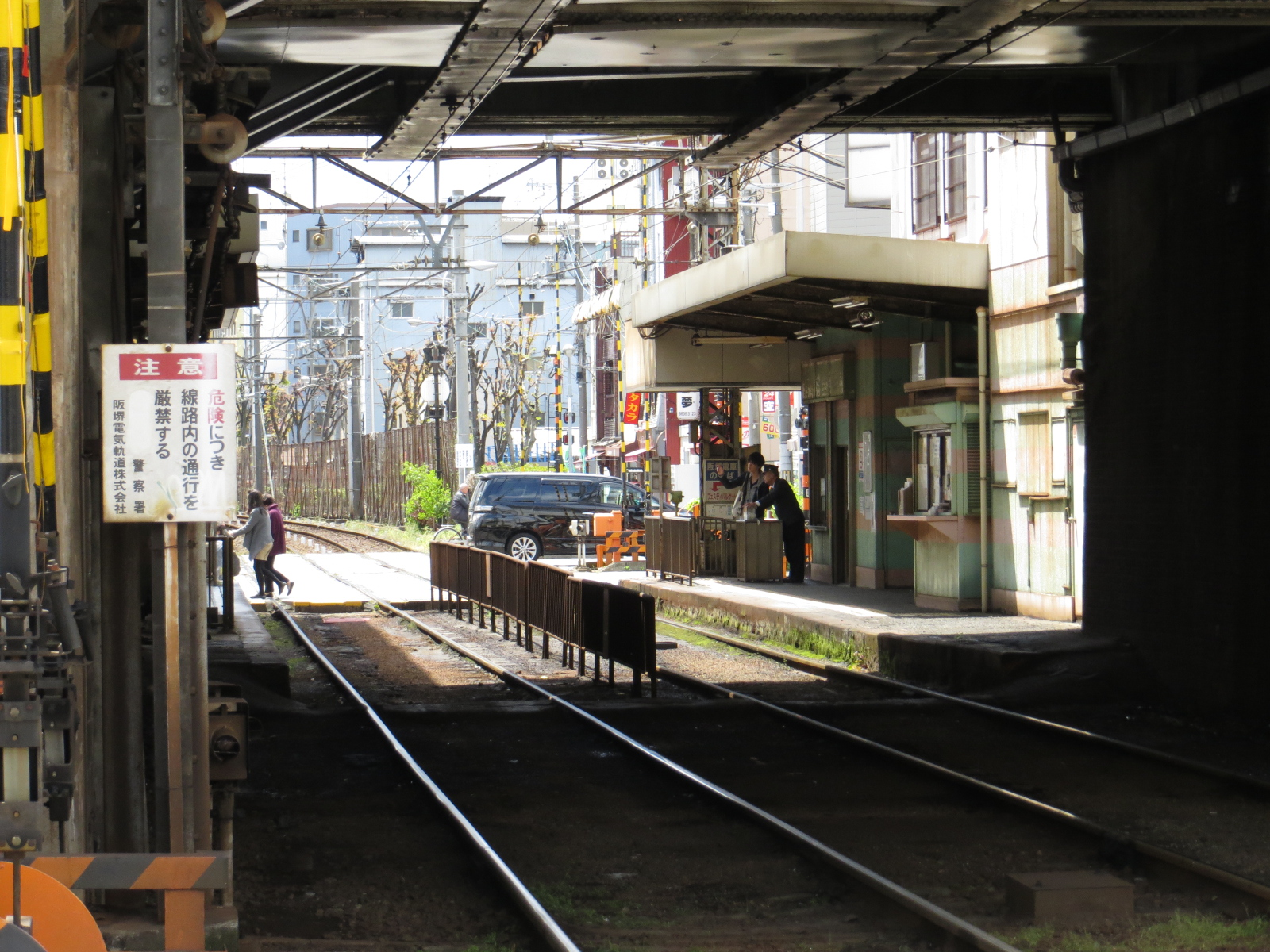
- Minami-Kasumichō Station (HN52), Hankai Line, Nishinari-ku, Osaka

General information
- Location: 1 Haginochaya, Nishinari-ku, Osaka; Japan
- Coordinates: 34°38′57.57″N 135°30′11.55″E
- System: Hankai Tramway
- Operator: Hankai Tramway
- Line: Hankai Line
- Platforms: 2 side platforms
- Tracks: 2

Other information
- Station code: HN52

History
- Opened: 1911; 115 years ago
- Former names: Minami-Kasumichō (until 2014)
Location

Shin-Imamiya-Ekimae Station was called Minami-Kasumichō Station (南霞町停留場, Minami-Kasumichō-teiryūjō) until the renaming on December 1, 2014.

=== Layout ===
The station has two side platforms serving a track each.

Southbound	■ Hankai Line	for Sumiyoshi and Abikomichi; Change trains at Abikomichi for Hamadera-eki-mae
Northbound	■ Hankai Line	to Ebisucho

=== Adjacent stations ===
«	Service	»
Hankai Line (HN52)
Ebisuchō (HN51)	-	Imaike (HN53)

== Surrounding area ==
- Shinsekai
  - Tsutenkaku
  - Jan Jan Yokocho
  - SpaWorld
- Imamiya-ebisu
- Tennoji Park, Tennoji Zoo
- Kamagasaki
  - Tobita Shinchi

== See also ==
- List of railway stations in Japan
