= Jarinko Chie (film) =

1981 Japanese animated film

- Theatrical poster

Japanese name
- Japanese: じゃりン子チエ
Transcriptions
- Revised Hepburn: Jarinko Chie
- Directed by: Isao Takahata
- Screenplay by: Isao Takahata; Noboru Shiroyama
- Based on: Jarinko Chie by Etsumi Haruki
- Produced by: Hidenori Taga; Tetsuo Katayama
- Starring: Chinatsu Nakayama; Norio Nishikawa; Gannosuke Ashiya; Kyoko Mitsubayashi
- Cinematography: Hirokata Takahashi
- Edited by: Kazuko Takahashi; Masatoshi Tsurubuchi
- Music by: Masaru Hoshi
- Production company: Tokyo Movie Shinsha
- Distributed by: Toho
- Release date: 11 April 1981
- Running time: 110 minutes
- Country: Japan
- Language: Japanese

Jarinko Chie (Japanese: じゃりン子チエ; lit. 'Chie the Brat'), also known as Downtown Story, is a 1981 Japanese animated film directed by Isao Takahata. Based on the 1978 seinen manga by Etsumi Haruki, the film was co-written by Takahata and Noboru Shiroyama, it stars the voices of Chinatsu Nakayama, Norio Nishikawa, Kiyoshi Nishikawa, Kyoko Mitsubayashi, and Gannosuke Ashiya. Taking place in a working class town in Osaka, the young and independent Chie navigates the adult world around her, seeking to reform her father's behaviour and keep her family together.

Produced and animated by Tokyo Movie Shinsha, Jarinko Chie was Takahata's reintroduction to feature-length animated films after working in television anime. Production began in December 1980, with the animation style taking strong cues from the source material. Particular notice was taken to accurately portray the film's setting of Osaka, including research trips, the use of Kansai dialect, and the hiring of Osakan cast members. The film was released in Japan by Toho on 11 April 1981. Jarinko Chie saw moderate box office success and has been praised, particularly for its social consciousness and comedy. Analyses of the film have looked at the story as a commentary on masculinity and the role of community. After its success, Takahata served as the chief director for a follow-up TV series. Chie herself has remained a popular character in Osaka.

== Plot ==
Set in a working class district of Osaka, ten-year-old Chie is tasked with helping her troublesome, workshy father Tetsu run a local izakaya—an informal bar or pub. Whilst cooking, she sees a stray cat looking hungry. After deciding to feed it, the cat (named Kotetsu), enters the izakaya and begins living with her and Tetsu. Constantly in need of money, Tetsu lies to his father (Ojii) to get money from him, only for him to lose it gambling. Obaa admonishes her husband's willingness to lend money. After accusing the boss Shachou of cheating, Tetsu fights his way home. Ojii and Obaa come to the izakaya after closing time to scold Tetsu for his neglect of Chie.

Chie grows increasingly upset with Tetsu for always putting himself first. Despite trying to keep it a secret from him, Tetsu shows up to Chie's class unexpectedly during parent's visiting day and causes a scene by berating her teacher, Wataru Hanai. After school, Chie and Tetsu fight about his selfishness. Just as she is about to leave in anger, she notices a flower on the doorstep, recognising it as a sign from her mother Yoshie who has recently separated from Tetsu.

Looking forward to seeing her mother again, Chie leaves without telling Tetsu her plans. Both Chie and Yoshie want to reunite with Tetsu, but Chie recognises it is still too early for them to meet again as Tetsu has yet to change his attitude. That night, Shachou and his underlings come to the izakaya demanding Tetsu pay his debts to the gambling house. While drinking, Shachou encourages his beloved cat, Antonio to fight Chie's Kotetsu. To their shock, Antonio loses, with Kotetsu partially castrating him. Upset by Antonio's condition, Shachou leaves before Tetsu returns.

Chie spends her free time searching for work for her father, when she encounters Shachou, who has now turned his gambling house into an okonomiyaki restaurant upon the death of Antonio. Requiring a security guard, he decides to hire Tetsu. Later, Chie meets with her mother again when Tetsu spots them both. Upset at what he perceives as Chie's rejection, he spends the day sulking. During a home visit by her homeroom teacher, Wataru reveals that he is the son of Tetsu's former homeroom teacher Kankotsu, who also set up the marriage between Tetsu and Yoshie. The elder Hanai seeks to repair the relationship between Yoshie and Tetsu, the two tentatively agree and Yoshie moves in again. Despite an initially frosty relationship, after Chie starts acting up on the train, the two of them begin talking. During the course of the day at the amusement park their relationship rekindles.

One evening, Tetsu is at Shachou's okonomiyaki restaurant complaining about Kotetsu's violent tendencies when unexpectedly Antonio Jr. appears, seeking revenge against Kotetsu. Despite pleas, initially from a sober Shachou, and then Chie, for things to remain peaceful, Antonio Jr. demands a fight. Kotetsu attempts to defuse the situation by showing his respect for the dead and refuses to fight him, Antonio Jr. forgives Kotetsu and everyone goes home. The film ends with a montage of characters entering the izakaya.

== Cast ==
- Chinatsu Nakayama as Chie Takemoto
- Norio Nishikawa as Tetsu Takemoto, Chie's father
- Gannosuke Ashiya as Shachou (the yakuza boss)
- Kyoko Mitsubayashi as Yoshie, Chie's mother
- Kiyoshi Nishikawa as Kotetsu, the family cat
- Yasushi Yokoyama as Antonio and Antonio Jr., Shachou's cat and the cat's son
- Ichirō Nagai as Shocho
- Katsura Bunshi VI as Wataru Hanai, Chie's teacher
- Nikaku Shōfukutei as Kankotsu Hanai, Tetsu's former teacher
- Yoshio Kamigata as Maruyama Mitsuru
- Keisuke Ōtori as Ojii, Chie's grandfather
- Utako Kyō as Obaa, Chie's grandmother
- Shinsuke Shimada as Masaru, Chie's classmate
- Ryusuke Matsumoto as Shigeru, Chie's classmate
- Yoshiko Ōta as Masaru's mother

== Production ==
=== Development and pre-production ===
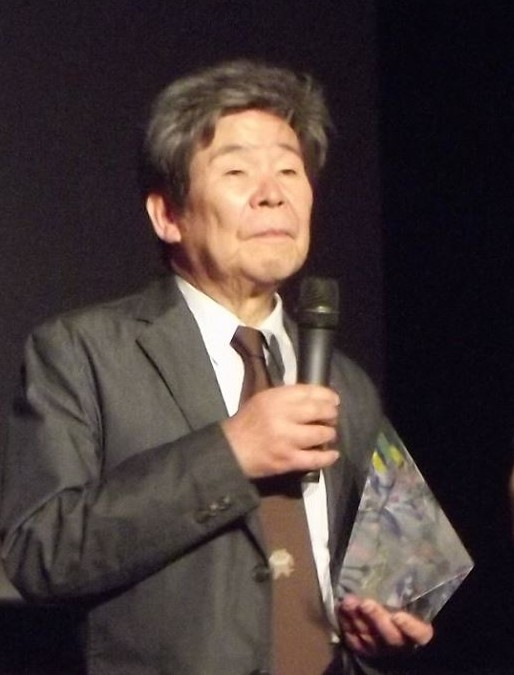
Director Isao Takahata in 2014.

Jarinko Chie was produced by Toho and animated by Tokyo Movie Shinsha. The film is based on the seinen manga by Etsumi Haruki. After finishing work on the production of the final episode of Anne of Green Gables, Takahata was approached by Yasuo Ōtsuka with the project of Chie from their boss Yutaka Fujioka. Ōtsuka, serving as the film's animation director, and character designer Yōichi Kotabe may have convinced Takahata to direct the film upon realising the manga's entertainment value. Takahata agreed to direct the film and decided that he wanted to balance the manga's story and comedic content with its depiction of the Osakan people and culture. After a research trip to Shinsekai—during which Takahata spent time copying Haruki's art style and reading his manga—he felt that the script's first draft, written by Fujimoto Giichi, was substandard. The final script is credited to Noboru Shiroyama, who wrote the script for the Furiten-kun theatrical film. The film faithfully adapts much of the manga's first few volumes.

Masaru Hoshi composed the music. Art director Nizo Yamamoto was working on the final episode of the Lupin the Third television series when he was asked to work on Jarinko Chie for the first time. Takahata was impressed by Makiko Futaki's work on The Castle of Cagliostro and employed her as an in-between animator for Jarinko Chie. Working on the film represented a shift for Takahata from working under an established studio (as he had done at Toei Animation) to making films independently. The author Jonathan Clements credits the production of Chie with the revitalisation of Takahata's career producing feature-length animation, and for once more allowing Takahata to collaborate with his former colleagues at Toei (who he would later form Studio Ghibli with).

=== Production and animation ===
Jarinko Chie started production in December 1980. The film intentionally copied the manga's artistic and tonal style by balancing realistic and impressionistic animation (e.g. the introduction of Kotetsu as a normal cat before showing him anthropomorphised). Care was taken to emphasise moments directly from the source material's manga panels. The animation used a deliberately stylised "uncool" look; Ōtsuka recalled being talked to by Takahata for drawing character poses that looked good, but artificial within the world of Haruki's manga. The production crew experienced some difficulty in drawing the cats in the film, due to their more human-like movements, while remaining faithful to Haruki's drawings. As a result of having a large interacting cast of characters, the number of cels drawn was larger than normal, with each frame averaging about five layers of cels. Yamamoto used thin, watercolour-like paints for the film's backgrounds and firm pen lines for shading, but the combination in certain scenes made inking night skies impossible. The production lasted only a few months, as a result, the style of the animation changed to be more solid as it was easier to animate than the manga's more sketched visuals.

This was the first film in ten years that Chie's voice actress Chinatsu Nakayama had been in. At the time, she was a sitting member of the legislature in Japan's House of Councillors. During her first meeting with Haruki, the artist revealed that he partially based Chie on Nakayama's character from the film Gametsui yatsu. The film's dubbing started on 7 February 1981 at Tohokushinsha Studio in Asakusa, with characters being recorded separately in Osaka, which began on 13 February. During the dubbing process, Gannosuke Ashiya's nearsightedness made it difficult for him to watch the screen to match his character's mouth movements. Commenting on the process, Takahata referred to the voice acting as "honest", but found that the pre-animated sequences limited the ability for experimentation. Due to the original manga's episodic narrative, Takahata had difficulty cutting material from the film during the editing process. The film's theme song "Chie" was performed by the band BG4.

=== Setting ===
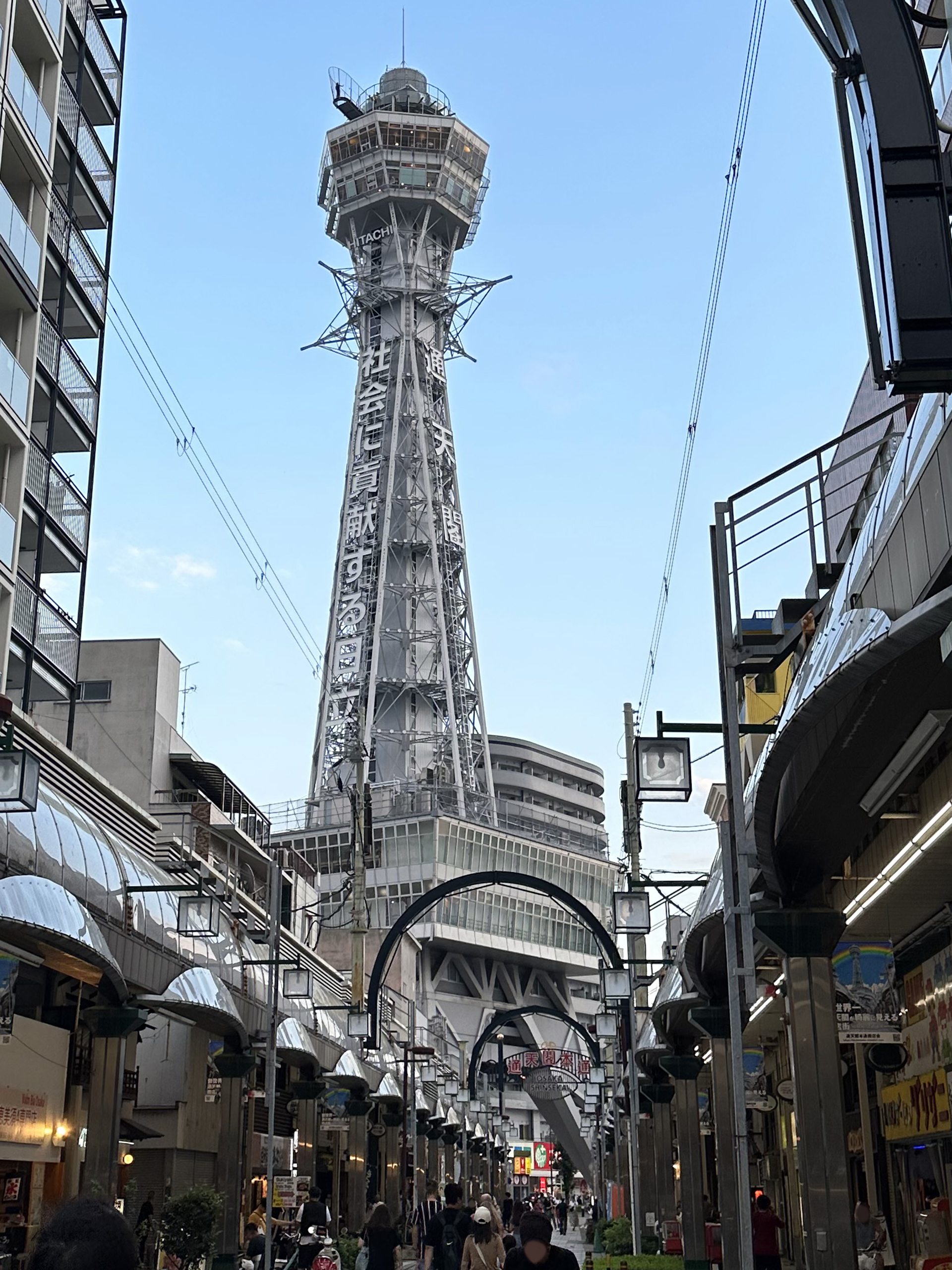
The Tsūtenkaku, prominent in the background of much of the film.

The story is based on an area in Osaka encompassing Shinsekai and Kamagasaki. This is a working class area on the border of Nishinari Ward. Takahata and Ōtsuka tried to ensure accuracy to the area of Osaka they were depicting, in order to do so, Takahata reportedly stayed overnight in a doss-house. The characters of the film speak using Osaka dialect, a way of speaking considered more casual and emotional by speakers of standard Japanese. Chie herself uses it more in proportion to her level of anger, using it less when she is with her mother.

Numerous references to regional culture are made in the film, for instance, Shachou's restaurant serves okonomiyaki which is considered a regional speciality, and Tetsu and Chie's izakaya is named Horumon (ホルモン), referring to offal, derived from Osakan dialect meaning 'to throw away'. Throughout the film, the Tsūtenkaku can be seen in the near-distance and Chie and her mother visit Tennōji Park together. The film also features many manzai comedians in its voice cast, a form of double-act comedy associated with Osaka and the Kansai region. At this time, manzai comedy was undergoing a boom in popularity on Japanese television. Clements attributes the popularity of manzai to the reason the film focusses on the city's culture.

== Release ==
Jarinko Chie was released on 11 April 1981, on the same day as the Furiten-kun theatrical film. For the manzai comedians playing characters in the film, this was their first role in animation. The television programme Kao Master Theatre TV promoted it with an animated sequence. During an interview to promote the film, Takahata was asked by Toshio Suzuki—then a journalist—how he could shift from "producing a classic like Heidi" to a film about "skid row" in Osaka. Suzuki would later become the president of Studio Ghibli, working with both Takahata and Hayao Miyazaki. During this period around the release of Jarinko Chie in 1981, Suzuki interviewed Takahata daily for Animage magazine, which cemented Takahata's reputation as someone important in the world of Japanese animation. Following the film's success, Takahata agreed to be the chief director for an animated television series, although he later left the production team.

The film was released in French cinemas on 9 February 2005, but has not received a wide distribution outside of Japan.

== Reception ==
Jarinko Chie achieved moderate success at the Japanese box office, but the film's popularity proved especially notable in the Kansai region. The film was praised by critics and audiences for being technically complex and containing subtextual nuance but received limited attention. Since the premiere of the film and television series, Chie has continued to remain a popular character in Osaka and the Kansai region more broadly. Writing at its release, academic and manga critic Tomohiko Murakami said of the film that it was steeped in pathos despite its funny moments, that the fluid role changes between adults and children allow the mediating role that Chie plays to be the source of both its comedy and sentiment. Writing in 1991 in anticipation of the release of Only Yesterday, film critic Tadao Satō referred to Jarinko Chie as his favourite of Takahata's films, emphasising that the film had beautifully captured a human expression that could only be replicated through his unique blend of entertainment and social consciousness, referring to Takahata himself as a "social activist".

British film and animation journalist Andrew Osmond contrasts the film's "ungainly" animation with its "careful life observation". He analyses the film as a commentary on masculinity, drawing attention to the parallel plotlines between the human and animal elements of the story, however concluding that it is neither especially funny nor engaging. Colin Odell and Michelle Le Blanc, in their writing on Takahata's filmography, refer to the film as a "comedy of dysfunction". They view the film as a story about community interactions and emphasise the redemptive power of food, noting how the yakuza boss—Shachou—and his underlings each open food stands, while Chie is left responsible for cooking meat at the family's izakaya. The author Helen McCarthy sees Jarinko Chie as embodying a magical realist element in its depiction of working class life. To her, the cats mirror the human world, commenting on the class and gender relationships in the story. Clements views the film as a commentary on the "erosion of traditional masculinity" in contemporary Japanese society, with many of the men having lost their authority, while Chie respects her mother over her father (despite her mother's imperfections and father's love for her). He notes that Chie alludes to herself as an orphan, and further sings "Quayside Mother", a song about waiting for missing people to return after the war, to express her relationship with Tetsu.
