= Billiken =

Charm doll popular in the early 20th century

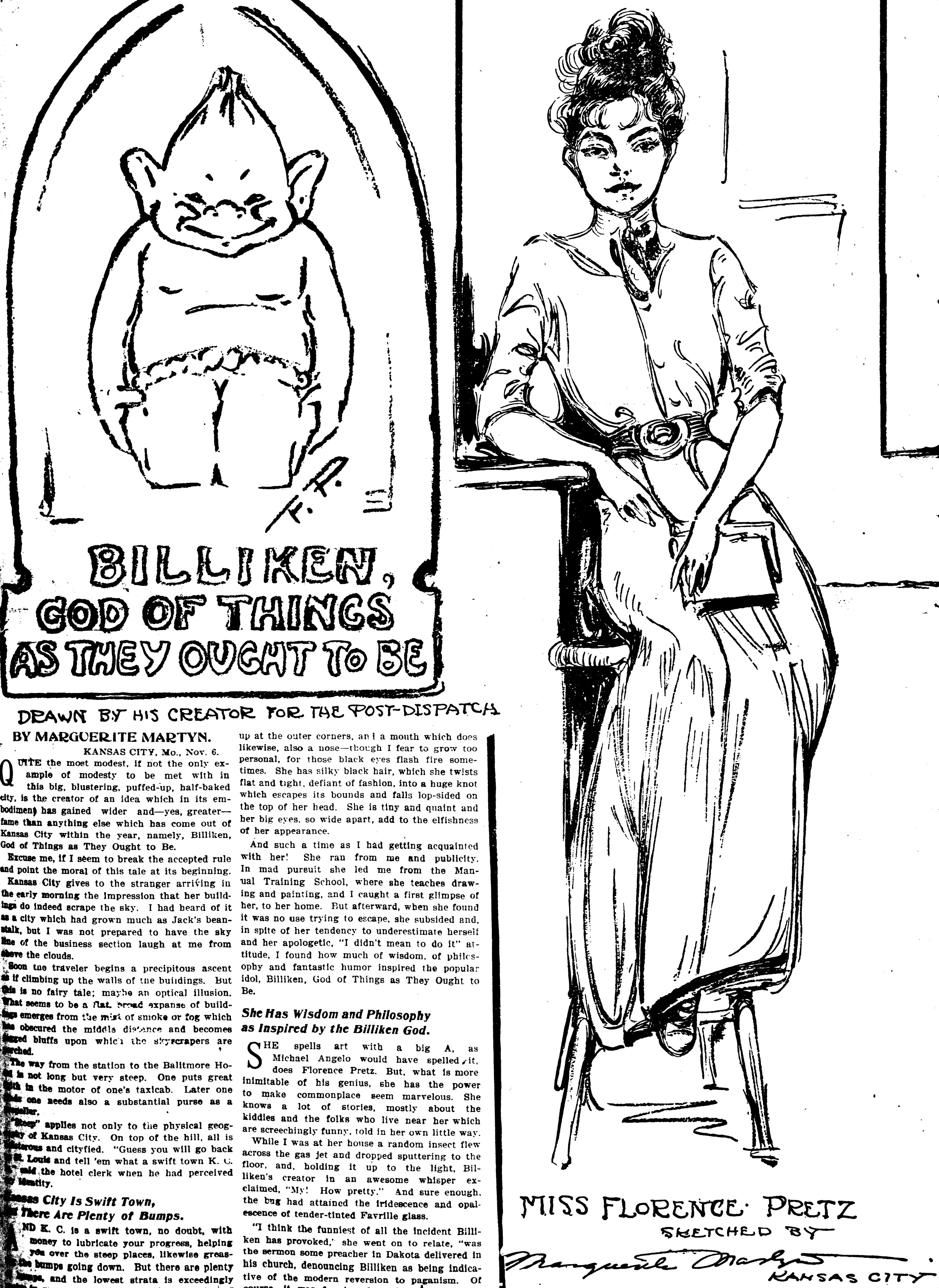
From the St. Louis Post-Dispatch of November 7, 1909, the Billiken sketch at the left is by Florence Pretz and the drawing of Pretz is by journalist Marguerite Martyn.

The Billiken is a charm doll created by an American art teacher and illustrator, Florence Pretz of Kansas City, Missouri, who is said to have seen the mysterious figure in a dream. It is believed that Pretz found the name Billiken in Bliss Carman's 1896 poem "Mr. Moon: A Song Of The Little People". In 1908, she obtained a design patent on the ornamental design of the Billiken, which she sold to the Billiken Company of Chicago. The Billiken was monkey-like with pointed ears, a mischievous smile, and a tuft of hair on his pointed head. His arms were short and he was generally sitting with his legs stretched out in front of him.

To buy a Billiken was said to give the purchaser luck, but to receive one as a gift would be better luck. The image was copyrighted and a trademark was put on the name. After a few years of popularity, the Billiken faded into obscurity. Although they are similar, the Billiken and the baby-like kewpie figures that debuted in the December 1909 Ladies' Home Journal are not the same.

Today, the Billiken is the official mascot of Saint Louis University and St. Louis University High School, both Jesuit institutions located in St. Louis. The Billiken is also the official mascot of the Royal Order of Jesters, an invitation-only Shriner group affiliated with Freemasonry. The Billiken also became the namesake of Billiken Shokai, the Japanese toy and model manufacturing company (established 1976).

== History ==
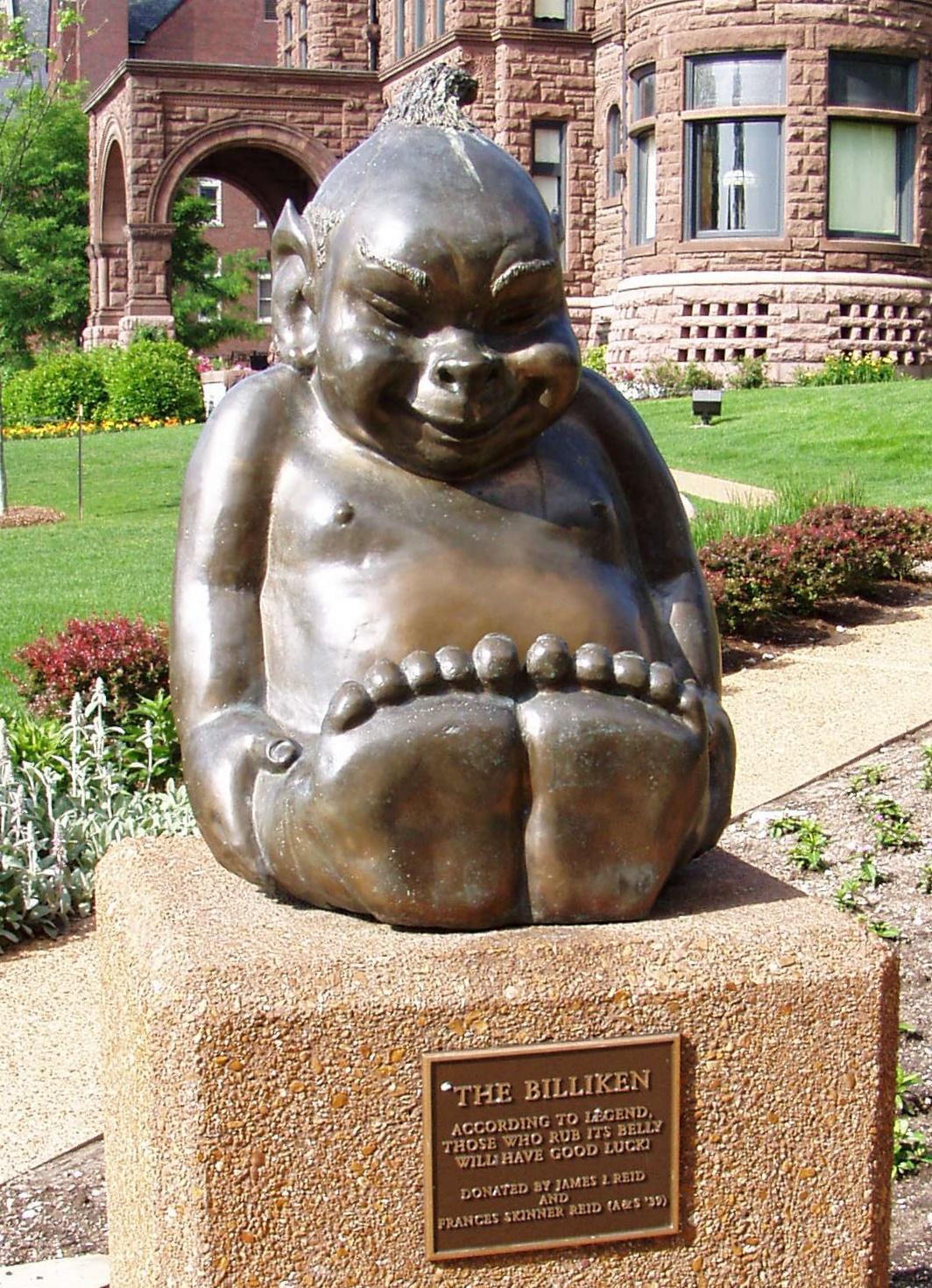
Billiken statue on the campus of Saint Louis University

The Billiken sprang from the height of the "Mind-Cure" craze in the United States at the start of the twentieth century. It represented the "no worry" ideal, and was a huge hit. Variations appeared, such as the "Teddy-Billiken Doll" and the Billycan/Billycant pair (to drive petty problems away). The Billiken helped touch off the doll craze of the era.

At least two Billiken-themed songs were recorded, including "Billiken Rag" and the "Billiken Man Song." The latter was recorded by Blanche Ring.

The Billiken, as a good luck charm, appears multiple times in the Vivien Leigh and Robert Taylor movie Waterloo Bridge. It is employed as a device that both prompts recollections of the male lead, Robert Taylor, and that links several scenes within the movie as the plot unfolds. Wizard of Oz author L. Frank Baum kept a Billiken doll on his piano.

The Billiken made its Japanese debut in 1908. A statue was installed in the uppermost level of the original Tsutenkaku Tower as it was opened to the public in 1912. When the nearby Luna Park was closed in 1925, the tower's Billiken statue disappeared. In 1980, a replacement statue made its appearance in a new Tsutenkaku Tower that was built in 1956.

== Sports mascot ==
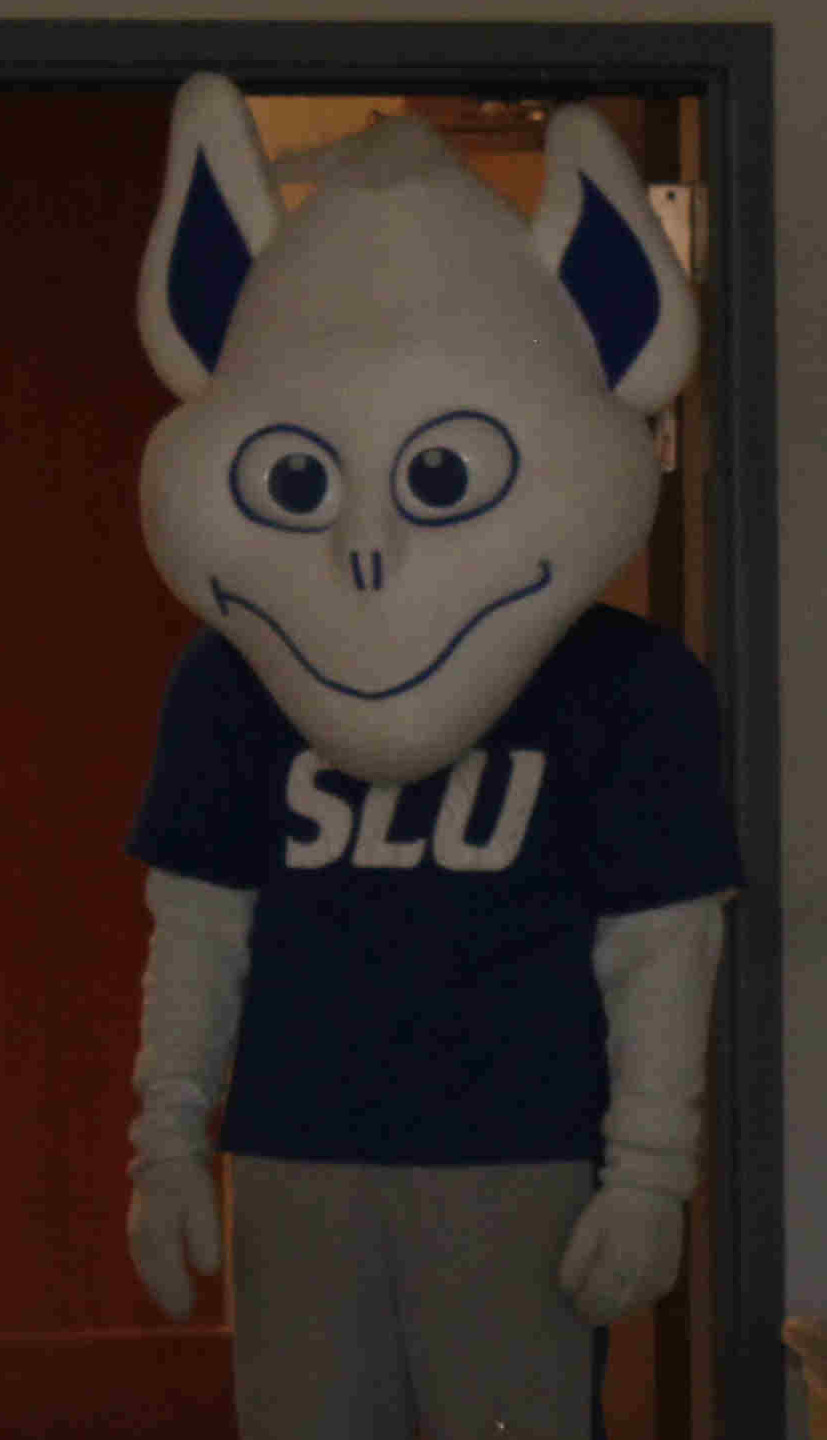
The mascot of the Saint Louis Billikens

In its heyday, the Billiken enjoyed worldwide celebrity. In the United States he became the athletic mascot of Saint Louis University, because the figure was said to resemble coach John R. Bender. The school's athletic teams remain the Saint Louis Billikens to this day. A bronze statue of the Billiken stands in front of the Chaifetz Arena on the Saint Louis University Campus. A junior version of the Billiken became the mascot of nearby St. Louis University High School; a stainless steel statue of the Junior Billiken stands adjacent to the Danis Fieldhouse, on the St. Louis University High School Campus. Bud Billiken was a youth-club mascot for The Chicago Defender, and was created in 1923, and is known more contemporarily as the inspiration for the yearly parade of the same name held shortly before the start of the school year.

The Billiken was the team nickname for several minor league professional baseball teams, including the Fort Wayne Billikens of the 1908–1910 Central League, the Montgomery Billikens of the 1910 Southern Association (a Class A league that ran from 1902 to 1935), the Bay City Billikens of the 1911 and 1912 Southern Michigan League (a league that dwelled in several classifications between 1906 and 1912), and the McLeansboro Billikens of the 1910 Kentucky–Illinois–Tennessee League ("KITTY League"), a Class D professional baseball league that ran from 1903 until 1955. McLeansboro is located in southern Illinois, 116 miles from St. Louis.

== Alaska ==
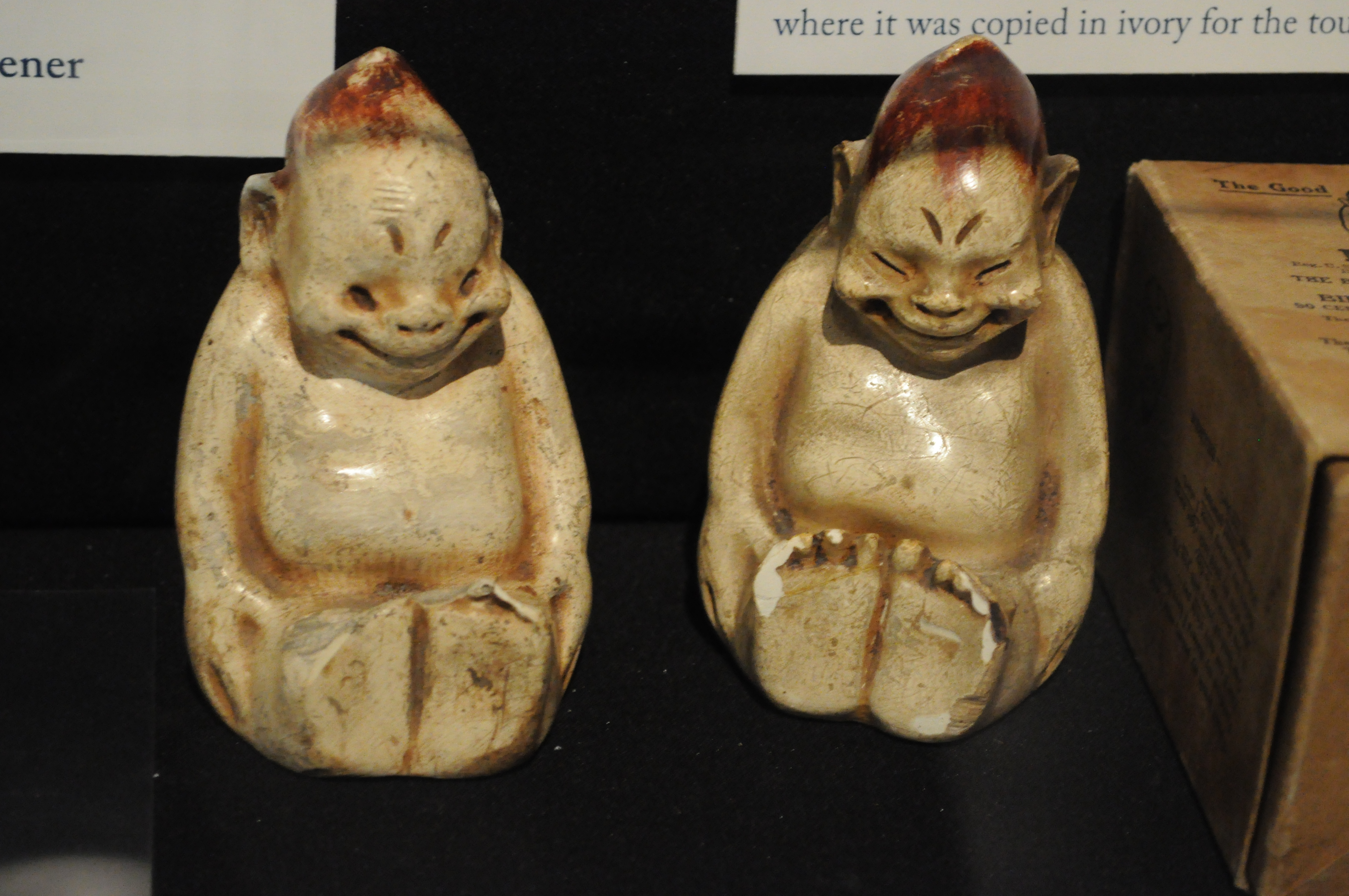
Two Billikens from the Alaska–Yukon–Pacific Exposition of 1909

In 1909, the Billiken began its appearance in souvenir shops of Alaska. In Nome, Alaska, an Inuk carver by the name Angokwazhuk copied a Billiken figurine in ivory brought to him by a merchant. Since that first appearance in Alaska, some Inuit carvers began to include the billiken in the collection of figurines they created. By the 1960s the Billiken was ubiquitous in larger Alaskan cities like Anchorage, and heavily touristed areas. Billikens were often carved from Alaskan ivory and were used in jewelry and knick-knacks. Often these souvenirs were accompanied by printed, romanticized Billiken lore. In Anchorage, the name was also adopted by merchants, as in the Billiken Drive-In movie theater.

== Japan ==
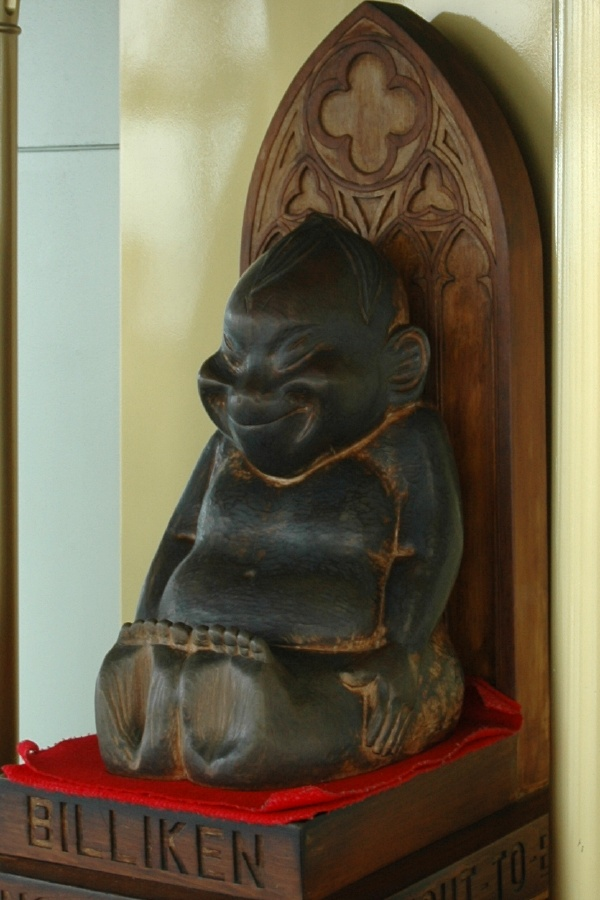
Wooden statue of the Billiken in Tsūtenkaku tower

Throughout Japan representations of the Billiken were enshrined. Pre-World War II statues of the Billiken could be found in Kobe city's Chinju Inari and Matsuo Inari shrines. Both of these statues were removed from display for many years at the onset of the war when foreign deities fell out of favor.

The most famous representation of the Billiken was in an amusement park, Luna Park, in the Shinsekai district of Osaka, Japan. In 1912, he was enshrined in the park as a symbol of Americana. Popular Billiken souvenirs in the park included dolls and manjū. When the park closed in 1923, the wooden statue of the Billiken went missing.

A replica of the statue was placed in the second-generation Tsūtenkaku Tower in 1980. The Billiken was a star in Sakamoto Junji's 1996 comedy Billiken in which the statue is restored to the Tsutenkaku in an effort to revive the popularity of the tower and save Shinsekai.

The statue was a permanent fixture in the tower until September 2005 when it made its first departure and was taken, as an ambassador of sorts, to Shibuya's Tokyu Hands department store in Tokyo as a part of a fair to promote Naniwa (traditional Osaka) culture. As a part of the cultural exchange, a replica of the statue of Shibuya's most famous dog, Hachikō, was sent to Osaka.

In October 2008, the Billiken of Tsutenkaku took a journey all the way from Japan to its "home" city of St. Louis, Missouri where it was visited by students of St. Louis University, whose mascot is also the Billiken.

Due to wear (particularly to the soles of the feet), the dark, worn statue replica from 1980 was replaced in May 2012 with a new one. Presently he resides on the fifth floor observation deck and has become closely associated with the tower. Each year thousands of visitors place a coin in his donation box and rub the soles of his well-worn feet to make their wishes come true.

The Billiken also became the namesake of Billiken Shokai, the Japanese toy and model manufacturing company established in 1976.

== See also ==
- Billiken, an Argentine children's magazine named after the doll
