= Doya-gai =

Neighborhood type in Japan

Doya-gai (ドヤ街, doya-gai, skid row) refers to neighborhoods where many day laborers live. Day laborers are those who are employed on a daily basis as a form of temporary employment. Doya is a back slang of yado, which means lodging in Japanese. It refers to areas where many simple lodging houses are concentrated in compliance with the Hotel Business Act. Famous doya-gai includes San'ya in Taito Ward, Tokyo; Kotobukicho in Naka Ward, Yokohama; and the Airin district in Nishinari Ward, Osaka.

== Overview ==
During Japan’s postwar period of rapid economic growth, many day laborers gathered at hiring sites where temporary jobs were arranged. This led to the formation of doya-gai neighborhood.

Unlike so-called slums, a prominent feature of doya-gai is that it is not entirely occupied by cheap lodging for day laborers—there are also middle-class residences. The population is predominantly single male manual laborers, which is another difference between the slums of pre-war Japan and those of other developing countries.

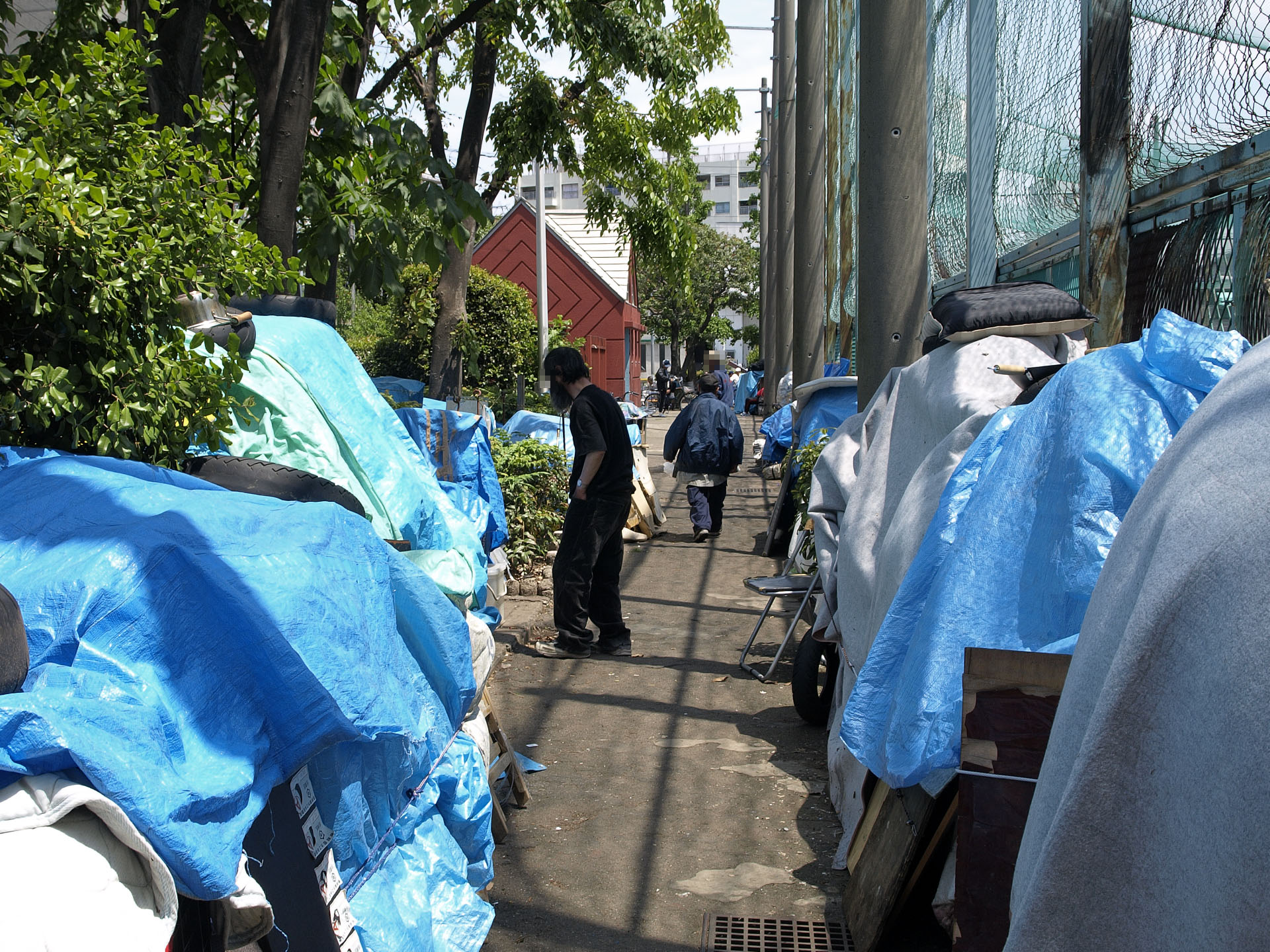
A street in San'ya, Taito Ward, Tokyo.

While there are hygiene issues and robberies and fights targeting day laborers returning from work, these areas are not high-crime zones, unlike slums in other countries.

Since the 2000s, doya-gai areas have been shrinking due to the aging of the labor force, but they have become increasingly popular among those who like to stroll through such districts, as they have been spared from tourism and land development and still retain the atmosphere of the Showa period (1926–1989).

Additionally, with many affordable lodgings and restaurants as well as a relatively safe environment, doya-gai areas like Airin district in Osaka have become popular among backpackers from overseas. As development potential still remains, hotel constructions are planned to meet rising demand, and doya-gai neighborhoods are gradually shifting from workers’ towns.

In 2022, the OMO7 Osaka, a luxury hotel under the prestigious Hoshino Resorts brand, opened in front of Shin-Imamiya Station in the Airin district.

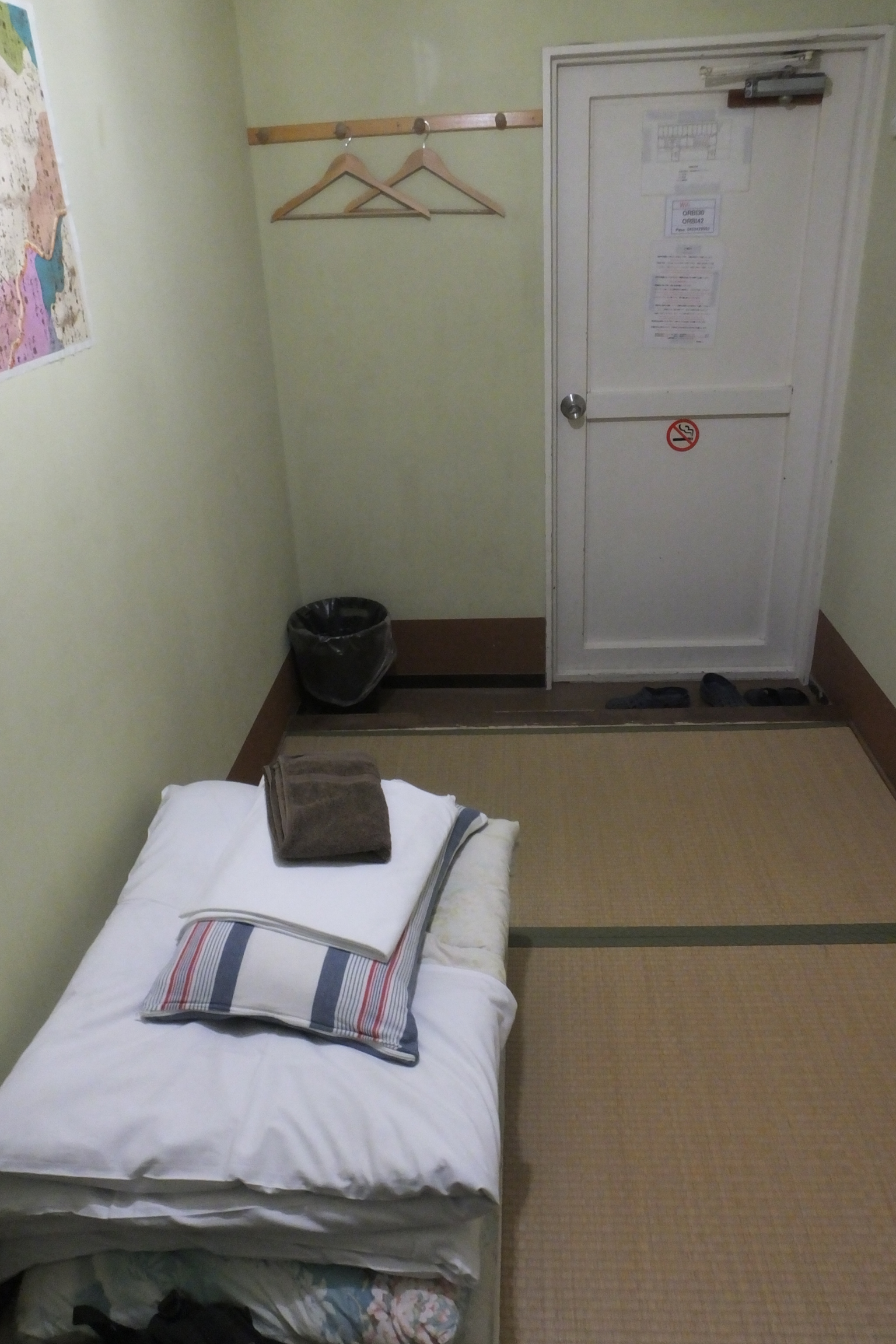
A doya room. Recently, many have undergone simple renovations to serve as budget hotels catering to foreign visitors.

Because many individuals in the doya neighborhoods are unable to receive public support, charitable organizations like the Salvation Army and citizen groups provide assistance such as soup kitchens and nightly patrols to prevent deaths from freezing.

Nevertheless, due to the poor living conditions of day laborers, numerous riots have occurred.

The most recent riot in Japan occurred in the Airin district, known as the 24th Nishinari Riot (or Kamagasaki Riot) in June 2008.

Related to this, New Left activists have infiltrated doya-gai neighborhoods under the guise of liberating the yoseba labor recruiting system and have attempted to organize day laborers through end-of-year campaigns. As a result, New Left agitprop and billboards, rarely seen in other areas, are found in doya-gai although left-wing activities are gradually fading away due to the aging of activists.
