= Royal Order of Jesters =

Fraternal organisation

The Royal Order of Jesters is a masonic male fraternal organization, allowing only Shriners in good standing to join. Admission is by invitation only.

== Formation ==
The original meeting resulting in the formation of the Order was held on February 20, 1911, by Shriners in the Captain’s office of the S.S. Wilhelmina to visit Aloha Temple in Hawaii. Noble A.M. Ellison of San Francisco, California was elected the leader (called a "director") and the original group, called "a cast", with thirteen members. It was later formally organized on June 25, 1917, at an informal meeting.

== About the organization ==
The official website for the Royal Order of Jesters describes itself as the following:

"Whereas most Masonic bodies are dedicated to charity, The Royal Order of Jesters is a fun 'degree,' with absolutely no serious intent. The motto, 'Mirth is King,' is sufficient to give voice to the purpose of the organization. The Royal Order of Jesters believe that there are times, after work and dedication to family and mankind when everyone should remember to laugh and appreciate the good work one has done."

The icon of the Order is the Billiken.

The order is very secretive and holds an anti-publicity policy. For example, a website made by one of its members was removed after the intervention of the national court of the Order. The primary reason behind this was the desire of the Board to minimize public exposure or public access to Jester information.

== Membership ==
Local "courts" are limited to thirteen initiates yearly and membership is by invitation only.

Prospective members must be a Shriner and also a Master Mason in a masonic lodge. Prospective members are usually selected due to their commitment to secrecy and are usually highly active or highly ranked within the Shriners organization and within Freemasonry.

Asking to join will almost certainly result in the individual never being accepted.

== Museum ==
The Royal Order of Jesters owns a museum in Indiana. On display are items relating to the Order. There are also items that belonged to William Shakespeare and other historical people who focused on humor in their works.

== Prostitution scandal ==
In 2008, four public officials from Western New York, including State Supreme Court Justice Ronald H. Tills, two retired police officers and a law clerk, were convicted of human trafficking for transporting a prostitute for a Royal Order of Jesters event. According to federal prosecutors, the Jesters had employed strippers and prostitutes for one of their parties, with some of the prostitutes being illegally transported over state lines for a Jester event. The FBI has investigated these cases. A former New York judge was sentenced to 18 months in jail. A former county sheriff's deputy also pleaded guilty.
