= Kamagasaki =

Old name for part of Nishinari-ku, Japan

Coordinates: 34°38′53″N 135°30′07″E

Kamagasaki (釜ヶ崎) is an old place name for a part of Nishinari-ku in Osaka, Japan, which has the largest day laborer concentration in Japan: 30,000 people are estimated to live in every 2,000 meter radius in this area, part of which has been in slum-like conditions.

The area surrounding Kamagasaki is upscale, clean and attracts tourists with popular sightseeing spots including the Tsutenkaku, Shinsekai, and Nipponbashi. However, in Kamagasaki, homeless people can often be seen sleeping in the streets throughout the day, and doya (ドヤ) hotels (cheap temporary rooms intended for day laborers) abound in the area. These hotels have recently become popular amongst backpackers from outside Japan due to their cheap price and proximity to rail transportation. The city government of Osaka does not allow the name "Kamagasaki" to appear on official maps and discourages the use of the name in the media. Sections of four different towns — Nishinari-ku Taishi (西成区太子), Haginochaya (萩之茶屋), Sannō (山王), North Hanazono (花園北) and Tengachaya (天下茶屋) — are collectively known as Kamagasaki.

As part of slum clearance in preparation for World Expo 2025, the government ordered the closure of the Airin Labor and Welfare Center, a symbol of Kamagasaki since its opening in 1970.

== History ==
Kamagasaki has been a place name since 1922. An accurate count of occupants has never been produced, even in the national census, due to the large population of day laborers who lack permanent addresses. Daily life in Kamagasaki in the 1950s was photographed by Seiryū Inoue, who won the 1961 Newcomer's Prize awarded by the Japan Photography Critics' Society for "One Hundred Faces of Kamagasaki". Airin-chiku (あいりん地区) became the area's official name in May 1966.

Non-profit and religious organizations frequently give out food rations, creating long lines of people in public parks. Property values in Kamagasaki are noticeably lower than those of surrounding areas.

A film set in the neighborhood by director Shingo Ōta (太田信吾) which was partially financed by the city, called "Fragile", was pulled from the 2013-2014 Osaka Asian Film Festival after Ota refused to cut scenes from the film that identified the location of the community and referenced certain aspects of its culture.

== Notable riots or protests ==
Several conflicts with the police have occurred in Kamagasaki since 1961 over perceived human rights violations by authorities. The mass media usually refer to these events using words that can be translated as "riot".

The first riot occurred on August 1, 1961, when an elderly day laborer from Kamagasaki was killed in a traffic accident. The official who arrived on the scene assumed that the man was already dead (only doctors are allowed to pronounce a death) and left the body on the street for over 20 minutes without calling an ambulance while he spoke with witnesses. A large group of day laborers surrounded the Nishinari police station in protest of the man's treatment, overturned parked police cars, and set fire to nearby apartment buildings. The Osaka Prefectural Police responded with 6,000 officers, using police sticks and vehicles to round up the rioters. It took two days to stop the 2,000 rioters; 28 were arrested. Approximately 10 rioters and 100 police officers were injured.

This riot became a national issue and was taken up in the prefectural legislature and national legislature of Japan. Several attempts were made to mend relationships between the groups, but minor riots continued to occur. In May 1966, it was decided that the official name of Kamagasaki would be changed to Airin-chiku (あいりん地区) in an attempt to improve the area's crime-ridden image. The name Kamagasaki is still commonly used amongst inhabitants, while the name Airin-chiku is used by the media and government officials.

The 22nd riot occurred in October 1990, 17 years after the last riot in 1973. This riot also involved local day laborers but grew in proportion when youths from outside Kamagasaki joined in. Shin-Imamiya Station and local stores were set on fire during this riot, and it took several days to calm the area.

The 23rd riot occurred in October 1992, and a large-scale riot did not occur for over 10 years. This was the last large-scale riot to occur in Japan before the 34th G8 summit.

The 24th conflict with the police occurred on June 13, 2008, and it continued for six days. It was related to the 34th G8 summit. One day before the G8 Finance Ministers' Meeting started in Osaka with a very large police presence, a day laborer in Kamagasaki was allegedly tortured by the police. In protest, many day laborers and other local citizens carried out several days of street protests. Much of the mass media referred to the protests as "riots".

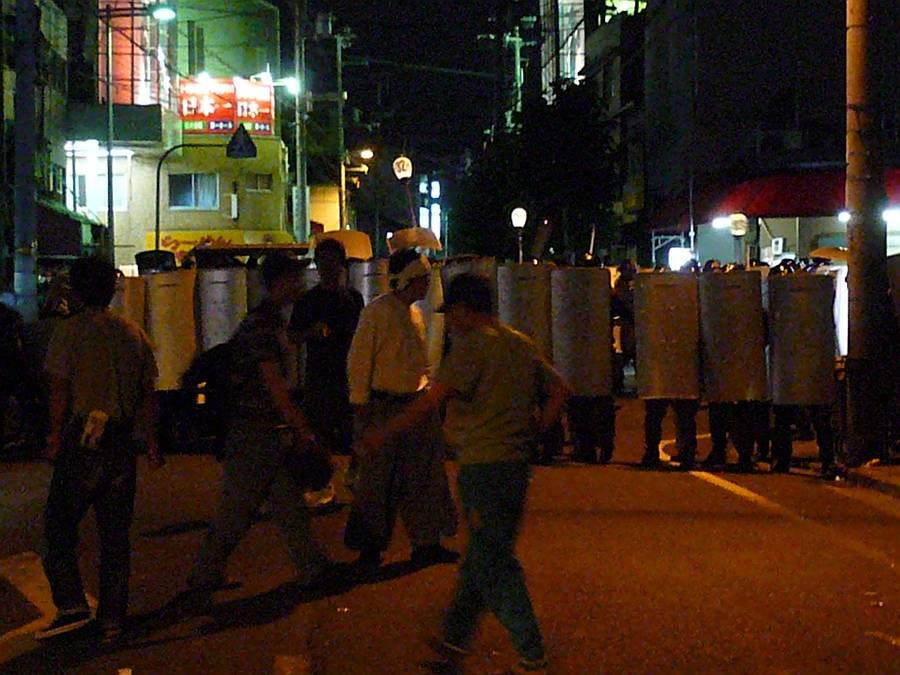
The 24th Kamagasaki Riot

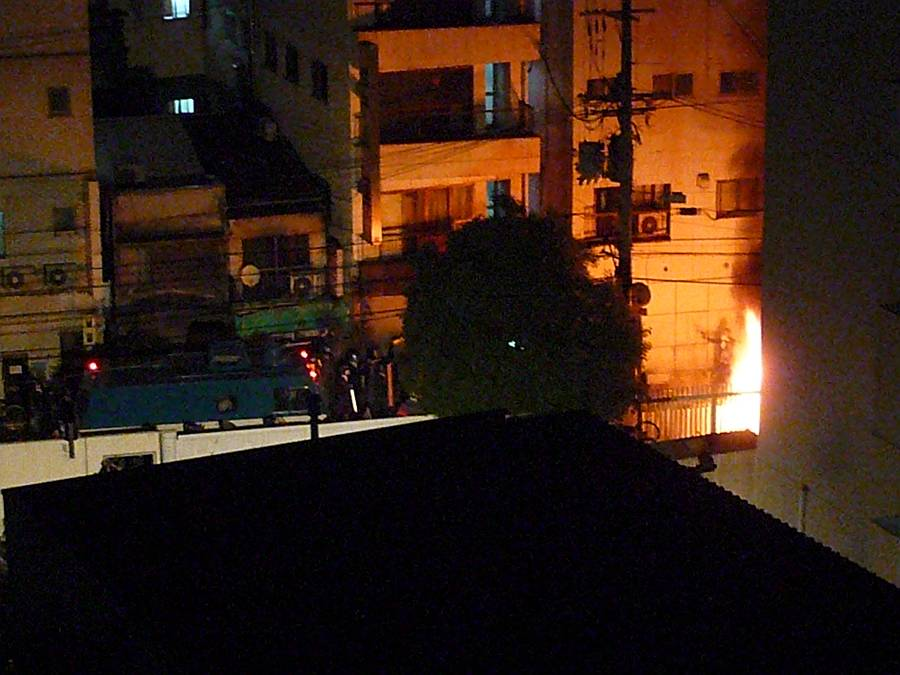
The 24th Kamagasaki Riot

== Education ==
Nursery school: Wakakusa Nursery School, 2-9-2 Haginochaya

Primary schools: Haginochaya Primary School, 1-11-15 Haginochaya; Koji Primary School, 2-16-26 Hanazonokita

In 1962 Airin School (renamed to Airin Elementary and Junior High School the next year) was founded. (In 1973, it was renamed Osaka City Shin-Imamiya Elementary and Junior High School. It closed in 1984.) The requirements of entering is not having register or resident registration.

Junior high school: Imamiya Junior High School, 1-8-32 Hanazonokita

Other school: UNION Theology University Extension Study, 3-4-23 Haginochaya

== Welfare ==
The number of people who receive Life Protection is the highest in Japan (176 people per 1,000). The city of Tokyo is 17, Nagoya is 13, Fukuoka is 19, Osaka City is 42.

The percentage of people who receive school attendance is 50.4% (whole of Japan is 13.7%, Osaka-fu is 24.7%, Osaka City is 33.8%).

== Gallery ==
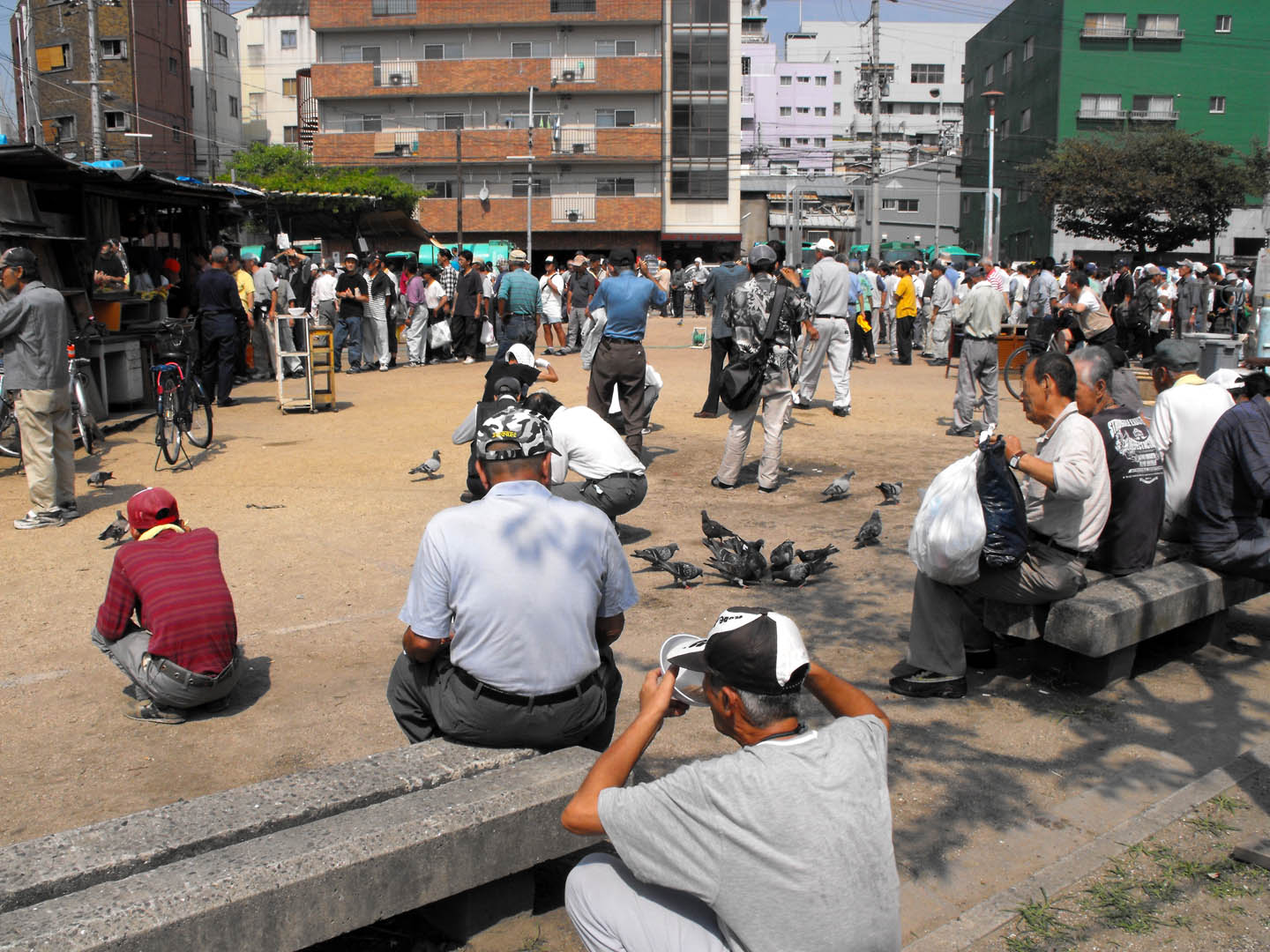
Triangle Park

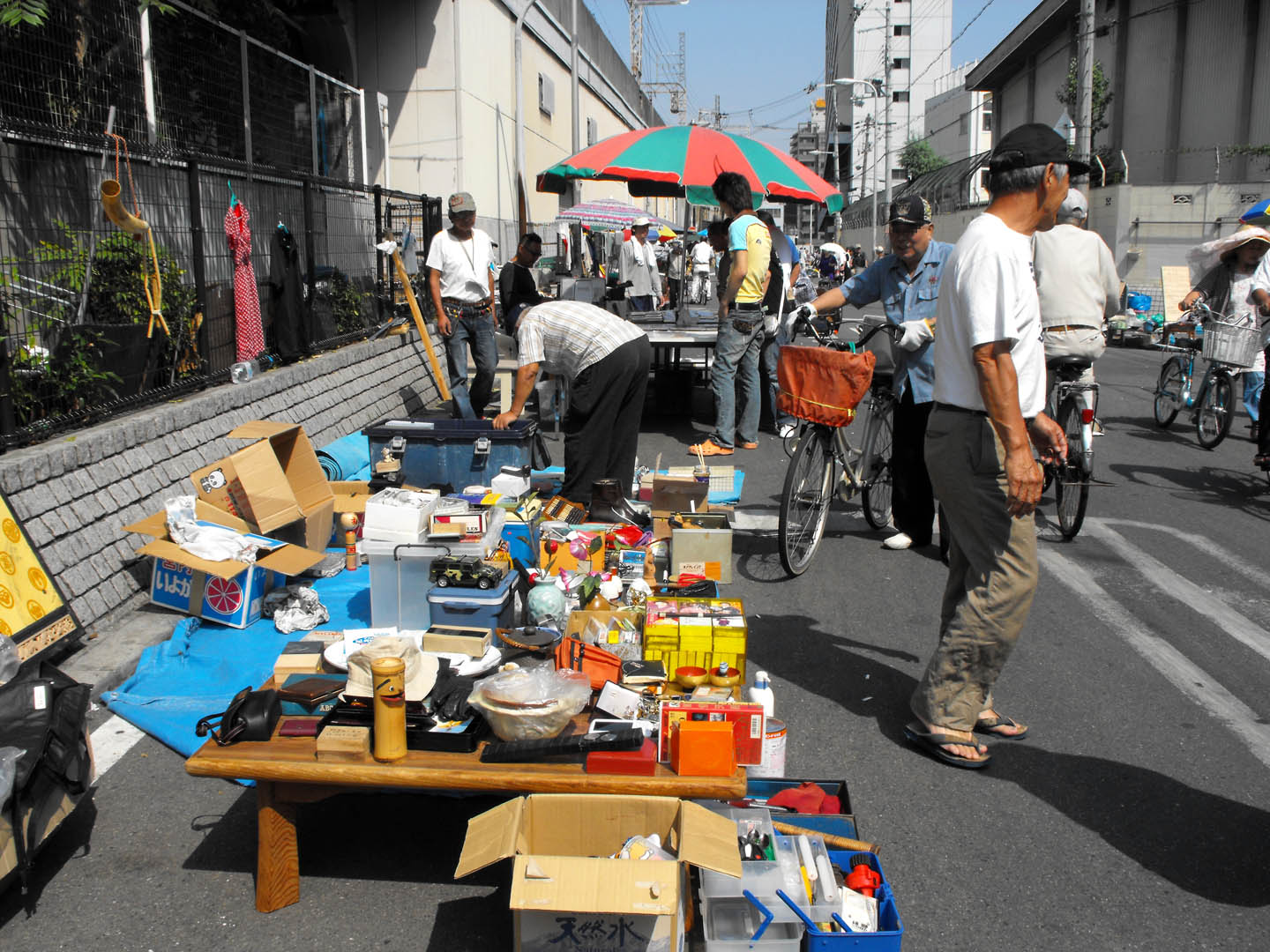
Street vendor

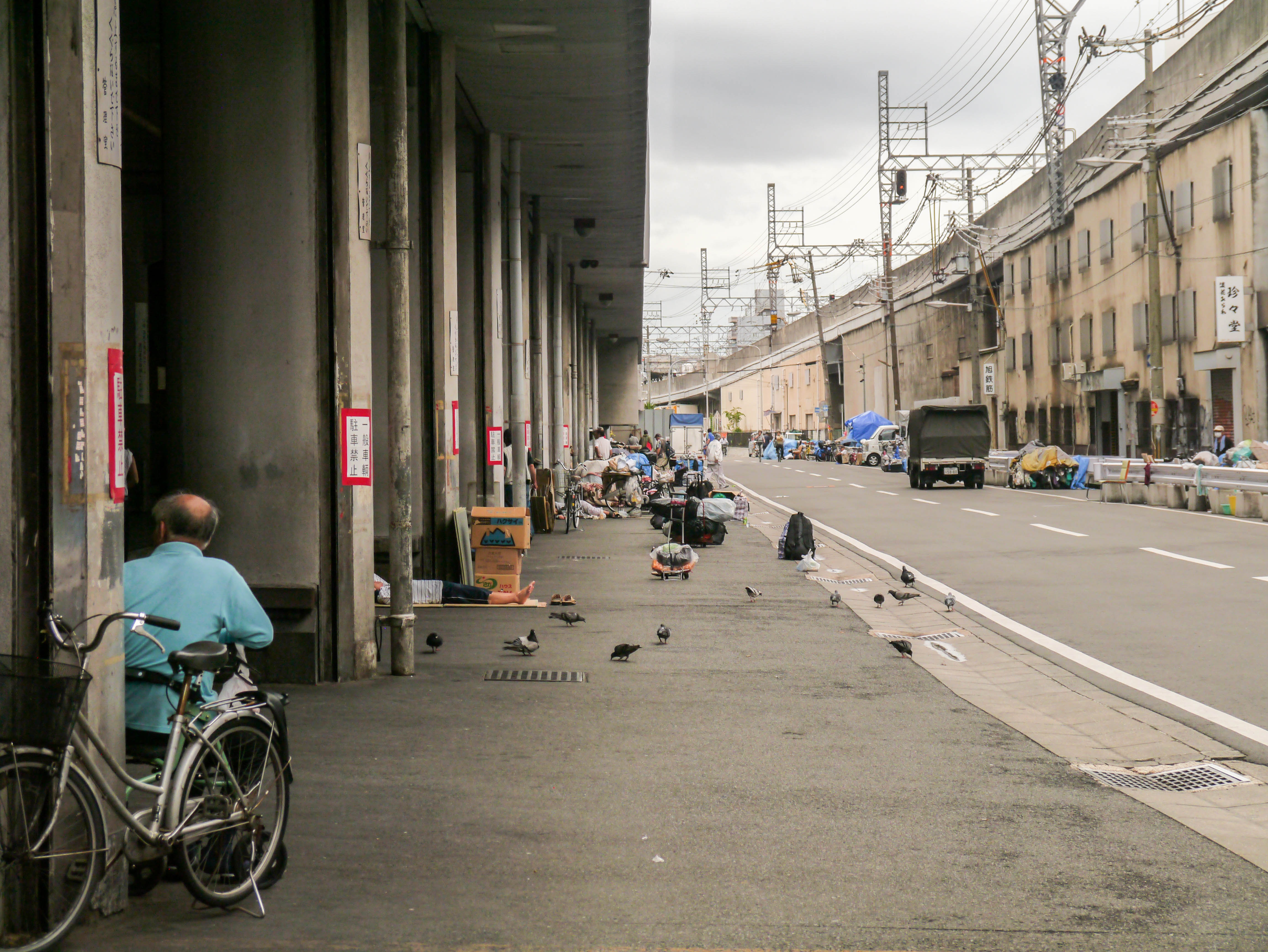
Streets of Kamagasaki

== Transportation ==
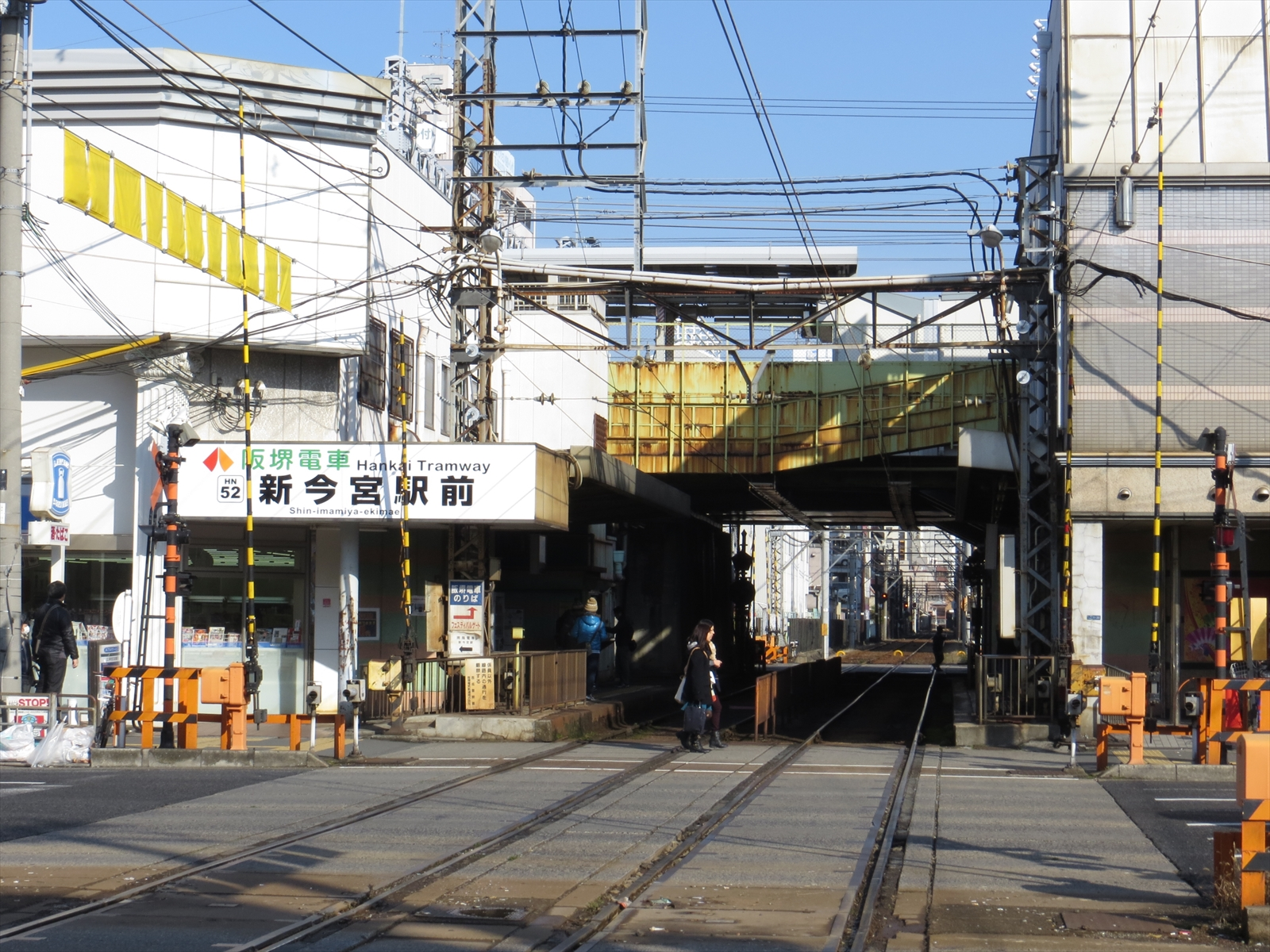
Shin-Imamiya Station

- West Japan Railway Company
  - Osaka Loop Line: Shin-Imamiya Station
- Osaka Municipal Subway
  - Midōsuji Line: Dōbutsuen-mae Station
  - Sakaisuji Line: Dōbutsuen-mae Station
  - Yotsubashi Line: Hanazonochō Station
- Nankai Railway
  - Nankai Main Line: Shin-Imamiya Station
  - Kōya Line: Shin-Imamiya Station, Haginochaya Station
- Hankai Tramway
  - Hankai Line: Minamikasumichō Station, Imaike Station

== Public institutions ==
- Nishinari Police Station
- Nishinari Fire Department
- Airin Labor and Welfare Center
- Nishinari Labor Hello Work
- Hospital attached to Osaka Social Medical Center
- Nishinari Citizen Center
- Taishi Hall・Rest House for Old Men

== Events ==
Memorial service at the 38th Kamagasaki Summer Festival

The 28th Twilight Concert

- Kamagasaki May Day May 1
- Kamagasaki Summer Festival August 13–15
- Twilight Concert
- Energy Festival
- Evening Variety Show
- Come Here Festival
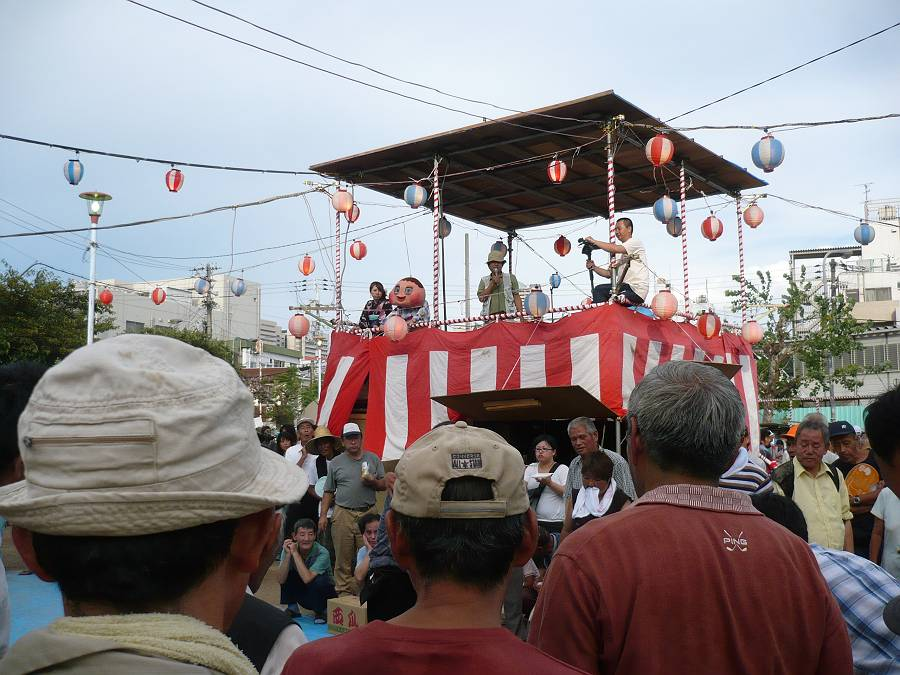
Kamagasaki Summer Festival

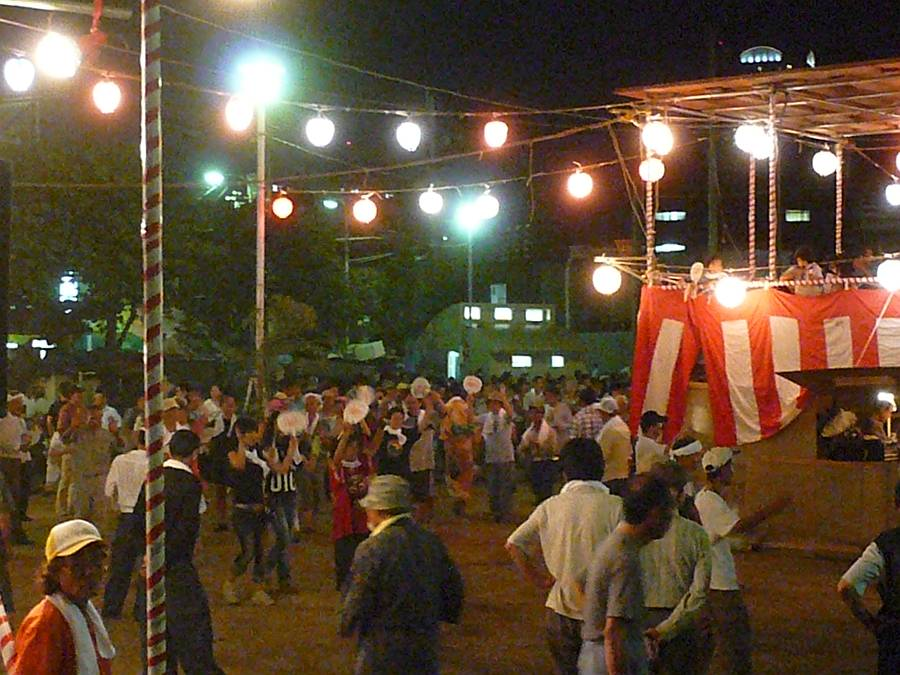
Kamagasaki Summer Festival

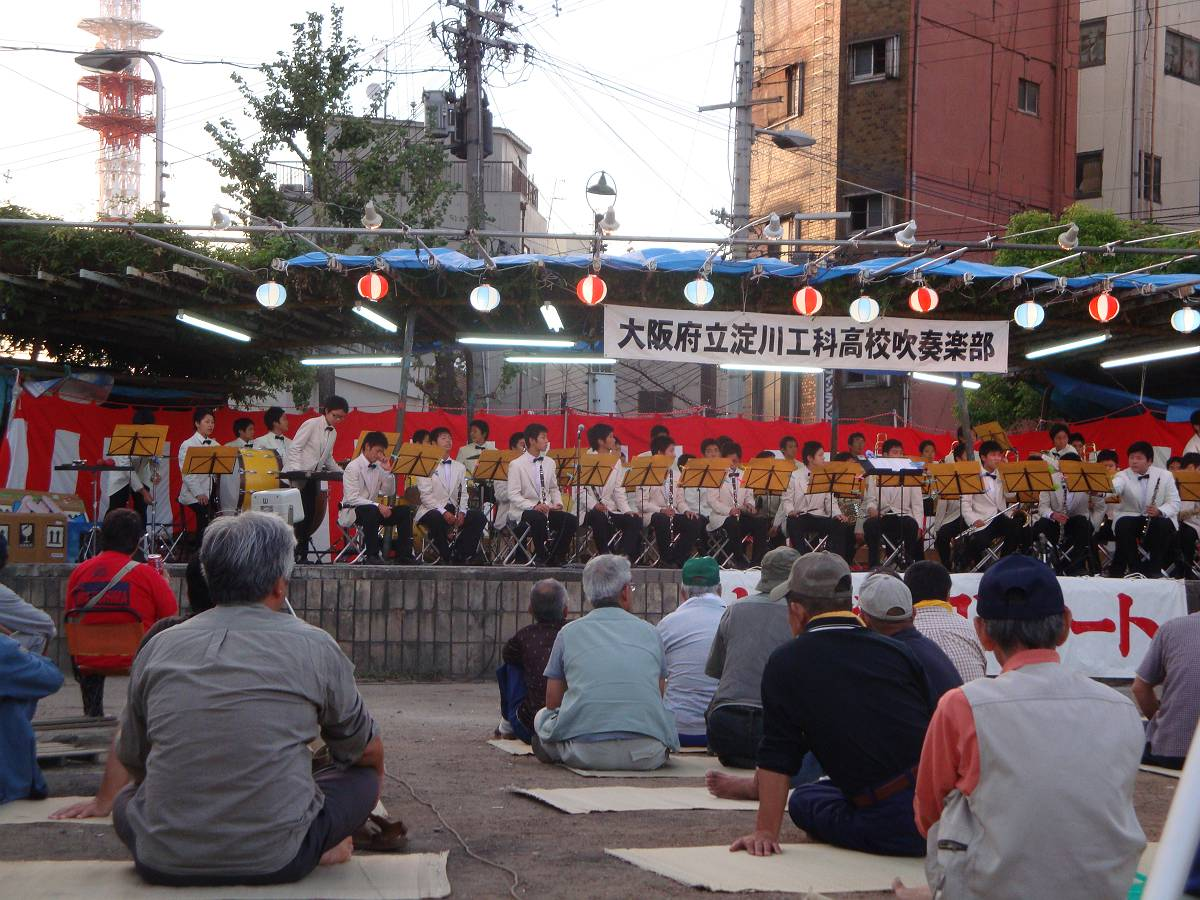
Twilight Concert

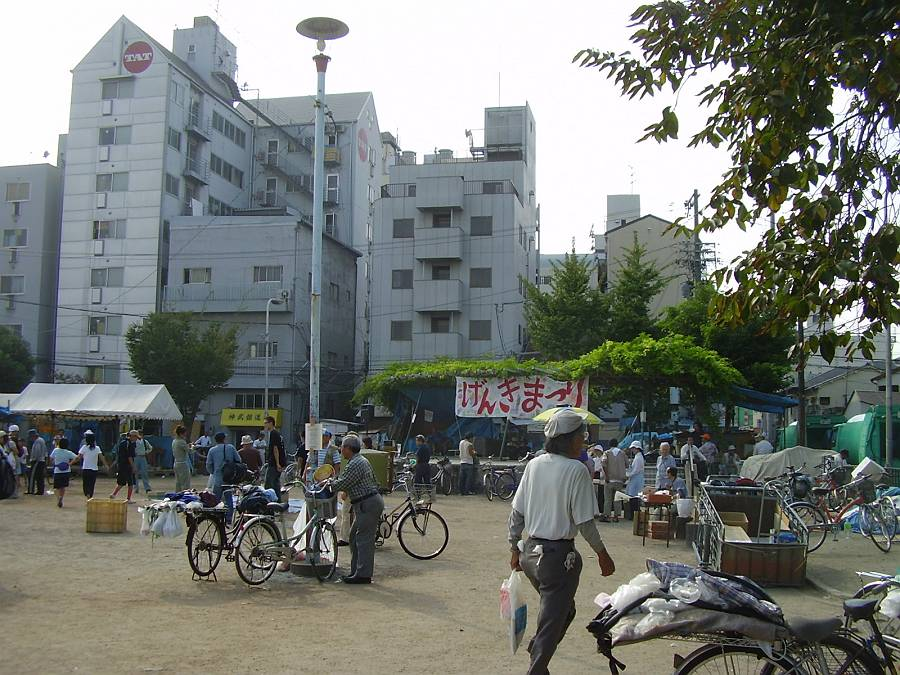
Energy Festival

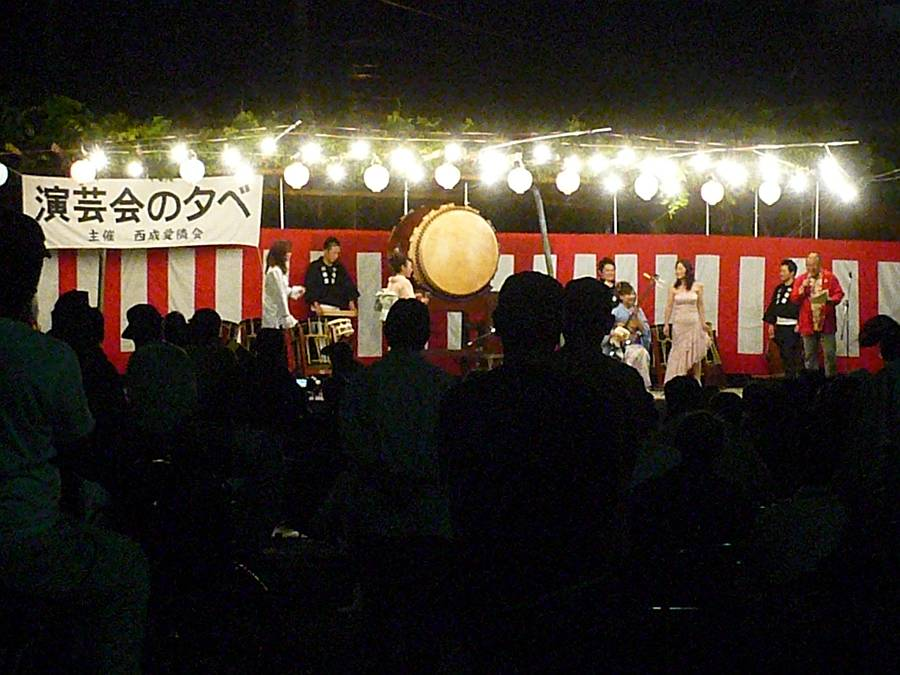
Evening Variety Show

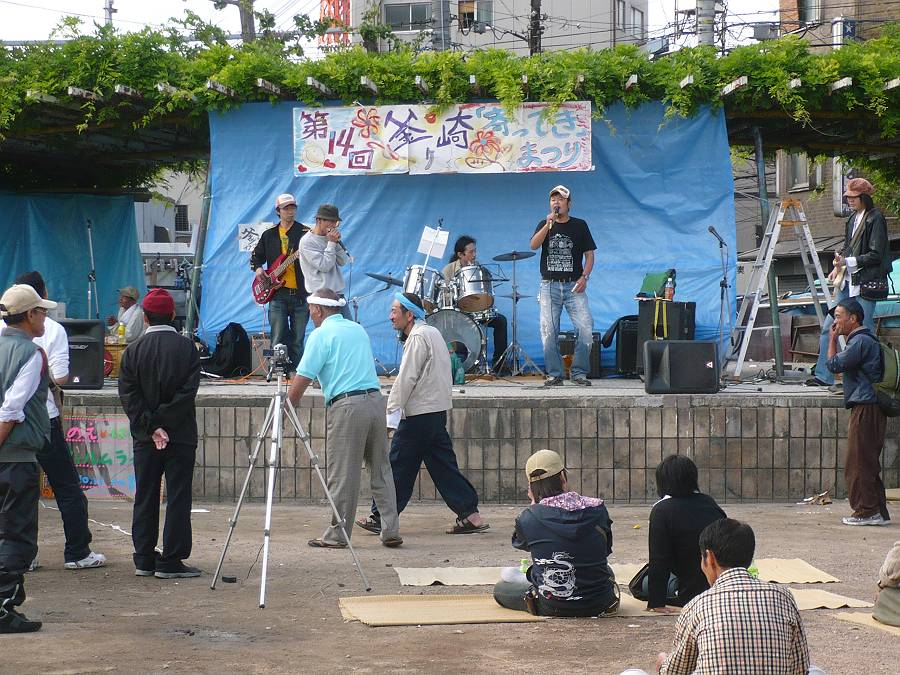
Come Here Festival

== See also ==
- Tobita Shinchi
- Shinsekai
- Nishinari-ku, Osaka, one of 24 wards of Osaka
- Seiryū Inoue, photographer of Kamagasaki in 1950s-1960s
