= Seiryū Inoue =

Japanese photographer

Seiryū Inoue (井上 青龍, Inoue Seiryū; 1931 – 18 August 1988) was a Japanese photographer.

Born in 1931 in Tosa, Kōchi Prefecture, Inoue became the first apprentice to Takeji Iwamiya in Osaka in 1951. While continuing to work with Iwamiya in 1954, he started work as temporary cameraman for Asahi Broadcasting Corporation in Osaka.

Iwamiya recognized his talent and from 1958 encouraged the young Inoue to roam the streets of Kamagasaki in Nishinari-ku, Osaka, permitting him to develop his private work in the studio darkroom. During the 1950s, Inoue developed a reputation as a young documentary photographer. In 1959 he was a prizewinner in the Fuji Photo Film Contest Professional Section. In Tokyo, during May 1960, he held his first solo exhibition, "The Hundred Faces of Kamagasaki", which was awarded Newcomer Prize by Camera Geijutsu magazine. In 1961 he also received the Newcomer's Award from the Japan Photography Critics' Association.

In 1959, Daidō Moriyama joined Iwamiya's studio before moving to Tokyo in 1961. Moriyama credits Inoue with setting him on the road to photography and as being highly influential in developing his photographic style. Writing for Inoue's Retrospective exhibition in 2005, Moriyama wrote: "his words - 'You coming, Mori?' - calling me to accompany him to Kamagasaki set me on the road to becoming a photographer" and "without the pioneering Inoue I would not have set out upon the long road of photography that I have followed".

Inoue continued to work in Osaka, becoming a teacher of documentary photography at Osaka Geijutsu (Art) University and eventually a full professor in 1987.

Following his work in Kamagasaki, Inoue photographed ethnic Koreans emigrating from Japan to North Korea and the festivals and city of Kyoto, among other subjects. He was engaged in photographing daily life on the Amami Islands in Kagoshima Prefecture when he met an accidental death in Tokunoshima in 1988.

== Books of Inoue's works ==
- Inoue Seiryū Shashinshū Kamagasaki (井上青龍写真集 釜ヶ崎) / Seiryū Inoue Photography Book: Kamagasaki Ginga Shobo, Osaka, 1985. Includes poetry by Kamagasaki resident Higashibuchi Osamu (東淵修). In Japanese.
- Hysteric One: Inoue Seiryu Hysteric Glamour, Tokyo, 2005.
- Shashinka Inoue Seiryū Kaikoten (写真家井上青龍回顧展) / Retrospective Exhibition of Seiryū Inoue, Photographer. Amagasaki City Sogo Bunka Centre, 2005. In Japanese. This book also contains a detailed biography and several articles in memory of Inoue, including one by Daidō Moriyama.
- Inoue Seiryu / Kojima Ichiro Rat Hole, Tokyo, 2007.
