= Jarinko Chie =

Japanese manga series

- DVD box set of Chie the Brat as released by TMS and Bandai Visual and illustrated by Etsumi Haruki.

じゃりン子チエ
- Manga
- Written by: Etsumi Haruki
- Published by: Futabasha
- Magazine: Weekly Manga Action
- Original run: 1978 – 1997
- Volumes: 67
- Film
- Jarinko Chie (1981)
- Anime television series
- Directed by: Isao Takahata
- Studio: Tokyo Movie Shinsha
- Licensed by: NA: Discotek Media
- Original network: MBS
- Original run: October 3, 1981 – March 25, 1983
- Episodes: 64 + 1 bonus episode
- Anime television series

Jarinko Chie 2
- Directed by: Kazuyoshi Yokota
- Written by: Hideo Takayashiki; Hiroaki Sato; Kazuyoshi Yokota; Tomoko Konparu; Yoshio Takeuchi
- Studio: Tokyo Movie Shinsha
- Licensed by: NA: Discotek Media
- Original network: MBS
- Original run: October 19, 1991 – September 22, 1992
- Episodes: 39

Jarinko Chie (Japanese: じゃりン子チエ; lit. "Chie the Brat") is a Japanese manga series written and illustrated by Etsumi Haruki. It was serialized by Futabasha in Manga Action between 1978 and 1997 and collected in 67 bound volumes, making it the 45th longest manga released. Jarinko Chie received the 1981 Shogakukan Manga Award for general manga.

Jarinko Chie was adapted twice, first as an anime theatrical film produced by Tokyo Movie Shinsha and Toho and directed by Isao Takahata, which premiered in Japan on April 11, 1981. This was followed by a 64-episode anime television series also produced by Tokyo Movie Shinsha and directed by Takahata, which was broadcast in Japan between October 3, 1981, and March 25, 1983. A sequel anime television series with 39 episodes followed on October 19, 1991, to September 22, 1992.

The official English title of the anime is Downtown Story.

== Characters ==
=== Chie Takemoto ===
A girl with a short temper.

=== Tetsu Takemoto ===
Chie's father is a mostly unemployed gambler and tough guy.

=== Kotetsu ===
Chie's pet cat, his trademark is a moon on the forehead.

== Video games ==
None of the video games were released outside Japan.

Title	System	Release date	Publisher
Jarinko Chie: Bakudan Musume no Shiawase Sagashi	Famicom	July 15, 1988	Konami
Simple Characters 2000 Series Vol. 04: The Hanafuda Jarinko Chie	PlayStation	November 29, 2001	Bandai
