= Etsumi Haruki =

Japanese manga artist (born 1947)

Etsumi Haruki (はるき 悦巳, Haruki Etumi; born May 28, 1947 in Osaka) is a Japanese manga artist. He received the 1981 Shogakukan Manga Award for General for Jarinko Chie.
