= Luna Park, Osaka =

Amusement park in Osaka, Japan

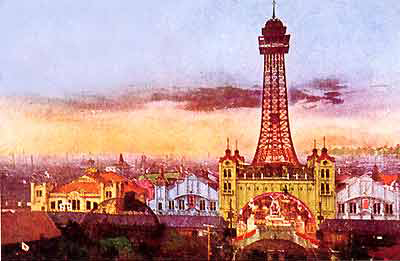
Original Tsutenkaku Tower, with Osaka (Shinsekai) Luna Park in the foreground, ca. 1912. The arch in the right foreground marks the park's main entrance in Shinsekai; the buildings and the tower in the background are in nearby Tsutenkaku.

Osaka's Luna Park (Runa pāku, also known as Shinsekai Luna Park) was Japan's second amusement park of the same name, replacing the destroyed Luna Park in Tokyo. In operation from 1912 to 1923, the 132,000 square meter park in the Shinsekai section of Osaka featured a unique entrance: an aerial tramway from the original Tsutenkaku Tower.

== History ==
The park was constructed and owned by Ken'ichi Kawaura after he sold his interest in the Japanese motion picture company Yoshizawa Shōten to Shōkichi Umeya in the wake of the destruction by fire of Luna Park, Tokyo and two Osaka theaters in 1911. Prior to the suspicious fires, all three were owned by the film studio.

Rather than rebuilding in Tokyo, Kawaura decided to build his second Luna Park in Shinsekai ("New World"), an Osaka subdivision that was under construction at the time. At the same time, the original Tsutenkaku Tower was being built in nearby Tsutenkaku to the north. Plans were being made to connect the 86 m (282 ft) tower to the park by an aerial tramway to provide visitors a unique "flying sensation" as they entered the park.

The Osaka Luna Park featured an arcade, mechanical rides (including one called the Circular Wave, which had seated riders rise and fall as the revolve in a circular motion), a funhouse, a music hall, a theater, and a hot springs spa.

The Osaka Luna Park closed permanently after the 1925 season; in January 1943, the first Tsutenkaku Tower was destroyed by a fire and was subsequently closed and demolished by the Japanese government. A new Tsutenkaku Tower was built and opened to the public in 1956.

== Gallery ==
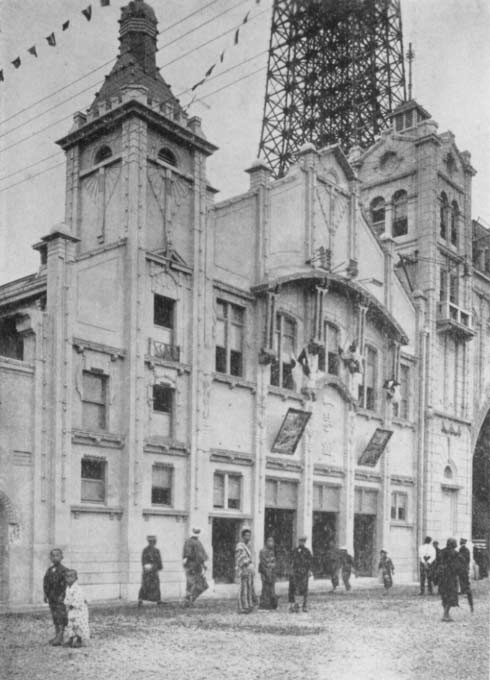
Ichigō-kan (Pavilion #1) of Osaka Luna Park, between 1912 and 1920.

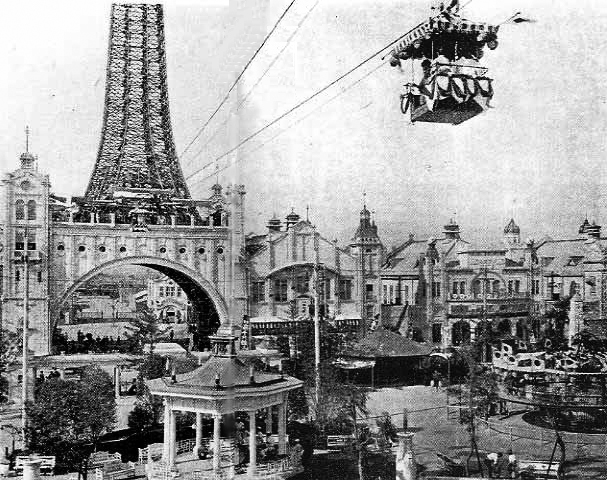
Aerial tramway connecting the original Tsutenkaku Tower with Luna Park, Osaka in Shinsekai, in the 1910s

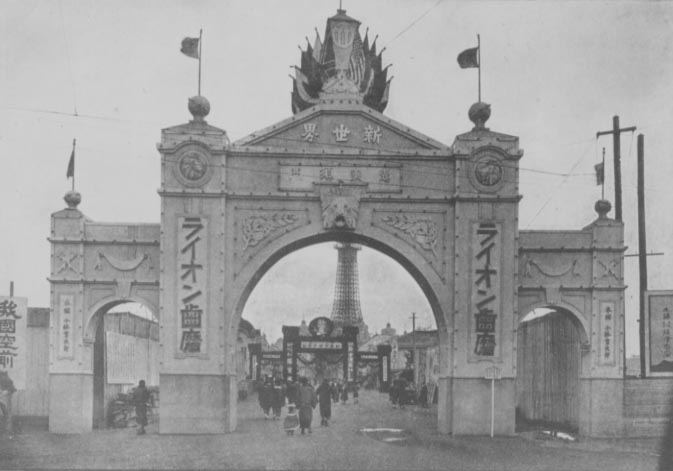
Main entrance of Osaka Luna Park, ca. 1912. The original Tsutenkaku Tower can be seen in the background through the entrance arch.

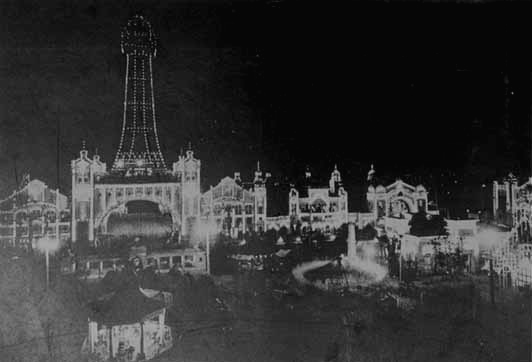
Nighttime picture of the original Tsutenkaku Tower, with Osaka (Shinsekai) Luna Park in the foreground, ca. 1912
