= Tobita Shinchi =

Red-light district in Osaka, Japan

- 飛田新地 (Japanese)
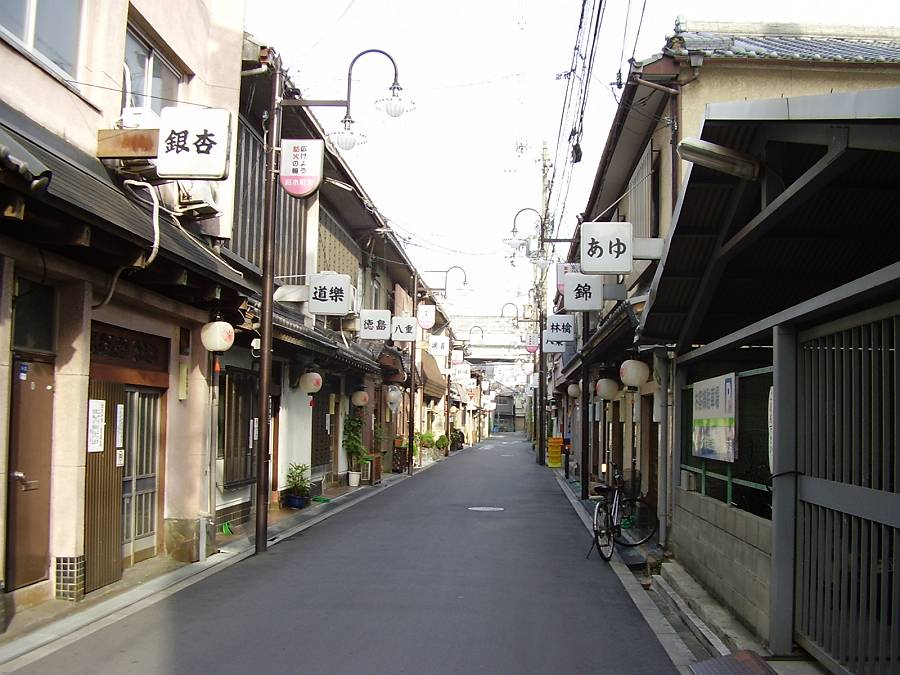
- Tobita Shinchi street
- Interactive map of Tobita Shinchi
- 34°38′39.57″N 135°30′19.60″E
- Type: Brothel area
- Location: Nishinari-ku, Osaka

History
- Built: 1912

Tobita Shinchi (飛田新地), also known as Tobita Yūkaku (飛田遊廓), is the largest of the brothel districts in Osaka, and also the largest in western Japan. Located in the Sanno 3-chōme area of Nishinari-ku, Osaka, Tobita Shinchi dates from the Taishō period. To circumvent the anti-prostitution laws, the brothels operate largely under the guise of being "Japanese-style restaurants" (ryōtei).

== Overview ==
The area consists of three main streets: Youth Street (青春通り, Seishun Dōri), Main Street (メイン通り, Mein Dōri) and Big Gate Street (大門通り, Ōmon Dōri). Additional side streets south of the main area are nicknamed Monster Street (妖怪通り, Yōkai Dōri) and Pension Street (年金通り, Nenkin Dōri) for their selection of older women in their thirties or above.

Tobita brothels, similar to how brothels in Amsterdam have women in the windows, tend to have a young woman kneeling by the genkan (entryway) or in the living room (which is fully open to the street) of the brothel to attract customers—an unusual practice for brothels in Japan. Often the women are dressed in schoolgirl or nurse costumes. Most of the prostitutes are Japanese, although there are some zainichi (Koreans or Chinese).

An elderly woman called the yarite babaa or mama-san, often the owner of the residence, sits in the genkan and greets male passers-by with phrases like douzo, onii-san (どうぞ、お兄さん, "Welcome, young man"). Many of the brothels will only accept Japanese or those capable of speaking fluent Japanese. The area is popular with visitors from China, Taiwan and Korea.

The nearest metro and mainline stations are Dōbutsuen-mae Station.

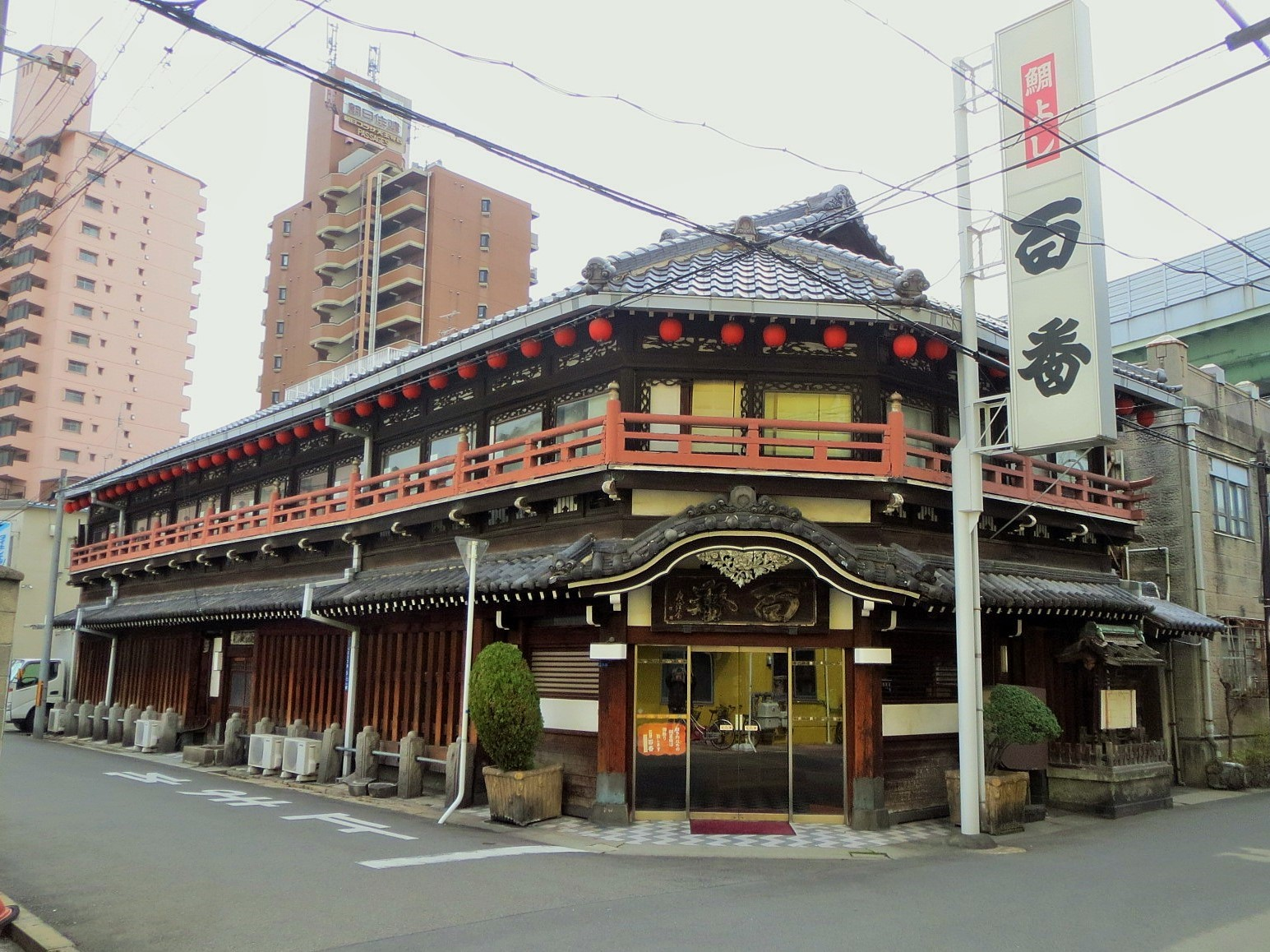
Taiyoshi Hyakuban in 2020

One of the oldest buildings in the area, the Taiyoshi Hyakuban, was given 'cultural property' status in 2000. It was originally built as a 21-room brothel in 1918 and was converted to a restaurant in 1970. The themed rooms of the brothel have been retained.

== History ==
During the Edo period, the site that was to become Tobita Shinchi was used as an execution ground, and remained one of the biggest cemeteries in Osaka.

On 16 January 1912, the red-light district of Namba Shinchi in the Namba district of Osaka, containing 2,000 prostitutes and 100 brothels, burnt down. The brothels were moved to the current Tobita Shinchi location after the old cemetery was cleared from the grounds. The area is on the south side of the then newly built Shinsekai entertainment area, which was thought to be advantageous. However, there were many protests from anti-prostitution campaigners to the setting up of the new brothel district. Tobita Shinchi was one of the last licensed yūkaku areas to be created.

The area escaped the bombing of Osaka during World War II, and continued to thrive until the Prostitution Prevention Law came into effect on 1 April 1958. However the area only closed for one night, the brothels re-opening as "restaurants" the next day.

== Tobita Restaurant Association ==
To circumvent the anti-prostitution laws, the brothels operate as restaurants. Tea and snacks are served to the client in a private room. Subsequent sexual contact between the "waitress" and the client is viewed as a "private affair" between them under Osaka's liberal interpretation of the law.

The brothels organised themselves into a trade association, the Tobita Restaurant Association (飛田新地料理組合, Tobita Ryōri Kumiai), although some genuine restaurants in the area are members. Former governor of Osaka Prefecture and mayor of Osaka Tōru Hashimoto was a legal adviser of the association.

It was reported in May 2019 that all restaurants (159 shops) in the Tobita Restaurant Association were going to be closed on June 28 and 29, 2019, for the 2019 G20 Osaka summit.

== See also ==
- Prostitution in Japan
