= Shinsekai =

Shinsekai 新世界
- Area
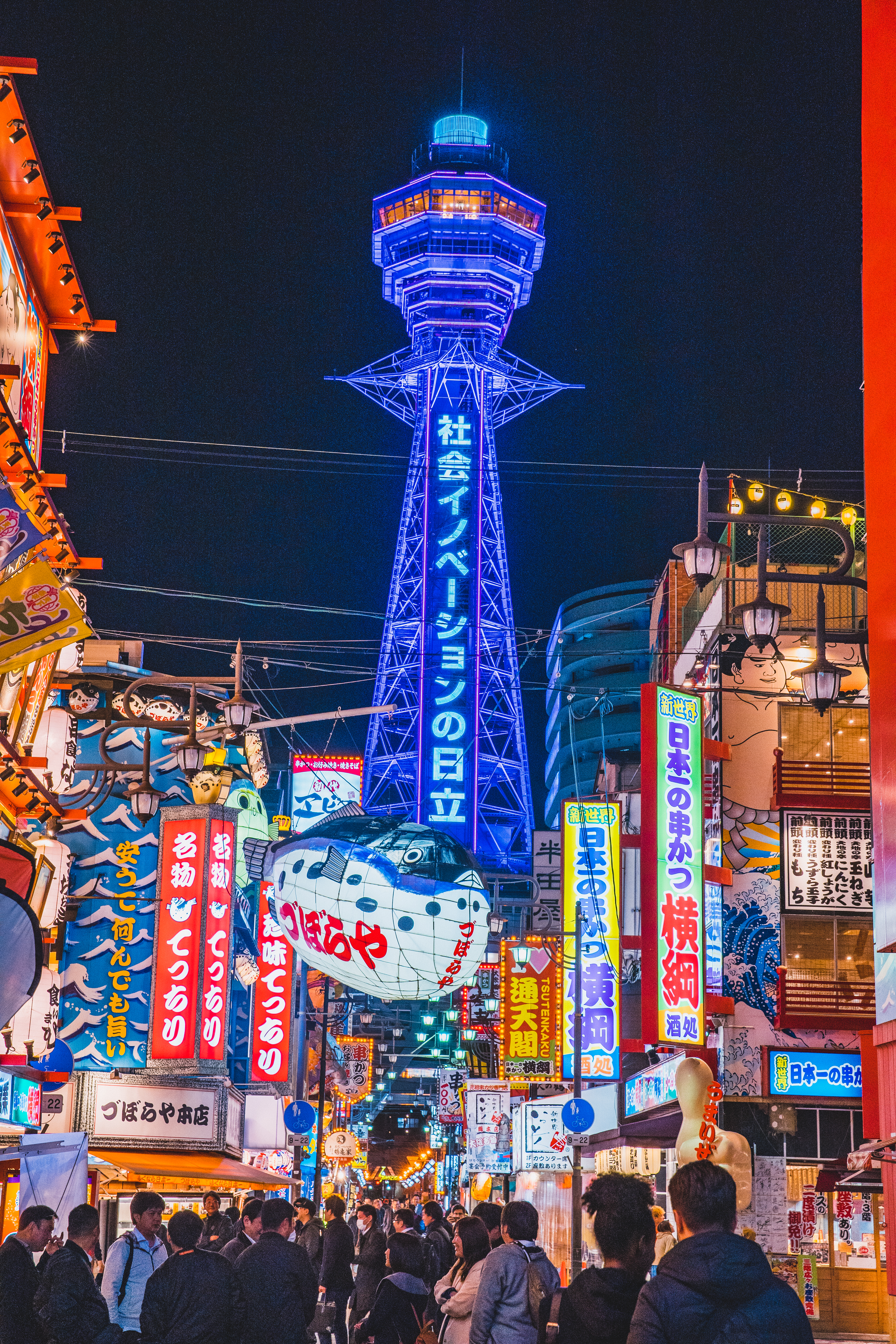
- Tsutenkaku Tower is a prominent landmark in Shinsekai
- Interactive map of Shinsekai
- Coordinates: 34°39′08″N 135°30′22″E
- Country: Japan
- City: Osaka
- Established: 1912

Shinsekai (新世界, lit. "New World"; pronounced [ɕĩɰ̃se̞ꜜka̠i]) is a neighbourhood located next to south Osaka City's downtown "Minami" area. The neighbourhood was created in 1912 with New York (specifically, Coney Island) as a model for its southern half and Paris for its northern half. At this location, a Luna Park amusement park operated from 1912 until it closed in 1923. The centrepiece of the neighbourhood was Tsutenkaku Tower (the "tower reaching to heaven").

It is located on the northern border of Nishinari, one of Japan's poorest areas.

== History and reputation ==
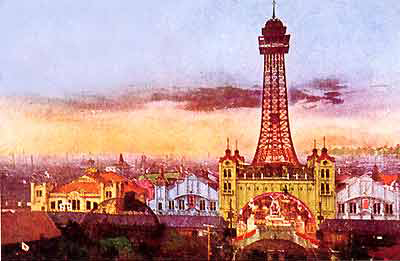
Original Tsutenkaku Tower, with Shinsekai Luna Park in the foreground, c. 1912

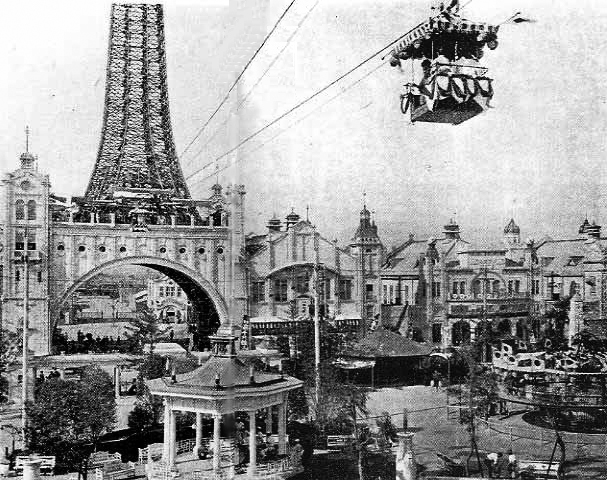
Aerial tramway connecting the original Tsutenkaku Tower with Luna Park, Osaka in Shinsekai, in the 1910s

At the beginning of the 20th century, the neighbourhood flourished as a local tourist attraction showcasing the city's modern image. After World War II, it served to entertain the laborers who were rebuilding Osaka. Shinsekai's sulphurous reputation owes to criminal activity that flourished there.

Continuing the area's chequered fortunes of recent years, Osaka's large permanent settlement of homeless has taken root in the areas around Shinsekai, most notably in Nishinari-ku just to the south of Shinsekai. Homeless men, often elderly, from all over Japan come to Nishinari-ku to escape the stigma of hometown societal shame and wander the streets around the area.

The neighbourhood is also close to Tobita, with a large presence of prostitutes and a concentration of Osaka's cross-dressing community.

=== Attractions ===
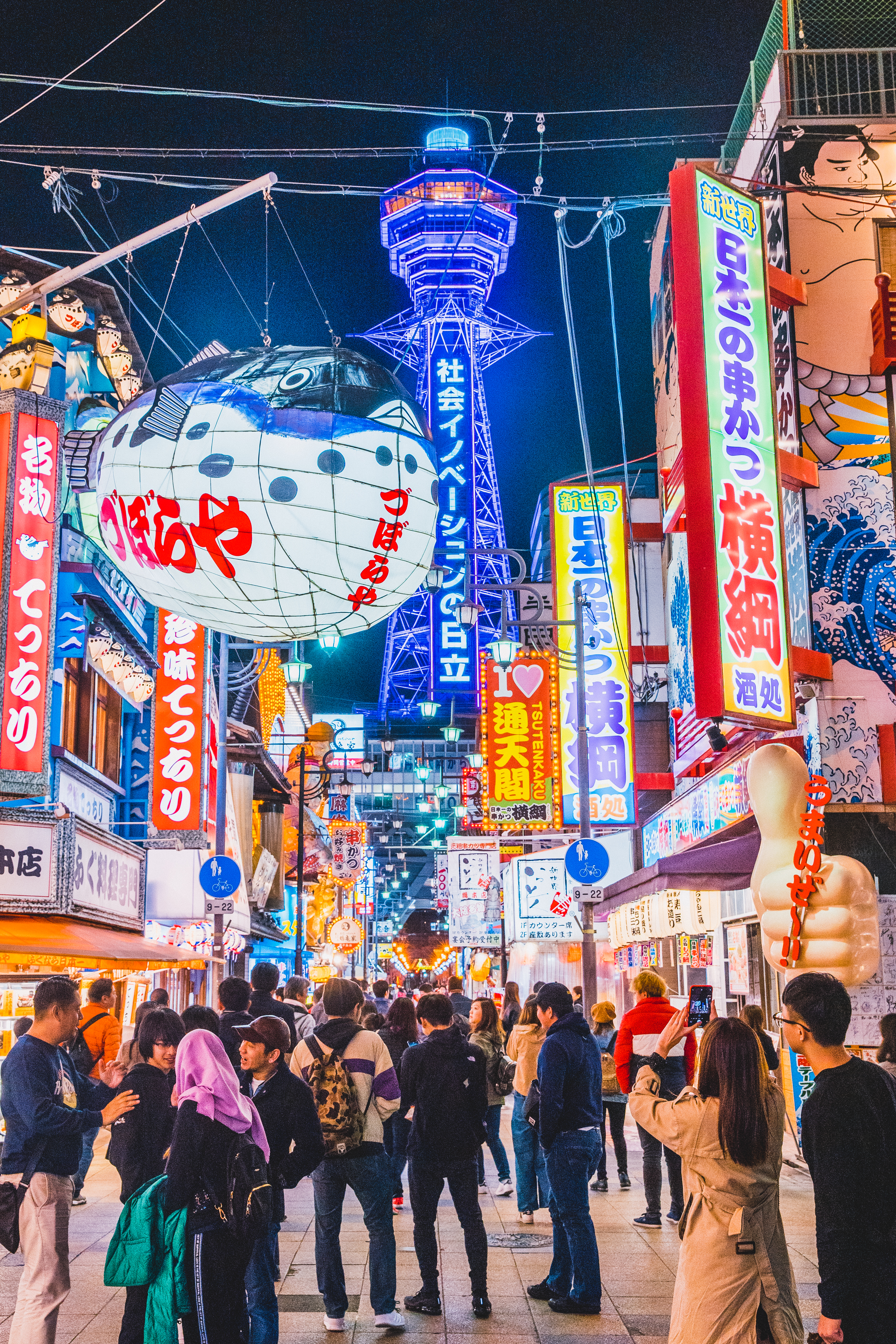
Lantern advertising fugu restaurant Zubora-ya in Shinsekai

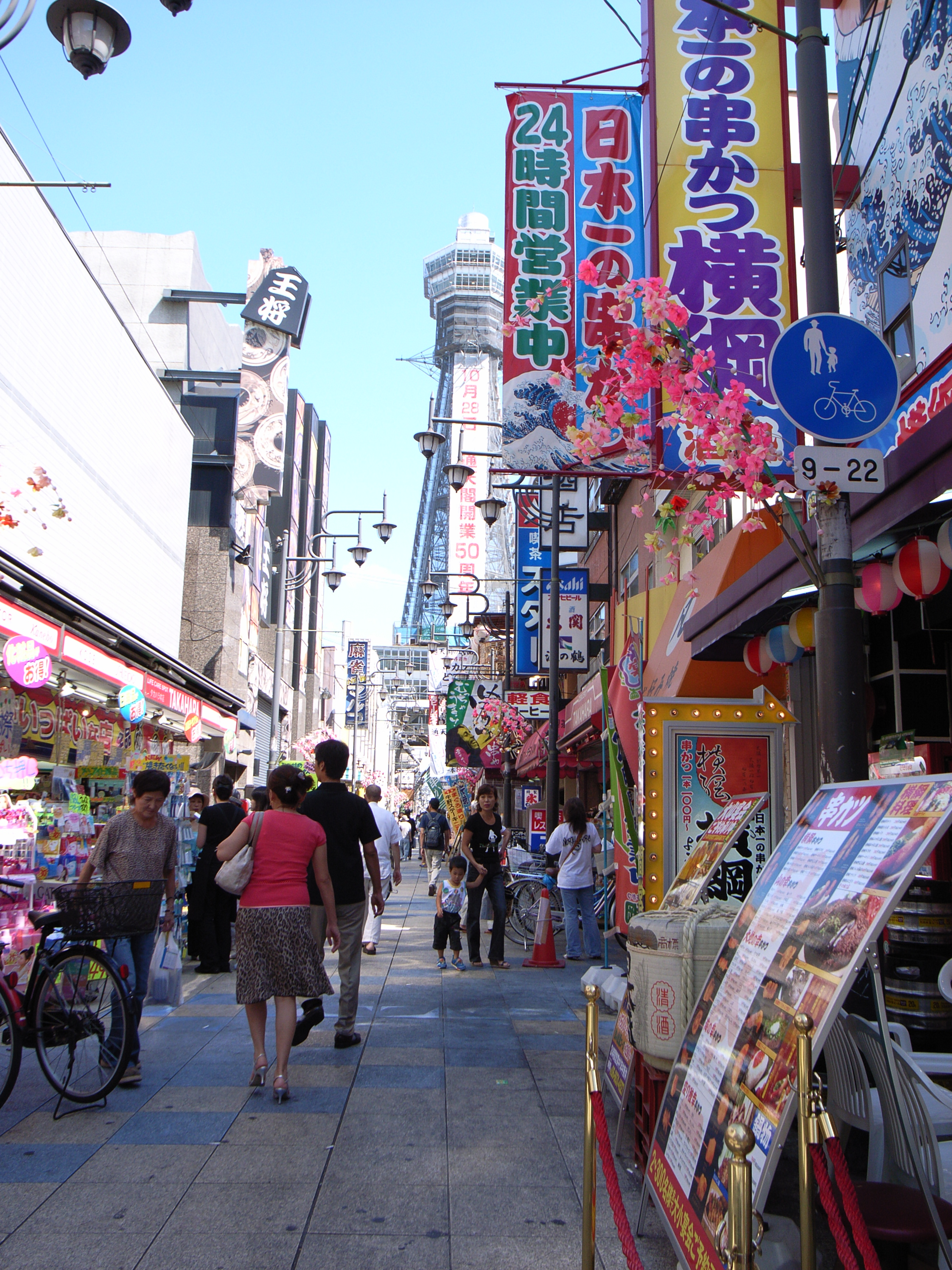
Shops in Shinsekai

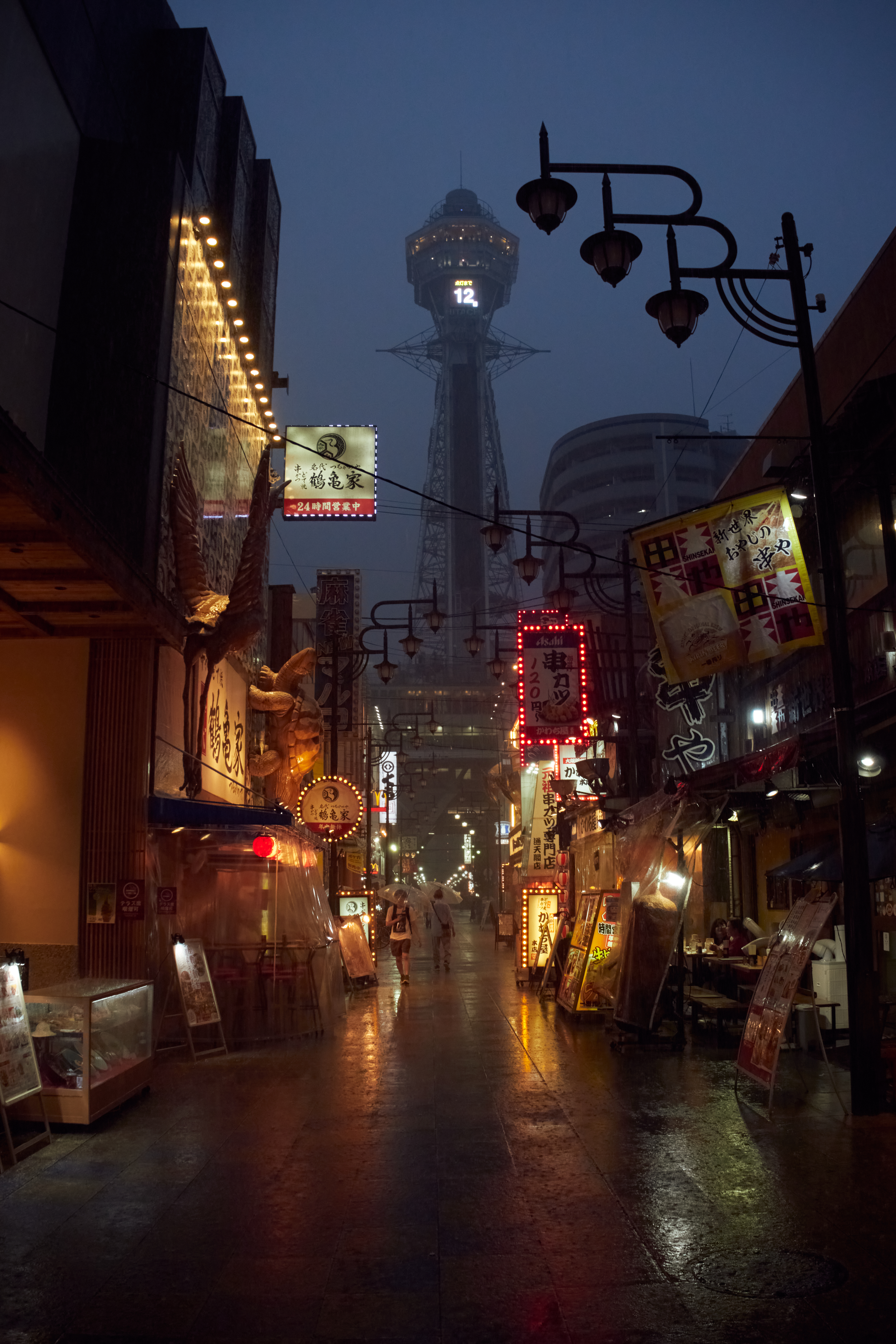
Shinsekai after rain

Shinsekai is the scene of low-cost restaurants, cheap clothing stores, cinemas, shogi and mahjong clubs, and pachinko parlours.

It has several fugu (blowfish) restaurants, but the neighbourhood's real culinary forte is kushi-katsu. The neighbourhood abounds with kushi-katsu restaurants offering various kinds of meat, fish, and vegetables all breaded and deep fried on small sticks for around ¥150 each.

Shinsekai lies west of Tennoji Zoo, Tennoji Park, and the Osaka Municipal Museum of Art. To the south is Spa World and the now-closed Festival Gate, a compact amusement park built to rejuvenate Osaka's most run-down area.

==== Tsutenkaku Tower ====
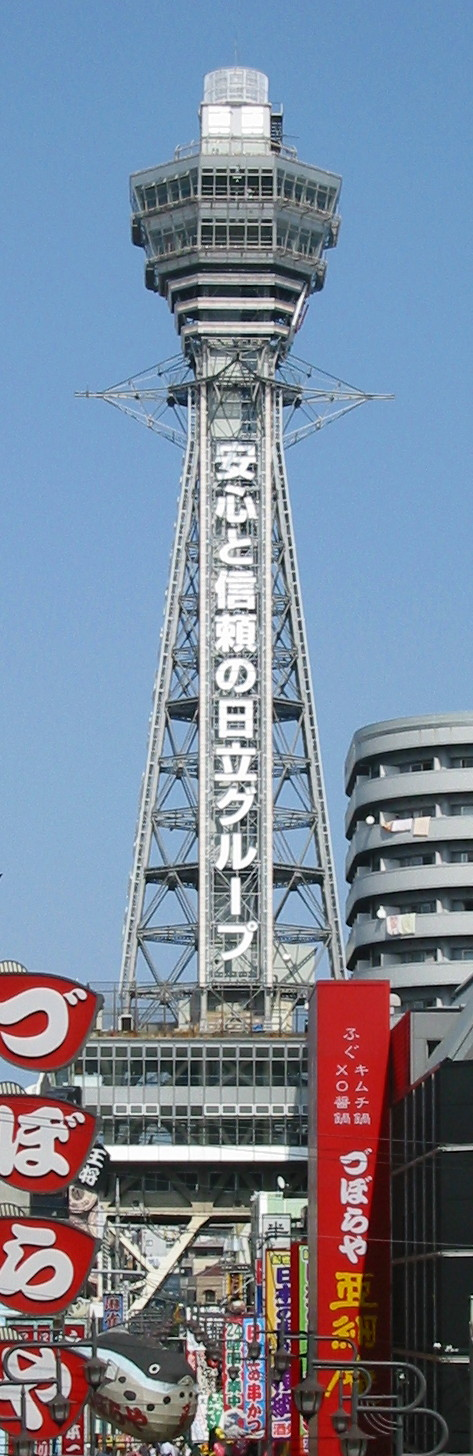
Tsūtenkaku, south side

The top of Tsutenkaku Tower provides a panoramic and unobstructed view of Osaka. The original Tsutenkaku Tower, completed in 1912 and 64 metres (210 ft) tall, was designed to resemble both the Eiffel Tower (at the top) and the Arc de Triomphe (at the base), and was one end of a tramway connecting the neighborhood with the Luna Park grounds. It was damaged by fire in 1943 and disassembled, then replaced in 1956 with the current structure, which is 103 m (338 ft) tall and designed by Tachū Naitō (also known for the design of Tokyo Tower).

== Access ==
- JR West Osaka Loop Line, Shin-Imamiya Station, East Exit (10-minute walk)
- Nankai Railway Nankai Line, Shin-Imamiya Station, East Exit (10-minute walk)
- Nankai Railway Koya Line, Shin-Imamiya Station, East Exit (10-minute walk)
- Osaka Municipal Subway Sakaisuji Line (brown line), Ebisucho Station, Exit 3 (3-minute walk)
- Osaka Municipal Subway Midosuji Line (red line), Dobutsuen-mae Station, Exit 5 (10-minute walk)
- Hankai Tramway Hankai Line, Ebisucho Station (3-minute walk)

== In popular culture ==
Shinsekai was used as a setting for NHK's 1996 drama series Futarikko.

== See also ==
- Tobita Shinchi
- Kamagasaki Day Laborers' District
