= Tsūtenkaku =

Observation tower in Osaka, Japan

Coordinates: 34°39′08″N 135°30′22″E

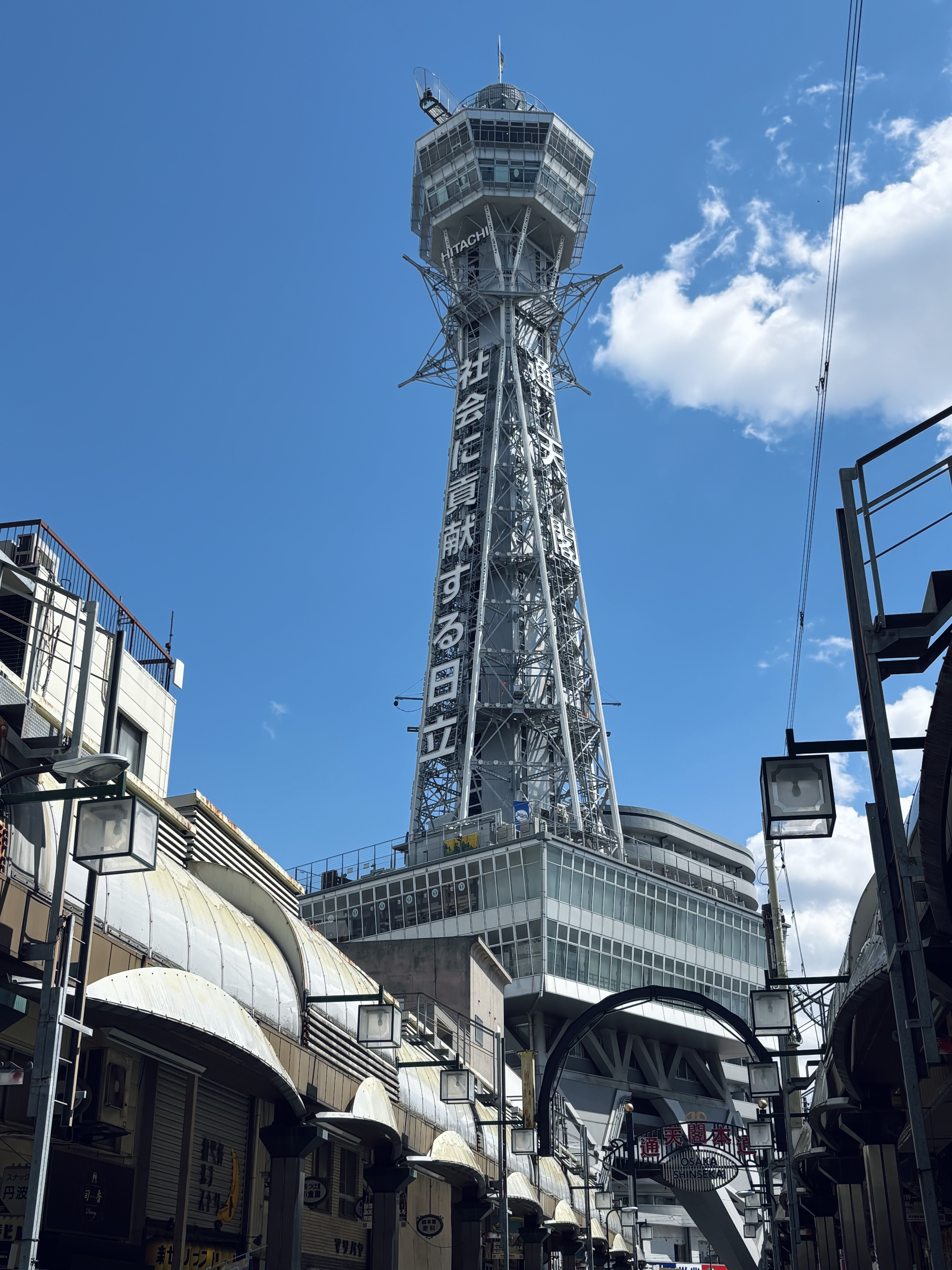
Tsūtenkaku

Tsūtenkaku (通天閣; lit. "Tower Reaching Heaven") is a tower and landmark of Osaka, Japan, and advertises the Hitachi company. It is located in the Shinsekai district of Naniwa-ku, Osaka. Its total height is 108 metres (354 ft); the main observation deck is at a height of 91 metres (299 ft). It is owned by Tsūtenkaku Kanko Co., Ltd. (通天閣観光株式会社, Tsūtenkaku Kankō Kabushiki-gaisha).

== History ==
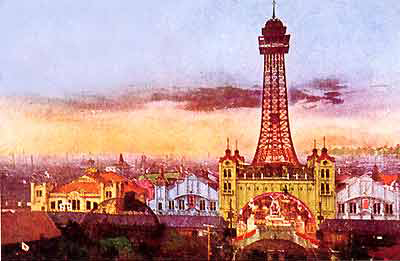
Shinsekai Luna Park, c. 1912

The current tower is the second to occupy the site. The original tower, patterned after the Eiffel Tower and the Arc de Triomphe, was built in 1912, and was connected to the adjacent amusement park, Luna Park, by an aerial cable car. At the time of its construction, its height of 64 metres (210 ft) made it the second tallest structure in Asia. It quickly became one of the most popular locations in the city, drawing visitors from all over the area. The original structure was severely damaged by a fire in 1943, and rather than being repaired, it was disassembled and the steel recycled for the war effort.

After World War II, citizens lobbied to rebuild the tower. A private company, the Tsūtenkaku Kanko Co. Ltd., was established, and Tachū Naitō, Japan's "Father of Towers" was selected to design it. The new, eight-sided structure was opened in 1956.

On the fifth floor observation deck is enshrined Billiken, the God of Happiness or "things as they ought to be". Billiken, a popular American charm doll that came to Japan in about 1910, was enshrined within Luna Park when it opened. When the park closed in 1923, the wooden statue of Billiken went missing. As a part of an effort to revive the tower, a copy of Billiken was made from an old photograph and placed inside the tower in 1979. The statue of Billiken became closely associated with the tower and is a popular symbol of good luck. Each year, thousands of visitors place a coin in his donation box and rub the soles of his feet to make their wishes come true.

Night picture of Tsūtenkaku in August, displaying red and blue colors. The weather beacon is lit up.

The tower is also known for its neon lights, which change every few years (they were shut off during the oil crisis of 1974–76). The neon lights have now been replaced by LED lighting, showing a different color set for every two months (e.g. pink for cherry blossom in March/April). Hitachi has sponsored the tower since 1957, and the light designs usually spell out Hitachi advertisements, although one side of the tower is usually occupied by a public service announcement. The lights on top of the tower are a weather beacon indicating the next day's weather forecast by a combination of different colors.

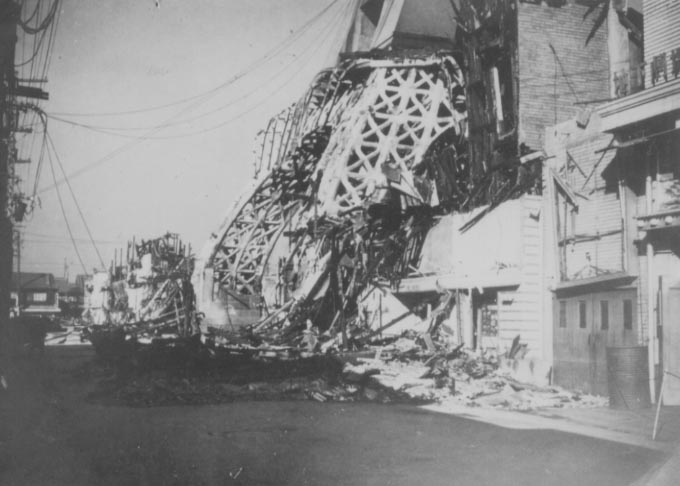
Fire damage to the original Tsūtenkaku tower in 1943

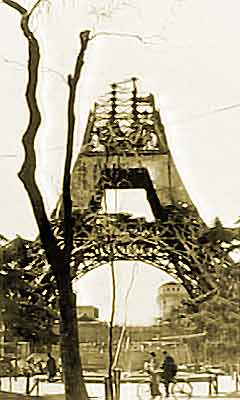
Demolition of the first Tsūtenkaku tower

== Access ==
- JR West, Osaka Loop Line and Yamatoji Line, Shin-Imamiya Station, East Exit (10-minute walk)
- Nankai Railway, Nankai Main Line and Koya Line, Shin-Imamiya Station, East Exit (10-minute walk)
- Osaka Municipal Subway Sakaisuji Line (brown line), Ebisuchō Station, Exit 3 (3-minute walk)
- Osaka Municipal Subway Midosuji Line (red line), Dobutsuen-mae Station, Exit 5 (10-minute walk)
- Hankai Tramway, Hankai Line, Ebisucho Station (3-minute walk)
