= The Wheel (charity) =

The Wheel (Irish: Rotha) is a support and representative network for the community and voluntary sector in Ireland. It is a charitable organisation, registered with the Charities Regulator in Ireland.

The Wheel is similar in nature to a number of UK councils for voluntary activity, including NCVO, SCVO, WCVA, and NICVA. It provides support services, advice and advocacy to individuals and organisations. It also undertakes research and surveys amongst its members, and organises conferences and events.

== External sites ==
- Official website
