= Naniwasuji Line =

Planned underground heavy rail line in central Osaka, Japan

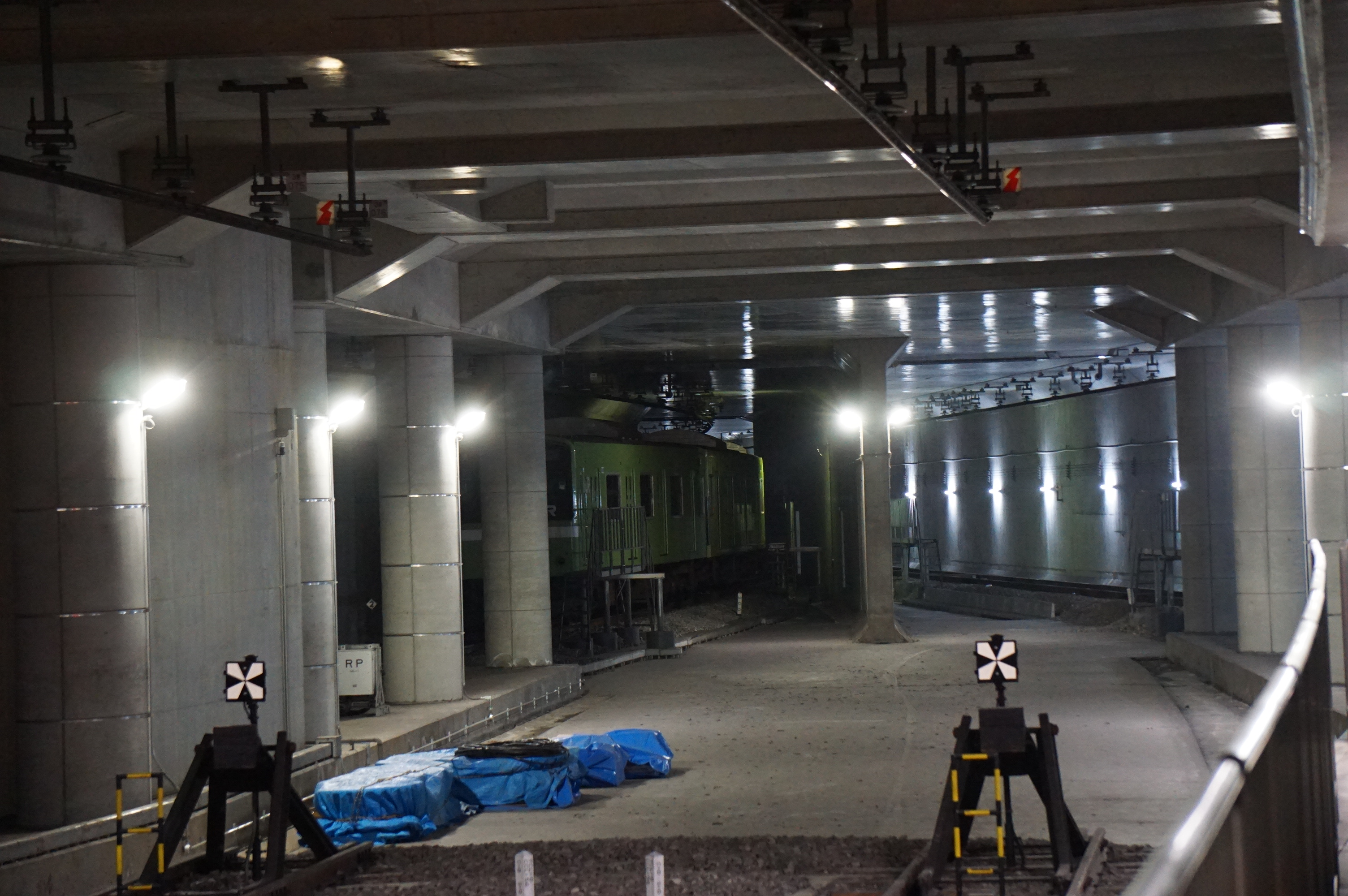
- Space at JR Namba Station reserved for the Naniwasuji Line

Overview
- Native name: なにわ筋線
- Status: Under construction
- Owner: Kansai Rapid Railway (Voluntary sector operator)
- Locale: Osaka
- Termini: Ōsaka Station (JR West) Shin-Ōsaka Station (Hankyu); JR Namba Station (JR West) Shin-Imamiya Station (Nankai)

Service
- Operator(s): JR West; Nankai Electric Railway; Hankyu Railway

History
- Planned opening: Spring 2031 (tentative)

Technical
- Line length: 7.2 km (4.5 mi)
- Num of tracks: 2
- Track gauge: 1,067 mm (3 ft 6 in)
- Electrification: 1,500 V DC, overhead lines
Route map
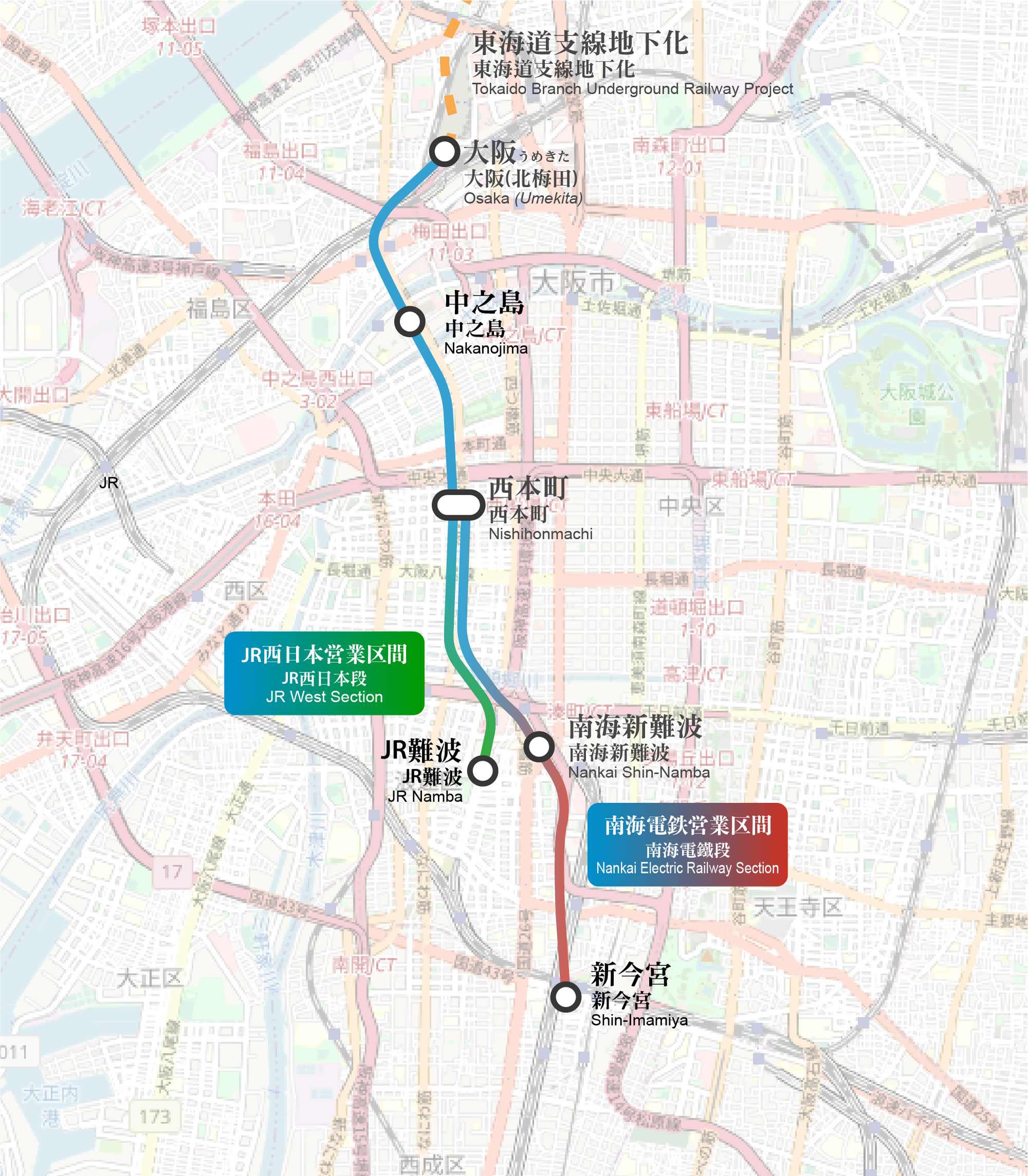

The Naniwasuji Line (なにわ筋線, Naniwasuji-sen) is an underground heavy rail line scheduled to open in the middle of 2031, which will run north-south through central Osaka, primarily under the avenue Naniwasuji. It has long been pursued by West Japan Railway Company (JR West) and Nankai Railway in order to connect the JR Yamatoji Line (Kansai Main Line) and Nankai Main Line with Shin-Osaka Station, greatly enhancing both companies' connections to Kansai International Airport and Wakayama Prefecture. As of 18 March 2023, the tracks through the northern terminus at Osaka Station and adjoining underground platforms were opened for the Haruka, Kuroshio, Mahoroba and Rakuraku Yamato limited express services as well as ordinary trains on the Osaka Higashi Line.

== Background ==
While both JR and Nankai operate trains to Wakayama (via the Hanwa Line and the Nankai Main Line, respectively) and to Kansai Airport (via the Kansai Airport Line and the Nankai Airport Line, respectively), neither route is ideal.

For JR, trains must use the Osaka Loop Line past Tennoji Station, both creating and being affected by delays on that line, and bypassing JR Namba Station in the Namba district, which is Osaka's major commercial centre. Additionally, until February 2023, the “Haruka” and “Kuroshio” trains from and to Kyoto and Shin-Osaka used the aboveground Umeda Freight Line, bypassing Osaka Station, the busiest station in western Japan, entirely. The connection to the Osaka Loop Line past the new Osaka Station underground platforms involves a single track shared trackage with JR Freight service, as well as a level junction crossing the Osaka Loop Line right before Nishikujō Station.

For Nankai, all trains go direct to its terminal at Namba Station, precluding access to points further north, including Umeda, Osaka, and Shin-Osaka stations.

The first proposals to alleviate the problems for both companies through the construction of a new underground line date back to 1982, with further proposals in 1989 (as an extension of the Yotsubashi Line to Shin-Osaka) and 2004 (as an underground heavy rail line). The line is intended to run primarily under the north-south thoroughfare Naniwasuji (hence the name), branching at its south end to connect both the Yamatoji Line (Kansai Main Line) terminal at JR Namba, and a Nankai line, with Shin-Osaka via a new underground route through what was then JR Freight's Umeda Freight Terminal. The Umeda portion of this plan was eventually incorporated into Phase II of the Osaka Higashi Line project (extension from Shin-Osaka to the underground platforms of Osaka Station), with provisions in place for eventual construction of the Naniwasuji Line itself.

Ridership on the line from the two companies is expected to reach approximately 240,000 people per day.

=== JR West ===
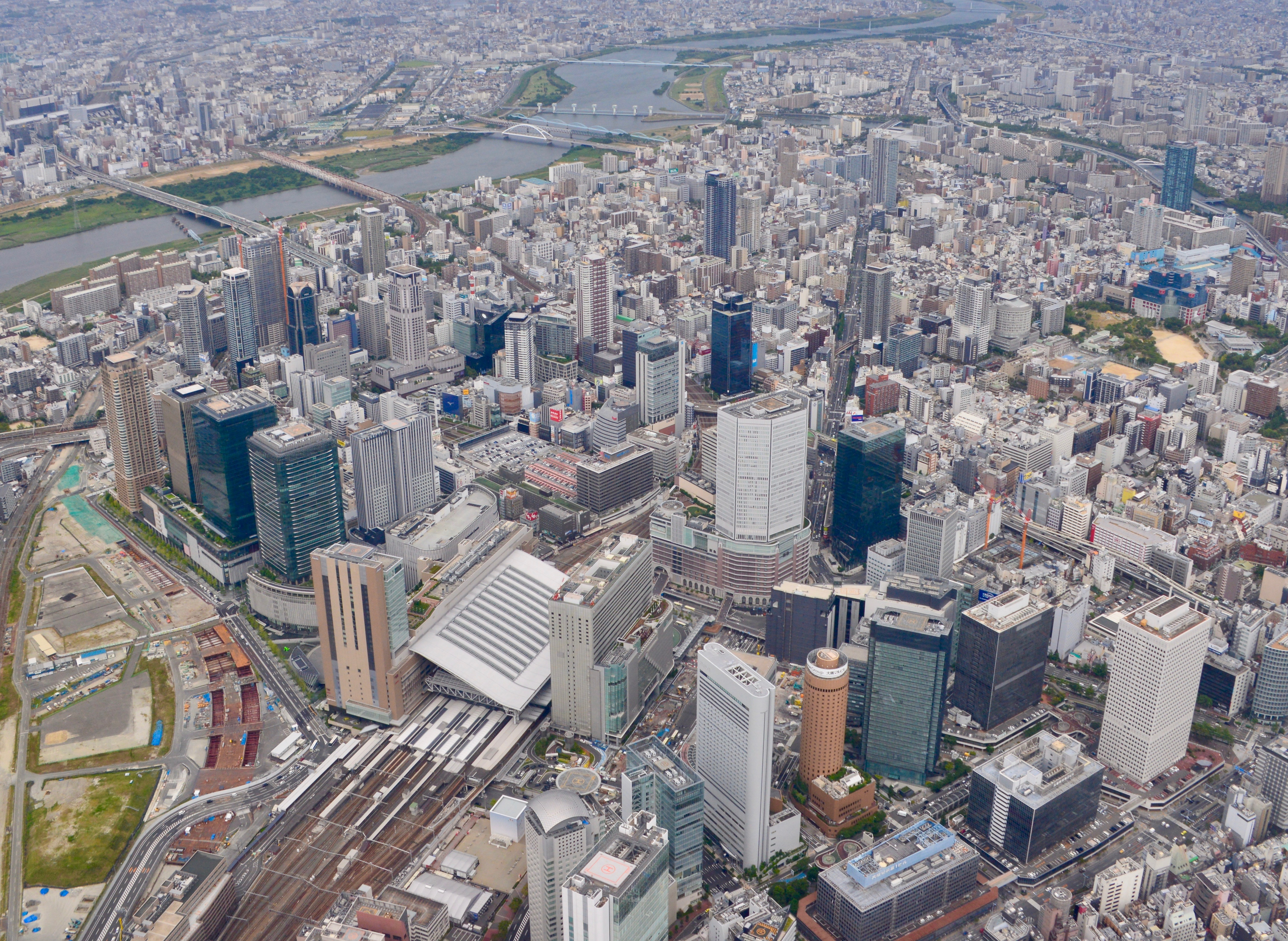
The underground platforms at Osaka Station (left) under construction in the Umeda district (14 August 2019)

The issue surrounding Osaka Station for JR was alleviated in fiscal 2022 with the opening of the first section (incorporated into the Osaka Higashi Line project, although construction delays have pushed its opening back four years compared to the rest of Phase II), which terminates at the underground platforms of Osaka Station on a route replacing the aboveground Umeda Freight Line. Without constructing an entirely new line through central Osaka, however, the other problems remain.

JR West is expected to be in charge of the section between Osaka Station and JR Namba Station.

=== Nankai Railway ===
Early plans for Nankai called for moving the Shiomibashi Line (the northern end of the Kōya Line) underground and connecting to the Naniwasuji Line via Shiomibashi Station (thus upgrading and increasing traffic on an otherwise lightly traveled, local route), but the company ultimately rejected this routing in favor of one via a new underground station at Namba.

=== Hankyu Railway ===
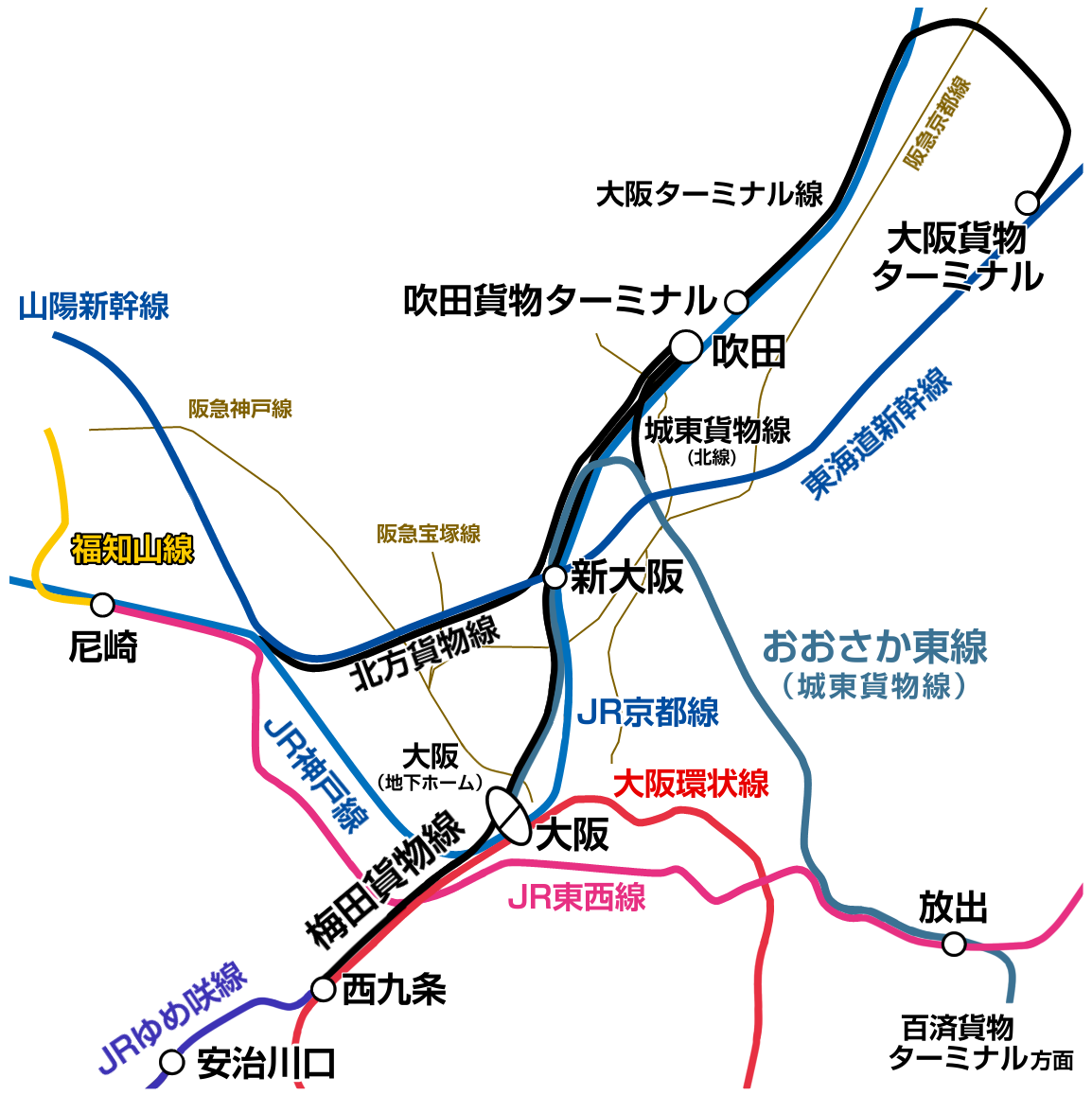
Map of the rail lines and freight terminals in northern Osaka: Haruka and Kuroshio run on the Umeda Freight Line (shown in black). The thinner lines represent Hankyu's commuter rail network, which bypasses Shin-Osaka Station.

Hankyu Railway has also announced tentative plans to build a new underground line connecting the Naniwasuji Line to Jūsō Station and another line from Jūsō to a Shin-Osaka Station of its own. The rail link from Osaka to Juso is called the Naniwasuji Link Line (ja:なにわ筋連絡線; Naniwasuji renraku-sen), and the rail link from Juso to Shin-Osaka is called the Hankyu Shin-Osaka Link Line (ja:阪急新大阪連絡線; Hankyu Shin-Osaka renraku-sen). On 27 December 2022, Yasuo Shimada, president of Hankyu Hanshin Holdings, said in an interview by the Sankei Shimbun that Hankyu would open both of these narrow-gauge lines at the same time as the Naniwasuji Line in 2031.

== History ==
On 9 July 2019, the railway business was approved by the Ministry of Land, Infrastructure, Transport and Tourism under the railway business act. Construction of the project was approved in February 2020.

In February 2023, track switching work took place between the 11th and the 13th of that month (including the decommissioning of the former Umeda Freight Line). Before then, JR passenger trains used a single-track freight spur from Osaka Station to join the Osaka Loop Line at Nishi-Kujō. Track switching was finished within the allotted timeframe and the Haruka and Kuroshio have since been using the new tracks.

The new underground platforms at Osaka Station opened for service on 18 March 2023.

=== Current plans ===
Current plans are to begin construction once the Osaka Higashi Line opens to Osaka Station, with completion anticipated in the middle of 2031. Total construction costs, including provisions for the line at Kita-Umeda, are projected to total 330 billion yen.

== Stations ==
JR	Nankai Hankyu	Station	Japanese	Transfers	Location
(none)	▲	Shin-Ōsaka	新大阪駅	Tokaido Shinkansen; San'yō Shinkansen; JR Kyōto Line (JR-A46); Osaka Higashi Line (JR-F02); Midōsuji Line (M13)	Yodogawa-ku
(none)	▲	Jūsō	十三	Kōbe Main Line (HK-03); Kyōto Main Line (HK-03); Takarazuka Main Line (HK-03)	Yodogawa-ku
Through services from Osaka: JR Kyoto Line, Osaka Higashi Line
●	●	Osaka	大阪	JR Kōbe Line (JR-A47); JR Kyōto Line (JR-A47); JR Takarazuka Line (JR-G47); Osaka Loop Line (JR-O11); Osaka Higashi Line (JR-F01); JR Tōzai Line (Kitashinchi: JR-H44); Kōbe Main Line (Osaka-Umeda: HK-01); Kyōto Main Line (Osaka-Umeda: HK-01); Takarazuka Main Line (Osaka-Umeda: HK-01); Main Line (Osaka-Umeda: HS01); Midōsuji Line (Umeda: M16); Tanimachi Line (Higashi-Umeda: T20); Yotsubashi Line (Nishi-Umeda: Y11)	Kita-ku (North District)
●	●	Nakanoshima	中之島	Nakanoshima Line (KH-54)	Kita-ku (North District)
●	●	Nishi-Hommachi	西本町	Hommachi: Midōsuji Line (M18) Chūō Line (C16) Yotsubashi Line (Y13)	Nishi-ku (West District)
●	｜	JR Namba	JR難波	Yamatoji Line (JR-Q17); Namba: Kintetsu Namba Line (A01) Hanshin Namba Line (HS41) Midōsuji Line (M20) Sennichimae Line (S16) Yotsubashi Line (Y15)	Naniwa-ku
｜	●	Nankai Shin-Namba	南海新難波	Yamatoji Line (JR-Q17); Namba: Kintetsu Namba Line (A01) Hanshin Namba Line (HS41) Midōsuji Line (M20) Sennichimae Line (S16) Yotsubashi Line (Y15)	Naniwa-ku
●	●	Shin-Imamiya	新今宮	Osaka Loop Line (JR-O19); Yamatoji Line (JR-Q19); Nankai Main Line (NK03); Kōya Line (NK03); Hankai Line (Minami-Kasumichō: HN52); Dōbutsuen-mae: Midōsuji Line (M22) Sakaisuji Line (K19)	Nishinari-ku
Through services: Yamatoji Line, Hanwa Line, and Kansai Airport Line (from JR Namba) Nankai Main Line and Nankai Koya Line (from Shin-Imamiya)

== See also ==
- JR Tozai Line, east-west underground rail line opened in 1997 linking JR Kobe Line with Katamachi Line
- Elizabeth line
- Line RER A
