= Sarah Elliott =

Sarah Elliott may refer to:

- Sarah Barnwell Elliott (1848–1928), American novelist
- Sarah Elliott (cricketer) (born 1982), Australian cricket player
- Sarah Elliott (charity manager) (born 1982), British charity manager
