= FRSB =

FRSB may refer to:

- the Financial Reporting Standards Board, in New Zealand
- a Fellow of the Royal Society of Biology, in the United Kingdom
- Fundraising Standards Board, the independent regulator for charity fundraising in the UK since 2007
