= Fundraising Regulator =

Independent regulator for charity fundraising in the UK

- Predecessor: Fundraising Standards Board (FRSB)
- Formation: 7 July 2016; 10 years ago
- Type: Registered Company
- Purpose: Regulation of fundraising
- Headquarters: 50 Featherstone Street London EC1Y 8RT
- Location: London, England
- Key people: Gerald Oppenheim (CEO)
- Website: www.fundraisingregulator.org.uk

The Fundraising Regulator is the independent regulator of charitable fundraising in England, Wales and Northern Ireland.

It was established on 7 July 2016, replacing the Fundraising Standards Board (FRSB). The Regulator developed from recommendations made by the cross-party Review of fundraising regulation chaired by Sir Stuart Etherington in September 2015.

Fundraising by charities only registered in Scotland is regulated by the Scottish Fundraising Standards Panel.

== Regulatory activities ==
=== Levy and registration ===
The Fundraising Regulator is funded through a voluntary levy on charities spending £100,000 or more each year on fundraising. Other charities outside the levy can register to demonstrate their commitment to the fundraising standards by paying an administrative charge of £50 a year.

From March 2018, charities in Northern Ireland were able to register with the Fundraising Regulator.

In March 2019, the Fundraising Regulator announced it was changing the way it collects its levy. The changes came into effect in September 2019.

=== The Code of Fundraising Practice ===
The Code of Fundraising Practice sets the standards that apply to fundraising carried out by all charitable institutions and third-party fundraisers in the UK.

The code was originally developed in 2005 by the Institute of Fundraising. The cross-party Review recommended responsibility for the code be transferred to the new Fundraising Regulator.

==== Amendments to the code ====
In October 2017 the Fundraising Regulator amended the code to give more privacy to volunteers who deal with static collection boxes.

A consultation on proposed changes to the code regarding data protection ran from October 2017 to December 2017.

In June 2018 new standards were introduced for online fundraising platforms.

A consultation aimed at improving the accessibility of the code ran from 10 September 2018 to 16 November 2018. On 6 June 2019 the Fundraising Regulator published an updated version of the code which came into effect on 1 October 2019.

=== Complaints ===
The Fundraising Regulator investigates complaints about fundraising where these cannot be resolved by the organizations themselves. It does so by considering whether the fundraising organization has complied with the code. It deals with complaints about fundraising in England, Wales and Northern Ireland, and fundraising in Scotland where it is carried out by charities registered primarily with the Charity Commission for England and Wales or the Charity Commission for Northern Ireland.

In October 2018 the Board of the Fundraising Regulator decided to name organizations it investigated from 1 March 2019. The first set of 10 named investigation summaries was issued in September 2019.

=== Fundraising Preference Service ===
The Fundraising Preference Service (FPS) is a service run by the Fundraising Regulator that allows members of the public to request charities stop contacting them by email, telephone, post and/or text message with fundraising requests. People can make a request on behalf of someone else if they have their authority to do so.

The FPS launched on 6 July 2017. In January 2018 the Fundraising Regulator announced a Welsh language version of the FPS.

In March 2019 the Fundraising Regulator named for the first-time charities it was acting against for breaching the FPS. It also announced charities would have 21 days to act on suppression requests made through the FPS.

At its annual meeting in November 2019 the Fundraising Regulator announced a formal review of the FPS to be conducted in 2020.

== Structure ==
The Fundraising Regulator is a company limited by guarantee (No.10016446) in England and Wales and is governed by a non-executive board of directors.

In July 2018, Gerald Oppenheim replaced Stephen Dunmore as Chief Executive of the Fundraising Regulator.

On 1 January 2019, Lord Toby Harris succeeded Lord Grade as Chair of the Fundraising Regulator.

== History of fundraising regulation ==
=== Fundraising Standards Board ===
The Fundraising Standards Board (FRSB) was established in 2007 as the independent self-regulatory scheme for fundraising in the UK. The FRSB regulated charity compliance with standards applying to different types of fundraising activity in England and Wales set out in a Code of Fundraising Practice compiled by the Institute of Fundraising. The Fundraising Regulator replaced the FRSB following the review of fundraising self-regulation in 2015. The FRSB announced its closure on 10 November 2016.

=== Public Fundraising Regulatory Association (PFRA) ===
The Public Fundraising Regulatory Association oversaw door to door and street fundraising where a fundraiser asks someone to make a regular donation to a charity by direct debit. The Fundraising Regulator assumed the PFRA's regulatory powers following the review of fundraising self-regulation in 2015. The PFRA merged with the Institute of Fundraising in August 2016.

=== Review of the Charities Act 2006 ===
In 2011, the UK government appointed Lord Hodgson to conduct a review of the Charities Act 2006. The review identified that the self-regulatory system of fundraising in the UK was “confused” with three bodies involved; the Institute of Fundraising, the FRSB and the PFRA.

=== Review of fundraising self-regulation ===
Former Chief Executive of the National Council for Voluntary Organisations (NCVO) Sir Stuart Etherington chaired a review into the self-regulation of charity fundraising in 2015 with a cross-party review panel of three peers; Lord Leigh of Hurley, Baroness Pitkeathley and Lord Wallace of Saltaire.

The review recommended:

- replacing the FRSB with a new fundraising regulator
- that fundraising regulation remains self-regulatory
- that charity leaders take more responsibility for fundraising activities
- that responsibility for the Code of Fundraising Practice should be transferred from the Institute of Fundraising to the new regulator
- that the regulatory responsibilities of the PFRA should transfer to the new regulator
- the creation of a fundraising preference service that allows people to opt out of charity appeals.
