= Moves management =

Moves management is a term used primarily with the non-profit sector in relationship to donor development. It refers to the process by which a prospective donor is moved from cultivation to solicitation. “Moves” are the actions an organization takes to bring in donors, establish relationships, and renew contributions. David Dunlop, the Cornell University senior development officer who developed the concept of moves management, described the idea as “changing people’s attitudes so they want to give.”

== Implementation ==
An organization implementing moves management should have a system of policies, procedures, and practices that direct the actions of the organization towards bringing in donors, forging relationships, and generating major gifts. These systems should be focused on donors, rather than donations. They should also emphasize documenting the relationship between the donor and the organization.

== Information Tracked ==
Moves management requires a baseline of personally identifiable information for each donor. Because moves management attempts to leverage personal relationships with donors, an organization should be tracking the following:

- Donor's biographical information
- Donor's actions
- Donor's interests
- Donor's relationships
- Donor's giving history

Using this data and any other additional information in your information tracking system is the foundation for enhancing donor communication and improving solicitation strategies under the moves management philosophy.

== Social Data ==
Moves management’s heavy focus on donor relationships has led to social data transforming the way organizations are able to interact with donors. Organizations have primarily begun incorporating social data into their moves management strategies in two ways: prospecting and engagement.

=== Prospecting Uses ===
The donor prospecting phase has been enhanced through the ability of constituent relationship management (CRM) technology to import social data. This data also helps inform solicitation strategies, pipeline management, and overall outreach execution for the entire organization.

=== Engagement Uses ===
Donor engagement has benefitted from the use of social data by providing development officers with additional methods of communication. The variety of ways that social media is disseminated has created. CRM software is commonly used to parse the large quantities of social data to turn it into something that is actionable for development officers who are reaching out and nurturing donor relationships.
