= Stuart Etherington =

British charity executive and former social worker (born 1955)

Sir Stuart Etherington FRSA
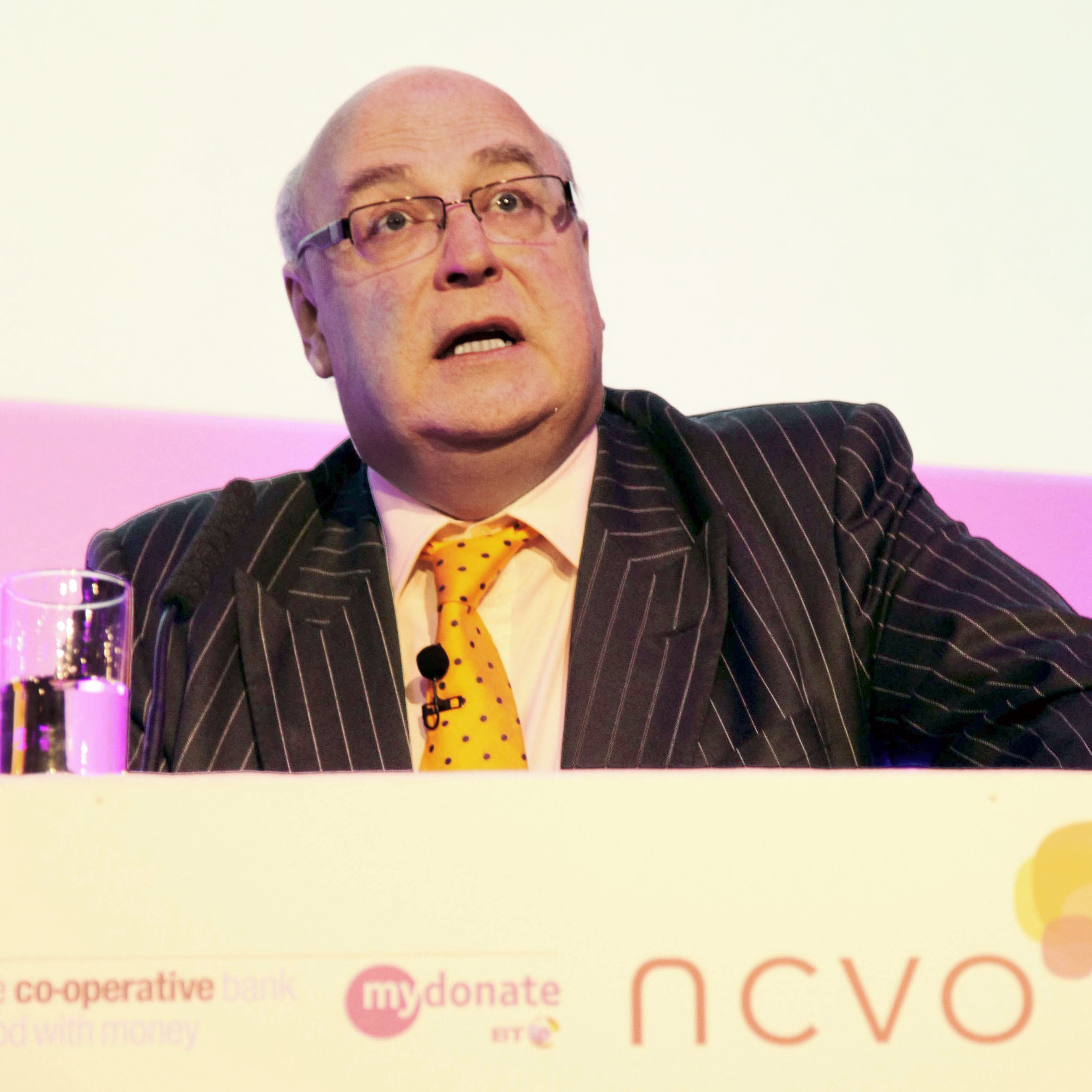
- Etherington speaking at the NCVO Annual Conference in 2012.

Chief executive of the National Council for Voluntary Organisations
- In office 1 February 1994 – 1 January 2020
- Preceded by: Judy Weleminsky
- Succeeded by: Karl Wilding

Personal details
- Born: Stuart James Etherington; 26 February 1955 (age 71) Epsom, Surrey, England
- Citizenship: United Kingdom
- Education: Brunel University; University of Essex; School of Oriental and African Studies, University of London; London Business School, University of London
- Awards: Knight Bachelor (2010)

Sir Stuart James Etherington (born 26 February 1955) is a British charity executive and former social worker. From 1994 to 2020, he was chief executive of the National Council for Voluntary Organisations, with the membership base increasing from 400 to over 14,000. He was previously the chief executive of the Royal National Institute for Deaf People. He received a knighthood in 2010 in recognition of his work for the voluntary and community sectors.

He is now the Chair of the Oversight Trust, Chair of the National Centre for Social Research (NatCen) and chair of the advisory board of the Centre for Charity Effectiveness. He is also the Honorary Visiting professor at the Business School in the Centre for Charity Effectiveness.

He has more recently become Freeman of the City of London and Liveryman of the Worshipful Company of Glaziers and Painters of Glass in 2021.

== Early life and education ==
Etherington was born on 26 February 1955 in Epsom, Surrey, England and brought up in Mickleham, Surrey. He was educated at Sondes Place School, an all boys secondary modern in Dorking, Surrey.

Etherington has a number of university degrees. He studied politics at Brunel University and graduated with a Bachelor of Science (BSc) degree in 1977. He has a Master of Arts (MA) degree in social service planning from the University of Essex, and a MA degree in international relations and diplomacy from the School of Oriental and African Studies, University of London. He also has a Master of Business Administration (MBA) degree from the London Business School, University of London.

He has been awarded honorary doctorates from both Greenwich and Brunel University.

He is currently studying classics, Philosophy and History of Art with City Lit and the Open University.

== Career ==
Etherington began his career as a social worker. He worked in that field between 1977 and 1979, and was based in London Borough of Hillingdon. Then, from 1980 to 1983, he was a researcher for a housing trust. From 1983 to 1985, he worked as a policy advisor to the British Association of Social Workers. He spent the next two years as Director of Good Practices in Mental Health, a small mental health charity.

In 1987, Etherington joined the Royal National Institute for Deaf People (RNID) as its Director of Public Affairs. In 1991, he was appoint Chief executive of the RNID; he was aged 35. On 1 February 1994, he moved to become Chief Executive of the National Council for Voluntary Organisations (NCVO).

From 2002 to 2006, Etherington was a member of the University Court of the Open University. From 2008 to 2013, he was a Pro-Chancellor and the Chair of Court of the University of Greenwich.

Etherington was a member of the Economic and Social Committee of the European Union and the Chair of London United. He was also previously the chair of the trustees of the Patron's Fund and chaired a cross party review looking at the structure of the regulation of fundraising.

He has been a trustee of Business in the Community, the chair of the BBC Appeals Advisory Committee, a member of the Community and Social Affairs Committee of Barclays Bank, former chair of Guidestar UK, treasurer of CIVICUS and chair of CIVICUS Europe, council member of the Institute of Employment Studies, an advisory group member for the Policy Centre at the British Academy and for the Lord Mayor's Trust Initiative.

His government appointments have included the Prime Minister's Delivery Unit. He has also served on the Cabinet Office Performance and Innovation Unit's advisory board on the Voluntary Sector and HM Treasury's Cross Cutting Review on the role of the voluntary sector.

In 2017, he authored a report, Voluntary Action: A Way Forward, which included an extensive range of recommendations for the future of civil society.

== Honours ==
In the 2010 Queen's Birthday Honours, Etherington was appointed a Knight Bachelor "for services to the Third Sector". He was invested by Anne, Princess Royal (on behalf of Queen Elizabeth II) during a ceremony held at Buckingham Palace on 25 November 2010.

In July 2000, Etherington was awarded an honorary Doctor of Science (DSc) degree by Brunel University. In 2014, he was awarded an honorary Doctor of the University (DUniv) degree by the University of Greenwich "in recognition of his commitment to higher education and to the work of the university over the past decade".

Etherington is an elected Fellow of the Royal Society of Arts (FRSA). He is an Honorary Fellow of the Institute for Employment Studies.
