= Nankai Shin-Namba Station =

Station in Osaka, Honshu, Japan

Nankai Shin-Namba Station 南海新難波駅
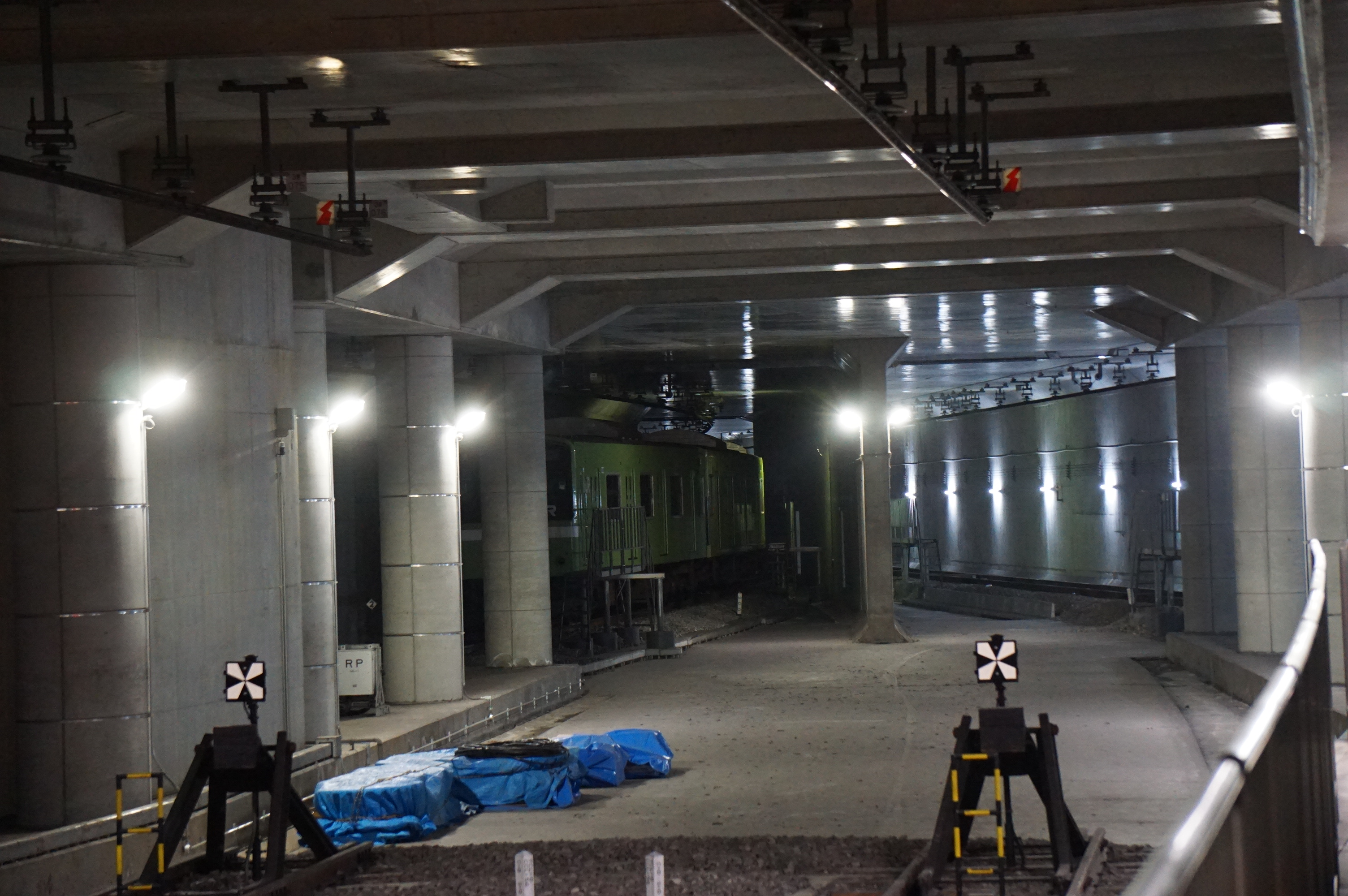
- Space at the connected JR Namba Station, reserved for the Naniwasuji Line

General information
- Location: 1-5 Namba, Naniwa-ku, Osaka
- Coordinates: 34°39′56.70″N 135°29′56.04″E
- Operator: West Japan Railway Company; Nankai Electric Railway
- Line: Naniwasuji Line
- Platforms: 2 side platforms
- Tracks: 2
- Connections: M 20 S 16 Y 15 Namba Station ■A01 ■HS 41 Osaka-Namba Station

Other information
- Status: Under construction

History
- Opening: 2031; 5 years' time
Location

Nankai Shin-Namba Station (Japanese: 南海新難波駅, Hepburn: Nankai-Shin-Nanba-eki) is a station located in Namba, Naniwa-ku, Osaka. It is a station on the upcoming Naniwasuji Line that will be jointly operated by the West Japan Railway Company (JR West) and Nankai Electric Railway.

== Structural layout ==
The station is located after the Nishi-Hommachi junction point for the branches of the Naniwasuji Line, the other branch dedicated to JR Namba Station. It has 2 side platforms serving both tracks in each direction on the upcoming Naniwasuji Line. The construction of this station involved the cut-and-cover method, which meant several buildings near the station had to be demolished. The following station would be Shin-Imamiya Station.

== History ==
On 10 July 2019, the Ministry of Land, Infrastructure, Transport and Tourism issued the railway business license for the Naniwasuji Line. The construction was approved in 2020, and the expansion and renovation projects of several other stations were completed by 2023.

The total project cost increased from the initial projection of 329.1 billion yen to 642.5 billion yen due to rising construction material costs and labor expenses. The figure was slightly adjusted down from an intermediate peak projection of 650 billion yen by the Kansai Rapid Railway due to optimized underground structural methods, with Osaka Prefecture and Osaka City each projecting a municipal contribution of 114.6 billion yen. Municipal risk management assessments deemed the project's continuation valid as its re-evaluated Benefit-Cost (B/C) ratio landed at 1.05, surpassing the mandatory threshold.

The station is due to open in mid-2031, when the Naniwasuji Line opens.
