= Mansfield Place Church =

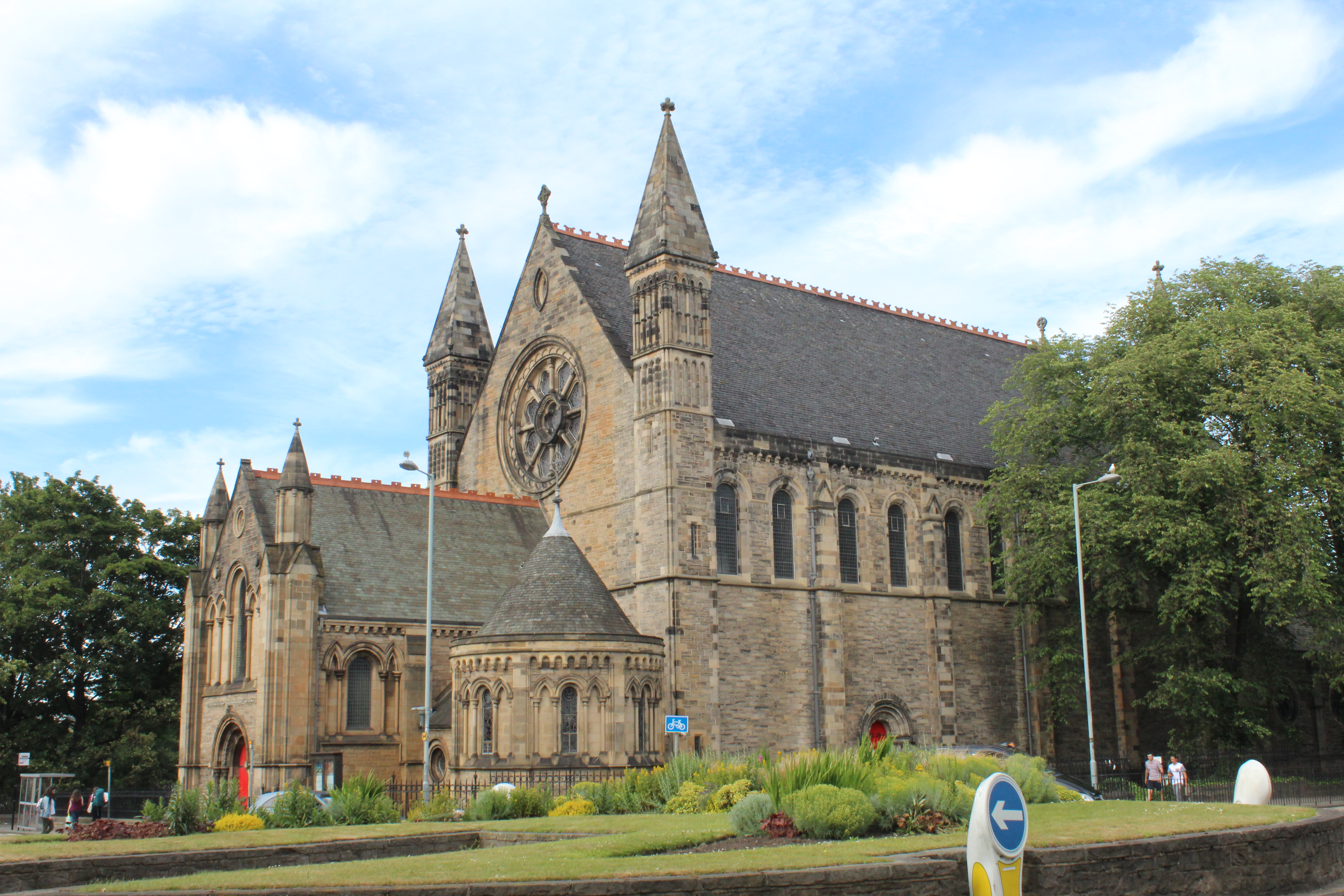
- Mansfield Place Church
- Location: Edinburgh
- Country: Scotland

History
- Founded: 1876

Architecture
- Style: Romanesque Revival architecture

Mansfield Place Church is a church in Edinburgh. The Scottish neo-Romanseque building was designed by Sir Robert Rowand Anderson and completed in 1885. Now called the Mansfield Traquair Centre, it is located on Mansfield Place at the foot of Broughton Street.

== History ==
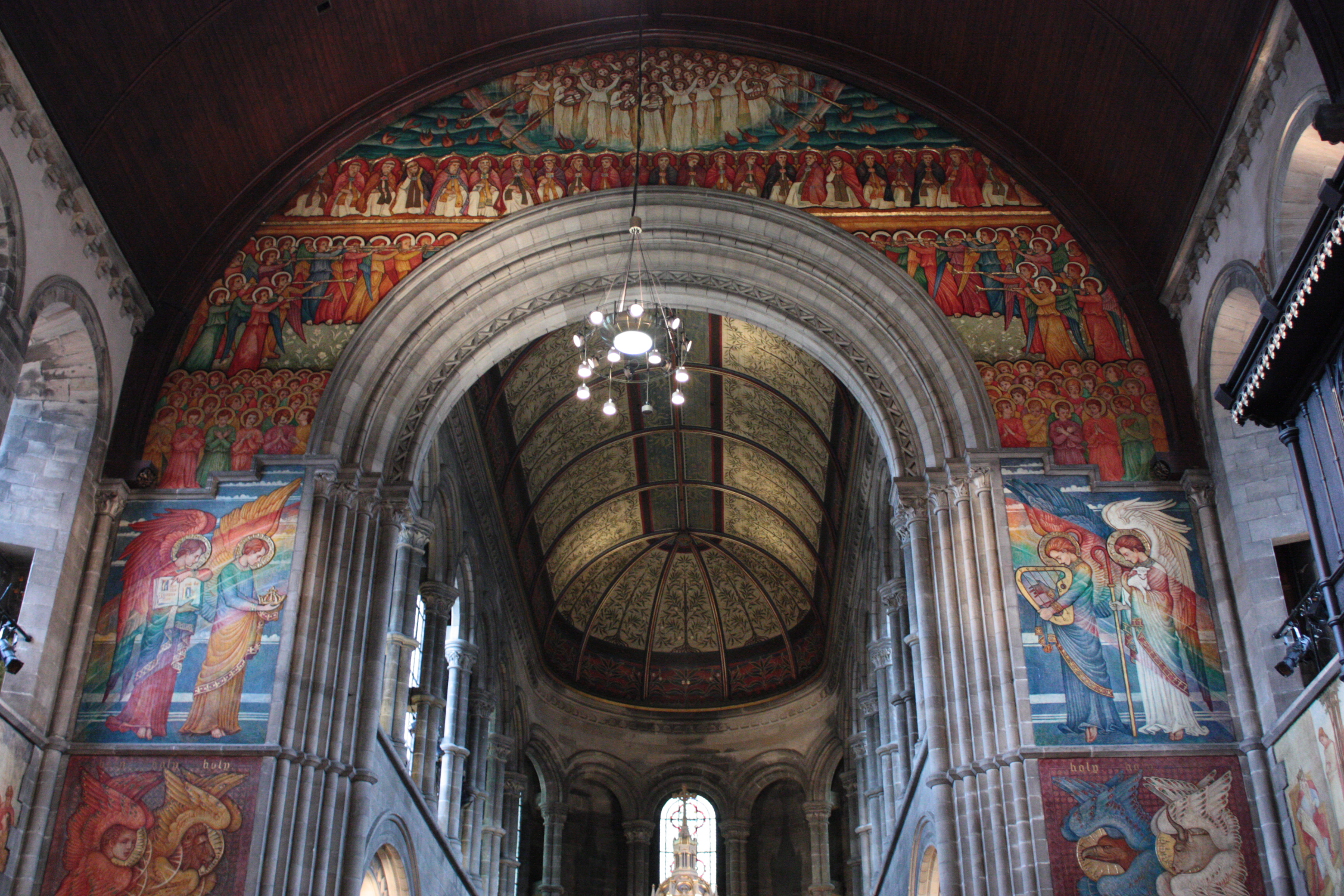
Catholic Apostolic Church murals, Edinburgh (east end)

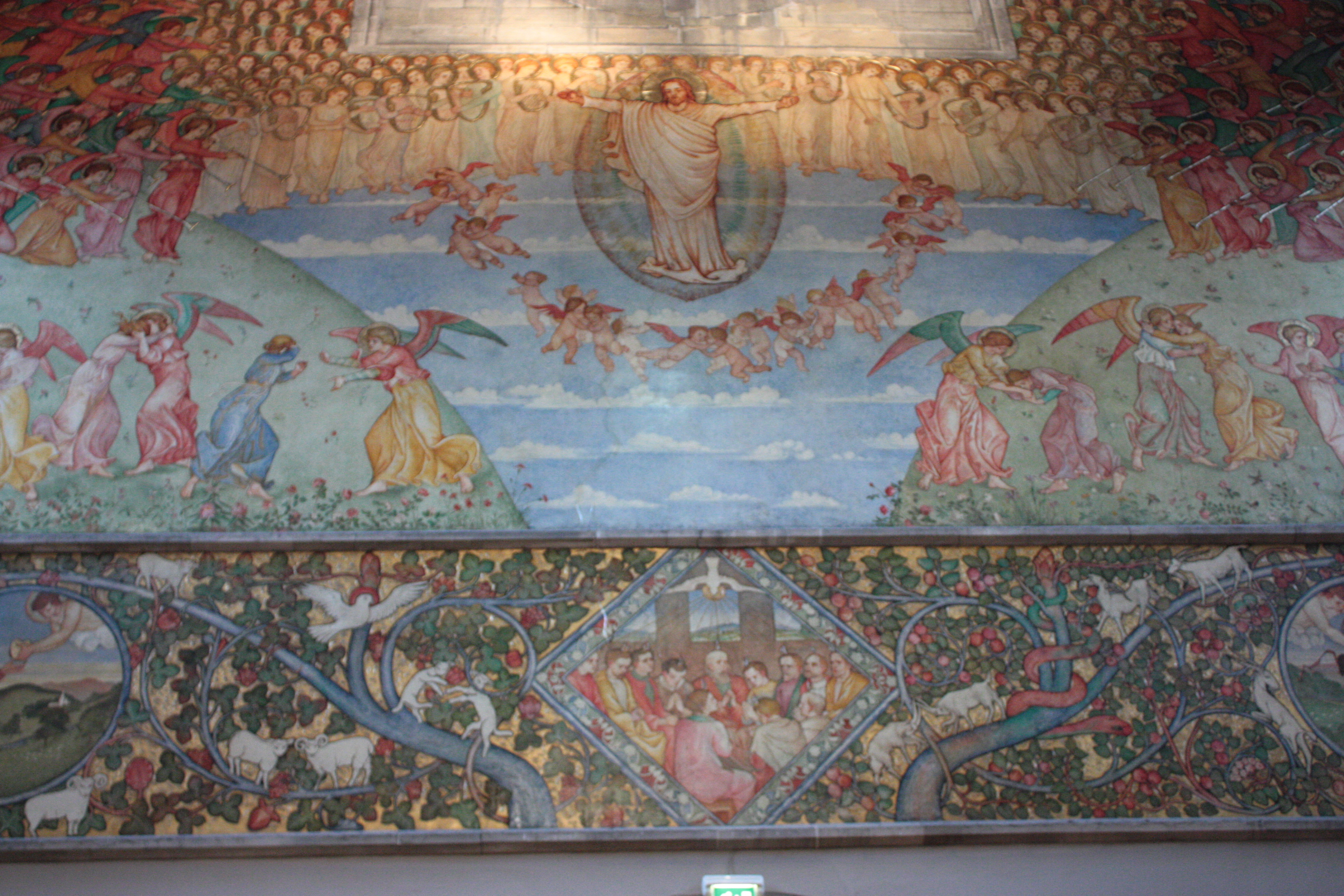
Catholic Apostolic Church murals, Edinburgh (west end)

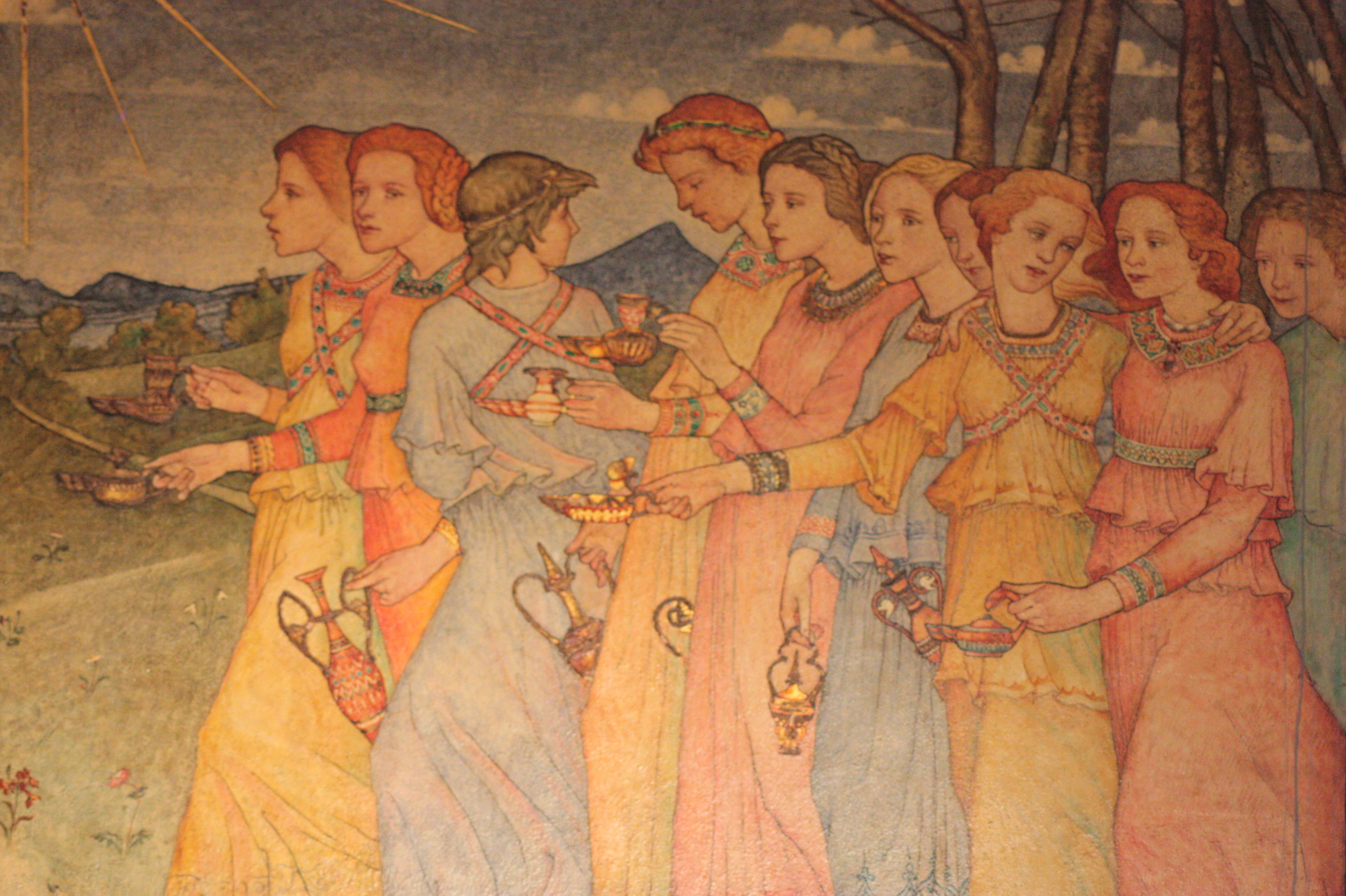
The Parable of the Ten Virgins (section)

Mansfield Place Church was built as a parish of the Catholic Apostolic Church. Architect Robert Rowand Anderson was commissioned by the Apostles of the church to build a new Edinburgh parish in 1872, after the church's original neoclassical building was outgrown. The building was consecrated in 1876. The absence of aisles in the church were designed to provide parishioners with an unobstructed view of the Catholic Apostolic Church's elaborate liturgy. The church's interior was decorated (1893–1901) by Phoebe Anna Traquair. This work, her best-known, has been called "Edinburgh’s Sistine Chapel". It is a Category A Listed Building.

Following the death of the parish's last Catholic Apostolic priest in 1958, the Catholic Apostolic history of the building ended. From 1974 to 1988, it was owned by the Reformed Baptist Church, and it was later sold to the Edinburgh Brick Company. Under the ownership of the Brick Company, the building was essentially derelict, and its interior murals decayed. Friends of Mansfield Place Church was founded in 1992, and the Mansfield Traquair Trust was founded one year later to advocate for the restoration of the building. In 1996, the church received a £2.8 million Heritage Lottery Fund award grant, and in 1997, the Edinburgh Council served a compulsory purchase order on the Edinburgh Brick Company. The Traquair Trust purchased the building in 1998, and initial restoration was done from 2000 to 2002, while the Traquair murals were restored from 2003 to 2005.

Currently, the sanctuary of the Church is used as a multi-purpose events venue, while the rest of the building was converted into a headquarters for the Scottish Council for Voluntary Organisations, which moved in during 2003 and leases space from the Mansfield Traquair Trust. Guided tours are regularly conducted in the sanctuary.
