= Scottish Council for Voluntary Organisations =

- Abbreviation: SCVO
- Formation: 1943
- Type: Umbrella body
- Headquarters: 19A Canning Street, Edinburgh
- Region served: Scotland
- Members: 2,300 (approx.)
- Chief executive: Anna Fowlie
- Convener: Richard Jennings
- Staff: 100
- Website: www.scvo.scot

The Scottish Council for Voluntary Organisations (SCVO) is the national membership body for Scotland’s voluntary organisations. SCVO's mission is to champion the role of voluntary organisations in building a flourishing society and support them to do work that has a positive impact.

SCVO focuses on what the voluntary sector can achieve. Along with a community of 3,300 (approx.) members and supporters, SCVO believes that a thriving voluntary sector should be at the heart of a successful, fair and inclusive Scotland.

SCVO provides services and support to the third sector in Scotland to advance shared values and interests. The organisation employs approximately 100 staff.

== Aims ==
SCVO’s aims are to:

- Be an authoritative voice for the voluntary sector
- Support a diverse sector
- Perform well to deliver success.

== Governance ==
SCVO is governed by a Management Board with representatives elected from its Policy Committee. Anna Fowlie has been Chief Executive since 23 April 2018, taking over from Martin Sime who held the role from 1991 to late 2017. Richard Jennings is the current convener.

== History ==
The organisation was established on 1 October 1943 as the Scottish Council of Social Service (SCSS). During its first years much of the Council’s work was dictated by wartime need and its immediate aftermath.

In 1983 the Council’s name was changed to the Scottish Council for Community and Voluntary Organisations with the working title of Voluntary Action for Scotland. In 1986 the name Scottish Council for Voluntary Organisations was adopted.

In 2003, the SCVO moved its headquarters to the newly restored and repurposed Mansfield Place Church in Edinburgh.

SCVO hosted the 6th, 7th and 8th CIVICUS World Assemblies in 2006, 2007 and 2008.

== Current work ==
SCVO supports the third sector in Scotland in a variety of ways, including

- Lobbying and campaigning on behalf of the sector
- Running training, conferences and events
- Providing services and deals to members
- Managing jobs and employability initiatives

== SCVO Credit Union ==
SCVO Credit Union Limited is a savings and loans co-operative established in 1998 for employees and open to anybody who is a trustee, employee or voluntary worker for any charitable organisation which is a registered member. It is a member of the Association of British Credit Unions Limited, authorised by the Prudential Regulation Authority and regulated by the Financial Conduct Authority and the PRA. Ultimately, like the banks and building societies, members’ savings are protected against business failure by the Financial Services Compensation Scheme.

== Sister organisations ==
- National Council for Voluntary Organisations (England)
- Wales Council for Voluntary Action (Wales)
- Northern Ireland Council for Voluntary Action (Northern Ireland)
- The Wheel (Ireland)
