= Nishi-Hommachi Station =

Future station on the Naniwasuji Line

Nishi-Hommachi Station 西本町駅
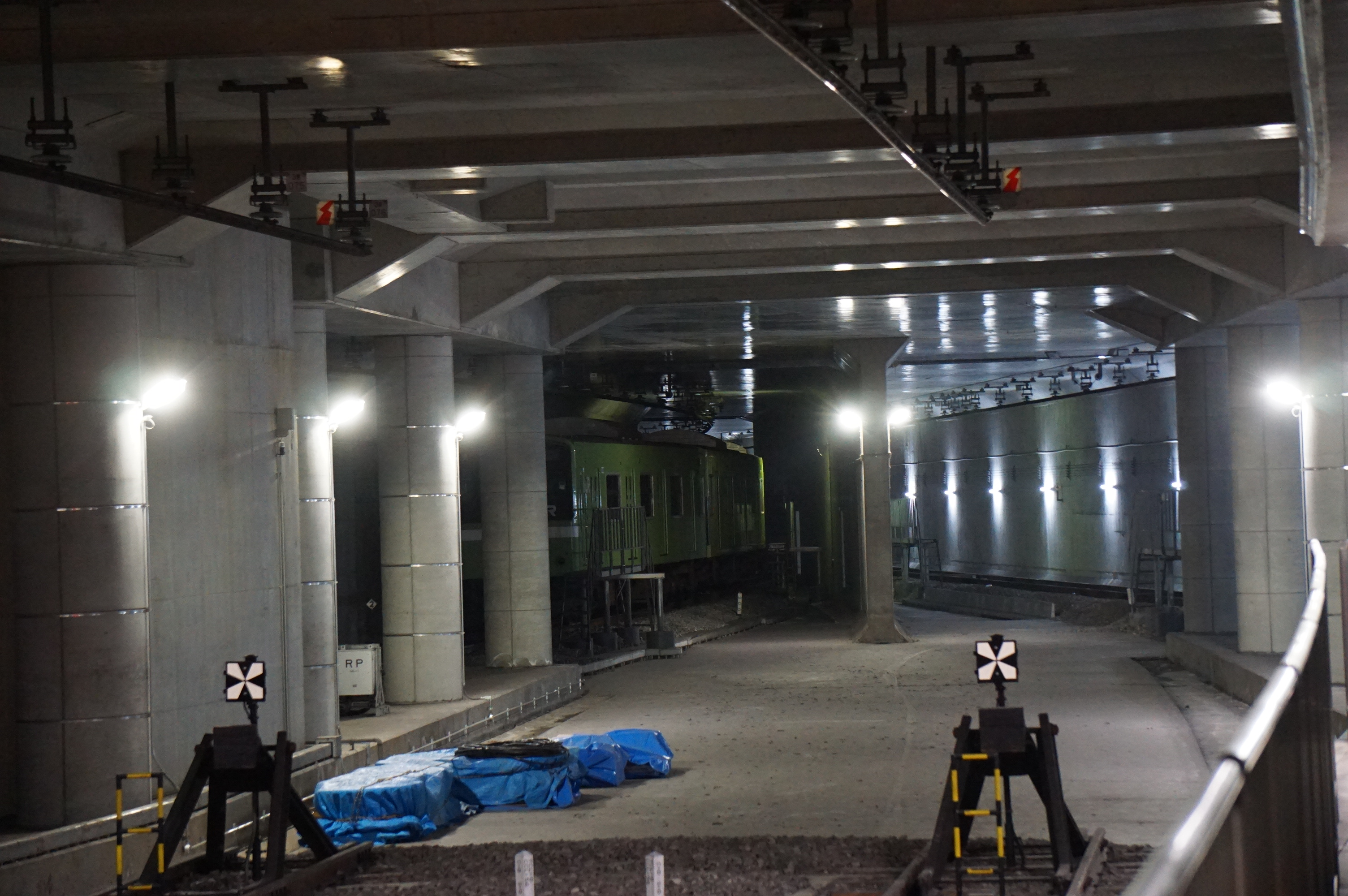
- Space at the adjacent JR Namba Station reserved for the Naniwasuji Line

General information
- Location: Awaza-Itchome, Nishi-ku, Osaka
- Coordinates: 34°40′54.04″N 135°29′34.90″E
- Operator: West Japan Railway Company; Nankai Electric Railway
- Line: Naniwasuji Line
- Platforms: 1 island platform
- Tracks: 2
- Connections: M 18 C 16 Y 13 Hommachi Station

Other information
- Status: Under construction

History
- Opening: 2031; 5 years' time
Location

Nishi-Hommachi Station (西本町駅, Nishi-Honmachi-eki) is a station located in Awaza-Itchome, Nishi-ku, Osaka. It is a station on the upcoming Naniwasuji Line that will be jointly operated by the West Japan Railway Company (JR West) and Nankai Electric Railway.

== Structural layout ==
The station is at the junction of the JR Namba and Nankai Shin-Namba branches of the Naniwasuji Line. It has 1 island platform and 2 tracks to serve trains in opposite directions on the upcoming Naniwasuji Line. It intersects with the Chuo Line of the Osaka Metro; however, underground pedestrian corridors are to be built to bridge the gap between this station and the Yotsubashi Line's Hommachi Station, instead of towards nearby Chuo Line stations.

== History ==
On 10 July 2019, the Ministry of Land, Infrastructure, Transport and Tourism issued the railway business license for the Naniwasuji Line. The construction was approved in 2020, and the expansion and renovation projects of several other stations were completed by 2023.

The total project cost increased from the initial projection of 329.1 billion yen to 642.5 billion yen due to rising construction material costs and labor expenses. The figure was slightly adjusted down from an intermediate peak projection of 650 billion yen by the Kansai Rapid Railway due to optimized underground structural methods, with Osaka Prefecture and Osaka City each projecting a municipal contribution of 114.6 billion yen. Municipal risk management assessments deemed the project's continuation valid as its re-evaluated Benefit-Cost (B/C) ratio landed at 1.05, surpassing the mandatory threshold.

The station will open in 2031, when the Naniwasuji Line opens.
