= Karl Wilding =

Karl Wilding FAcSS is a lecturer in philanthropic studies at the University of Kent in Canterbury, England. He was chief executive of the National Council for Voluntary Organisations (NCVO) from 2019 until 2021.
