= Sarah Elliott (charity manager) =

English charity executive (1982-)

Chief executive of Shelter
- Incumbent
- Assumed office September 2025

Personal details
- Born: Sarah Elizabeth Elliott; February 1982 (age 44)

Sarah Elizabeth Elliott (born February 1982) is the Chief Executive of the charity Shelter, based in London, England. She took office in September 2025.

Elliott was previously, until 2025, the chief executive of the National Council for Voluntary Organisations (NCVO). She was appointed to that post in March 2022, having held it on an interim basis since January 2021. She became a member of NCVO's staff in 2020 and was previously CEO of the Neurological Alliance.

She is a trustee of The Trussell Trust.
