= Mahoroba (train) =

Japanese train service

The Mahoroba (まほろば) is a limited express train service in Japan operated by JR West connecting Ōsaka Station and Nara Station that started operation in November 2019. It runs on the Osaka Higashi Line and Yamatoji Line on weekends and holidays and was initially a seasonal train, before beginning year-round operation in March 2025.

The name Mahoroba was previously used from April to June 2010 for a special limited express service between Shin-Ōsaka Station and Nara Station that ran on Tokaido Main Line (Umeda Freight Line), Osaka Loop Line, and Kansai Main Line (Yamatoji Line) from April to June 2010.

== 2010 operation overview ==
Mahoroba (2010)
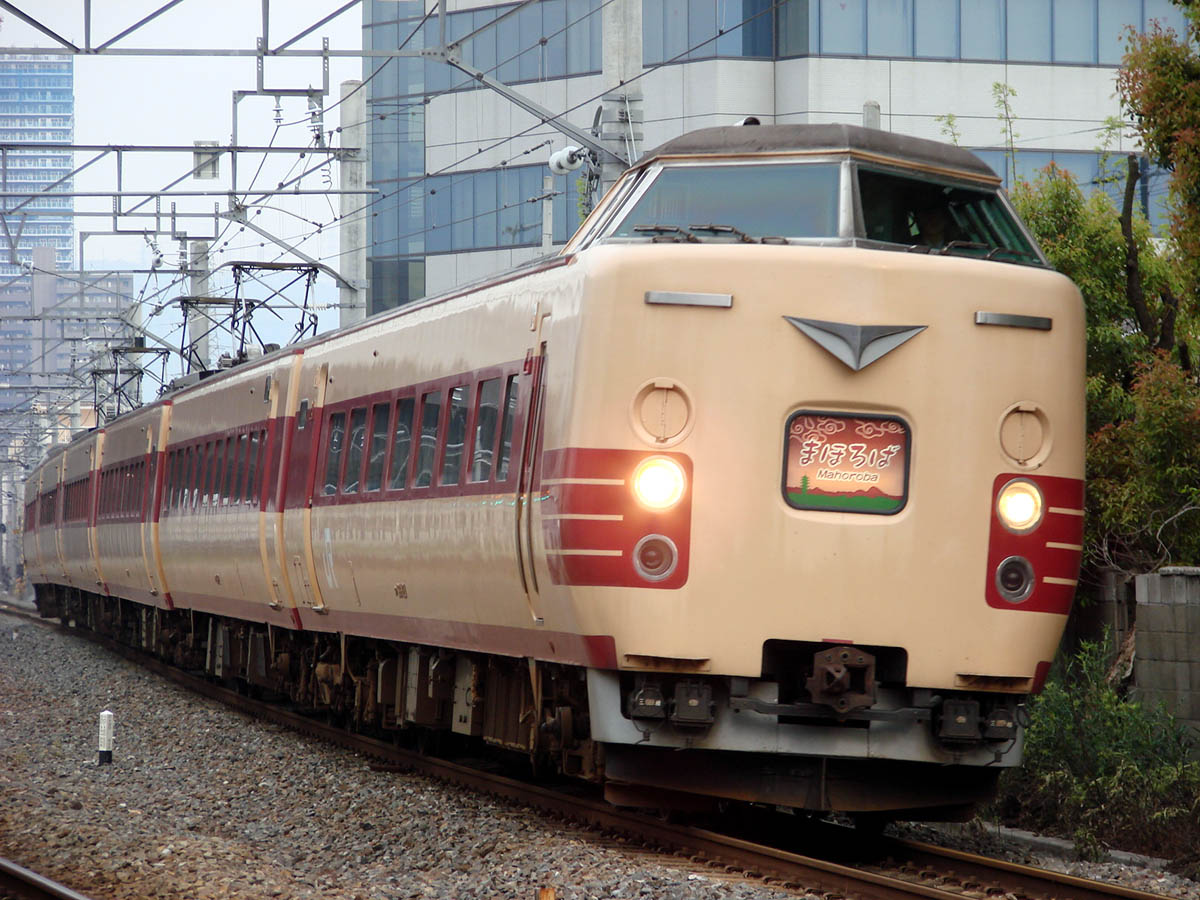
- 381 series set on a Mahoroba service, April 2010

Overview
- Service type: Limited express
- Status: Former
- First service: April 1, 2010
- Last service: June 27, 2010
- Current operator: JR West

Route
- Termini: Shin-Ōsaka; Nara
- Stops: 4
- Distance travelled: 52.0 km (32.3 mi)
- Service frequency: Daily (weekends and holidays)
- Train number: 9093 (towards Nara) 9094 (towards Shin-Osaka)

On-board services
- Class: Standard
- Disabled access: None
- Seating arrangements: Standard
- Sleeping arrangements: None
- Catering facilities: None
- Observation facilities: None
- Entertainment facilities: None
- Other facilities: Toilets

Technical
- Rolling stock: 381 series
- Track gauge: 1,067 mm (3 ft 6 in)
- Electrification: 1,500 V DC
- Operating speed: 120 km/h (75 mph)
- Track owner: JR West

From April 1 to June 30, 2010, a "Nara Destination Campaign" was held to attract more tourists to Nara. It also marked the 1,300th anniversary of the transfer of the capital to Heijo-kyo, and the 1,300th Anniversary Commemorative Project of Heijo-kyo was held centering on the ruins of Heijo Palace in Nara City. Six JR companies were cooperating with this. The section and service route were the same as those of the Venue Access Rapid Service that was operated during the Nara Silk Road Exposition in 1988.

Inside the train, a commemorative boarding pass with a different design was distributed for the outbound and return trips. Passengers bound for Nara were presented with Nara souvenirs by lottery, and the lottery number was printed on the back of the commemorative boarding pass for the outbound trip. On the last run on June 27, station staff saw off the train in Meiji-era uniforms, and the train departed when the stationmaster of Nara gave the departure signal.

Trains stopped at the following stations: Shin-Ōsaka – Tennoji – Horyuji - Nara

- It operated via the Umeda Freight Line, because the Ume-kita underground platforms at Osaka Station were not open at that time.

Formations:

- Green: Green car (first class)
- White: Standard car (second class)
- G (green car)
- R (standard car): Reserved seats only
- NR (standard car): Non Reserved seats only
- No smoking available.

Direction
left: Nara
right: Shin-Osaka

- The services operated with 6-car formations.

1	2	3	4	5	6
R	R	NR	NR	NR	NR

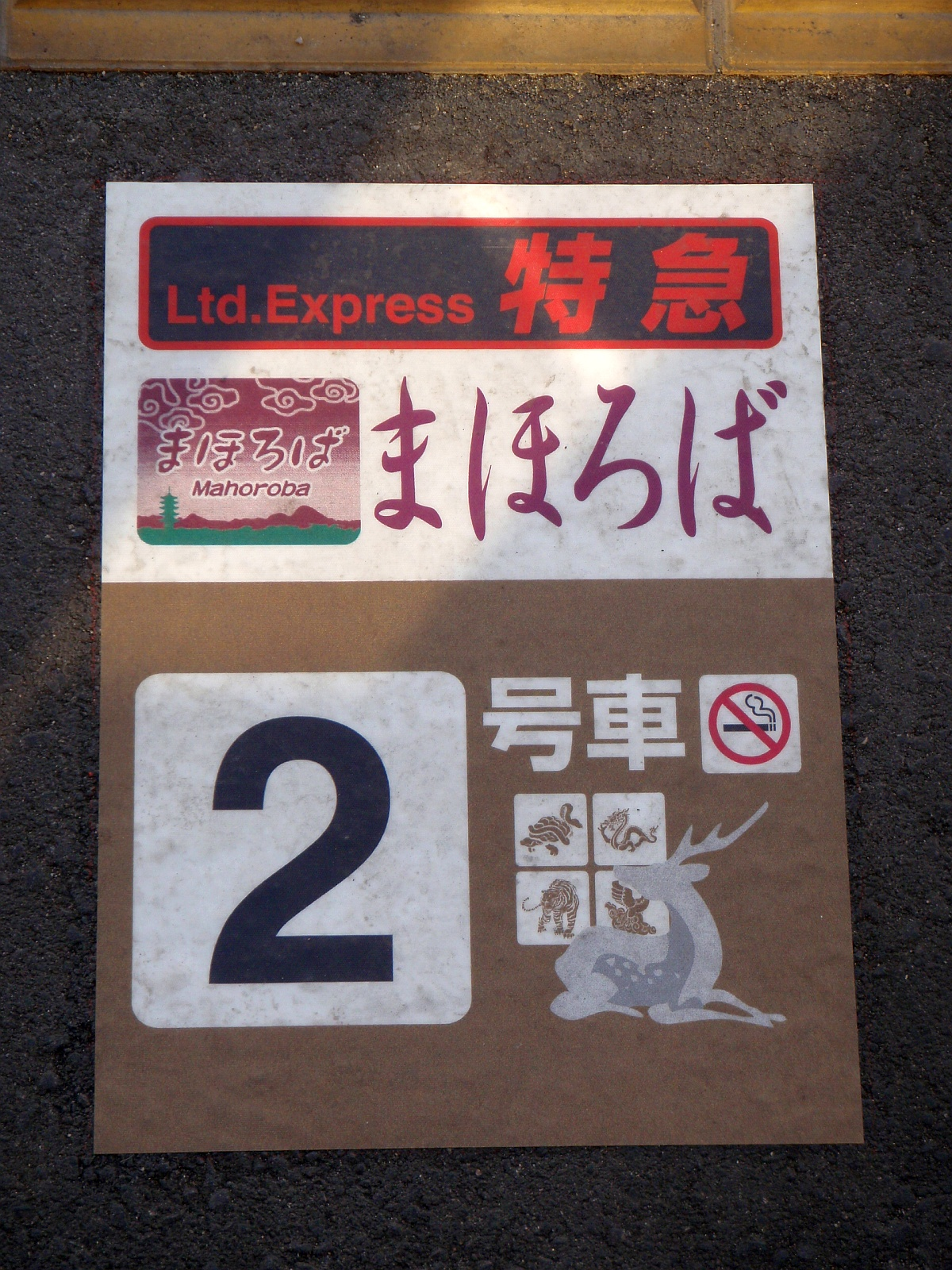
The boarding position display at Nara Station.

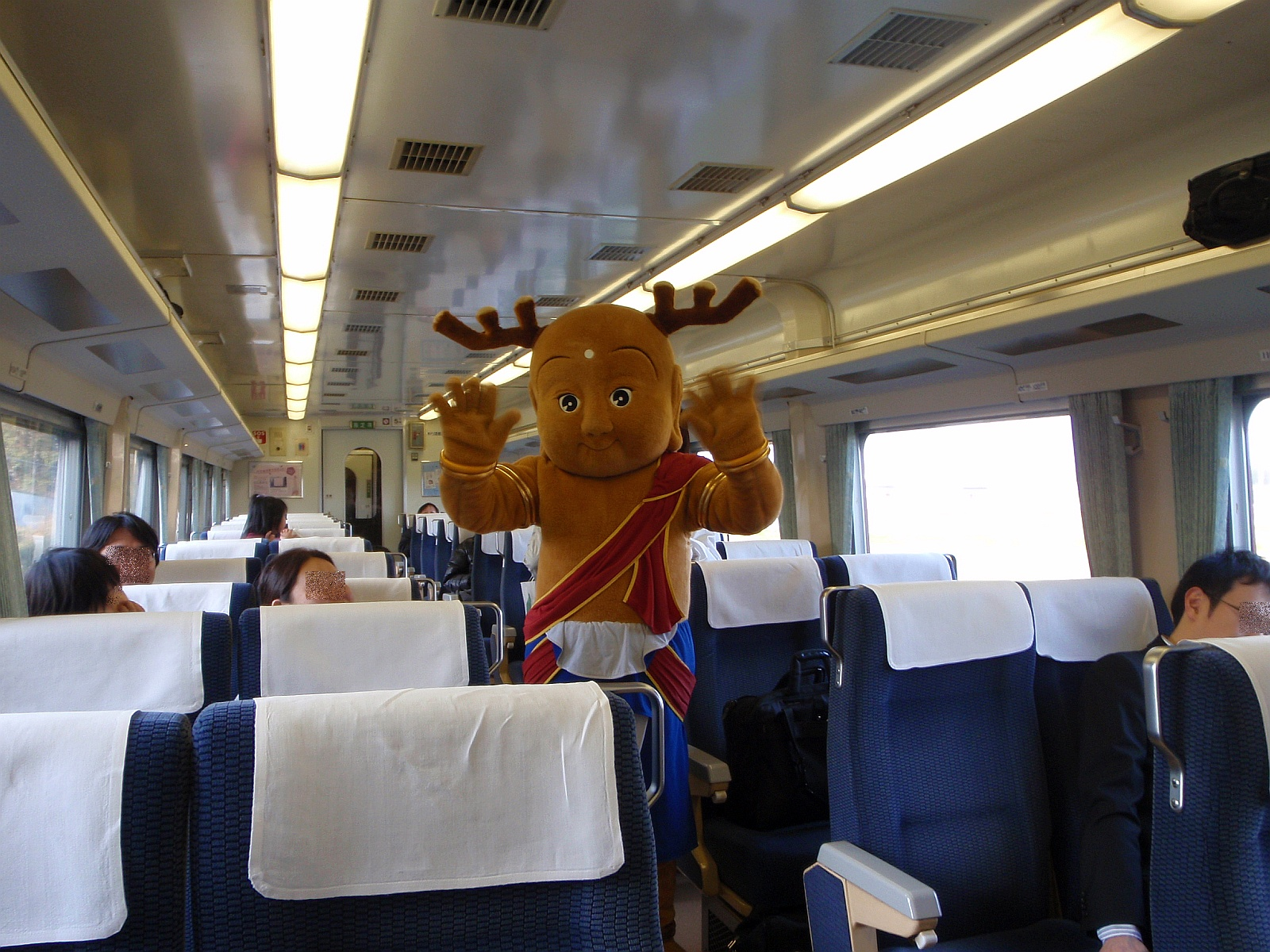
Here the mascot “Sento-kun” was greeting passengers on the train.

== 2019 to present ==
Mahoroba (2019)
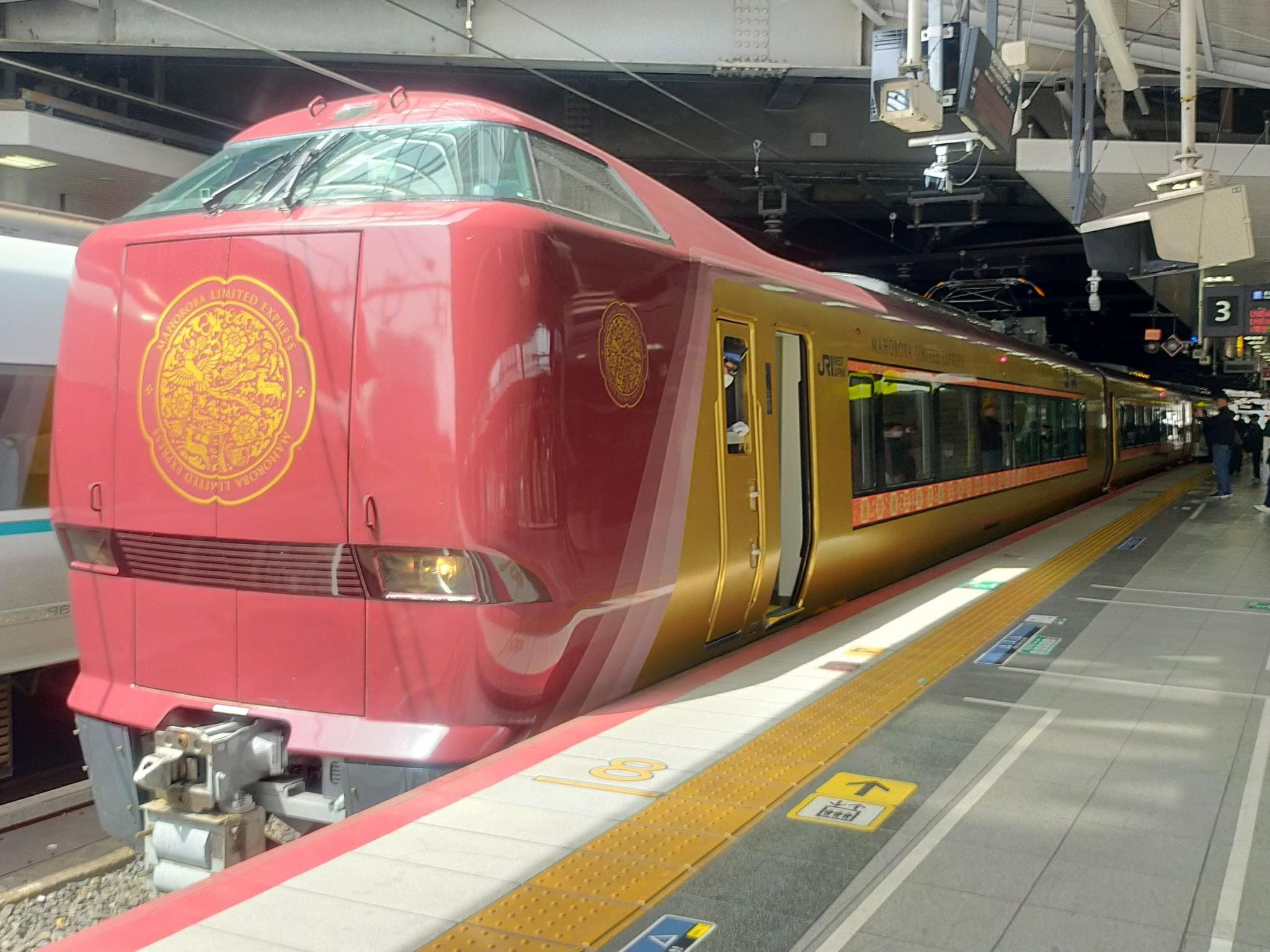
- A Mahoroba service at Shin-Ōsaka Station

Overview
- Service type: Limited express
- Status: Operational
- Current operator: JR West

Route
- Termini: Ōsaka; Nara
- Stops: 4
- Distance travelled: 54.4 km (33.8 mi)
- Average journey time: 59 minutes approx (Ōsaka – Nara)
- Service frequency: Daily (weekends and holidays)
- Train numbers: 9022M (towards Nara), 9021M (towards Osaka)
- Lines used: Umeda Freight Line (Tōkaidō Main Line), Osaka Higashi Line, Yamatoji Line

On-board services
- Class: Standard
- Disabled access: Yes
- Sleeping arrangements: None
- Catering facilities: None
- Observation facilities: None
- Entertainment facilities: None
- Other facilities: Toilets, wheelchair spaces

Technical
- Rolling stock: 683 series
- Track gauge: 1,067 mm (3 ft 6 in)
- Electrification: 1,500 V DC
- Operating speed: 130 km/h (81 mph)
- Track owner: JR West

Following the completion of the Osaka Higashi Line to Shin-Ōsaka Station in March 2019, JR West resumed the operation of Mahoroba on weekends and holidays during the high tourist season from November to December that year. Unlike the previous iteration of the service, the new limited express runs nonstop between Shin-Ōsaka and Osaka to compete with Kintetsu Nara Line that runs between the two cities. JR West scheduled two daily round-trips with connections to San'yō Shinkansen trains in mind.

In March 2023, Mahoroba services began terminating at Ōsaka Station following the opening of the underground Umekita area platforms, running on the Umeda Freight Line branch of the Tōkaidō Main Line from Shin-Ōsaka to Ōsaka.

In December 2024, JR West announced that beginning March 2025, Mahoroba would make one regular daily roundtrip on weekends and holidays throughout the year, plus an additional daily roundtrip between March and October. JR West also announced the introduction of two 683 series sets specially refurbished for the Mahoroba service that would start operating in April 2025.

Trains stop at the following stations:

- Ōsaka – Shin-Ōsaka – Hōryūji - Nara

Formations:

- White: Standard car (second class)
- Wheelchair-accessible facility in car 2
- No smoking available.
- The services are operated as 3-car formation.

← Nara Osaka →
1	2	3
Reserved	Reserved	Reserved

2019-2024
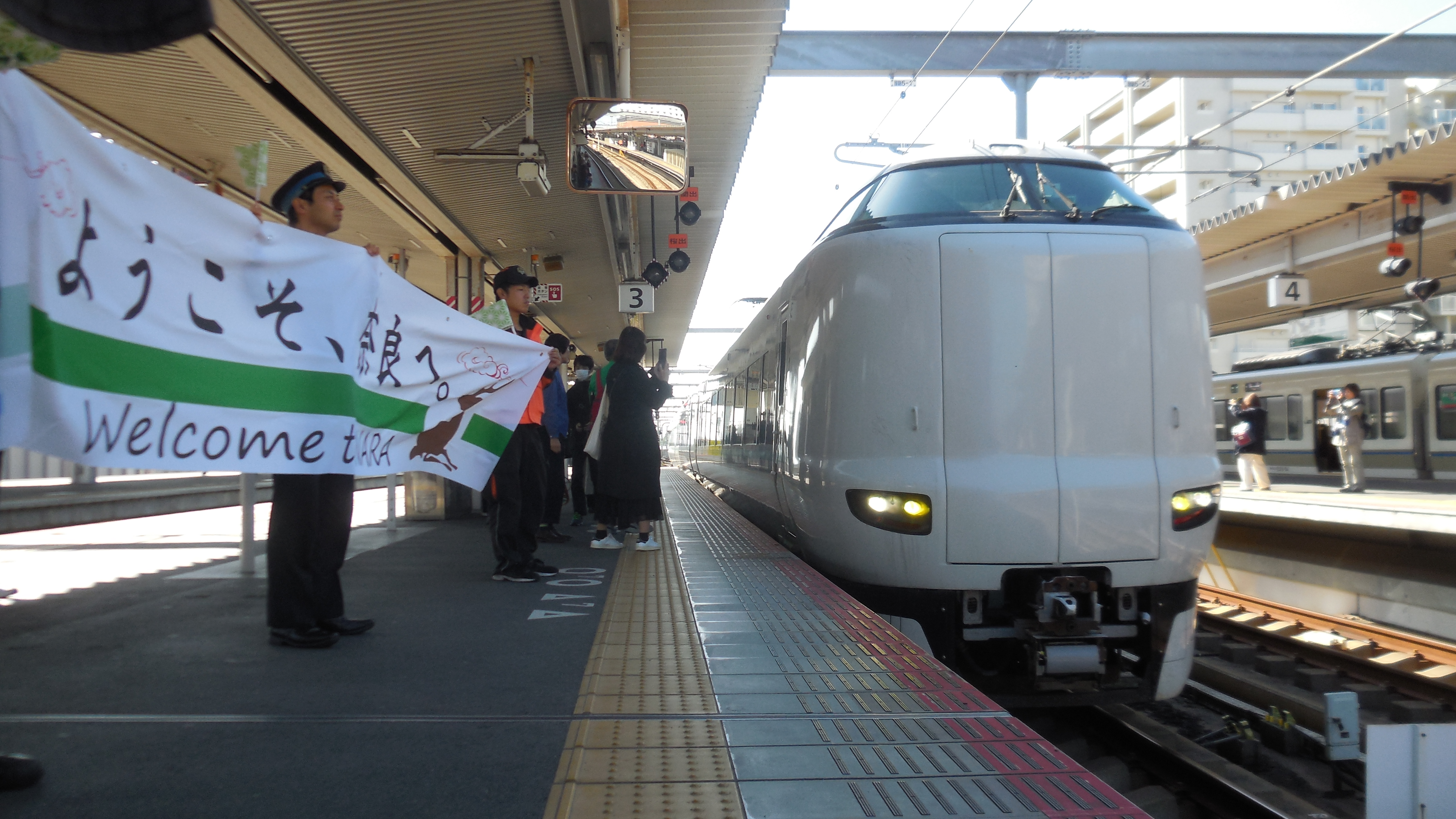
287 series at Nara station as Mahoroba on the first day of service, November 2, 2019

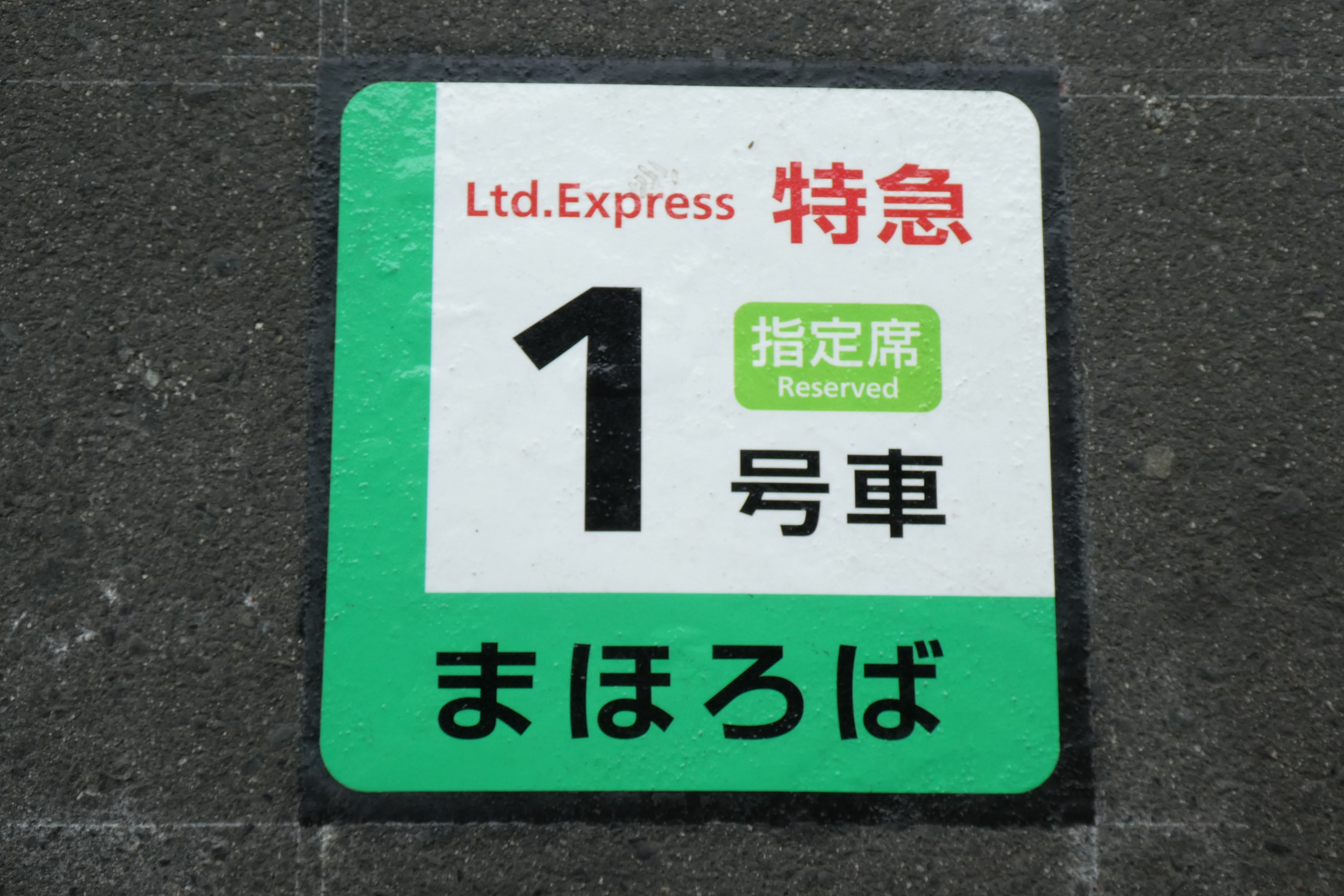
The boarding position display at Nara Station

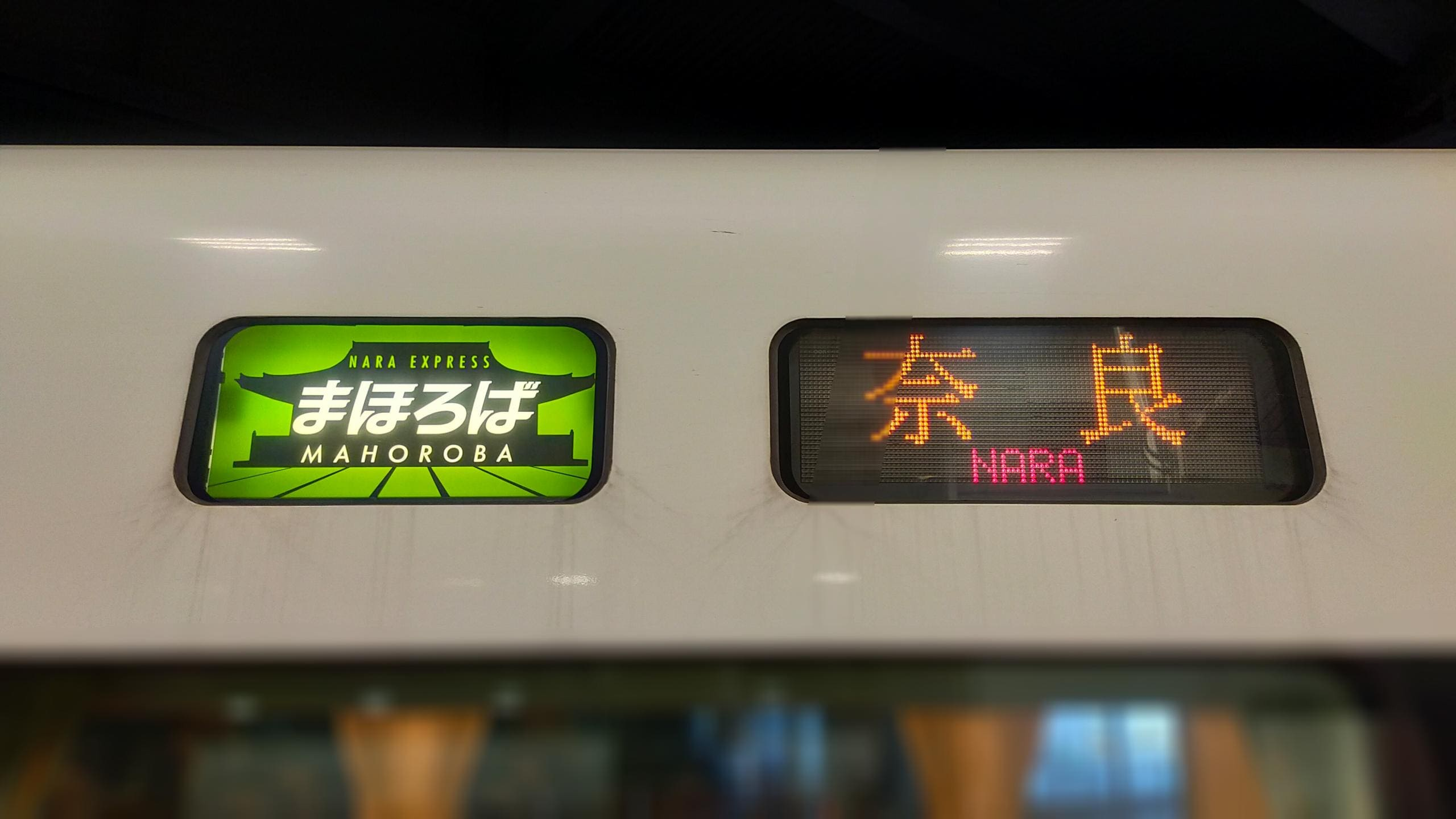
Train name and destination sign

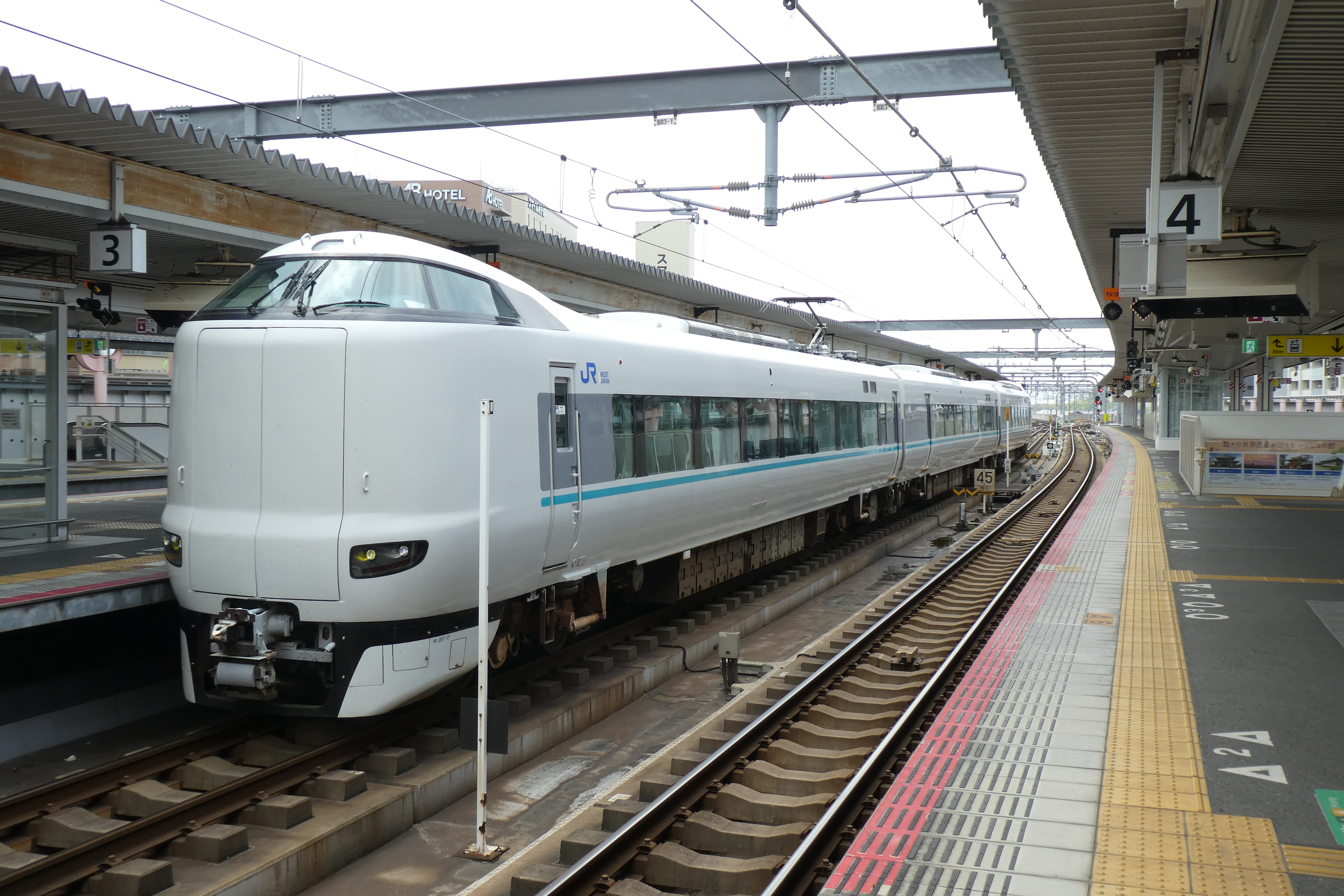
287 series at Nara station on a Mahoroba service on April 6, 2020
2025 to present
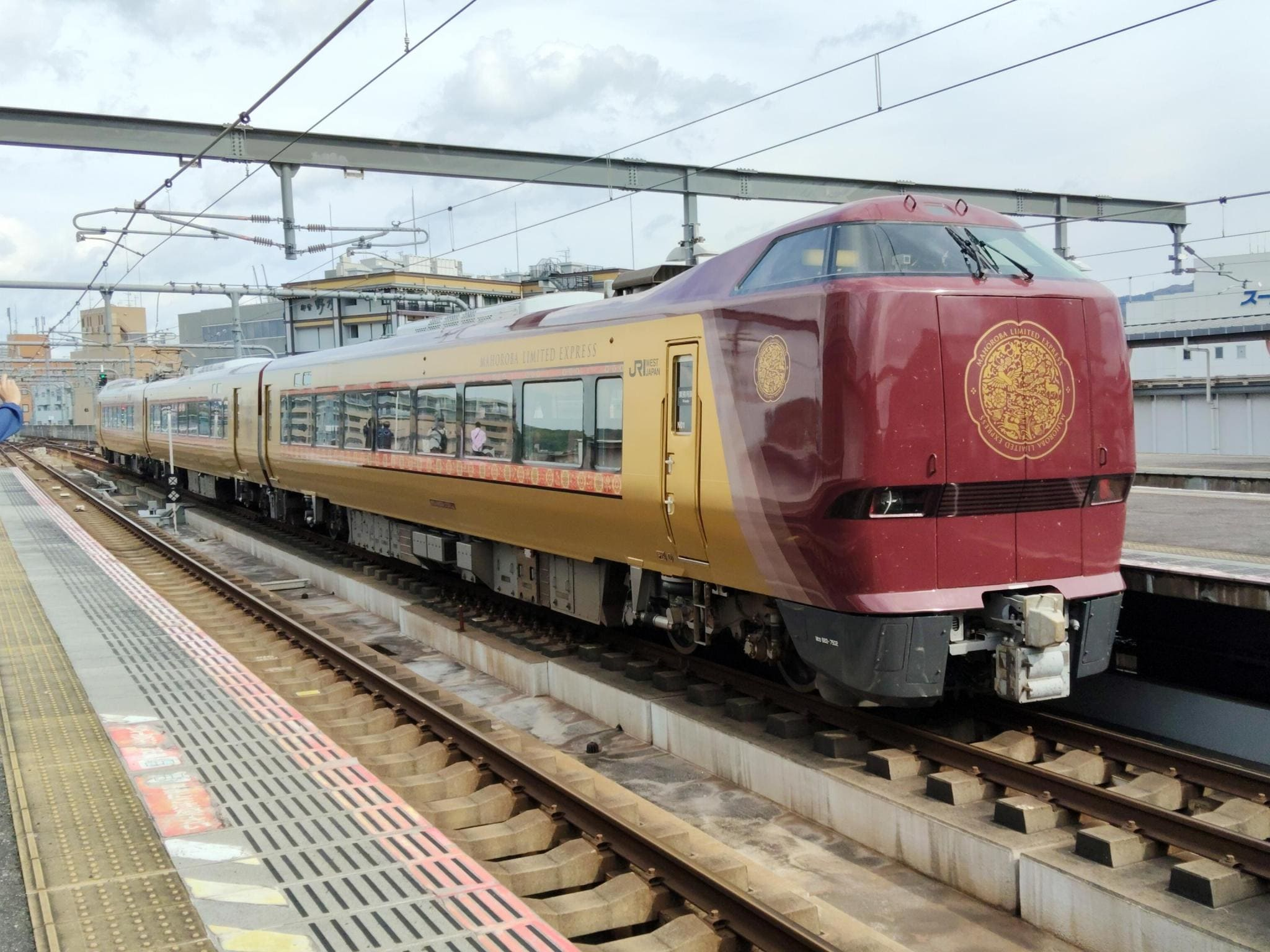
683 series Annei set at Nara Station on the first day of operation as Mahoroba, April 5, 2025

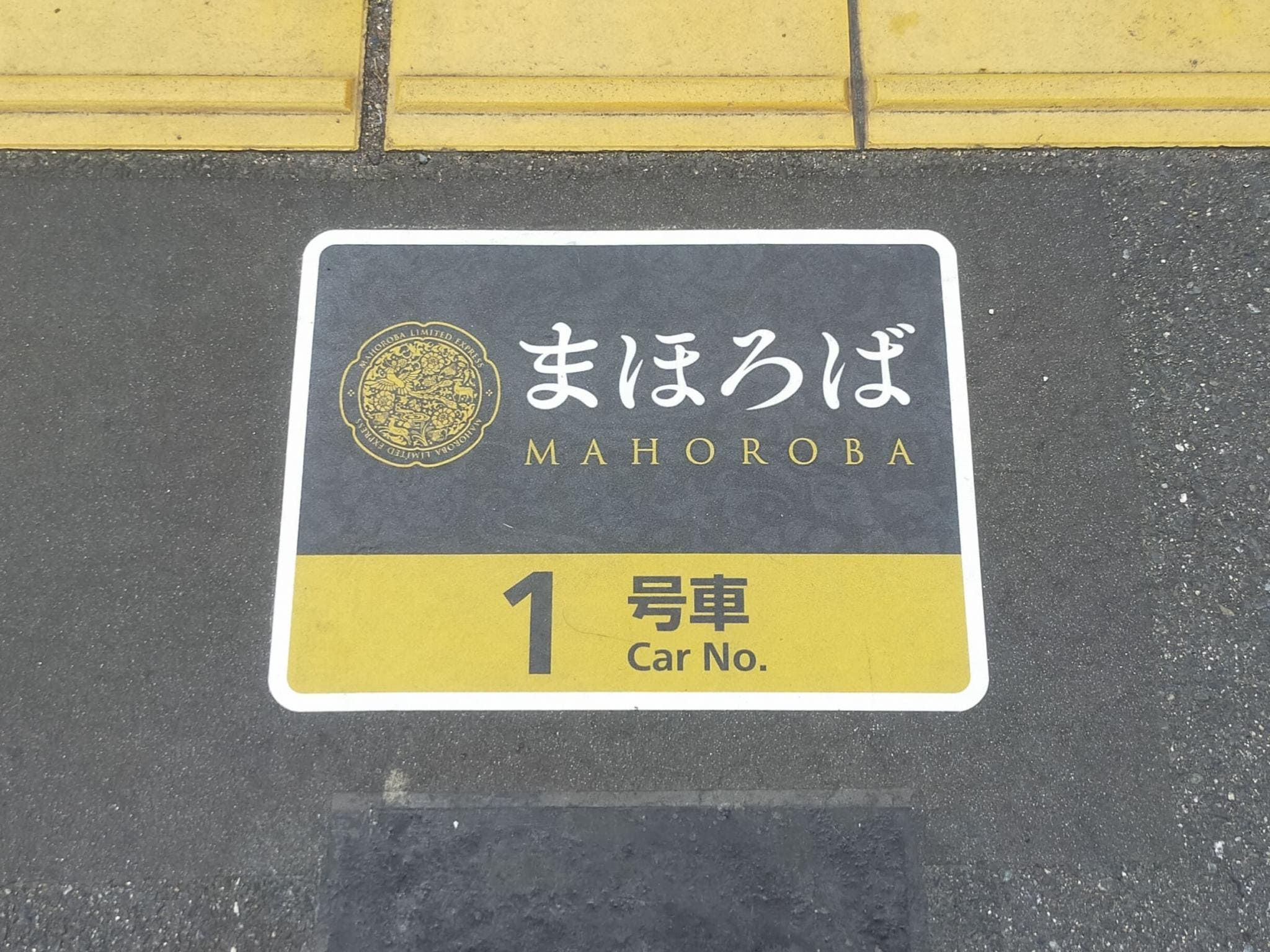
The boarding position display at Nara Station

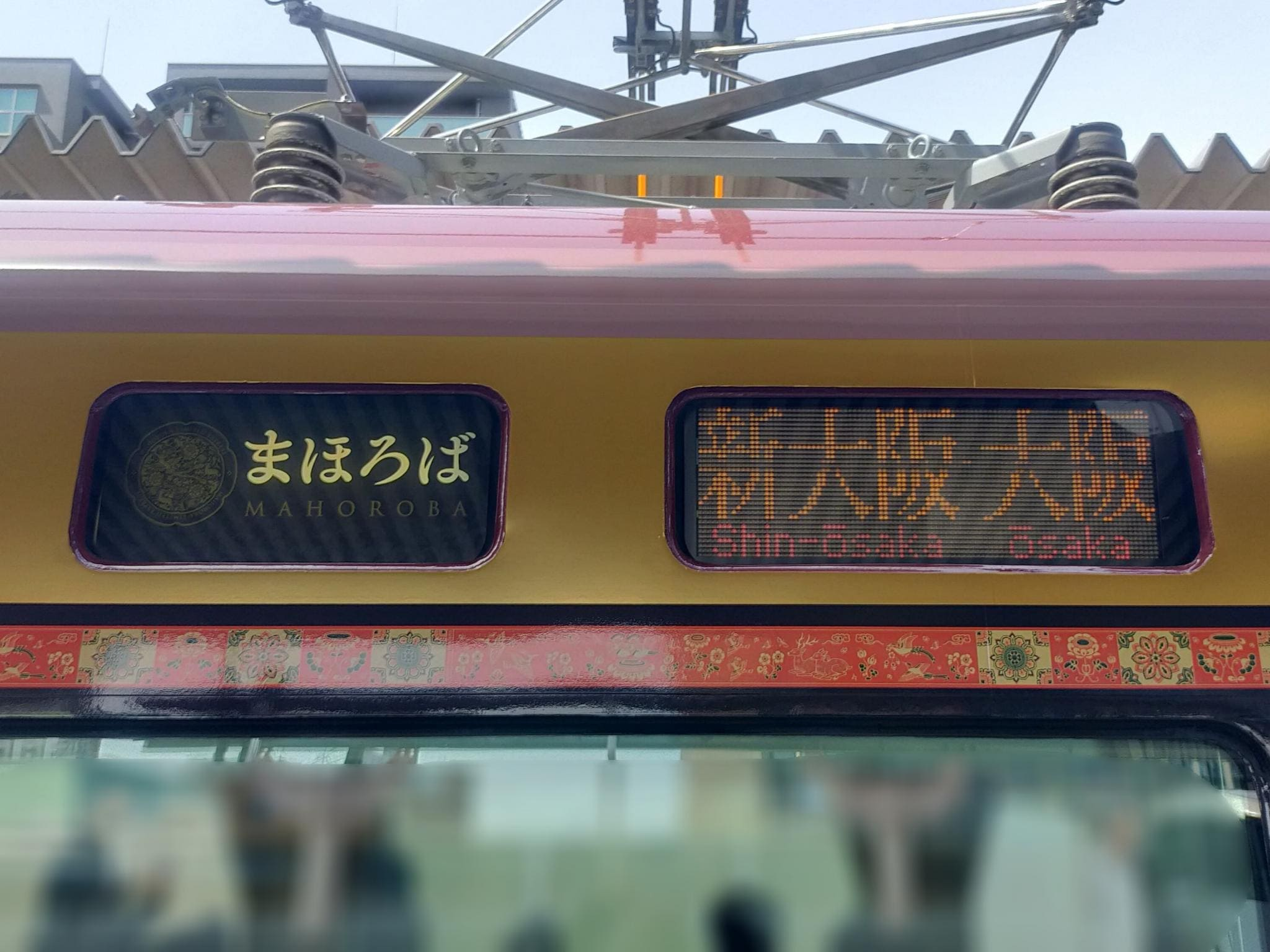
Train name and destination sign

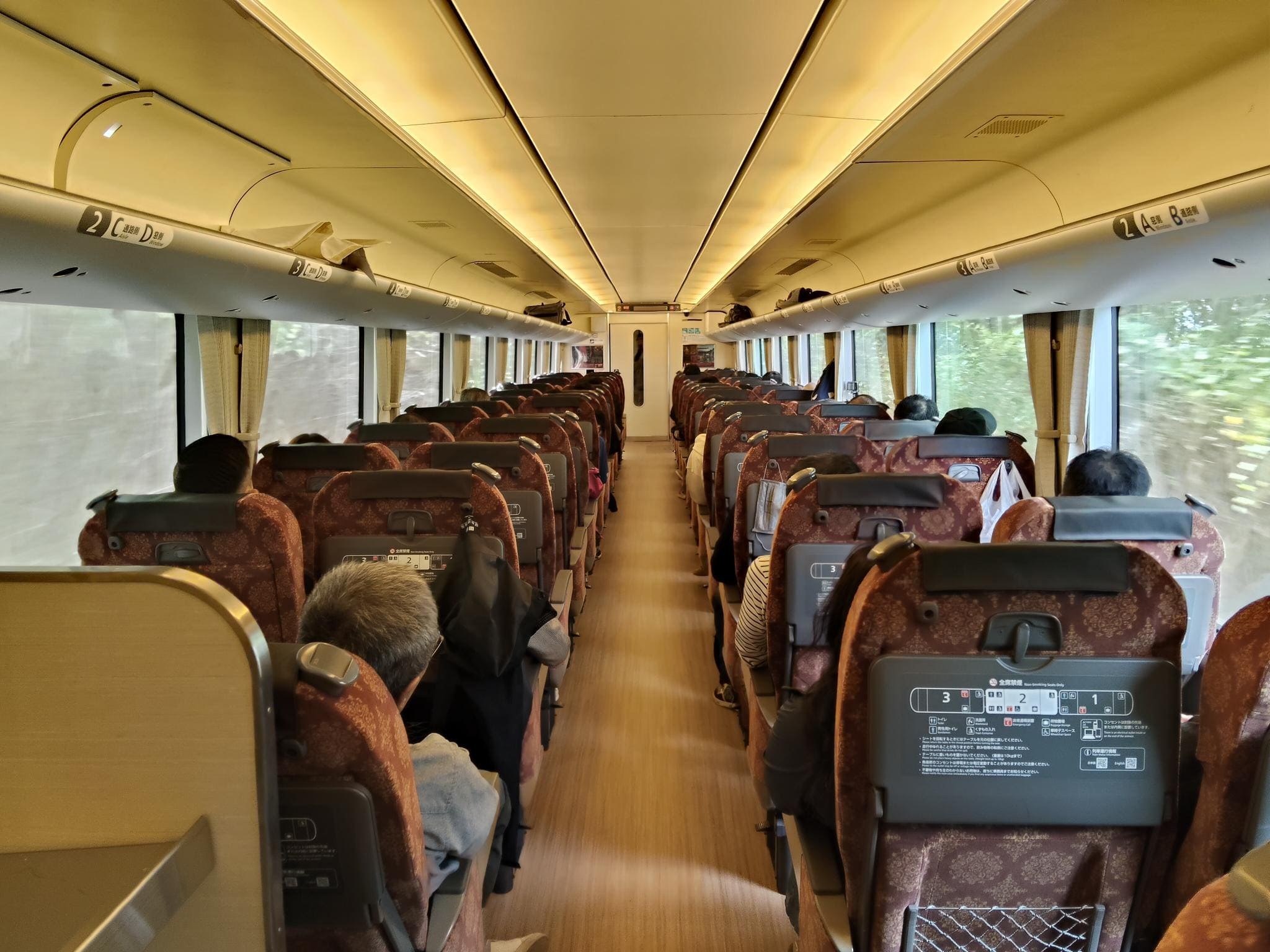
Refurbished 683 series interior

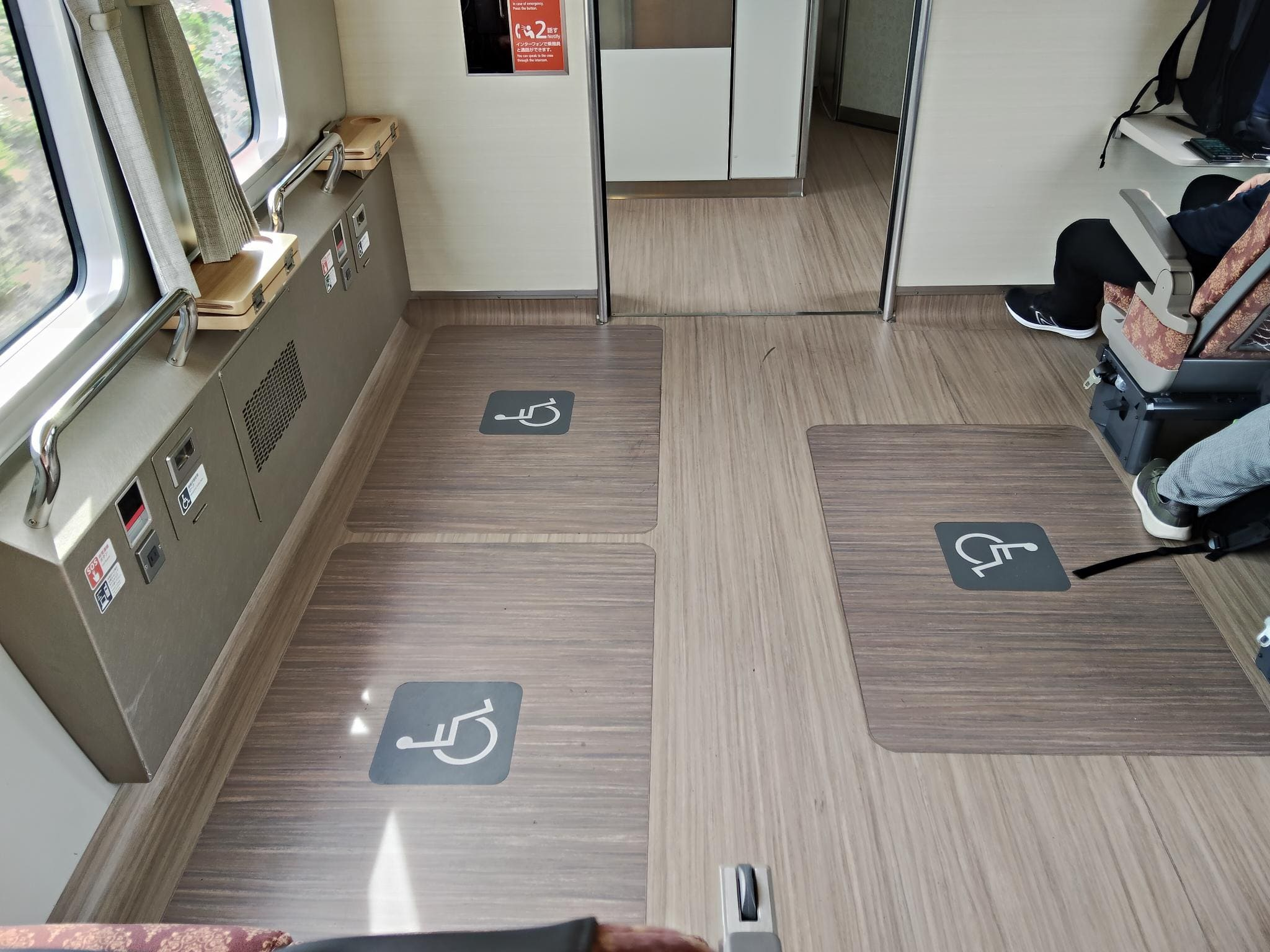
Wheelchair space on the refurbished 683 series set

== See also ==
- Rakuraku Yamato - A regular Weekday rush hour Commuter Limited Express train that also runs on the Yamatoji Line
- List of named passenger trains of Japan
