= Wales Council for Voluntary Action =

National membership organisation for the third sector and volunteering in Wales

Wales Council for Voluntary Action (WCVA; Welsh: Cyngor Gweithredu Gwirfoddol Cymru, CGGC) is the national membership organisation for the third sector and volunteering in Wales. Its aim is to work towards 'A future where the third sector and volunteering thrive across Wales, improving wellbeing for all'.

WCVA provides services and support to charities, community groups, voluntary organisations, social enterprises and volunteers.

WCVA’s membership consists of over 2,500 third sector organisations. It also has partners from the private and statutory sectors who support its work.

In Wales, there is also a county level infrastructure body. Each county has a County Voluntary Council as well as volunteer centres. The 19 local County Voluntary Councils in Wales, and the national support body WCVA, make up a network of support organisations for the third sector in Wales called Third Sector Support Wales. The equivalent infrastructure and representative body for voluntary organisations in Scotland is SCVO. In Northern Ireland it is NICVA and in England it is NCVO. The equivalent bodies for the promotion, support and celebration of volunteering are Volunteer Now (in Northern Ireland), Volunteer Development Scotland and NCVO in England. Along with WCVA, these are the members of the UK Volunteering Forum.

== Location ==
WCVA has three offices in Wales, in Cardiff, Rhyl and Aberystwyth.

== History ==
WCVA was born in 1934 and known as the South Wales and Monmouthshire Council of Social Service. During the Depression, the Council funded district nurses at a cost of £100 a year, and supported co-op schemes to dig mountain coal and keep fit classes for women. In the following decades WCVA’s scope increased, and it supported the founding of organisations like Citizens’ Advice Bureaux and Disability Wales.

Since then, WCVA has promoted volunteering across Wales, launched the Wales Volunteer of the Year scheme, taken on the co-ordination of the Communities First Support Service and helps manage the Environment Wales project, which offers funding to groups working in the climate change arena. It also provides training opportunities for the third sector in Wales and runs a range of conferences and seminars for the sector each year.

== Current WCVA projects ==
Recruit3 – Run in conjunction with Big Issue Cymru, this is a recruitment site for the third sector.

Participation Cymru – To encourage participation in public life in Wales.

Environet Cymru – Funding and supporting groups working with the environment.

Volunteering Wales Grant Fund – WCVA manages this Welsh Government funded grant scheme.
