= National Council for Voluntary Organisations =

UK organisation

- Abbreviation: NCVO
- Formation: 1919; 107 years ago (as the National Council of Social Services (NCSS))
- Type: Charity and membership organisation
- Headquarters: King's Cross, London
- Region served: England
- Members: 17,000+
- Chief executive: Kate Lee
- Revenue: £12.275 million (2024)
- Staff: 75 (2025)
- Website: www.ncvo.org.uk

The National Council for Voluntary Organisations (NCVO) is the umbrella body for the voluntary and community sector in England. It is a registered charity (no. 225922). It works to support the voluntary and community sector and to create an environment in which an independent civil society can flourish. NCVO has a membership of more than 17,000 voluntary organisations. These range from large national bodies to community groups, volunteer centres, and development agencies working at a local level. In 2025, its income was £9.5 million.

== History ==
NCVO started in 1919 as the National Council of Social Service (NCSS). NCSS was established in order to bring various voluntary bodies together and into closer relationships with government departments. Its foundation was made possible through a legacy from Edward Vivian Birchall, who had played a large part in the emergent voluntary sector before he was killed, aged 32, in France during the First World War. The organisation's first headquarters (from 1928 to 1992) were at 26 Bedford Square, London WC1.

On 1 April 1980, just over 60 years since its foundation, the NCSS became the National Council for Voluntary Organisations. On 1 January 2013, NCVO merged with Volunteering England (which itself had recently merged with Student Volunteering England).

=== Previous presidents ===
- 1919–1921: James Lowther, 1st Viscount Ullswater
- 1921–1928: J H Whitley
- 1928–1932: Captain E A FitzRoy
- 1932–1935: J H Whitley (second term)
- 1935–1938: Charles Bathurst, 1st Viscount Bledisloe
- 1938–1939: Harry Snell, 1st Baron Snell
- 1939–1951: Sir Percy Malcolm Stewart
- 1951–1954: Edward Wood, 1st Earl of Halifax
- 1954–1957: Sir Edward Peacock
- 1964–1969: Lord Hayworth
- 1969–1973: Prince Philip, Duke of Edinburgh
- 1973–1981: Sir John Partridge
- 1981–1986: Sir John Hedley Greenborough
- 1986–1991: Sir Kenneth Durham
- 1991–1997: Sir Campbell Adamson
- 1997–2002: Raymond Plant, Baron Plant of Highfield
- 2002–2007: Patricia Rawlings, Baroness Rawlings
- 2007–2012: Robin Hodgson, Baron Hodgson of Astley Abbotts
- 2012–2017: Tanni Grey-Thompson, Baroness Grey-Thompson
- 2017–2024: Jill Pitkeathley, Baroness Pitkeathley

== Activity ==
NCVO headquarters are in the King's Cross area of London. NCVO represents the views of its members, and the wider voluntary sector to government, the European Union and other bodies. It carries out research into, and analysis of, the voluntary and community sector. It campaigns on issues affecting the whole of the voluntary and community sector, such as the role of voluntary and community organisations in public service delivery and the future of local government. It provides information, advice and support to other organisations and individuals working in or with the voluntary and community sector. Many now well-established voluntary organisations started out as projects within NCVO, including Age Concern, Citizens Advice, the Charities Aid Foundation, the Black Environment Network, the Youth Hostels Association and the National Federation of Young Farmers' Clubs.

In July 2019, NCVO's charity tax commission, chaired by Sir Nicholas Montagu, issued a report calling for the overhaul of tax relief to UK charities.

== Governance ==
NCVO's president, since 2024, is Delyth Morgan, Baroness Morgan of Drefelin. Dr Priya Singh is NCVO's chair. In 2021, Karl Wilding, who had succeeded Sir Stuart Etherington as chief executive in 2020, was replaced by Sarah Vibert (now known as Sarah Elliott) on a permanent basis in March 2022. Etherington had succeeded Judy Weleminsky in 1994. Kate Lee was appointed chief executive in August 2025.

== Finances ==
In the year ending March 2025, NCVO's income was £9.5 million, of which £250,000 was from government grants. Its expenditure was £8.8M, of which £7.01M was spent on its charitable purposes.

== Sister organisations ==
The equivalent infrastructure bodies for voluntary organisations in other parts of the UK are:

- Wales Council for Voluntary Action (WCVA)
- Scottish Council for Voluntary Organisations (SCVO)
- Northern Ireland Council for Voluntary Action (NICVA)

== Controversy ==
On 5 February 2021, Third Sector magazine published details of an independent external review of NCVO's culture. The review was reported to have found "evidence of 'bullying and harassment' on the basis of race, gender, sexual orientation and disability happening 'with impunity' at all levels of the organisation, leaving members of minority groups there feeling 'unsafe at work'". Following the revelations, NCVO announced a series of strategic decisions including the closing of its searchable database for fundraisers, Funding Central. Karl Wilding stepped down from the position of chief executive in February 2021, citing the need for new leadership to bring about systemic cultural change at the organisation.
