= Northern Ireland Council for Voluntary Action =

Northern Ireland Council for Voluntary Action is the national infrastructure body for the voluntary and community sector in Northern Ireland. NICVA also hosts and manages several websites for Northern Ireland's voluntary and community sector online.

== History ==
NICVA began its life in 1938 as the Northern Ireland Council for Social Services in response to high levels of unemployment in Northern Ireland. It championed a programme of social action through welfare clubs, youth hostel tours, YMCA summer camps and a committee for women.

In 1949, NICSS opened a home for the elderly on the Belmont Road in Belfast. Pine Lodge marked the Council's growing responsibility for projects tackling community social deprivation.

In 1986, NICSS changed its name to NICVA, the Northern Ireland Council for Voluntary Action, in recognition of the expansion of the voluntary and community sector in Northern Ireland.

== Current work ==
NICVA is a membership organisation which seeks to represent voluntary and community organisations throughout Northern Ireland.

NICVA works for justice, equality and dignity throughout society by promoting opportunities for community participation in the essential decisions that affect the lives of people in Northern Ireland.

In 2010-2011 NICVA is engaged in a 'Smart Solutions in Tough Times' campaign to ensure that voluntary and community organisations are not seen as an easy target for budget cuts that government departments may have to make.

== Family of websites ==
Sites hosted and maintained by NICVA for the voluntary and community sector in Northern Ireland include: CommunityNI, A community site which allows the instant addition of news, jobs, opinions, events, or products and services, by registered users. GrantTracker: fundraising and funding news, including notice of applications open and closing deadlines, with search by criteria Sector Matters: a social enterprise providing business services to the voluntary and community sector and to small businesses.

== Projects ==
NICVA runs a number of specific projects:

Vital Links: Launched in March 2010, to increase interaction and understanding between the key government and public institutions, the voluntary and community sector and foster and promote positive engagement.

Centre for Economic Empowerment: Launched in April 2011, to provide a platform for discussion, analysis and best practice approaches to economic and societal challenges.

CollaborationNI: Launched in January 2011, in partnership with C03 and Stellar Leadership, to deliver a partnerships, collaboration and mergers support programme to the Northern Ireland voluntary and community sector on behalf of the Building Change Trust, supported by the Department for Social Development

Community Leadership Programme: The International Fund for Ireland’s (IFI) Community Leadership Programme, delivered by NICVA, is a training and learning programme which aims to strengthen the leadership capacities of groups. Through increased leadership skills, the Programme aims to assist groups in the development of sustainable, social, economic and community relations regeneration in disadvantaged areas.

== NICVA President ==
Kenneth Branagh became honorary president of NICVA in 2001, cementing a relationship of fifteen years.

Supporting NICVA helps it to support more than 5,000 other voluntary and community organisations in Northern Ireland through essential advice, training, information and policy work.

The Belfast-born, Oscar-nominated actor, writer and director has demonstrated his support for NICVA many times in the past. He has offered his new films for charity premieres, making personal visits to boost fundraising and promoting the work of the voluntary and community sector in Northern Ireland.

== Sister organisations ==
The equivalent infrastructure bodies for voluntary organisations in other parts of the UK are:

- National Council for Voluntary Organisations (NCVO), operating in England
- Wales Council for Voluntary Action (WCVA)
- Scottish Council for Voluntary Organisations (SCVO)
