= Voluntary sector =

Social activity undertaken by non-governmental nonprofit organizations; "third sector"

In relation to public services, the voluntary sector is the realm of social activity undertaken by non-governmental, not for profit organizations. This sector is also called the third sector (in contrast to the public sector and the private sector), community sector, and nonprofit sector. "Civic sector" or "social sector" are other terms used for the sector, emphasizing its relationship to civil society. Voluntary sector activities are important in many areas of life, including social care, child care, animal welfare, sport and environmental protection.

== Terminology ==
A variety of terms is in use to describe the non-governmental, not-for-profit sector, including "voluntary sector", "third sector", "community sector", and "nonprofit sector". In 1965, Richard Cornuelle coined the term "independent sector" and was one of the first scholars to point out the vast impact and unique mechanisms of this sector, but in some contexts, such as social care, this term includes businesses operating for profit.

A formal economic theory of the voluntary, nonprofit sector and its role was developed by Burton Weisbrod in the 1970s, and subsequent decade. It distinguishes its incentives and behaviors from that of the private and public sectors of the economy, and recognizes non-profit organizations as suppliers of public goods that are under-supplied by government. This enabled calculation of the value of voluntary labor in the United States, which is a factor now considered in the analysis of efficiency wage.

More recent researchers such as Peter Frumkin have also supported the concept of considering "non-profit" and "voluntary" organizations together. Rob Macmillan observed that the nature of this sector is "a hugely contested domain", with issues raised over "whether there is a coherent 'sector' at all, and if so what it should be called".

== Significance to society and the economy ==
The presence of a large non-profit sector is sometimes seen as an indicator of a healthy economy in local and national financial measurements. With a growing number of non-profit organizations focused on social services, the environment, education, and other unmet needs throughout society, the nonprofit sector is increasingly central to the health and well-being of society. Peter Drucker suggests that the nonprofit sector provides an excellent outlet for a variety of society's labor and skills. In 1976, Daniel Bell predicted that the third sector would become the predominant sector in society, as the knowledge class overcame the effects of the private sector.

The first two decades of the 20th century were characterized by a public zeal for social reform and social justice known as the Progressive Era. The newly founded National Association of Societies for Organizing Charity had immediate influence during that era. Its extensive field work helped organize new societies and strengthen others. Smaller cities became well-organized, with the South and Northwest particular areas of focus. To permit membership of Canadian societies, the association changed its name in 1912 to the American Association of Societies for Organizing Charity. In 1917, it became the American Association for Organizing Charity. These agencies increasingly were providing direct service to individuals and families. Pauperism, child welfare, juvenile justice, sanitation, tuberculosis, and other health issues were emergent problems for new and existing agencies. The American Red Cross fueled a nationwide fervor for social service. Founded in the United States in 1881, it was reorganized in 1905 to focus on military personnel. With this pivotal decision, the business of organizing charities quickly evolved into the business of social work.

According to a recent study by Johns Hopkins University, the Netherlands has the largest third sector of 20 countries across Europe. Ireland's non-profit fundraised income formed 0.33% of Irish GDP, less than the UK and US, in 2016. In Sweden, the nonprofit sector is attributed with fostering a nationwide social change towards progressive economic, social and cultural policies, while in Italy the third sector is increasingly viewed as a primary employment source for the entire country.

In the United States, approximately 10% of GDP is attributable to the third sector. Donating to private religious organizations remains the most popular American cause, and all religious organizations are entirely privately funded because the government is limited from establishing or prohibiting a religion under the First Amendment.

== Sub-sectors ==
Although the voluntary, community, and not-for-personal-profit sectors are frequently taken to compose the "Third Sector", each of these sectors or sub-sectors have quite different characteristics. The community sector is assumed to comprise volunteers (unpaid) while the voluntary sector is considered to employ staff working for a social or community purpose: "hence the phrase 'voluntary and community sector' (VCS) [is used] to encompass the full range". In addition however, the not-for-personal-profit sector is also considered to include social firms (such as cooperatives and mutuals) and more recently governmental institutions (such as Housing Associations) that have been spun off from government, although still operating fundamentally as public service delivery organizations. These other types of institutions may be considered to be quasi-private or quasi-public sectors rather than stemming from direct community benefit motivations. Other sub-divisions within the overall voluntary sector include distinctions as to purpose, such as social care, child care, animal welfare, sport, cultural development and environmental protection; organisations with religious roots; organisations which operate on a national basis such as Mind in England and Wales; and organisations with a solely local presence.

== Concerns ==
The entry of nonprofit organizations into commercial activities (competing with the private sector) was identified in the 1980s. There have also been concerns about the financial accountability of the nonprofit sector throughout Western society. There is also ongoing concern whether the nonprofit sector will unequally draw retiring workers from the private sector as the currently large baby boomers age. Development of the third sector, it is argued, is linked to the restructuring of the welfare state and further globalization of that process through neo-liberal strategies of the Washington consensus.

In a 2013 New York Times op-ed and radio podcast, The Charitable-Industrial Complex, Peter Buffett uses the terms "philanthropic colonialism" and "conscience laundering", and describes his insights into "searching for answers with their right hand to problems that others in the room have created with their left" rather than systemic change.

== Country-specific ==
=== France ===
Discourse on the "third sector" began in the 1970s in France as a result of the crisis in the welfare state. Many associations rely at least partly on government subsidies or other payments. This has been criticized at times by association heads among others as a way to control charities; some charities allegedly do refuse all government payments, while others try to rely partly on the government’s aid.

=== India ===
In India, this sector is commonly called the "joint sector", and includes the industries run in partnership by the state and private Sector. In a wider sense the initial investment is made by the state and later the handling is done by the private sector. But here the private sector is responsible to the state when it comes to handling.

=== Israel ===
In Israel, this sector is commonly called the "Third Sector", (Hebrew: המגזר השלישי) and generally refers to non-profit organizations (NPOs) and non-governmental organizations (NGOs) with the line between the two quite fine. These organizations generally fill a gap in the existing government or municipal service provision. Examples include United Hatzalah for emergency medical first response, Yad Sarah for free loan of medical equipment, Yad Eliezer for poverty relief efforts, Akim for assistance for the mentally handicapped, and SHALVA for children with special needs.

=== United Kingdom ===
The Cabinet Office of the British government until 2010 had an Office of the Third Sector that defined the "third sector" as "the place between State and (the) private sector". The Conservative/Liberal Democrat Coalition Government renamed the department the Office for Civil Society. The term third sector has now been replaced in Government usage by the term Civil Society, or for a while under the Cameron government, the term Big Society, which was devised by political advisers and which featured prominently in the Conservative Party's 2010 election campaign.

Organisations leading and supporting the voluntary sector in the United Kingdom include the Association of Chief Executives of Voluntary Organisations (Acevo), the National Council for Voluntary Organisations, Northern Ireland Council for Voluntary Action, Scottish Council for Voluntary Organisations, and Wales Council for Voluntary Action.

=== United States ===
The U.S. nonprofit sector consisted of approximately 1.56 million organizations registered with the Internal Revenue Service in 2015. These reporting nonprofits identified $2.54 trillion in revenues and $5.79 trillion in assets in 2015. Over $400 billion in revenue comes through private support and fundraising. The U.S. nonprofit sector contributed an estimated $985.4 billion to the U.S. economy in 2015, composing 5.4 percent of the country's gross domestic product and employed 11 percent of the U.S. workforce in 2015. Each year, seven out of ten Americans donate to at least one charitable cause. Contributions are from two to 20 times higher in the U.S. than in other countries of comparable wealth and modernity.

== See also ==
- Advocacy group
- Foundation (nonprofit organization)
- International organization
- Mission-based organization
- Philanthropy
- Social economy
- Social entrepreneurship
- Social threefolding
- Unionization in the nonprofit sector
- Voluntaryism
- Volunteerism
- Community Sector Coalition
- The Citizens Advice service
