= Palestinian enclaves =

Self-governing Palestinian areas in the Israeli-occupied West Bank

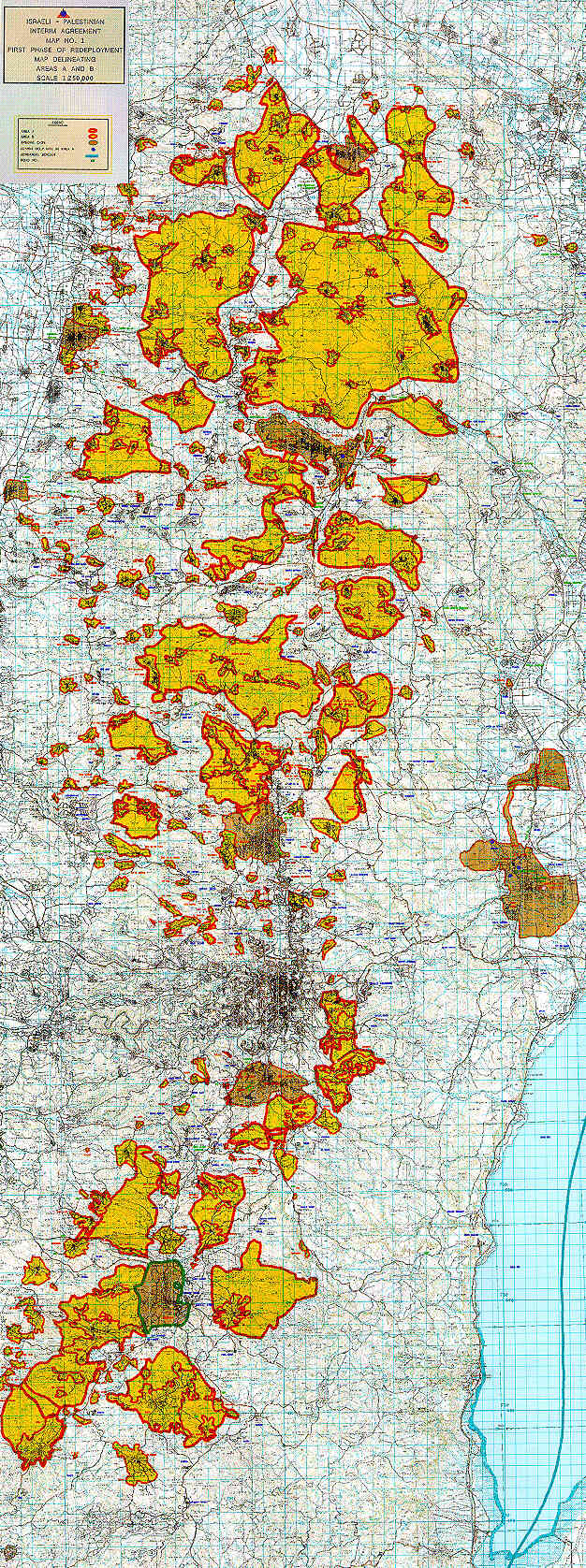
Area A and B under the Oslo II Accord

The Palestinian enclaves are areas in the West Bank designated for Palestinians under a variety of unsuccessful U.S. and Israeli-led proposals to end the Israeli–Palestinian conflict. The enclaves are often compared to the nominally self-governing black homelands created in apartheid-era South Africa, (Note: "Faced with widely drawn international parallels between the West Bank and the Bantustans of apartheid South Africa, senior figures in Mr Netanyahu's Likud party have begun to admit the danger." (Stephens 2013); "They explain the parallels between the fragmented Palestinian enclosures in the West Bank and Gaza Strip and the Bantustans in apartheid era South Africa. They argue that a Palestinian state composed of these isolated enclosures would be both illegitimate and unviable" (Clarno 2017, p. 4); "The relationship in question is the one between Israel and South Africa's former Bantustans, in particular Bophuthatswana. That this relationship has been forgotten is all the more surprising given the parallels between South Africa's apartheid policy and Israel's treatment of Palestinians, as well as between South Africa's Bantustan strategy and Israel's carving up of the Palestinian territories." (Lissoni 2015, Ch.4); "Palestine's fragments do resemble the spatial array of the Bantustans in South Africa." (Peteet 2017, p. 63); "The archipelago of Palestinian enclaves proposed by Trump—subordinate to Israeli security concerns and more akin to the "bantustans" of apartheid-era South Africa—is emphatically not that." (Tharoor 2020); "Fragmenting the Palestinian territory into fenced-in enclaves resembles the grand apartheid Bantustan policy of pretending that noncontiguous patches of land could eventually constitute viable independent states. Impoverished and overcrowded under corrupt and unpopular authoritarian rulers, these 'homelands' in both cases were—and are—doomed to fail in fulfilling the aspirations of their populations. In addition, when two sets of laws apply to residents of the same territory (as is the case for Israeli settlers and Palestinians), then this differential treatment amounts to apartheid." (Adam & Moodley 2005, p. 104)) and are thus referred to as bantustans. (Note: Also contracted as "Palutustans". "The experience of the past four decades puts a question mark over this assumption. If a Palestinian state is not established, Israel will most likely continue to administer the area, possibly allotting crumbs of sovereignty to Palestinian groups in areas that will continue to function as 'Palutustans' (Palestinian Bantustans)." Francis Boyle, former Amnesty International USA board member and legal advisor to the Palestinians in Madrid (1991–1993), and presently professor of International Law at the University of Illinois College of Law, after describing the process of peace negotiations as designed to create a Bantustan for Palestinians, argued that historically, it was Western imperial colonial powers, whose policies in his view had been racist and genocidal that, in creating Israel, had effectively established what was a Bantustan for the Jewish people themselves, an entity he called "Jewistan".) (Note: "Palestinians noted that Israel's proposal for the West Bank left Palestinians with three unconnected cantons (often referred to pejoratively as "Bantustans"), each surrounded by Israeli territory." (Robinson 2018, p. 292); "Oslo thus transformed Palestinian cities into enclaves, which are often referred to as Bantustans to invoke explicit comparison with the Apartheid geography of South Africa" (Harker 2020, Ch.2); "each segment of the "state" would be further subdivided into enclaves ("Bantustans", as they have been widely called) by the Israeli settlements, highways and military positions." (Slater 2020, p. 256); "Even the term "bantustan" that is frequently applied to Palestinian enclaves like Gaza is, after all, an explicit reference to the little "homelands" with which South Africa experimented at one point in order to artificially reduce its black population." (Makdisi 2012, p. 291)) They have been referred to figuratively as the Palestinian archipelago, (Note: "In 2009, French artist Julien Bousac designed a map of the West Bank titled L'archipel de Palestine orientale, or 'The Archipelago of Eastern Palestine'... Bousac's map illustrates — via a military and a tourist imaginary — how the US-brokered Oslo Accords fragmented the West Bank into enclaves separated by checkpoints and settlements that maintain Israeli control over the West Bank and circumscribe the majority of the Palestinian population to shrinking Palestinian city and village centers." (Kelly 2016, pp. 723–745); "an archipelago of enclaves" (Peteet 2016, p. 256); (Barak 2005, pp. 719–736); (Baylouny 2009, pp. 39–68)) among other terms. The de facto status in 2026 is that Israel controls all area outside these enclaves.

The "islands" first took official form as Areas A and B under the 1995 Oslo II Accord. This arrangement was explicitly intended to be temporary, with Area C (the rest of the West Bank) to "be gradually transferred to Palestinian jurisdiction" by 1997; however, no such transfer was made. (Note: "In the West Bank Israel has managed to turn the governorates there into Bantustans only connected through an Israeli controlled (Area C) territory." (ITAN 2015, p. 889)) The area of the West Bank currently under partial civil control of the Palestinian National Authority is composed of 165 "islands". (Note: "90 percent of the population of the West Bank was divided into 165 islands of ostensible PA control." (Thrall 2017, p. 144)) The creation of this arrangement has been described by Israeli journalist Amira Hass as "the most outstanding geopolitical occurrence of the past quarter century". (Note: "The reality of the Palestinian Bantustans, reservations or enclaves — is a fact on the ground. Their creation is the most outstanding geopolitical occurrence of the past quarter century." (Hass 2018))

A number of Israeli-U.S. peace plans, including the Allon Plan, the Drobles World Zionist Organization plan, Menachem Begin's plan, Benjamin Netanyahu's "Allon Plus" plan, the 2000 Camp David Summit, and Sharon's vision of a Palestinian state have proposed an enclave-type territory – i.e. a group of non-contiguous areas surrounded, divided, and, ultimately, controlled by Israel; (Note: "Israel responded to the second intifada with a strategy of collective punishment aimed at a return to the logic of Oslo, whereby a weak Palestinian leadership would acquiesce to Israeli demands and a brutalized population would be compelled to accept a "state" made up of a series of Bantustans. Though the language may have changed slightly, the same structure that has characterized past plans remains. The Allon plan, the WZO plan, the Begin plan, Netanyahu's "Allon Plus" plan, Barak's "generous offer," and Sharon's vision of a Palestinian state all foresaw Israeli control of significant West Bank territory, a Palestinian existence on minimal territory surrounded, divided, and, ultimately, controlled by Israel, and a Palestinian or Arab entity that would assume responsibility for internal policing and civil matters." (Cook & Hanieh 2006, pp. 346–347)) (Note: "The 1968 Allon Plan called for placing settlements in sparsely populated lands of the Jordan River Valley, thus ensuring Jewish demographic presence in the farthest location within biblical Israel... the 1978 Drobles Plan... which called for a "belt of settlements in strategic locations ... throughout the whole land of Israel... for security and by right." The logic of the Drobles Plan actually guided the wave of settlements that occurred in the 1990s, thus turning the settlements into an integral element of Israel's tactical control over and surveillance of Palestinians in the West Bank. The Allon and Drobles Plans and other similar colonization campaigns have invariably been motivated by five broad, interrelated reasons driving the settlement enterprise. They include control over economic resources, use of territory as a strategic asset, ensuring demographic presence and geographic control, reasserting control over the Jew's biblically promised homeland, and having exclusive rights to the territory".(Kamrava 2016, pp. 79–80).) as has the more recent Trump peace plan. This has been referred to as the "Bantustan option". (Note: "Therefore, the Bantustan option of minimizing effective Palestinian statehood to dispersed smaller parts of the West Bank and Gaza, and reversing the Oslo Accord, appeals to influential Israeli planners" (Adam & Moodley 2005, p. 104); "This says that through Oslo and recognition Israel has succeeded in replacing one form of occupation with another – the bantustan option." (Usher 1999, p. 35); "...much of the American political establishment, the Israeli establishment and the Palestinian establishment (who are mainly affiliated with the Palestinian Authority) are working to produce the Bantustan option – a series of non-contiguous Palestinian cantons in the West Bank governed by a corrupt elite subset of society. It is very likely that before the one-state solution is fully developed, the Bantustan option will be established in the West Bank." (Loewenstein & Moor 2013, p. 14))

The consequences of the creation of these fragmented Palestinian areas has been studied widely, and has been shown to have had a "devastating impact on the economy, social networks, [and] the provision of basic services such as healthcare and education". (Note: The consequences of the spatial regime being consolidated in the occupied West Bank today, a result of the Israeli policy variously characterized as Bantustanization, cantonization, enclavization, and ghettoization, have been discussed at length in recent years. A tremendous outpouring of documentation and reporting, analysis, opinion, and activism has been devoted to this issue; monitoring by international, Palestinian, and Israeli agencies and organizations has shown the policy of fragmentation's devastating impact on the economy, social networks, the provision of basic services such as healthcare and education, and the prospects for an end to Israel's colonization of the West Bank and Gaza (Taraki 2008, p. 6).)

== Names ==
=== Enclaves, cantons or archipelago ===
A variety of terms are used by Palestinians and outside observers to describe these spaces, including "enclaves", (Note: "The term enclave can seem neutral, unlike Bantustan and ghetto, which are freighted with negative connotations. Yet enclaves are socio-spatial formations that similarly arrange inequality. Gulag captures the arbitrariness of some of closure's mechanisms; but economic factors limit comparisons with the ghetto. The economic integrations, however unequal, of Jews in pre-WWII European ghettos, of blacks in the ghettos of the United States, and of the Bantustans in South Africa, is not paralleled in Palestinian enclaves, where circulation outside and between their confines is severely circumscribed." (Peteet 2017, p. 62)) "cantons", (Note: "the original South African model is particularly tempting. It would be a mistake to use the term "canton" in this case, since cantons are autonomous areas of a state and its citizens. Here, the idea is to turn those Palestinians living in areas that would be annexed to Israel, into foreign citizens." (Primor 2002)) "open-air prisons", (Note: "The terms "enclaves", "cantons", "Bantustans" and "open-air prisons" are used by Palestinians and outside observers to describe these spaces...The enclaves contain a population expelled but still within the territory of the state; they are neither camps, detention centers, nor Bantustans. Although certainly lodged in the same analytical field of other spatial devices of containment, they are unique spatial formations that we have yet to develop tools to conceptualize." (Peteet 2016, p. 268)) reservations, or, collectively, a "ghetto state"; (Note: "The evolution from ghetto state to state is a largely unrecognized (and thus unstudied) path to statehood. The very function of the ghetto state in concentrating, restricting and defining its population can become the territorial and organizational basis for the emergence of a state (versus merely a political party). Prominent examples of this process would include the Bantustans of South Africa and the Israeli "occupied territories" of the West Bank and Gaza Strip." (McColl & Newman 1992, p. 334)) while "islands" or "archipelago" is considered to communicate how the infrastructure of the Israeli occupation of the West Bank has disrupted contiguity between Palestinian areas. "Swiss cheese" is another popular analogy. Of these terms, "enclaves", "cantons" and archipelago (Note: "The dominant security modality in the Occupied Palestinian Territories (OPT) nowadays is the coexistence of an archipelago and enclaves. In the archipelago, people and goods move relatively freely and smoothly. The enclaves, however, are spaces of exception where the rule of law and the emergency procedure merge into indistinction." (Ghandour-Demiri 2016)) have also been applied to the pattern of Jewish settlements in the West Bank. The Encyclopedia of the Israeli–Palestinian Conflict entry for "Bantustan" says that they also are called "cantons or enclaves" and makes use of the word "fragmentation" in its analysis as of 2006.

The process of creating the fragmented enclaves has also been described as "encystation" by international relations scholar Glenn Bowman and as "enclavization" by geographer Ghazi Falah. According to a report commissioned for the United Nations Development Programme (UNDP),

Israel has systematically segregated Palestinians communities into a series of archipelagos (referred to variously as isolated islands, enclaves, cantons, and Bantustans) under an arrangement referred to as 'one of the most intensively territorialized control systems ever created'.

=== Bantustans ===
The enclaves are often referred to as "bantustans", particularly but not exclusively by those critical of Israeli policy towards Palestinians, (Note: But relegating the Palestinians to self-government in confined areas—places Israeli critics have likened to "bantustans"—could close the door to a viable state, forcing Israel to choose between granting Palestinians citizenship and leaving them in an apartheid like second-class status indefinitely (Halbfinger & Rasgon 2020).) in reference to the territories set aside for black inhabitants in Apartheid South Africa. The label implies that the areas lack meaningful political sovereignty and economic independence. (Note: Ariel Sharon, Israel's Prime Minister since 2001, had long contended that the Bantustan model, so central to the apartheid system, is the most appropriate to the present Israeli–Palestinian conflict. Others, by contrast, have maintained that the Palestinian territories have been transformed into cantons whose final status is still to be determined. The difference in terminology between cantons and Bantustans is not arbitrary though. The former suggests a neutral territorial concept whose political implications and contours are left to be determined. The latter indicates a structural development with economic and political implications that put in jeopardy the prospects for any meaningfully sovereign viable Palestinian state. It makes the prospects for a binational state seem inevitable, if most threatening to the notion of ethnic nationalism.' (Farsakh 2005, p. 231)) According to Professor Julie Peteet, Chair of the Department of Anthropology at the University of Louisville, the Israeli government's overall hafrada policy of separation, "exemplified in Jewish settlements, Palestinian enclaves, land expropriation, checkpoints, segregated roads, and the permit system" is a parallel to South African apartheid's pass system, land policies, and Bantustans.

Usage of the term bantustans to describe the Palestinian areas has been traced back to the 1960s including by Israeli military leader and politician Moshe Dayan, who reportedly suggested bantustans as an explicit model for the Palestinian enclaves. (Note: General Dayan has said that a sort of Arab "Bantustan" should be created with control of internal affairs, leaving Israel with defence, security and foreign affairs. Mr. Ben-Gurion has boldly recommended a large-scale Jewish settlement in Hebron (Brogan 1967).) Other Israelis and Americans who have used similar terminology in various contexts include Ariel Sharon (reportedly), (Note: "Just as in the Palestinian territories, blacks and colored people in South Africa were given limited autonomy in the country's least fertile areas. Those who remained outside these isolated enclaves, which were disconnected from each other, received the status of foreign workers, without civil rights. A few years ago, Italian Foreign Minister Massimo D'Alema told Israeli friends that shortly before he was elected prime minister, Sharon told him that the bantustan plan was the most suitable solution to our conflict."; "Sharon's conception of a Palestinian 'state' is in fact very akin to the sub-sovereign Bantustan model of apartheid South Africa, a comparison which he is reported to make in private.") Colin Powell, James Baker, (Note: also available here (Telhami 2010, p. 83a)) John Dugard, Martin Indyk, (Note: "The Trump plan would thereby surround the Palestinian state with Israeli territory, severing its contiguity with Jordan and turning Jericho into a Palestinian enclave and the Palestinian state into a Bantustan. ... The result would be a Swiss cheese Palestinian state with no possibility of territorial contiguity. Instead, the Trump plan proposes 'transportational' contiguity, through tunnels that would connect the islands of Palestinian sovereignty. Those tunnels, of course, would be under Israeli control." (Indyk 2020)) Daniel Levy, Amos Elon, Yigal Allon, I. F. Stone, (Note: "...it would be better to give the West Bank back to Jordan than to try to create a puppet state — a kind of Arab Bantustan — consigning the Arabs to second-class status under Israel's control. This would only foster Arab resentment. To avoid giving the Arabs first-class citizenship by putting them in the reservation of a second-class state is too transparently clever." (Stone 1967)) Avi Primor, Ze'ev Schiff, Meron Benvenisti, Yuval Shany, Menachem Klein, and Akiva Eldar. (Note: "Alongside the severance of Gaza from the West Bank, a policy now called 'isolation,' the Sharon-Peres government and the Olmert-Peres government that succeeded it carried out the bantustan program in the West Bank. The Jordan Valley was separated from the rest of the West Bank; the south was severed from the north; and all three areas were severed from East Jerusalem. The "two states for two peoples" plan gave way to a 'five states for two peoples' plan: one contiguous state, surrounded by settlement blocs, for Israel, and four isolated enclaves for the Palestinians." (Eldar 2007)) The verbal noun "bantustanization" was first used by Azmi Bishara in 1995, though Yassir Arafat had made the analogy earlier in peace talks to his interlocutors. Many researchers and writers from the Israeli left used it in the early 2000s, for example with Meron Benvenisti referring in 2004 to the territorial, political and economic fragmentation model being pursued by the Israeli government.

== History ==
=== Israeli planning in the West Bank before Oslo ===
The 1967 Allon Plan

After the 1967 Six-Day War, a small group of officers and senior Israeli officials advocated that Israel unilaterally plan for a Palestinian mini-state or "canton", in the north of the West Bank. (Note: "During the early days of the occupation a handful of senior Israeli officials and army officers advocated unilateral plans for a Palestinian satellite mini-state, autonomous region, or "canton" — Bantustan actually — in the northern half of the West Bank, but the policymakers would have none of this." (Raz 2020, p. 278)) Policymakers did not implement this cantonal plan at the time. Defense minister Moshe Dayan said that Israel should keep the West Bank and Gaza Strip, arguing that a "sort of Arab 'bantustan' should be created with control of internal affairs, leaving Israel with defence, security and foreign affairs". Just weeks after the war, American Jewish intellectual I. F. Stone wrote that giving the West Bank back to Jordan would be better than creating "a puppet state — a kind of Arab Bantustan".

==== Allon Plan ====
In early 1968, Yigal Allon, the Israeli minister after whom the 1967 Allon Plan is named, proposed reformulating his plan by transferring some Palestinian areas back to Jordan. According to the plan, Israel would annex most of the Jordan Valley, from the river to the eastern slopes of the West Bank hill ridge, East Jerusalem, and the Etzion bloc while the heavily populated areas of the West Bank hill country, together with a corridor that included Jericho, would be offered to Jordan. Allon's intention was to create a zone deemed necessary for security reasons between Israel and Jordan and set up an "eastern column" of agricultural settlements. The plan would have annexed about 35 percent of the West Bank with few Palestinians.

In Allon's view, if Israel did not give back the Palestinian lands that were not supposed to be annexed for Israeli settlement to that country, it would have to leave Palestinians with an autonomy under Israeli rule. This, he argued, would lead observers to conclude that Israel had set up an arrangement akin to "some kind of South African Bantustan". (Note: "Palestinian autonomy under Israeli rule, he added, 'would be identified as... some kind of South African Bantustan'." (Gorenberg 2006, p. 153; Cook 2013))

==== 1968 Jerusalem plan ====
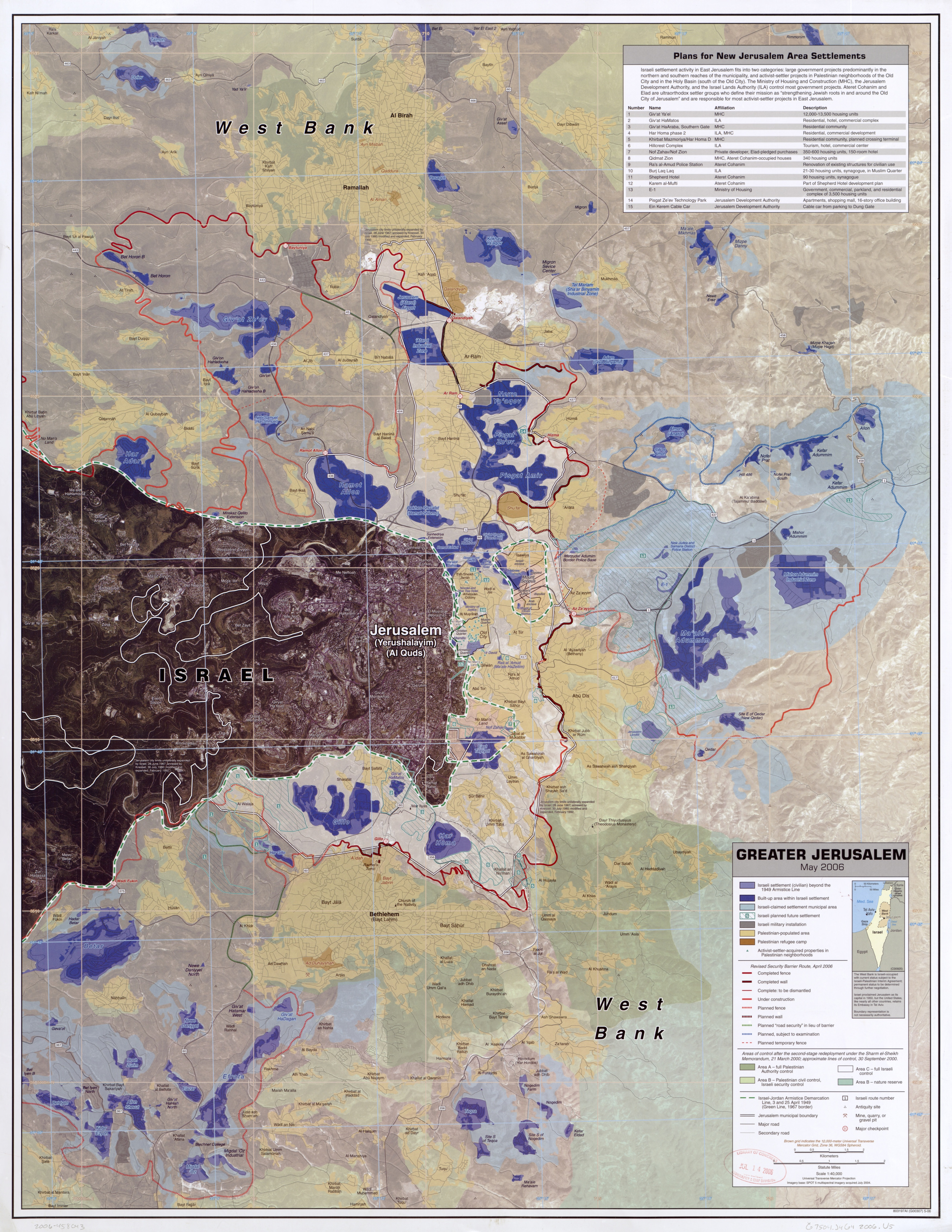
Jerusalem area, May 2006.

On 27 June 1967, Israel expanded the municipal boundaries of West Jerusalem so as to include approximately 70 km^{2} (27.0 sq mi) of West Bank territory today referred to as East Jerusalem, which included Jordanian East Jerusalem (6 km^{2} (2.3 sq mi)) and 28 villages and areas of the Bethlehem and Beit Jala municipalities (64 km^{2} (25 sq mi)).

The master plan set the objective of ensuring the "unification of Jerusalem" and preventing it from being divided in the future. Pursuant to this and subsequent plans, twelve Israeli settlements were established in such a way as to "complete a belt of built fabric that enveloped and bisected the Palestinian neighborhoods and villages annexed to the city." The plan called for the construction of Jewish neighbourhoods in stages, which started shortly after the Six-Day War. In particular, the new settlements of Ramot Eshkol, French Hill and Givat HaMivtar closed the gap in the northern parts of the city. The second stage took place in the 1970s and early 1980s, when Ramot and Neve Ya'akov in the north and Gilo and East Talpiot in the south were built. The third stage included Pisgat Ze'ev in 1980 and the creation of the "outer security belt", which consisted of Ma'ale Adumim (1977), Givon (1981) and Efrat (1983), built on high ground and next to strategic roads in the Palestinian area. The most recent endeavours included the construction of Har Homa (1991) and the so far unsuccessful attempts to connect Ma'ale Adumim with other Israeli settlements in East Jerusalem.

==== Drobles and Sharon plans ====
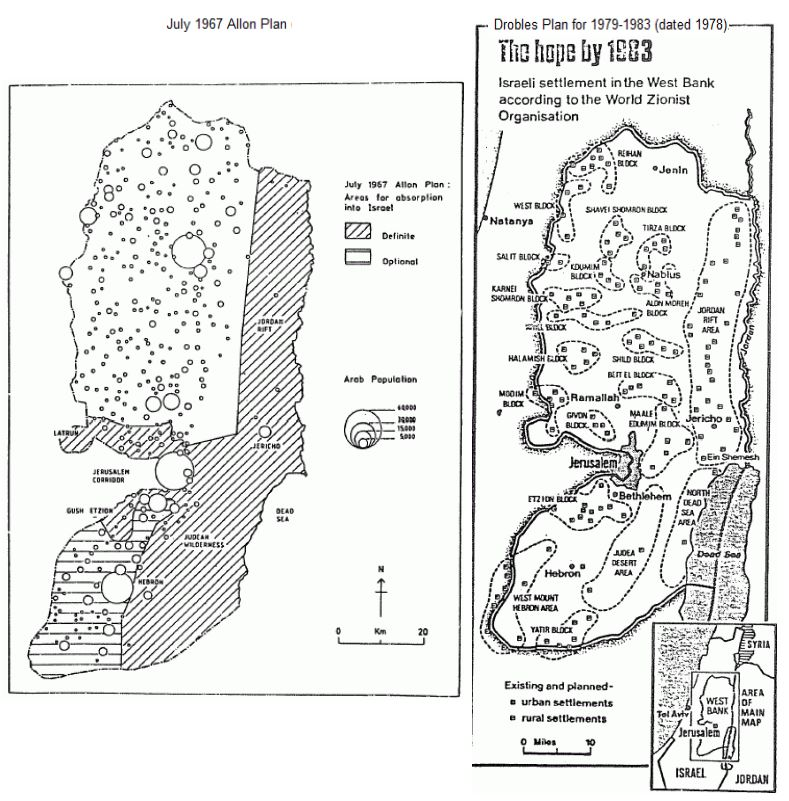
1967 Allon Plan and 1978 Drobles Plan

Ariel Sharon was the primary figure behind Likud's policy for Israeli settlements in the Palestinian territories for decades, and is widely regarded as its main architect. According to Ron Nachman, Sharon had been thinking about the issue of settlement in the conquered territories since 1973, and his map of settlement, outlined in 1978, had not essentially changed by the time he implemented the Separation Barrier.

In September 1977, in the first Likud government, Ariel Sharon took over the Ministerial Committee for Settlement and announced the first in a series of plans for new settlements. (Note: Called the Wachman (Avraham Wachman, a professor of architecture) or Wachman-Sharon plan) This was to be organized via a web of blocks of settlements of different sizes situated on the mountain ridges throughout the West Bank in and around Palestinian cities and villages. Sharon thought the Allon plan insufficient unless the high terrain was also fortified.

Later, Sharon's plans were adopted as the "Master Plan for the Development of Settlement in Judea and Samaria for the Years 1979–1983", authored by Matityahu Drobles on behalf of the Settlement Division of the World Zionist Organization in 1979. In 1982, Sharon, then Minister of Defence, published his master plan for Jewish Settlements in the West Bank Through the Year 2010 which became known as the Sharon Plan.

These plans – the Allon, Drobles and Sharon master plans, as well as the Hundred Thousand plan, which has never been officially acknowledged – were the blueprint for the West Bank Israeli settlements. According to professor Saeed Rahnema, these plans envisaged "the establishment of settlements on the hilltops surrounding Palestinian towns and villages and the creation of as many Palestinian enclaves as possible" while many aspects formed the basis of all the failed "peace plans" that ensued.

=== The Road to Oslo ===
According to Avi Primor, the former deputy director-general of Israel's Foreign Ministry's department for Africa, Asia and Oceania, who was an ambassador and vice president of Tel Aviv University at the time of writing in 2002, in the top echelons of the Israeli security establishment in the 1970s and 1980s there was widespread empathy for South Africa's apartheid system and it was particularly interested in that country's resolution of the demographic issue by inventing bantustan "homelands" for various groups of the indigenous black population. (Note: "Many in the top echelons of the security establishment in the 1970s and 1980s had a warm spot in their hearts for the white apartheid regime in South Africa that was derived not only from utilitarian interests, but also from sympathy for the white minority rulers in that country. One of the elements of the old South African regime that stirred much interest in Israel remains current to this day: To seemingly solve the demographic problem that troubled the white South Africans (that is, to hang on to all of South Africa without granting equal rights, civil rights and the vote to blacks), the South African regime created a fiction known by the name Bantustans, later changed to Homelands." (Primor 2002)) Pro-Palestinian circles and scholars, despite the secrecy of the tacit alliance between Israel and South Africa, were familiar with ongoing arrangements between the two in military and nuclear matters, though the thriving cooperation between Israel and the Bophuthatswana Bantustan themselves was a subject that remained neglected until recently, when South Africa's archives began to be opened up.

==== Autonomy ====
By the early 1970s, Arabic-language magazines began to compare the Israeli proposals for a Palestinian autonomy to the Bantustan strategy of South Africa, In January 1978, Palestine Liberation Organization (PLO) leader Yasser Arafat criticized a peace offering from Menachem Begin as "less than Bantustans". (Note: "What is Begin offering us now? Bantustans. Even less than Bantustans; Swaziland has more rights than we would have" (Arafat 1978)) The September 1978 Camp David accords included provision for the Palestinians, who did not participate, based on Begin's 1977 Plan for the West Bank and Gaza Strip.

==== Hundred Thousand plan ====
Published in 1983, the "Master Plan for Settlement for Judea and Samaria, Development Plan for the Region for 1983-1986", co-authored by the Ministry of Agriculture and the Settlement Division of the World Zionist Organisation, aimed at attracting 80,000 Israelis to live in 43 new Israeli settlements (for which up to 450 km of new roads were to be paved) in order to raise the total settler population to 100,000 by 2010.

In late 1984, some embarrassment was caused when the Israeli settlement of Ariel in the West Bank paired itself as a sister city with Bisho, the capital of the ostensibly independent Bantustan of Ciskei. (Note: Ciskei's Israeli representative Yosef Schneider, during the pairing ceremony, remarked, "It is symbolic that no country in the world (except South Africa) recognizes Ciskei, just as there is no country in the world that recognizes the Jewish settlements in Judea and Samaria" (Hunter 1987, pp. 72–80, 74).) Shortly afterwards, Shimon Peres, the new Prime Minister of a Labour-Likud national coalition government, condemned apartheid as an "idiotic system".

==== Intifada (1987 to 1991) ====
In 1984 elections, Labor and Likud, on opposite sides of the debate over territorial compromise, were forced into coalition and any thought of land for peace tabled. In the 1980s, Sharon used coercive measures to control the population such as curfews, destruction of homes and the uprooting of trees, a policy reaffirmed in 1985 by Yitzhak Rabin. These Israeli settlements constituted a "creeping de facto annexation" that fed Palestinian discontent. In 1985, the National Conference of Black Lawyers in the United States compiled a report, entitled Bantustans in the Holy Land, making the analogy with what was taking place in the West Bank. The term was controversial at the time, but 15 years later, an American comparative law scholar and Africanist, Adrien Wing wrote that events in the ensuing decade and a half regarding the way territory was being regulated seemed to support the cogency of the analogy. By late 1987 tensions had sharpened and the Intifada began. In 1988, Jordan surrendered any claim to Palestine and the Palestinian National Council proclaimed the State of Palestine. Sharon announced the Seven Stars plan in 1991, calling for settlements on the Green Line, with the declared intention of its consequent eradication and the 1992 Meretz-Sheves plan contemplated four Palestinian cantons divided by zones of Jewish settlement and later evolved as a plan to annex all major settlement blocs along with three "autonomous Palestinian enclaves", which Catriona Drew, a professor of international law at the University of London, described as the "Bantustanization" of a "self-determination unit". The Intifada lost impetus after the Madrid Conference of 1991 that brought together Israeli and Palestinian representatives for the first time since 1949 and in 1992, Rabin pledged to halt settlement expansion and began secret talks with the PLO.

=== Oslo Accords ===
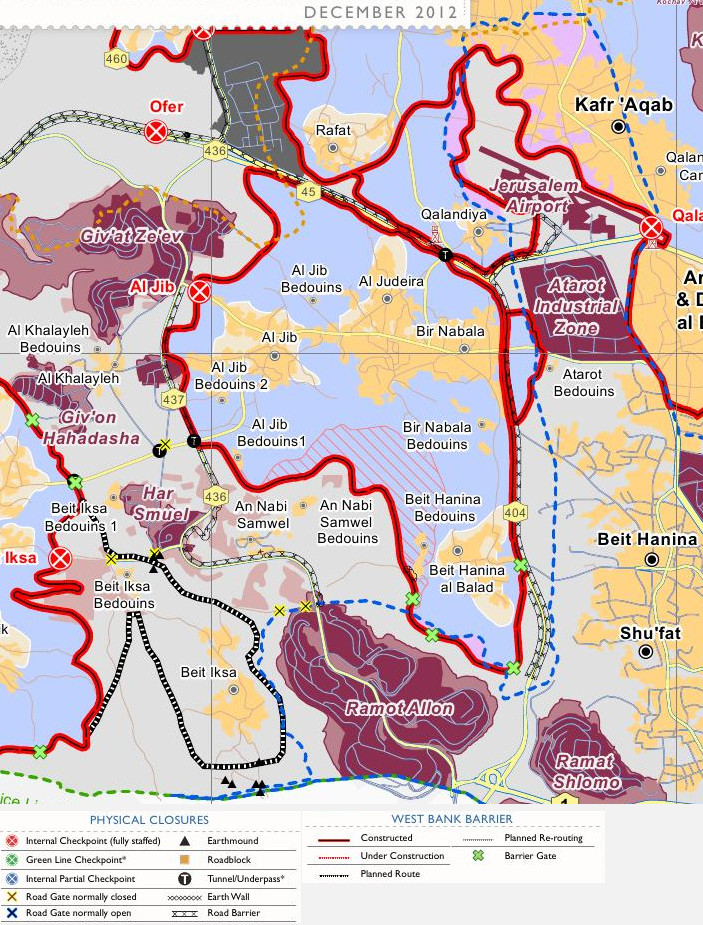
Some enclaves are entirely surrounded by the Israeli West Bank barrier, such as Bir Nabala and Qalandia.

Soon after the joint signing of the Oslo I Accord on 13 September 1993, Yassir Arafat and Shimon Peres engaged in follow-up negotiations at the UNESCO summit held in December that year in Granada. Arafat was incensed at what he saw as the impossible terms rigidly set by Peres regarding Israeli control of border exits with Jordan, stating that what he was being asked to sign off on resembled a bantustan. (Note: "It will be the end of me. I can't go for a Bantustan. Don't push me into a corner, my back's already against the wall. How will I tell my people that you control every entry, from every direction? I'm not in power because of a popular majority, but thanks to the personal credit I've accumulated. For me, this is a disaster, a catastrophe." (Gil 2020, p. 163)) This, Peres insisted, was what had been agreed to at Oslo. Subsequently, on 4 May 1994, Israel and the PLO signed the Gaza–Jericho Agreement that stipulated arrangements for the withdrawal of Israeli troops from both named areas. Azmi Bishara commented in 1995 that the model envisaged for Gaza was a Bantustan, one even more restrictive in its implications and scope than the ones existing in South Africa, and that Oslo was applying that model to the West Bank. (Note: "The Gaza model is a bantustan... even more restricted than in the bantustans of South Africa, where at least you could travel to work... It is a bantustan with one gate that can be opened and closed any time Israel chooses... Gaza is the model for the West Bank... It is investing millions of dollars for an infrastructure of roads that will link up most of the Jewish settlements and fragment the Palestinian 'areas' into so many townships. At the end of the day, we can call these townships a state if we wish... But the reality is bantustanisation... As for the Israelis, [the idea of bi-nationalism] will force them to address the meaning and challenge of equality. Why? Because the bantustanisation option may defer resolution of the Palestinian question, but it cannot, in the end, be the resolution." (Bishara & Usher 1995, p. 47)) This in turn was taken to signal that the same model would be applied in the future to the West Bank, as with Jericho.

The 1995 Oslo II Accord formalized the fragmentation of the West Bank, allotting to the Palestinians over 60 disconnected islands; (Note: "In any case, what was on offer at Oslo was a territorially discontinuous Palestinian Bantustan (divided into over sixty disconnected fragments) that would have had no control over water resources, borders, or airspace, much less an independent economy, currency, or financial system, and whose sovereignty, nominal as it was, would be punctuated by heavily fortified Israeli colonies and an autonomous Jewish road network, all of which would be effectively under Israeli army control. Even this, however, was never realized." (Makdisi 2005, pp. 443–461)) by the end of 1999 the West Bank had been divided into 227 separate entities, most of which were smaller than 2 km^{2} (0.77 mi^{2}) (about half the size of New York's Central Park). (Note: "By December 1999, the Gaza Strip had been divided into three cantons and the West Bank into 227, the majority of which were no larger than two square kilometers in size. Both areas were effectively severed from East Jerusalem. While Palestinians maintained control over many of the cantons and were promised authority over more if not most, Israel maintained jurisdiction over the land areas in between the cantons, which in effect gave Israel control over all the land and its disposition. Hence, the actual amount of land under Palestinian authority proved far less important than the way that land was arranged and controlled." (Roy 2004, pp. 365–403)) These areas, composing what is known as Area A (c.1,005 km^{2} (388 mi^{2}); 17.7% of the West Bank) and Area B (c.1,035 km^{2} (400 mi^{2}); 18.3% of the West Bank), formalized the legal limitation to urban expansion of Palestinian populated areas outside of these fragments. While these arrangements were agreed at Oslo to be temporary, with the rest of the West Bank to "be gradually transferred to Palestinian jurisdiction" by 1997, no such transfers were ever made.

==== Oslo maps ====
The Oslo map has been called the "Swiss cheese" map, in reference to the multiple holes ("eyes") in Emmental cheese. The Palestinian negotiators at Oslo were not shown the Israeli map until 24 hours before the agreement was due to be signed, and had no access to maps of their own in order to confirm what they were being shown. Yasser Arafat was quoted by Uri Savir, the Israeli chief negotiator at Oslo, as follows: "Arafat glared at [the map] in silence, then sprang out of his chair and declared it to be an insufferable humiliation. 'These are cantons! You want me to accept cantons! You want to destroy me'!"

Professor Shari Motro, then an Israeli secretary in the Oslo delegation, described in 2005 part of the story behind the maps:

Some people claim that the Oslo process was deliberately designed to segregate Palestinians into isolated enclaves so that Israel could continue to occupy the West Bank without the burden of policing its people. If so, perhaps the map inadvertently revealed what the Israeli wordsmiths worked so diligently to hide. Or perhaps Israel's negotiators purposefully emphasized the discontinuity of Palestinian areas to appease opposition from the Israeli right, knowing full well that Arafat would fly into a rage. Neither is true. I know, because I had a hand in producing the official Oslo II map, and I had no idea what I was doing. Late one night during the negotiations, my commander took me from the hotel where the talks were taking place to an army base, where he led me to a room with large fluorescent light tables and piles of maps everywhere. He handed me some dried-out markers, unfurled a map I had never seen before, and directed me to trace certain lines and shapes. Just make them clearer, he said. No cartographer was present, no graphic designer weighed in on my choices, and, when I was through, no Gilad Sher reviewed my work. No one knew it mattered.

Motro's then superior officer, Shaul Arieli, who drew and was ultimately responsible for the Oslo maps, explained that the Palestinian enclaves were created by a process of subtraction, consigning the Palestinians to those areas that the Israelis considered "unimportant":

The process was very easy. In the agreement signed in '93, all those areas that would be part of final status agreement—settlements, Jerusalem, etc.—were known. So I took out those areas, along with those roads and infrastructure that were important to Israel in the interim period. It was a new experience for me. I did not have experience of mapmaking before. I of course used many different civilian and military organizations to gather data on the infrastructure, roads, water pipes, etc. I took out what I thought important for Israel.

The islands isolate Palestinian communities from one another, while allowing them to be well guarded and easily contained by the Israeli military. The arrangements result in "inward growth" of Palestinian localities, rather than urban sprawl. Many observers, including Edward Said, Norman Finkelstein and Meron Benvenisti were highly critical of the arrangements, with Benvenisti concluding that the Palestinian self-rule sketched out in the agreements was little more than a euphemism for Bantustanization. Defenders of the agreements made in the 1990s between Israel and the PLO rebuffed criticisms that the effect produced was similar to that of South Africa's apartheid regime, by noting that, whereas the Bantustan structure was never endorsed internationally, the Oslo peace process's memorandum had been underwritten and supported by an international concert of nations, both in Europe, the Middle East and by the Russian Federation.

==== Netanyahu and the Wye River Accord ====
A subsequent Wye River Accord negotiated with Benjamin Netanyahu drew similar criticism. Israeli author Amos Elon wrote in 1996 that the idea of Palestinian independence is "anathema" to Netanyahu, and that "[t]he most he seems ready to grant the Palestinians is a form of very limited local autonomy in some two or three dozen Bantustan-style enclaves". (Note: Rabin and Peres were reconciled to the idea that the Palestinians would eventually establish their own independent state even as the Israelis had established theirs. This cannot be said of the new administration headed by Benyamin Netanyahu. On the contrary, the idea of Palestinian independence is clearly anathema to him. Netanyahu keeps saying that he will honor all international agreements made by the previous government. He also makes it plain that he considers the Oslo agreement a grievous, if not criminal, mistake. The most he seems ready to grant the Palestinians is a form of very limited local autonomy in some two or three dozen Bantustan-style enclaves, on less than 10 percent of occupied territory, surrounded by ever-growing Israeli settlements established on expropriated Palestinian land (Elon 1996).) Noam Chomsky argued that the situation envisaged still differed from the historical South African model in that Israel did not subsidize the fragmented territories it controlled, as South Africa did, leaving that to international aid donors; and secondly, despite exhortations from the business community, it had, at that period, failed to set up maquiladoras or industrial parks to exploit cheap Palestinian labor, as had South Africa with the bantustans. He did draw an analogy however between the two situations by saying that the peace negotiations had led to a corrupt elite, the Palestinian Authority, playing a role similar to that of the black leadership appointed by South Africa to administer their Bantustans. Chomsky concluded that it was in Israel's interest to agree to call these areas states. (Note: "When I was in Israel recently, giving talks on the thirtieth anniversary of the occupation, I quoted a passage about the Bantustans from a standard academic history of South Africa. You didn't have to comment. Everybody who had their eyes open could recognize it. There were many people who just refuse to see what's happening, including most of the doves. But if you pay attention to what's happening, that's the description. So it is absurd for Israel to be to the racist side of South Africa under Apartheid. I assume that sooner or later they will agree to call these things states." (Chomsky & Barsamian 2001, p. 90))

=== Subsequent peace plans ===
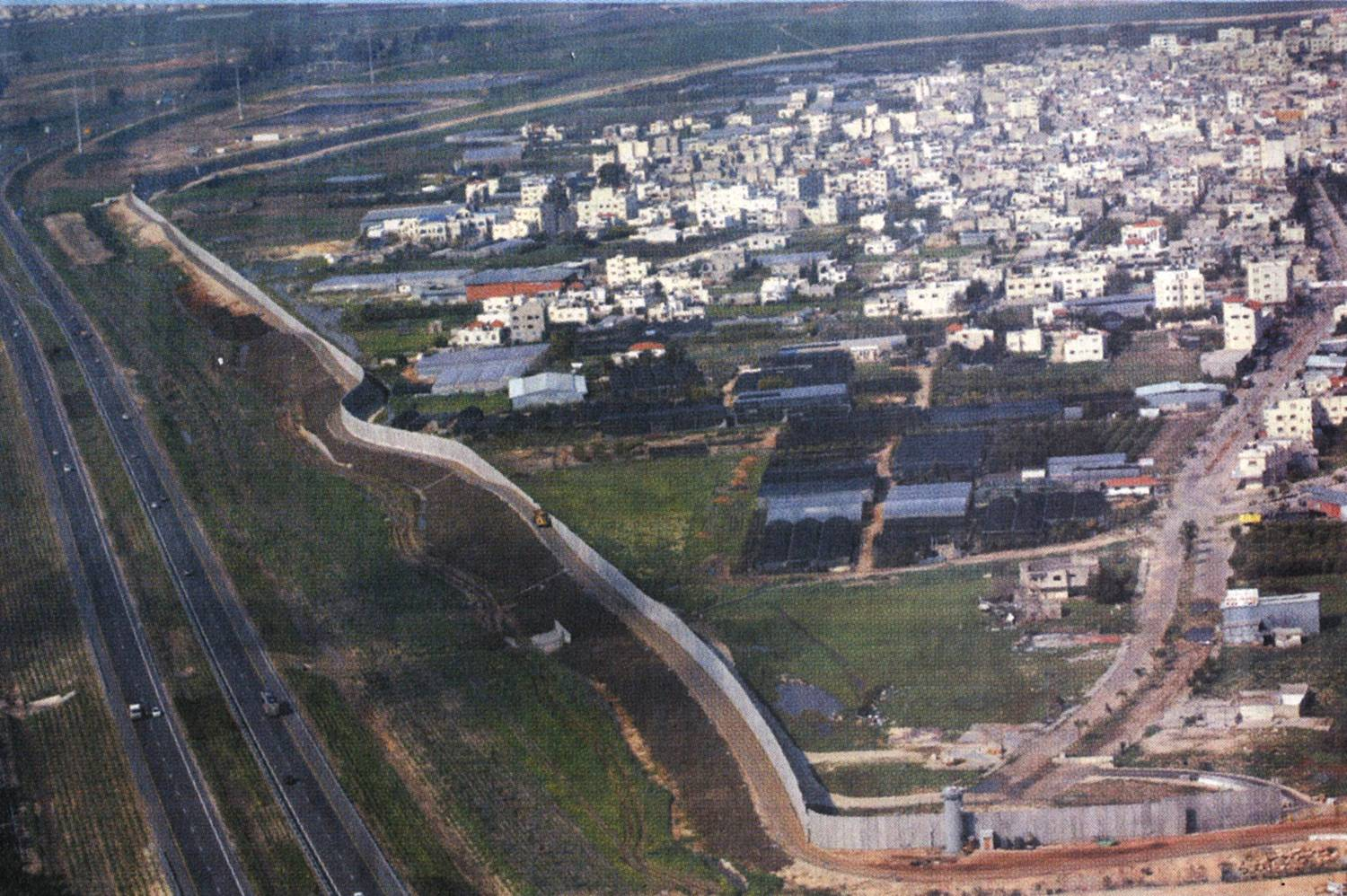
Aerial view of Qalqilya

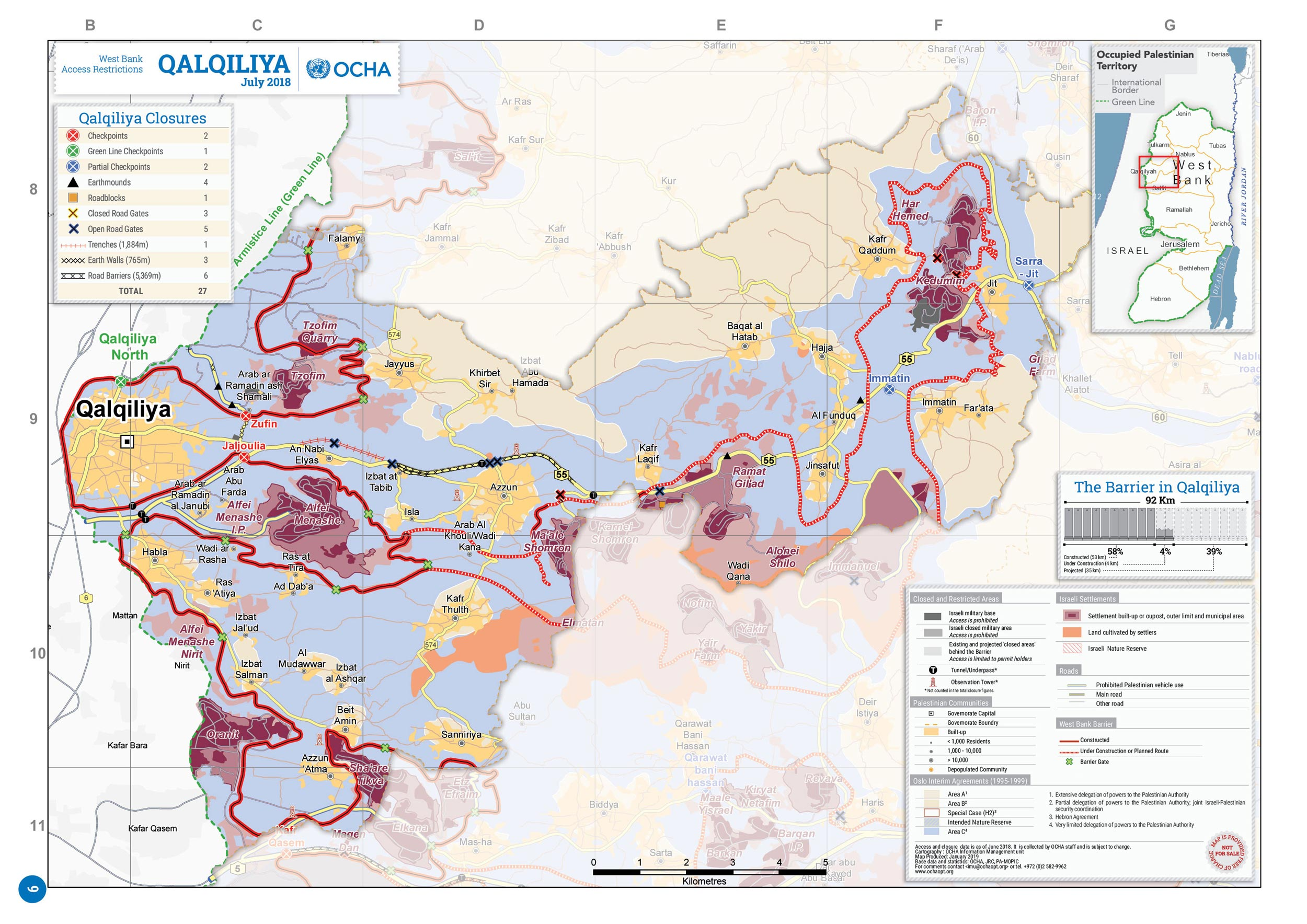
2018 United Nations showing the Qalqilya area

Images showing the Palestinian city of Qalqilya, surrounded on three sides by the Israeli West Bank barrier and on the east by Area C (Note: "Walaja, a village southeast of Jerusalem on the Green Line, was another example of near complete enclavization similar to Qalqiliya. The wall blocked the sun and there was one checkpoint and gate to enter and exit.." (Peteet 2017, p. 52))

==== 2000 Camp David Summit ====
Talks to achieve a comprehensive resolution of the conflict were renewed at the Camp David Summit in 2000, only for them to break down. Accounts differ as to which side bore responsibility for the failure. Reports of the outcome of the summit have been described as illustrating the Rashomon effect, in which the multiple witnesses gave contradictory and self-serving interpretations. (Note: KACOWICZ, A. (2005). Rashomon in the Middle East: Clashing Narratives, Images, and Frames in the Israeli–Palestinian Conflict. Cooperation and Conflict, 40(3), 343-360. Retrieved 16 February 2021, from http://www.jstor.org/stable/45084335) (Note: ARONOFF, M.J. (2009), Camp David Rashomon: Contested Interpretations of the Israel/Palestine Peace Process. Political Science Quarterly, 124: 143-167. https://doi.org/10.1002/j.1538-165X.2009.tb00645.x) (Note: Shamir, S. (2005). The Enigma of Camp David. The Camp David Summit-What Went Wrong: "...manifestation of the Rashomon syndrome...")

Israel Prime Minister Ehud Barak's offer was widely reported as "generous" and, according to participant Dennis Ross would have handed control over 97% of the West Bank to Palestinians. Responding to Ross' comments, Hassan Abdel Rahman, the Palestinian representative in Washington since 1994, at a forum sponsored by the U.S. Institute for Peace, disputed this version of events.

Ehud Barak said that revisionist critics' charges that his plan offered "noncontiguous bantustans" was "one of the most embarrassing lies to have emerged from Camp David." Others were of the opinion that despite an undertaking to withdraw from most of their territory, the resulting entity would still have consisted of several bantustans. Israeli journalist Ze'ev Schiff argued that "the prospect of being able to establish a viable state was fading right before [the Palestinians] eyes. They were confronted with an intolerable set of options: to agree to the spreading occupation... or to set up wretched Bantustans, or to launch an uprising."

Former U.S. President Jimmy Carter wrote about The Clinton Parameters in his widely publicized 2006 book Palestine: Peace Not Apartheid:

The best offer to the Palestinians – by Clinton, not Barak – had been to withdraw 20 percent of the settlements, covering about 10 percent of the occupied land, including land to be 'leased' and portions of the Jordan River valley and East Jerusalem. The percentage figure is misleading, since it usually includes only the actual footprints of the settlements. There is a zone with a radius of about four hundred meters around each settlement within which Palestinians cannot enter. In addition, there are other large areas that would have been taken or earmarked to be used exclusively by Israel, roadways that connect the settlements to one another and to Jerusalem, and 'life arteries' that provide the settlers with water, sewage, electricity, and communications. These range in width from five hundred to four thousand meters, and Palestinians cannot use or cross many of these connecting links. This honeycomb of settlements and their interconnection conduits effectively divide the West Bank into at least two noncontiguous areas and multiple fragments, often uninhabitable or even unreachable, and control of the Jordan River valley denies Palestinians any direct access eastward into Jordan. About one hundred military checkpoints completely surround Palestine and block routes going into or between Palestinian communities, combined with an uncountable number of other roads that are permanently closed with large concrete cubes or mounds of earth and rocks. There was no possibility that any Palestinian leader could accept such terms and survive, but official statements from Washington and Jerusalem were successful in placing the entire onus for the failure on Yasir Arafat.

Following the breakdown of talks, Palestinian protests escalated into the Second Intifada.

==== Sharon, Olmert and Bush ====
On his election to the Israeli Prime Minister in March 2001, Ariel Sharon expressed his determination not to allow the road map for peace advanced by the first administration of George W. Bush to hinder his territorial goals, and stated that Israeli concessions at all prior negotiations were no longer valid. Several prominent Israeli analysts concluded that his plans torpedoed the diplomatic process, with some claiming that his vision of Palestinian enclaves resembled the Bantustan model. (Note: (1) Jeff Halper arguing that the occupation will be permanent, as opposed to proponents of a Two state solution, wrote in September 2003: 'the danger in being for a Palestinian state is that if you don't understand the control mechanisms, then you are actually agitating for a Bantustan. I mean, Sharon also wants a Palestinian state: he wants a state that is completely controlled by Israel. So, if you only look at territory and you don't look at the issue of control you end up advocating a Bantustan.' (Halper 2004, p. 105); (2) 'In April he said that Israel would not withdraw from most of the West Bank, would continue to occupy the Jordan River Valley and the roads leading to them, would make no concessions on Jerusalem, would "absolutely not" evacuate a single settlement "at any price" and would not cede control of the West Bank water aquifers. In case that was not sufficiently clear, over the next year he repeatedly said that the Israeli concessions at Oslo, Camp David, and Taba were no longer valid. A number of prominent Israeli analysts commented that Sharon's intentions were to torpedo the diplomatic process, continue the Israeli occupation, and limit the Palestinians to a series of enclaves surrounded by the Israeli settlements; some even wrote that Sharon's long term strategy resembled that of the "Bantustans" created by the South African apartheid regime' (Slater 2020, p. 303).) In 2002, Israel began Operation Defensive Shield and commenced the Israeli West Bank barrier, which frequently deviates from the pre-1967 ceasefire line into the West Bank.

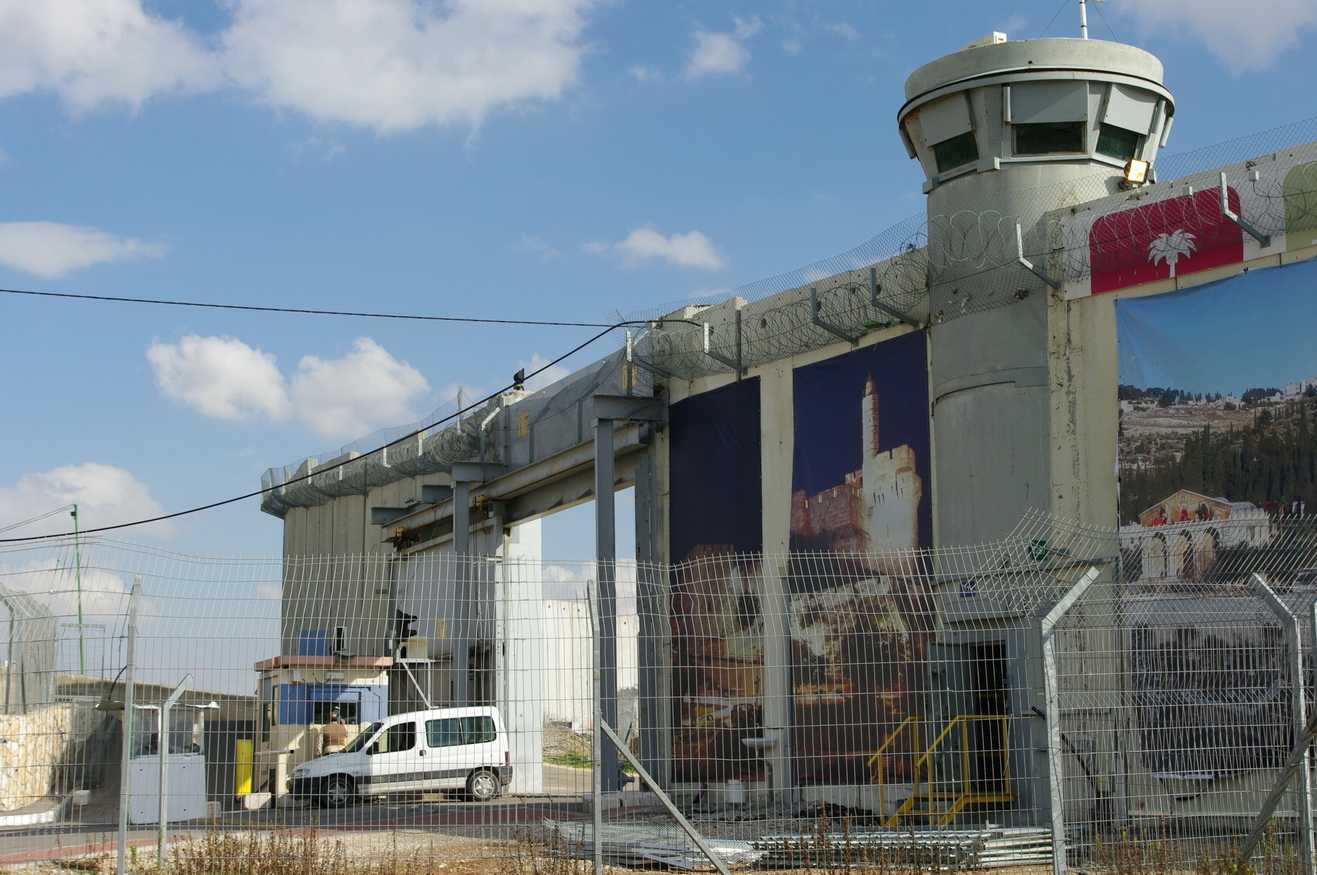
Entrance gate to the Israeli separation wall surrounding Bethlehem, in the occupied West Bank, February 2009

It later emerged that in private, Sharon had confided to a foreign statesman as early as April 1999, when he was serving as Foreign Minister for the Netanyahu government, (Note: "Maurizio Molinari, che era il corrispondente diplomatico de 'La Stampa' quando D'Alema era Presidente del Consiglio, descrive in un suo libro un incontro tra D'Alema ed Ariel Sharon... Mi ha detto una cosa che ricordo ancora. In quel periodo egli sosteneva che non ci sarà un vero e proprio Stato palestinese, bensì dei territori palestinesi, senza forze di sicurezza ed inclusi nei confini di Israele". Il termine usato da Sharon aveva alquanto spaventato D'Alema. "Egli ha chiarito, e ha usato il termine banthustan, le enclavi dei neri fondate dal governo dell'apartheid in Sud Africa. Io gli ho risposto: non troverà mai una controparte palestinese che firmi un accordo di questo genere" (IMFA 2006)) that he believed the apartheid-era Bantustan provided "an ideal solution to the dilemma of Palestinian statehood". When Massimo D'Alema recalled the discussion during which Sharon explained his preference for Bantustan-like Palestine, one of the guests, who attended a private dinner the Italian Prime Minister hosted for Israelis in late April 2003, countered by suggesting that D'Alema's recollections must be an interpretation rather than a fact. d'Alema replied that the words he gave were "a precise quotation of your prime minister." Another Israeli guest, who was present at the dinner and who was (deeply) involved in cultivating ties between Israel and South Africa, confirmed that "whenever he happened to encounter Sharon, he would be interrogated at length about the history of the protectorates and their structures." In the same year Sharon himself was forthcoming in avowing that it informed his plan to construct a "map of a (future) Palestinian state". (Note: "In 2003, Prime Minister Ariel Sharon revealed that he relied on South Africa's Bantustan model in constructing a possible 'map of a Palestinian state'." (Feld 2014, pp. 99, 138)) Not only was the Gaza Strip to be reduced to a bantustan, but the model there, according to Meron Benvenisti, was to be transposed to the West Bank by ensuring, simultaneously, that the Separation Wall itself broke up into three fragmented entities: Jenin-Nablus, Bethlehem-Hebron and Ramallah. (Note: "with breathtaking daring, Sharon submits a plan that appears to promise the existence of a 'Jewish democratic state' via 'separation', 'the end of the conquest', the 'dismantling of settlements' – and also the imprisonment of some 3 million Palestinians in bantustans. This is an 'interim plan' that is meant to last forever. The plan will last, however, only as long as the illusion is sustained that 'separation' is a means to end the conflict." (Benvenisti 2004))

Avi Primor in 2002 described the implications of the plan thus: "Without anyone taking notice, a process is underway establishing a 'Palestinian state' limited to the Palestinian cities, a 'state' comprisedof a number of separate, sovereign-less enclaves, with no resources for self-sustenance." In 2003, the historian Tony Judt, arguing that the peace process had effectively been killed, leaving "Palestinian Arabs corralled into shrinking Bantustans." (Note: Judt, just before his death. stated in an interview that, since his 2003 article, "everyone from Moshe Arens to Barak to Olmert has admitted that Israel is on the way to a single state with a potential Arab majority in Bantustans unless something happens fast" (Judt & Michaeli 2011; Judt 2003)) Commenting on these plans in 2006, Elisha Efrat, Professor of urban geography at TAU argued that any state created on these fragmented divisions would be neither economically viable nor amenable to administration. (Note: "It is quite clear that a Palestinian State with so many territorial enclaves will not be able to manage economic functions and administration. Even if its sovereign territory were greater, and even if some of the enclaves were connected into a continued territorial unity, the main communications arteries that are under Israeli dominance running from north to south and from west to east, and those along the Judean Desert that are under Israeli dominance, might perpetuate their spatial fragmentation." (Efrat 2006, p. 199)) In a 26 May 2005 joint press conference with Mahmoud Abbas, in the White House Rose Garden, President George W. Bush stated his expectations vis-a-vis the Roadmap Plan as follows:

Any final status agreement must be reached between the two parties, and changes to the 1949 Armistice lines must be mutually agreed to. A viable two-state solution must ensure contiguity of the West Bank, and a state of scattered territories will not work. There must also be meaningful linkages between the West Bank and Gaza. This is the position of the United States today, it will be the position of the United States at the time of final status negotiations.

Sharon eventually disengaged from the Gaza in 2005, and in the ensuing years, during the Sharon-Peres interregnum and the government of Ehud Olmert it became a commonplace to speak of the result there, where Hamas assumed sole authority over the internal administration of the Strip, as the state of Hamastan, a wordplay on Bantustan (Note: "If Ariel Sharon were able to hear the news from the Gaza Strip and West Bank, he would call his loyal aide, Dov Weissglas, and say with a big laugh: 'We did it, Dubi.' Sharon is in a coma, but his plan is alive and kicking. Everyone is now talking about the state of Hamastan. In his house, they called it a bantustan, after the South African protectorates designed to perpetuate apartheid." (Eldar 2007)) (Note: "Israeli politicians lost no time exploiting these fears increasingly employing the term Hamastan - a neologism for the concept of a Hamas-dominated Palestinian Islamist theocracy under Iranian tutelage - to describe these circumstances; 'before our very eyes', as Netanyahu warned, 'Hamastan has been established, the step-child of Iran and the Taliban'." (Ram 2009, p. 82)) and other pejorative uses of the suffix -stan to describe a place populated by Muslims. At the same time, according to Akiva Eldar, the Sharon plan to apply the same policy of creating discontinuous enclaves for Palestinians in the West Bank was implemented. In his Sadat lecture of 14 April 2005, former United States Secretary of State James Baker said that "Finally, the administration must make it unambiguously clear to Israel that while Prime Minister Sharon's planned withdrawal from Gaza is a positive initiative, it cannot be simply the first step in a unilateral process leading to the creation of Palestinian Bantustans in the West Bank". The maps for Sharon's disengagement from Gaza, Camp David and Oslo are similar to each other and to the 1967 Allon plan. By 2005, together with the Separation Wall, that area had been potted with 605 closure barriers whose overall effect was to create a "matrix of contained quadrants controllable from well-defended, fixed military positions and settlements". (Note: "To make this grid possible, more than 2,710 homes and workplaces in the West Bank have been completely destroyed, and an additional 39,964 others have been damaged, since the beginning of the Intifada." (Haddad 2009, p. 280)) (Note: "At times, the politics of separation/partition has been dressed up as a formula for peaceful settlement at others as a bureaucratic-territorial arrangement of governance, and most recently as a means of unilaterally imposed domination, oppression and fragmentation of the Palestinian people and their land. The Oslo Accords of the 1990s left the Israeli military in control of the interstices of an archipelago of about two hundred separate zones of Palestinian restricted autonomy in the West Bank and Gaza." (Weizman 2012, pp. 10–11)) Olmert's Realignment plan (or convergence plan) are terms used to describe a method whereby Israel creates "facts on the ground" for a future Palestinian state of its own design as foreseen by the Allon plan.

==== Netanyahu and Obama ====
The "Palestinian Archipelago" in a United States Department of State presentation on Israel and Palestine, prepared in 2015 and updated in 2016

In 2016, the last year of his presidency, Barack Obama and John Kerry discussed a number of detailed maps showing the fragmentation of the Palestinian areas. Advisor Ben Rhodes said that Obama "was shocked to see how 'systematic' the Israelis had been at cutting off Palestinian population centers from one another." These findings were discussed with the Israeli government, which never disputed them. Obama's realization was reported to be the reason that he abstained on the United Nations Security Council Resolution 2334 which condemned the settlements.

According to Haaretz's Chemi Shalev, in a speech marking the 50th anniversary of the Six-Day War, "Netanyahu thus envisages not only that Palestinians in the West Bank will need Israeli permission to enter and exit their 'homeland', which was also the case for the Bantustans, but that the Israel Defense Forces (IDF) will be allowed to continue setting up roadblocks, arresting suspects and invading Palestinian homes, all in the name of 'security needs'."

In a 2016 interview, former Israeli Member of Knesset (MK) Ksenia Svetlova argued that West Bank disengagement would be very difficult and that a more likely outcome was "annexation and controlling Palestinians in Bantustans".

==== Trump peace plan ====
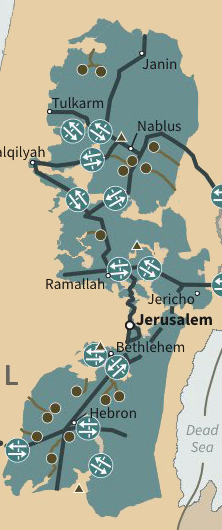
Proposal in the Trump peace plan (including a tunnel to Gaza and parts of the Negev Desert)

The 2020 Trump peace plan proposed splitting a possible "State of Palestine" into five zones:

- A reduced Gaza Strip connected by a road to two uninhabited districts in the Negev desert;
- Part of the southern West Bank;
- A central area around Ramallah, almost trisected by a number of Israeli settlements;
- A northern area including Nablus, Jenin, and Tulkarm;
- A small zone including Qalqilya, surrounded by Israeli settlements.

Mahmoud Abbas at the United Nations Security Council in February 2020, describing the Trump plan as "Swiss Cheese".

Palestinian President Mahmoud Abbas commented on the fragmented nature of the proposal at the United Nations Security Council, waving a picture of the fragmented cantons and stating: "This is the state that they will give us. It's like a Swiss cheese, really. Who among you will accept a similar state and similar conditions?" According to Professor Ian Lustick, the appellation "State of Palestine" applied to this archipelago of Palestinian-inhabited districts is not to be taken any more seriously than the international community took apartheid South Africa's description of the bantustans of Transkei, Bophuthatswana, Venda, and Ciskei as "independent nation-states."

When the plan emerged, Yehuda Shaul argued that the proposals were remarkably similar to the details set forth both in the 1979 Drobles Plan, written for the World Zionist Organization and entitled Master Plan for the Development of Settlements in Judea and Samaria, 1979–1983, and key elements of the earlier Allon Plan, aimed at ensuring Jewish settlement in the Palestinian territories, while blocking the possibility that a Palestinian state could ever emerge. (Note: The International Fact-Finding Mission on Israeli Settlements noted that "Various sources refer to settlement master plans, including the Allon Plan(1967), the Drobles Plan(1978)–later expanded as the Sharon Plan(1981)– and the Hundred Thousand Plan(1983). Although these plans were never officially approved, they have largely been acted upon by successive Governments of Israel. The mission notes a pattern whereby plans developed for the settlements have been mirrored in Government policy instruments and implemented on the ground." (UNHCR 2013, pp. 6–7))

The plan in principle contemplates a future Palestinian state which would be, as the Financial Times describes, "shrivelled to a constellation of disconnected enclaves". A group of human rights experts also sided with the opinion, saying that "what would be left of the West Bank would be a Palestinian Bantustan, islands of disconnected land completely surrounded by Israel and with no territorial connection to the outside world." Similar opinions were expressed by Daniel Levy, former Israeli negotiator and president of the U.S. Middle East Project (USMEP), (Note: "The visuals of the map proposed are a dead giveaway: a patchwork of Palestinian islands best viewed alongside the map of South Africa's apartheid-era Bantustans." (Levy 2020)) and the UN Special Rapporteur Michael Lynk. (Note: "This is not a recipe for a just and durable peace but rather endorses the creation of a 21st century Bantustan in the Middle East. The Palestinian statelet envisioned by the American plan would be scattered archipelagos of non-contiguous territory completely surrounded by Israel, with no external borders, no control over its airspace, no right to a military to defend its security, no geographic basis for a viable economy, no freedom of movement and with no ability to complain to international judicial forums against Israel or the United States." (Lynk 2020))

==== Netanyahu annexation plan ====
September 2019 proposal by Israeli prime minister Benjamin Netanyahu for annexation of the Jordan Valley showing Jericho becoming a Palestinian enclave.

Israeli Prime Minister Benjamin Netanyahu announced on 6 April 2019, three days before the Israeli elections, that he would not give up any settlement and would extend gradually Israeli sovereignty to the West Bank. Al Jazeera reported the following year that Netanyahu was expected on 1 July 2020 to announce Israel's annexation of the Jordan Valley and northern Dead Sea. Citing calculations by Peace Now, this most recent proposal would seize around 1,236 square kilometres (477 sq mi) of land from the Jordan Valley compared to the 964 square kilometres (372 sq mi) of Trump's conceptual map. In a May 2020 interview with Israel Hayom, ahead of the proposed annexation, Netanyahu explained that Palestinian enclaves in the area would remain subordinated to Israeli military control: "They will remain a Palestinian enclave (Hebrew: כמובלעות פלשתיניות)... You don't need to apply sovereignty over them, they will remain Palestinian subjects if you will. But security control also applies to these places." In the event, the annexation proposal was not implemented.

According to Yuval Shany, Hersch Lauterpacht Chair in International Law at the Hebrew University of Jerusalem, Netanyahu's annexation plans violated the Oslo Accords, and the two-state solution Netanyahu had formerly accepted. The effective result of such plans would be to "effectively create(s) Palestinian enclaves in the nonannexed area with limited contiguity and almost certainly no sustainable viability as an independent state. This division of territorial control looks more like the South African system of Bantustans than the foundation of a viable two-state solution." 50 UN experts went public stating that the result would be Bantustans, with Jewish South African-Israeli writer Benjamin Pogrund, formerly opposed to the Apartheid analogy also claiming that the proposal would effectively introduce an apartheid system. A similar opinion was expressed by the Israel Democracy Institute's Professor Amichai Cohen. (Note: "Israel's annexation of swathes of the West Bank will lead to the territory left for the Palestinian Authority becoming the new Bantustans – small puppet enclaves whose sole existence is to legitimize Israeli control, absolving Israel of having to deal with the question of Palestinian status and ensuring the protection of Jewish majority in the region." (Cohen 2020))

== Land area ==
=== Settlements and Area C ===
The Allon Plan, the Drobles World Zionist Organization plan, Menachem Begin's plan, Benjamin Netanyahu's "Allon Plus" plan, (Note: In June 1997, the media reported the outlines of a proposal put forward by Prime Minister Netanyahu as a basis for a permanent settlement between Israel and the Palestinians. The proposal, presented during a Security Cabinet meeting, was referred to as the "Allon Plus" Plan. Reportedly, under the proposal Israel would retain control of the Israeli settlement clusters that would include the "Greater Jerusalem" area, the "Gush Etzion" and "Ma'aleh Adumim" settlement blocs, other large concentrations of settlements in the West Bank, the entire Jordan Valley, a "security area" east of the Green Line, and a network of bypass roads. The Palestinians would be left with less than half of the Occupied Palestinian Territory, broken up into several unconnected enclaves (QoP 2014).) the 2000 Camp David Summit, and Sharon's vision of a Palestinian state all foresaw a territory surrounded, divided, and, ultimately, controlled by Israel, as did the more recent Trump peace plan. The settlements have turned Palestinian communities into fragmented enclaves without development prospects. (Note: They [Israel] have destroyed the livelihoods of thousands of farmers who have lost their lands and their ability to keep making a living off it. The location of settlements is the main determinant of where checkpoints are installed, what lands Palestinian owners can access and what roads they may use. It was also the main factor in determining the route of the Separation Barrier (Hareuveni & Etkes 2021, p. 5).) Settlement activity increased markedly in the Oslo years. From 1994 to 2000, the West Bank's settler population grew by 80,700 and about four hundred kilometers of roads were laid. From late 1992 until 2001, "between 71 and 102 new Jewish outposts were established." Neve Gordon argues that this activity stands in contradiction to the idea of withdrawal of Israeli sovereignty and the creation of a Palestinian state.

Settler population	1948	1972	1983	1993	2004	2014	2020
West Bank (excluding Jerusalem)	480 (see Gush Etzion)	1,182	22,800	111,600	234,500	400,000	451,700
Gaza Strip ^{2}	30 (see Kfar Darom)	700 ^{1}	900	4,800	7,826	0	0
East Jerusalem	2,300 (see Jewish Quarter, Atarot, Neve Yaakov)	8,649	76,095	152,800	181,587		220,000
Total	2,810	10,531	99,795	269,200	423,913		671,700
Golan Heights	0	77	6,800	12,600	17,265		

^{1} including Sinai
^{2} Janet Abu-Lughod mentions 500 settlers in Gaza in 1978 (excluding Sinai), and 1,000 in 1980.

A new Israeli government, formed on 13 June 2021, declared a "status quo" in the settlements policy. According to Peace Now, as of 28 October this has not been the case. On 24 October 2021, tenders were published for 1,355 housing units plus another 83 in Givat HaMatos and on 27 October 2021, approval was given for 3,000 housing units including in settlements deep inside the West Bank. These developments were condemned by the U.S. As well as by the United Kingdom, Russia and 12 European countries. While UN experts, Michael Lynk, Special Rapporteur on the situation of human rights in the Palestinian Territory occupied since 1967 and Mr. Balakrishnan Rajagopal (United States of America), UN Special Rapporteur on adequate housing said that settlement expansion should be treated as a "presumptive war crime".

United Nations Security Council Resolution 2334 of 2016 "Requests the Secretary-General to report to the Council every three months on the implementation of the provisions of the present resolution;" On 23 December 2021, Michael Lynk, the UN Special Rapporteur for human rights in the Palestinian territories referred to the 5 year anniversary of Resolution 2334 and said "Without decisive international intervention to impose accountability upon an unaccountable occupation, there is no hope that the Palestinian right to self-determination and an end to the conflict will be realised anytime in the foreseeable future,".

=== Contiguity ===
West Bank Access Restrictions

Successive settlement plans intended to disrupt geographical contiguity with a view to preventing the emergence of a Palestinian state. The Drobles plan made this explicit:

The purpose of settling the areas between and around the centers occupied by the minorities is to reduce to the minimum the danger of an additional Arab state being established in these territories. Being cut off by Jewish settlements the minority population will find it difficult to form a territorial and political community.

Post-Oslo closure and separation (hafrada) policies are manifested in checkpoints, bypass roads, The Wall, and the permit system. These have resulted in the confinement, immiseration, and immobilization of the Palestinians, creating a fragmented area, a fractured society, a devastated economy, and a feeling of "isolation and abandonment". This divide and rule arrangement of fragmented Palestinian areas in weak and poor sub-communities has resulted in the erosion of urban areas, impoverishment of rural areas, the separation of families and the denial of medical care and higher education. Meron Benvenisti wrote in 2006 that the Israeli government hopes that this will result in demographic distress and emigration, but that "Palestinian society is demonstrating signs of strong cohesion and adjustment to the cruel living conditions forced on it, and there are no signs that the strategic goals have in fact been achieved."

In 2004, Colin Powell was asked what George W. Bush meant when he spoke of a "contiguous Palestine"; Powell explained that "[Bush] was making the point that you can't have a bunch of little Bantustans or the whole West Bank chopped up into noncoherent, noncontiguous pieces, and say this is an acceptable state." Rather than territorial contiguity, Sharon had in mind transportation contiguity. (Note: "Uri Avnery (2005) noted that President Bush called in Brussels for the establishment of a 'democratic state with territorial continuity' in the West Bank, and then added: 'A state on scattered territories will not work'. Avnery contended that President Bush was pointing a finger at Sharon's enclavisation settlement strategy in the West Bank and that he was apparently beginning to see it as counter-productive. Avnery added that these statements by Bush in Brussels were made to reduce U.S. differences and potential friction with the European Union, which clearly opposes the annexation of West Bank territory by Israel." (Falah 2005)) In 2004 Israel asked international donors to fund a new road network for Palestinians, that would run under and over the existing settler-only network. Since acceptance would have implied official approval of the settlement enterprise, the World Bank refused. While Israelis could traverse the contiguous Area C, settler-only roads divided the West Bank into a series of non-contiguous areas for Palestinians wanting to reach Areas A and B. In 2007, Special Rapporteur John Dugard wrote

The number of checkpoints, including roadblocks, earth mounds and trenches, increased from 376 in August 2005 to 540 in December 2006. These checkpoints divide the West Bank into four distinct areas: the north (Nablus, Jenin and Tulkarem), the centre (Ramallah), the south (Hebron) and East Jerusalem. Within these areas further enclaves have been created by a system of checkpoints and roadblocks. Moreover highways for the use of Israelis only further fragment the Occupied Palestinian Territory into 10 small cantons or Bantustans.

The Encyclopedia of the Israeli–Palestinian Conflict says that "by August 2006 the fragmentation of the West Bank and the ability of Palestinians to move from canton to canton within it were at their nadir." (Note: A combination of Israeli checkpoints, physical obstacles, and a permit system had effectively cut the West Bank into three distinct areas—northern, southern, and central—in addition to East Jerusalem. Within these areas further enclaves have been created, also bordered by checkpoints and roadblocks that increase the isolation of individual Palestinian communities. In addition, the Jordan rift valley had become an almost inaccessible enclave. Fewer and fewer Palestinians were able to obtain permits to visit closed military zones—land to the west of the Barrier. The cantonization of the West Bank, combined with Israel's tight restructions on movement of the Palestinians, is at the heart of the decline of the Palestinian economy (Rubenberg 2010, p. 147).) Criticism of non-contiguity has continued in subsequent years. In 2008, the last year of his presidency, Bush stated that Swiss cheese wasn't going to work as an outline of a state, and that in order to be viable, a future Palestinian state must have contiguous territory. In 2020, former U.S. Ambassador to Israel, Martin Indyk, noted that the Trump Plan proposed 'transportational' contiguity instead of territorial contiguity, via "tunnels that would connect the islands of Palestinian sovereignty. Those tunnels, of course, would be under Israeli control."

=== Land expropriation ===
In 2003, Special Rapporteur on the Right to Food Jean Ziegler reported that he was:

also particularly concerned by the pattern of land confiscation, which many Israeli and Palestinian intellectuals and non-governmental organizations have suggested is inspired by an underlying strategy of "Bantustanization". The building of the security fence/apartheid wall is seen by many as a concrete manifestation of this Bantustanization as, by cutting the Occupied Palestinian Territories into five barely contiguous territorial units deprived of international borders, it threatens the potential of any future viable Palestinian State with a functioning economy to be able to realize the right to food of its own people.

The Financial Times published a 2007 U.N. map and explained: "The UN mapmakers focused on land set aside for Jewish settlements, roads reserved for settler access, the West Bank separation barrier, closed military areas and nature reserves," and "What remains is an area of habitation remarkably close to territory set aside for the Palestinian population in Israeli security proposals dating back to postwar 1967."

In a 2013 report on the Palestinian economy in East Jerusalem, UNCTAD's conclusions noted increased demolitions of Palestinian property and homes as well as settlement growth in the areas surrounding East Jerusalem and Bethlehem adding "to the existing physical fragmentation between different Palestinian 'bantustans' – drawing on South African experience of economically dependent, self-governed "homelands" existing within the orbit of the advanced metropolis,.." A 2015 report of the Norwegian Refugee Council noted the impact of Israeli policies in key areas of East Jerusalem, principally the Wall and settlement activity, particularly in regard to Givat HaMatos and Har Homa. (Note: "In sum, Israel continues to establish facts on the ground in these sensitive areas, thus undermining a future political settlement in East Jerusalem. Its policies reflect an ongoing effort to clear disputed areas in order to establish or expand settlements; change the demographic composition of East Jerusalem and strengthen Jewish presence, impede the development and expansion of Palestinian neighbourhoods, and prevent the prospects of creating a viable Palestinian capital with territorial contiguity." (NRC 2015, p. 26))

According to Haaretz, in November 2020, the Israeli Ministry of Transport announced a highway and transportation master plan through 2045, the first of its kind for the West Bank. Details about the plans are contained in a new report Highway to Annexation which concludes that the "West Bank road and transportation development creates facts on the ground that constitute a significant entrenchment of the de facto annexation already taking place in the West Bank and will enable massive settlement growth in the years to come."

== Jerusalem ==
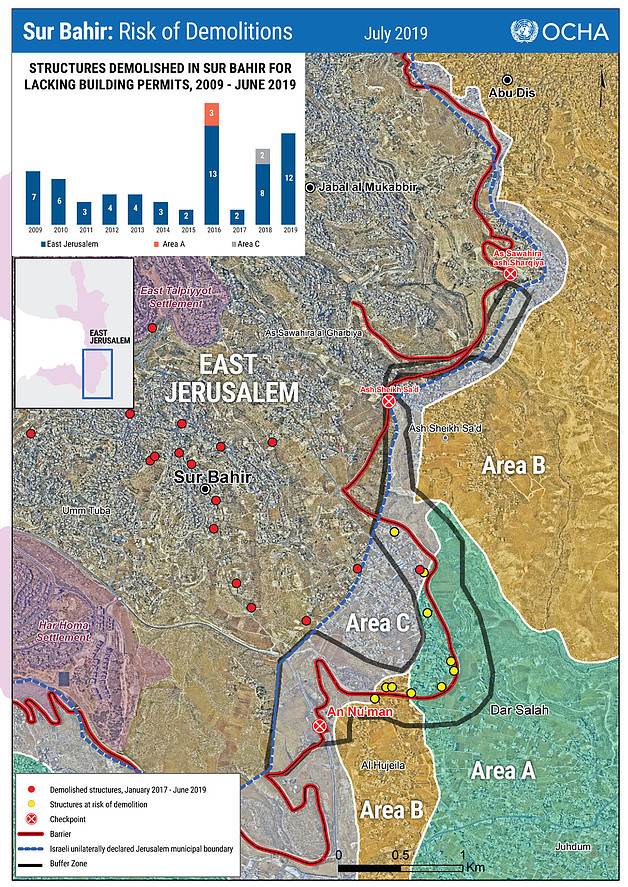
Sur Baher, an example of a Palestinian enclave in East Jerusalem.

Dr. Hanna Baumann of the University of Cambridge's Centre for Urban Conflicts Research describes Jerusalem as "an enclave city par excellence". Baumann explained the similarity in Israeli policies towards Palestinian areas in East Jerusalem and the West Bank, noting that even middle-class Palestinian neighbourhoods in East Jerusalem have been disconnected from the rest of the city. (Note: "Major thoroughfares connecting Israeli settlements cut through the urban fabric of Palestinian neighbourhoods without serving them, dividing them into isolated enclaves and stifling local urban life and social exchange across the east of the city. Like the roads connecting Israeli settlements in the West Bank, these 'conflict infrastructures' turn Palestinian space into an archipelago of disconnected islands. The spatial inequality brought about by the mobility gap is exacerbated by the lack of investment in Palestinian areas of East Jerusalem. Due to decades of neglect, even middle-class Palestinian neighbourhoods lack basic amenities, including functional roads and pavements, connection to the sewage system, reliable garbage removal, community facilities, public parks and postal service. Such policies based on unequal citizenship, effective ethnic segregation and resource allocation on the basis of ethnicity have been termed 'urban ethnocracy'." (Baumann 2016, p. 175)) A similar study published in 2006 by over 40 Palestinian, Israeli and international authors concluded that Jerusalem contains an "archipelago" of isolated Palestinian "islands", created by segregated road systems and buffer zones. (Note: "Every aspect of the city is invested with ethnicity, and a complex system of codes (wrought in architecture, signage, dress, etc.) helps residents to navigate through perceived safe passages and protected environments. This extreme level of segregation has produced a spatial landscape akin to an "archipelago" of isolated "islands"... a complex matrix of exclaves (settlements for Jewish Israelis built in annexed East Jerusalem) and Palestinian enclaves, served by segregated road systems and surrounded by buffer zones." (Misselwitz & Rieniets 2006, pp. 24–25, summary publication p.2)) Through this "spatial containment", Palestinian areas have lost agricultural land, been excluded from Israeli life, and been prohibited from expanding outside of previously established built-up areas. (Note: "As a result of intense settlement construction in East Jerusalem, Palestinian communities are forced within the spatial containment that characterizes the settlements: they have lost their agricultural land reserves and became enclaves within a space of Israeli hegemony — remaining largely excluded them from Israeli political, social, and cultural life... Discrimination is written into the city's master plan, which is based on the declared aim to facilitate a 70% Jewish majority in Jerusalem... Endurance and resilience have been effective tactics for Palestinians. Prohibited from expanding beyond established built-up areas, villages and neighborhoods have become densely knit, congested, and uncontrollable." (Misselwitz & Rieniets 2006, pp. 24–25, summary publication p.2)) This arrangement has been imposed via a series of Israeli government Jerusalem Master Plans since 1967, which have set the urban planning policies for the maintenance of a Jewish majority and cultural hegemony in the city. Other scholars have published similar assessments of the Palestinian enclaves in Jerusalem, including Michael Dumper, Professor of Middle East politics at the University of Exeter (Note: Dumper contends that infrastructural and demographic changes have led to "the enclaving of the eastern part of the city" which has been transformed into "virtually an Israeli Jewish city with small islands of Palestinian residency, commerce, and culture". The settlement infrastructure of "connecting roads, services, and security systems [that] have sliced up East Jerusalem into pieces and surrounded the Palestinians areas". He says that he uses the word enclave to convey "a sense of being encircled, of being detached, and of belonging to something else" while acknowledging there is freedom of movement to adjacent areas (Dumper 2014, pp. 16–17).) and Salem Thawaba and Hussein Al-Rimmawi, Associate Professors at Birzeit University.

== See also ==
- List of cities administered by the Palestinian Authority
- Media coverage of the Arab–Israeli conflict

== Sources ==
- Abu-Lughod, Janet (4 September 1981). "The Fourth United Nations seminar on the Question of Palestine". United Nations. p. 61.
- Abu-Lughod, Janet (Winter 1982). "Israeli Settlements in Occupied Arab Lands: Conquest to Colony". Journal of Palestine Studies. 11 (2): 16–54. doi:10.2307/2536268. JSTOR 2536268. "The Gaza Strip, inhabited by over 400,000 Palestinians and already badly overcrowded, was clearly not the most congenial setting for colonies. Indeed, by 1978, there were only 500 Jewish 'settlers' in Gaza, all in military posts or at the edge of the Rafiah Salient at the Egyptian border. Even after some of the Sinai settlers were regrouped, their number had risen to only 1,000 (circa 1980, as per Israeli newspaaper accounts reproduced in Israel and Palestine Monthly Review, No. 82, Supplement for July 1980:3)."
- Ackerman, Peter; DuVall, Jack (1 December 2015). A Force More Powerful: A Century of Non-violent Conflict. St. Martin's Publishing Group. ISBN 978-1-250-10520-2.
- Adam, Heribert; Moodley, Kogila (2005). Seeking Mandela: Peacemaking Between Israelis and Palestinians. Psychology Press. p. 104. ISBN 978-1-84472-130-6.
- Adem, Seada Hussein (5 April 2019). Palestine and the International Criminal Court. T.M.C. Asser Press. ISBN 978-94-6265-291-0.
- Alissa, Sufyan (2013). "6: The economics of an independent Palestine". In Hilal, Jamil (ed.). Where Now for Palestine?: The Demise of the Two-State Solution. Zed Books. ISBN 978-1-84813-801-8.
- Arafat, Yasser (1978). "The PLO Position". Journal of Palestine Studies. 7 (3): 171–174. doi:10.2307/2536214. JSTOR 2536214.
- Arieli, Shaul (November 2017). Messianism Meets Reality The Israeli Settlement Project in Judea and Samaria: Vision or Illusion, 1967-2016 (PDF) (Report). Economic Cooperation Foundation.
- Aronoff, Myron J. (Spring 2009). "Camp David Rashomon: Contested Interpretations of the Israel/Palestine Peace Process". Political Science Quarterly. 124 (1): 143–167. doi:10.1002/j.1538-165X.2009.tb00645.x. JSTOR 25655613.
- Barak, Oren (November 2005). "The Failure of the Israeli-Palestinian Peace Process, 1993-2000". Journal of Peace Research. 42 (6): 719–736. doi:10.1177/0022343305057889. JSTOR 30042415. S2CID 53652363.
- Baumann, Hanna (2016). "Enclaves, borders, and everyday movements: Palestinian marginal mobility in East Jerusalem". Cities. 59: 173–182. doi:10.1016/j.cities.2015.10.012. ISSN 0264-2751.
- Baylouny, Anne Marie (September 2009). "Fragmented Space and Violence in Palestine". International Journal on World Peace. 26 (3): 39–68. hdl:10945/35591. JSTOR 20752894.
- Becker, Gabriela (2006). "'Final Borders' and 'Security Zones' in Palestine: Israeli Plans for a Bantustan 'State'". Economic and Political Weekly. 41 (13): 1237–1240. JSTOR 4418023.
- Behar, Moshe (2016). "Past and Present Perfect of Israel's One-State Solution". In Ehrenberg, John; Peled, Yoav (eds.). Israel and Palestine Alternative Perspectives on Statehood. Rowman & Littlefield Publishers. pp. 243–270. ISBN 978-1-442-24508-2 – via ResearchGate.
- Benvenisti, Meron (26 April 2004). "Bantustan Plan for an apartheid Israel". The Guardian.
- Benvenisti, Meron (28 December 2006). "The temples of the occupation". Haaretz. Archived from the original on 2 December 2008.
- Bevan, Robert (2007). The Destruction of Memory: Architecture at War. United Kingdom: Reaktion Books. ISBN 978-1-86189-205-8.
- Bishara, Azmi; Usher, Graham (1995). "Bantustanisation or bi-nationalism? An interview with Azmi Bishara". Race & Class. 37 (2). ISBN 978-0-7453-1337-5.
- Blecher, Robert (2005). "Transportational Contiguity". Middle East Report.
  - Also at Google books.
- Bowman, Glenn (2007). "Israel's wall and the logic of encystation: Sovereign exception or wild sovereignty?". Focaal-European Journal of Anthropology. 2007 (50): 127–136. doi:10.3167/foc.2007.500109.
- Boyle, Francis (2011). The Palestinian Right of Return Under International Law. Clarity Press. ISBN 978-0-932-86393-5.
- Brogan, Patrick (16 June 1967). "Problems of Victory Divide Israel". The Times.
- Burns, Jacob; Perugini, Nicola (2016). "Untangling the Oslo Lines". In Manna, Jumana; Storihle, Sille (eds.). The Goodness Regime (PDF). pp. 38–43.
- Carter, Jimmy (2006). Palestine: Peace Not Apartheid. Simon and Schuster. ISBN 978-1-84737-512-4.
- Chaichian, Mohammed (2013). "Bantustans, Maquiladoras, and the Separation Barrier Israeli Style". Empires and Walls: Globalization, Migration, and Colonial Domination. BRILL. pp. 271–319. ISBN 978-9-004-26066-5.
- Chomsky, Noam; Barsamian, David (2001). Propaganda and the Public Mind: Conversations with Noam Chomsky. Pluto Press. ISBN 978-0-745-31788-5.
- Clarno, Andrew James (2009). The Empire's New Walls: Sovereignty, Neo-liberalism, and the Production of Space in Post-apartheid South Africa and Post-Oslo Palestine/Israel (Thesis). pp. 66–67. hdl:2027.42/127105. ISBN 978-1-244-00753-6.
- Clarno, Andy (2017). Neoliberal Apartheid: Palestine/Israel and South Africa After 1994. University of Chicago Press. ISBN 978-0-226-43009-6.
- Cohen, Amichai (2 January 2020). "The West Bank's new Bantustans". Ynetnews.
- Congressional Record: Proceedings and Debates of the 107th Congress, Second Session (PDF). Washington D.C.: United States Government Publishing Office. 20 April 2002. pp. S2995–S2997. "The ideas were presented on December 23 by the President, and they basically said the following: On borders, there would be about a 5 percent annexation in the West Bank for the Israelis and a 2 percent swap. So there would be a net 97 percent of the territory that would go to the Palestinians."
- Cook, Catherine; Hanieh, Adam (2006). "35: Walling in People Walling out Sovereignty". In Beinin, Joel; Stein, Rebecca L. (eds.). The Struggle for Sovereignty: Palestine and Israel, 1993-2005. Stanford University Press. pp. 338–347. ISBN 978-0-8047-5365-4.
- Cook, Jonathan (2013). Disappearing Palestine: Israel's Experiments in Human Despair. Zed Books. ISBN 978-1-848-13649-6.
- Dear, Louise; Mushasha, Sufian (2010). Human Development Report 2009/10 Investing in Human Security for a Future State (PDF) (Report). UNDP.
- Displacement and the 'Jerusalem Question': An Overview of the Negotiations over East Jerusalem and Developments on the Ground (PDF) (Report). Norwegian Refugee Council. April 2015.
- Drew, Catriona (1997). "6: Self Determination, Population Transfer and the Middle East Peace Accords". In Bowen, Stephen (ed.). Human Rights, Self-Determination and Political Change in the Occupied Palestinian Territories. Martinus Nijhoff Publishers. ISBN 90-411-0502-6.
- Dugard, John (29 January 2007). Implementation of General Assembly Resolution 60/251 of 15 March 2006 entitled "Human Rights Council": Report of the Special Rapporteur on the situation of human rights in the Palestinian territories occupied since 1967 (Report). United Nations.
- Dumper, Michael (17 June 2014). Jerusalem Unbound: Geography, History, and the Future of the Holy City. Columbia University Press. ISBN 978-0-231-53735-3.
- Efrat, Elisha (2006). The West Bank and Gaza Strip: A Geography of Occupation and Disengagement. Routledge. ISBN 978-1-134-17217-7.
- Eldar, Akiva (13 May 2003). "Sharon's Bantustans Are Far From Copenhagen's Hope". Haaretz. Archived from the original on 3 February 2019.
- Eldar, Akiva (18 June 2007). "Sharon's Dream". Haaretz. Archived from the original on 27 November 2020.
- Elon, Amos (19 December 1996). "Israel and the End of Zionism". The New York Review of Books.
- Entous, Adam (9 July 2018). "The Maps of Israeli Settlements That Shocked Barack Obama". New Yorker Magazine.
- Epstein, Edward (23 April 2002). "Ex-ambassador calls Arafat obstructionist / Clinton envoy fuels criticism in Congress". SFGATE. "Some in this town say, 'Well, the Palestinians deserve it. They brought it onto themselves, because they were offered a very generous deal in Camp David, and they rejected it.' And this lie has been perpetuated so often in this town to the point where it has become a fact or appears to be a fact"
- Erakat, Noura (2019). Justice for Some: Law and the Question of Palestine. Stanford University Press. p. 14. ISBN 978-0-8047-9825-9.
- Evans, Dominic (14 February 2007). "Israeli wall creates "island" villages in W. Bank". Reuters.
- Falah, Ghazi-Walid (2005). "The Geopolitics of 'Enclavisation' and the Demise of a Two-State Solution to the Israeli-Palestinian Conflict". Third World Quarterly. 26 (8): 1341–1372. doi:10.1080/01436590500255007. JSTOR 4017718. S2CID 154697979.
- Farsakh, Leila (Spring 2005). "Independence, Cantons, or Bantustans: Whither the Palestinian State?". Middle East Journal. 59 (2): 230–245. doi:10.3751/59.2.13. JSTOR 4330126.
- Feld, Marjorie N. (2014). Nations Divided: American Jews and the Struggle over Apartheid. Springer. ISBN 978-1-137-02972-0.
- Finkelstein, Norman G. (2003). Image and Reality of the Israel-Palestine Conflict (2nd ed.). Verso. ISBN 978-1-859-84442-7.
- "Five years after UNSC Resolution 2334, international accountability to end the Israeli occupation is more important than ever". Geneva: OHCHR. 23 December 2021.
- Forced Population Transfer: the Case of Palestine, Segregation, Fragmentation and Isolation (PDF) (Report). BADIL Resource Center for Palestinian Residency and Refugee Rights. February 2020.
- Fragmenting Palestine: Formulas for Partition since the British Mandate (PDF) (Report). PASSIA. May 2013. Archived from the original (PDF) on 19 December 2022.
- Gelvin, James L. (2007). The Israel-Palestine Conflict: One Hundred Years of War. Cambridge University Press. ISBN 978-0-521-88835-6.
- "George Bush pledges for Middle East peace within a year". Evening Standard. 11 January 2008.
- Ghandour-Demiri, Nada (2016). "Israel-Palestine: An Archipelago of (In)security". In Cavelty, Myriam Dunn; Balzacq, Thierry (eds.). Routledge Handbook of Security Studies (2nd ed.). Routledge. ISBN 978-1-317-62091-4.
- Gil, Avi (2020). Shimon Peres: An Insider's Account of the Man and the Struggle for a New Middle East. Bloomsbury Publishing. ISBN 978-0-755-61703-6.
- Goldschmidt, Arthur Jr (2018). A Concise History of the Middle East. Taylor & Francis. ISBN 978-0-429-97515-8.
- Goodman, Hirsh (2011). The Anatomy of Israel's Survival. Hachette UK. ISBN 978-1-610-39083-5.
- Gordon, Dr Neve (2 October 2008). Israel's Occupation. University of California Press. ISBN 978-0-520-94236-3.
- Gorenberg, Gershom (2006). The Accidental Empire: Israel and the Birth of the Settlements, 1967-1977. Henry Holt and Company. ISBN 978-1-466-80054-0.
- "A Government of Change (for the worse)". Peace Now. 28 October 2021.
- Haddad, Mohammed (26 June 2020). "Palestine and Israel: Mapping an annexation". Al Jazeera.
- Haddad, Toufic (2009). "Gaza: Birthing a Bantustan". In Tikva, Honig-Parnass; Haddad, Toufic (eds.). Between the Lines: Israel, the Palestinians, and the U.S. War on Terror. Haymarket Books. pp. 280–290 2. ISBN 978-1-608-46047-2.
- Hajjar, Lisa (2001). "Law against Order: Human Rights Organizations and (versus?) the Palestinian Authority". University of Miami Law Review. 56 (1).
- Halbfinger, David M.; Rasgon, Adam (19 June 2020). "As Annexation Looms, Israeli Experts Warn of Security Risks". The New York Times.
- Halper, Jeff (Winter 2004). "Israel and Empire". Journal of Palestine Studies. 33 (2): 105–106. doi:10.1525/jps.2004.33.2.102. JSTOR 10.1525/jps.2004.33.2.102.
- Hareuveni, Eyal; Etkes, Dror (March 2021). This Is Ours – And This, Too Israel's Settlement Policy in the West Bank (PDF) (Report). B'Tselem & Kerem Navot.
- Harker, Christopher (2020). Spacing Debt: Obligations, Violence, and Endurance in Ramallah, Palestine. Duke University Press. ISBN 978-1-4780-1247-4.
- Harkov, Lahav; Lazaroff, Tovah (28 October 2021). "Russia, UK, top EU nations issue rebuke on settlement plans". The Jerusalem Post.
- Harms, Gregory; Ferry, Todd M. (2017). The Palestine-Israel Conflict: A Basic Introduction 4th Ed. Pluto Press. ISBN 978-0-7453-2378-7.
- Harris, Brice Jr (Summer 1984). "The South Africanization of Israel". Arab Studies Quarterly. 6 (3): 169–189. JSTOR 41857718.
- Hass, Amira (29 November 2004). "Donor Countries Won't Fund Israeli-planned Separate Roads for Palestinians". Haaretz. Archived from the original on 7 May 2018.
- Hass, Amira (15 September 2018). "With Oslo, Israel's Intention Was Never Peace or Palestinian Statehood". Haaretz.
- Holzman-Gazit, Dr Yifat (28 February 2013). Land Expropriation in Israel: Law, Culture and Society. Ashgate Publishing. ISBN 978-1-4094-9592-5.
- Honig-Parnass, Tikva (2011). The False Prophets of Peace: Liberal Zionism and the Struggle for Palestine. Haymarket Books. ISBN 978-1-608-46214-8.
- "Housing minister sees 50% more settlers in West Bank by 2019". Reuters. 16 May 2014.
- Hunter, Jane (Spring 1986). "Israel and the Bantustans". Journal of Palestine Studies. 15 (3): 53–89. doi:10.2307/2536750. JSTOR 2536750.
- Hunter, Jane (1987). Israeli Foreign Policy: South Africa and Central America. South End Press. ISBN 978-0-896-08285-4.
- Indyk, Martin (February 2020). "Trump's Unfair Middle East Plan Leaves Nothing to Negotiate". Foreign Affairs.
- "Intervista". Ministry of Foreign Affairs. 26 May 2006. Archived from the original on 13 January 2021.
- "Israel settlement expansion should be treated as 'presumptive war crime': UN experts". The New Arab. 4 November 2021.
- Israel/Palestine: Exploring A One State Reality (PDF) (Report). The Project on Middle East Political Science. July 2020.
- "Israel: Statement by the Spokesperson on further settlement expansion". Brussels: The Office of the European Union Representative (West Bank and Gaza Strip, UNRWA). 29 October 2021.
- "Israeli annexation of parts of the Palestinian West Bank would break international law – UN experts call on the international community to ensure accountability". UNHRC. 16 June 2020.
- ITAN: Integrated Territorial Analysis of the Neighbourhoods. Scientific Report – Annexes; Applied Research 2013/1/22 Final Report (PDF) (Report). 11 March 2015. p. 889.
- Judt, Tony (23 October 2003). "Israel: The Alternative". The New York Review of Books.
- Judt, Tony; Michaeli, Merav (14 September 2011). "Tony Judt's Final Word on Israel". The Atlantic.
- Kamrava, Mehran (2016). The Impossibility of Palestine: History, Geography, and the Road Ahead. Yale University Press. ISBN 978-0-300-22085-8.
- Kelly, Jennifer Lynn (September 2016). "Asymmetrical Itineraries: Militarism, Tourism, and Solidarity in Occupied Palestine" (PDF). American Quarterly. 68 (3): 723–745. doi:10.1353/aq.2016.0060. S2CID 151482682.
- Kirby, Jen (13 July 2020). "Israel's West Bank annexation plan and why it's stalled, explained by an expert". Vox.
- Klein, M. (2019). Arafat and Abbas: Portraits of Leadership in a State Postponed. Oxford University Press. p. 73. ISBN 978-0-19-008758-6. "Israel would govern these bantustans externally and enter them at will. As far as Netanyahu is concerned, if the Palestinians want to call this kind of autonomy a state, that is their affair."
- Korn, Alina (2013). "6: The Ghettoization of the Palestinians". In Lentin, Ronit (ed.). Thinking Palestine. Zed Books. ISBN 978-1-84813-789-9.
- Kretzmer, David (25 April 2002). The Occupation of Justice: The Supreme Court of Israel and the Occupied Territories. SUNY Press. ISBN 978-0-7914-5337-7.
- Lazaroff, Tovah (5 September 2021). "Growth rate of settlements plummets to all-time low". The Jerusalem Post.
- Le More, Anne (October 2005). "Killing with Kindness: Funding the Demise of a Palestinian State". International Affairs. 81 (5): 981–999. doi:10.1111/j.1468-2346.2005.00498.x. JSTOR 3569071.
- Le More, Anne (31 March 2008). International Assistance to the Palestinians after Oslo: Political guilt, wasted money. Routledge. ISBN 978-1-134-05232-5.
- Levy, Daniel (30 January 2020). "Don't Call It a Peace Plan". The American Prospect.
- Liel, Alon (2020). "Trump's "Deal of the Century" Is Modeled on South African Apartheid". Palestine-Israel Journal of Politics, Economics and Culture. 25 (1&2): 100–120.
- Lissoni, Arianna (2015). "Apartheid's Little Israel: Bophuthatswana". In Jacobs, Sean; Soske, Jon (eds.). Apartheid Israel: The Politics of an Analogy. Haymarket Books. pp. 53–66. ISBN 978-1-608-46519-4.
- Loewenstein, Antony; Moor, Ahmed (25 March 2013). After Zionism: One State for Israel and Palestine. Saqi. p. 14. ISBN 978-0-86356-739-1.
- Lord, Amnon (28 May 2020). "Netanyahu: The Palestinians have to concede, not Israel". Israel Hayom. (also in Hebrew: ראש הממשלה בראיון מיוחד ל"ישראל היום": "לא אנחנו נוותר, אלא הפלשתינים")
- Lustick, Ian (1988). For the Land and the Lord: Jewish Fundamentalism in Israel. Council on Foreign Relations. ISBN 978-0-87609-036-7.
- Lustick, Ian (1997). "Has Israel Annexed East Jerusalem?" (PDF). Middle East Policy. 5 (1): 34–45. doi:10.1111/j.1475-4967.1997.tb00247.x.
- Lustick, Ian (2005). "The One-State Reality: Reading the Trump-Kushner Plan as a Morbid Symptom". The Arab World Geographer. 23 (1): 23.
- Lynk, Michael (31 January 2020). "UN expert alarmed by 'lopsided' Trump plan, says will entrench occupation". UNHCR.
- Machover, Moshé (2012). Israelis and Palestinians: Conflict and Resolution. Haymarket Books. ISBN 978-1-608-46148-6.
- Makdisi, Saree (2005). "Said, Palestine, and the Humanism of Liberation". Critical Inquiry. 31 (2): 443–461. doi:10.1086/430974. JSTOR 430974. S2CID 154951084.
- Makdisi, Saree (2012). Palestine Inside Out: An Everyday Occupation. W. W. Norton & Company. ISBN 978-0-393-06996-9.
- Marzano, Arturo (Spring 2011). "Italian Foreign Policy towards Israel: The Turning Point of the Berlusconi Government (2001––2006)". Israel Studies. 16 (1): 79–103. doi:10.2979/isr.2011.16.1.79. JSTOR 10.2979/isr.2011.16.1.79. S2CID 143454051.
- McColl, R. W.; Newman, D. (1992). "States in Formation: The Ghetto State as Typified in the West Bank and Gaza Strip". GeoJournal. 28 (3): 333–345. Bibcode:1992GeoJo..28..333M. doi:10.1007/BF00817910. JSTOR 41145605. S2CID 153996106.
- McMahon, Sean F. (2010). The Discourse of Palestinian-Israeli Relations: Persistent Analytics and Practices. Routledge. ISBN 978-1-135-20204-0.
- Mendel, Yonatan (June 2013). "New Jerusalem". New Left Review. No. 81.
- Migdalovitz, Carol (16 March 2006). The Middle East Peace Talks: CRS Issue Brief for Congress (PDF) (Report). Congressional Research Service, Library of Congress.
- Misselwitz, P.; Rieniets, T. (2006). City of Collision: Jerusalem and the Principles of Conflict Urbanism. Birkhäuser. ISBN 978-3-7643-7868-4. Overview section also published publicly at ResearchGate
- Moghayer, Taher J.T.; Daget, Yidnekachew Tesmamma; Wang, Xingping (2017). "Challenges of urban planning in Palestine". IOP Conference Series: Earth and Environmental Science. 81 (1): 1–5. Bibcode:2017E&ES...81a2152M. doi:10.1088/1755-1315/81/1/012152.
- Mohammed, Arshad; Holland, Steve (11 February 2020). "Palestinians' Abbas, at U.N., says U.S. offers Palestinians 'Swiss cheese' state". Reuters.
- Molinari, Maurizio (2000). L'interesse nazionale: dieci storie dell'Italia nel mondo. Laterza. ISBN 978-8-842-06063-5.
- Motro, Shari (September–October 2005). "Lessons From the Swiss Cheese Map". Legal Affairs. pp. 46–50. Archived from the original on 14 February 2021. Also available at https://scholarship.richmond.edu/cgi/viewcontent.cgi?article=1350&context=law-faculty-publications
- Nassar, Prof Jamal R. (15 March 1982). "The Fourth United Nations seminar on the Question of Palestine". United Nations. p. 134.
- Niksic, Orhan; Eddin, Nur Nasser; Cali, Massimiliano (10 July 2014). Area C and the Future of the Palestinian Economy. World Bank Publications. ISBN 978-1-464-80196-9.
- "The Origins and Evolution of the Palestine Problem, Part V: 1989-2000". United Nations. 21 April 2014.
- The Palestinian economy in East Jerusalem: Enduring annexation, isolation and disintegration (PDF) (Report). UNCTAD. 2013.
- "Palestinian territories - Timeline". BBC. 8 April 2019.
- Parizot, Cédric (2009). "Temporalities and Perceptions of the Separation between Israelis and Palestinians". Bulletin du Centre de recherche français à Jérusalem (in French). 20 – via OpenEdition Journals.
- Parsons, Nigel (2005). The Politics of the Palestinian Authority: From Oslo to Al-Aqsa. Routledge. ISBN 978-1-135-94523-7.
- Pedahzur, Ami (2005). Suicide Terrorism. Polity Press. ISBN 978-0-745-63383-1.
- Pedatzur, Reuven (1995). "Coming Back Full Circle: The Palestinian Option in 1967". Middle East Journal. 49 (2): 269–291. JSTOR 4328804.
- Peteet, Julie (Winter 2016). "The Work of Comparison: Israel/Palestine and Apartheid". Anthropological Quarterly. 89 (1): 247–281. doi:10.1353/anq.2016.0015. JSTOR 43955521. S2CID 147128703.
- Peteet, Julie (2017). Space and Mobility in Palestine. Indiana University Press. ISBN 978-0-253-02511-1.
- Polakow-Suransky, Sasha (2010). The Unspoken Alliance: Israel's Secret Relationship with Apartheid South Africa. Knopf Doubleday Publishing Group. ISBN 978-0-307-37925-2.
- "Powell Warns Against Division of West Bank Into 'Bantustans'". Haaretz. 6 June 2004. Archived from the original on 6 March 2021.
- Primor, Avi (18 September 2002). "Sharon's South African strategy". Haaretz. Archived from the original on 27 November 2020.
- Primor, Avi (2003). Terror als Vorwand: Die Sprache der Gewalt. Düsseldorf: Droste. ISBN 978-3-770-01183-4.
- Rahnema, Saeed (6 October 2014). "Gaza and the West Bank: Israel's two approaches and Palestinians' two bleak choices". Open Canada, Canadian International Council.
- Ram, Haggai (2009). Iranophobia: The Logic of an Israeli Obsession. Stanford University Press. ISBN 978-0-804-77119-1.
- Raz, Avi (2020). "Dodging the Peril of Peace: Israel and the Arabs in the Aftermath of the 1967 War". In Hanssen, Jens; Ghazal, Amal N. (eds.). The Oxford Handbook of Contemporary Middle-Eastern and North African History. Oxford University Press. pp. 269–291. ISBN 978-0-199-67253-0.
- Reinhart, Tanya (2006). The Road Map to Nowhere: Israel/Palestine Since 2003. Verso Books. ISBN 978-1-844-67076-5.
- Report of the independent international fact-finding mission to investigate the implications of the Israeli settlements on the civil, political, economic, social and cultural rights of the Palestinian people throughout the Occupied Palestinian Territory, including East Jerusalem (PDF) (Report). UNHCR. 7 February 2013. pp. 6–7.
- "Resolution 2334 (2016) Adopted by the Security Council at its 7853rd meeting, on 23 December 2016" (PDF). United Nations. 16 December 2016. Archived from the original on 8 September 2019.
- Riley, Russell L. (1 September 2016). Inside the Clinton White House: An Oral History. Oxford University Press. p. 253. ISBN 978-0-19-060547-6. "Camp David is a bit of a Rashomon event. There is the American Camp David, there is the Palestinian Camp David, and there is the Israeli Camp David"
- Robinson, Glenn E. (2018). "Chapter 6 Palestine". In Gasiorowski, Mark; L.Yom, Sean (eds.). The Government and Politics of the Middle East and North Africa. Taylor & Francis. ISBN 978-0-429-97411-3.
- Rokem, Jonathan (20 January 2013). "Politics and Conflict in a Contested City". Bulletin du Centre de recherche français à Jérusalem (23): 719–736.
- Rosen, Maya; Shaul, Yehuda (December 2020). Highway to Annexation: Israeli Road and Transportation Infrastructure Development in the West Bank (PDF) (Report). The Israeli Centre for Public Affairs & Breaking the Silence. p. 39.
- Roy, Sara (2004). "The Palestinian-Israeli Conflict and Palestinian Socioeconomic Decline: A Place Denied". International Journal of Politics, Culture, and Society. 17 (3): 365–403. doi:10.1023/B:IJPS.0000019609.37719.99. JSTOR 20007687. S2CID 145653769.
- Rubenberg, Cheryl, ed. (2010). Encyclopedia of the Israeli-Palestinian Conflict: A-H (3rd ed.). Lynne Rienner Publishers. ISBN 978-1-588-26686-6.
- Sabel, Robbie (Fall 2011). "The Campaign to Delegitimize Israel with the False Charge of Apartheid". Jewish Political Studies Review. 23 (3/4): 18–31. JSTOR 41575857.
- Safire, William (31 December 2006). "Year of the Stans". The New York Times Magazine. ISSN 0362-4331.
- Samuels, Ben; Lis, Jonathan (26 October 2021). "U.S. Gives Harshest Public Rebuke Yet on Israeli Settlement Plans". Haaretz.
- Shafir, Gershon (2017). A Half Century of Occupation: Israel, Palestine, and the World's Most Intractable Conflict. University of California Press. ISBN 978-0-520-29350-2.
- Shain, Milton (2019). "The Roots of Anti-Zionism in South Africa and the Delegitimization of Israel". In Rosenfeld, Alvin H. (ed.). Anti-Zionism and Antisemitism: The Dynamics of Delegitimization. Indiana University Press. pp. 397–413. ISBN 978-0-253-03874-6.
- Shalev, Chemi (6 June 2017). "Netanyahu's Blueprint for a Palestinian Bantustan". Haaretz.
- Shany, Yuval (6 May 2019). "Israel's New Plan to Annex the West Bank: What Happens Next?". Lawfare.
- Shaul, Yehuda (11 February 2020). "Trump's Middle East Peace Plan Isn't New. It Plagiarized a 40-Year-Old Israeli Initiative". Foreign Policy.
- Sherwood, Harriet (28 June 2020). "Israel's cabinet meets to finalise annexation plans". The Guardian.
- Shezaf, Hagar (10 December 2020). "Highways to annexation: Across the West Bank, Israel is bulldozing a bright future for Jewish settlers". Haaretz.
- "Six-Month Report on Israeli settlements in the occupied West Bank, including East Jerusalem Reporting period January–July 2020" (PDF). Office of the European Union Representative (West Bank and Gaza Strip, UNRWA). 8 March 2021.
- Slater, Jerome (2001). "What Went Wrong? The Collapse of the Israeli-Palestinian Peace Process". Political Science Quarterly. 116 (2): 171–199. doi:10.2307/798058. JSTOR 798058.
- Slater, Jerome (2020). Mythologies Without End: The US, Israel, and the Arab-Israeli Conflict, 1917-2020. Oxford University Press. ISBN 978-0-19-045908-6.
- Srivastava, Mehul (17 June 2020). "Israel's annexation plan: the 'existential threat' to Palestinian dreams". Financial Times.
- Stephens, Philip (21 February 2013). "Settler policy imperils Israel's foundations". Financial Times.
- Stock, Nathan (August 2019). There is no "Status Quo", Drivers of Violence in the Israeli-Palestinian Conflict (PDF) (Report). Middle East Institute.
- Stone, I.F. (3 August 1967). "Holy War, Review of "Le conflit israélo-arabe" in Les Temps Modernes". The New York Review of Books. Archived from the original on 29 March 2017.
- Strickland, Patrick O. (12 February 2015). "Residents in occupied Golan Heights fear creeping Israeli presence". Middle East Eye.
- Taraki, Lisa (Summer 2008). "Enclave Micropolis: The Paradoxical Case of Ramallah/Al-Bireh" (PDF). Journal of Palestine Studies. 37 (4): 6–20. doi:10.1525/jps.2008.37.4.6.
- Telhami, Shibley (2010). The Sadat Lectures: Words and Images on Peace, 1997-2008. U.S. Institute of Peace Press. ISBN 978-1-60127-054-2.
- "Text of Begin's Plan for West Bank and Gaza Strip". The New York Times. 27 December 1977.
- Tharoor, Ishaan (29 January 2020). "Trump's 'deal of the century' is no deal at all". The Washington Post.
- Thawaba, Salem; Al-Rimmawi, Hussein (23 August 2012). "Spatial Transformation of Jerusalem: 1967 to Present" (PDF). Journal of Planning History. 12 (1): 63–77. doi:10.1177/1538513212454811. ISSN 1538-5132. S2CID 144445414.
- Thrall, Nathan (2017). The Only Language They Understand: Forcing Compromise in Israel and Palestine. Henry Holt and Company. ISBN 978-1-62779-710-8.
- Toynbee, Arnold (January 1931). "The Present Situation in Palestine". International Affairs. 10 (1): 38–68. doi:10.2307/3015929. JSTOR 3015929.
- "UN experts say Israeli settlement expansion 'tramples' on human rights law". Geneva: OHCHR. 3 November 2021.
- "UN Special Rapporteur urges Israel to end occupation". The New Arab. 25 December 2021.
- Usher, Graham (20 May 1999). Dispatches from Palestine: The Rise and Fall of the Oslo Peace Process. University of Alberta. p. 35. ISBN 978-0-7453-1337-5.
- Weizman, Eyal (2006). "The Architecture of Ariel Sharon". Third Text. 20 (3–4): 337–353. doi:10.1080/09528820600900745. S2CID 144717482.
- Weizman, Eyal (2012). Hollow Land: Israel's Architecture of Occupation. Verso Books. ISBN 978-1-84467-868-6.
- Wing, Adrien Katherine (4–8 April 2000). "The South African Transition to Democratic Rule: Lessons for International and Comparative Law". Proceedings of the ASIL Annual Meeting. 94: 254–259. doi:10.1017/S0272503700055932. JSTOR 25659407. S2CID 107537477.
- Yiftachel, Oren (2016). "Between One and Two: Apartheid or Confederation for Israel/Palestine?". In Ehrenberg, John; Peled, Yoav (eds.). Israel and Palestine: Alternative Perspectives on Statehood. Rowman & Littlefield. pp. 305–336. ISBN 978-1-442-24508-2.
- Zertal, Idith; Eldar, Akiva (2009) [2007]. Lords of the Land: The War Over Israel's Settlements in the Occupied Territories, 1967-2007. Hachette UK. ISBN 978-0-786-74485-5.
- Ziegler, Jean (31 October 2003). "The right to food Report by the Special Rapporteur, Jean Ziegler Addendum Mission to the Occupied Palestinian Territories". United Nations.
