= Patrick Baert =

Belgian sociologist

- Born: 23 January 1961 (age 65); Brussels, Belgium

Academic background
- Education: Vrije Universiteit Brussel; Oxford University

Academic work
- Discipline: sociology
- Institutions: University of Cambridge
- Main interests: social theory

Patrick Baert (born 23 January 1961, in Brussels) is a Belgian sociologist and social theorist, based in Britain. He is a professor of Social Theory at the University of Cambridge and Fellow of Selwyn College, Cambridge.

Baert studied at the Vrije Universiteit Brussel (VUB) and at Oxford University where he obtained his D.Phil. in 1990. In Oxford, he studied with Rom Harré and wrote his dissertation on George Herbert Mead's notion of time and its relevance for social theory, subsequently published as Time, Self and Social Being. He carried out postdoctoral work with Claude Javeau in Brussels and Anthony Giddens in Cambridge before taking up a teaching position at Cambridge. He has held various visiting positions, including at Brown University, the University of Cape Town, the CNRS/EHESS and the University of British Columbia. His most recent books include The Existentialist Moment: The Rise of Sartre as a Public Intellectual and Conflict in the Academy: A Study in the Sociology of Intellectuals (co-written with Marcus Morgan). He also published Social Theory in the Twentieth Century and Beyond, and Philosophy of the Social Sciences: Towards Pragmatism. Since January 2013, he is the Editor-in-Chief of the International Journal of Politics, Culture, and Society.

Baert's recent work lies at the intersection between the sociology of intellectuals and intellectual history. The Existentialist Moment explains the sudden rise of Sartre as a public intellectual in the mid-1940s. In this book Baert describes the reshaping of the intellectual and cultural field in France during WWII and he shows how Sartre was able to present a neat vocabulary to make sense of and come to terms with the trauma of the war. Baert pays particular attention to the trials of French collaborationist intellectuals in which the notion of responsibility loomed large – a notion which also became central in the broader cultural realm at the time. During this period, Sartre redefined his philosophy, making it simpler and more digestable, centring it around this notion of responsibility of the intellectual. Hence his idea of the engaged intellectual which also became a guiding principle of the journal Les Temps modernes.

Towards the end of The Existentialist Moment Baert also discusses the gradual decline of interest in Sartre and existentialism from the early 1960s onwards. With the rise and institutionalisation of the social sciences, expert public intellectuals gained in significance in comparison with authoritative public intellectuals. Authoritative public intellectuals like Sartre rely on their privileged parcours and elite training to speak with moral vigour about a wide range of social and political issues without necessarily having expertise in them. Expert public intellectuals draw on methodological training and expertise in the social sciences to intervene politically. In this context, the rise of structuralism in the late 1950s and 1950s is particularly significant. In contrast with existentialism (which was very much embedded in the humanities), structuralism was compatible with the emerging social sciences (and indeed with other theoretical currents such as Marxism and psychoanalysis).

The last chapter of The Existentialst Moment develops the theoretical framework – positioning theory – that underpins the book. This frame of reference also guides partly Conflict in the Academy although the latter also draws explicitly on insights from cultural sociology.

Baert's earlier work deals with the philosophy of social sciences. He argues against several existing contributions to the philosophy of social sciences. Against those philosophies of social science that infer prescriptions for the social sciences based on attempts to demarcate science from non-science, he argues that developments in the history and sociology of science have undermined the validity of the notion of demarcation. Contrary to those social scientists who liken their empirical research to an arbitration court that helps to decide the fate of the theory or research programme under consideration, he contends that research in the social sciences relies on theoretical presuppositions which are contestable – and contested – to such an extent that empirical research cannot be regarded as a straightforward testing device. In opposition to what he coins ‘the social cartography model’ (according to which high-quality social research captures the inner essence of the social world as accurately and completely as possible and social theory provides the conceptual building blocks for this representation), he argues that it is not fruitful to conceive of research in terms of the passive recording of the external world, and that this representational model ultimately leads to theoretical ossification.

Baert argues in favour of a neo-pragmatist philosophy of social science which promotes social research in the pursuit of self-referential knowledge. Whereas many contributions to the philosophy of social science assume that social research is primarily an explanatory (and possibly predictive) endeavor, Baert contends that this picture does not correspond to the actual practice of social research. He points out that few significant contributions to sociology – and social research in general – are straightforward explanatory works, and even fewer are exclusively explanatory. Baert's position is that most of those groundbreaking works involve ‘self-referential knowledge’: they enable communities to re-describe and re-conceptualise themselves and their presuppositions. Inspired by Rorty's neo-pragmatism, he has argued in favour of the pursuit of self-referential knowledge, and he has analysed the methodological strategies that make this possible in various disciplines, ranging from archaeology and social anthropology to sociology and history. For instance, Nietzsche's genealogical history can provide contemporary communities with tools that enable them to re-evaluate the moral and cognitive categories they use to describe the world and their place within it. Baer's notion of self-referential knowledge relates to the German notion of Bildung or self-edification and with a new role for intellectuals, whereby they facilitate envisaging alternative socio-political scenarios rather than presenting a set of normative or epistemological foundations.

A special issue of the journal Human Studies was dedicated to a symposium around Baert's Philosophy of the Social Sciences: Towards Pragmatism. In this issue Stephen Turner questioned Baert's attempt to promote dialogue whilst holding onto a notion of expertise. In the same issue Paul Roth argues that Baert contradicts himself: whilst rightly rejecting the notion of a scientific method, Baert then surprisingly suggests a method for pursuing self-referential knowledge. Bohman contends that Baert underestimates the ability of social scientists to develop generalisations which can lead to emancipatory political agendas. For a critical exchange between Baert and Peter Manicas, see the Journal of Critical Realism; Whilst sympathetic to Dewey, Manicas disagrees with Baert's neo-pragmatism. For a critical exchange between Patrick Baert/Filipe Carreira da Silva and Simon Susen (in relation to Baert and Silva's 2010 book), see the journal Distinktion; Scandinavian Journal of Social Theory. Whilst sympathetic, Susen laments, for instance, Baert and Carreira da Silva's anti-foundationalism.
