= Roarty =

Roarty is a surname. Notable people with this surname include:

- Ben Roarty (born 1975), Australian rugby league footballer
- Michael Roarty (1928–2013), American marketing executive

== See also ==
- Rorty
