= List of Sadat Lecture for Peace Speakers =

The Sadat Lecture for Peace is a lecture series at the University of Maryland, College Park, which began in 1997 when the Anwar Sadat Chair for Peace and Development was established within The Center for International Development and Conflict Management (which is associated with the Department of Government & Politics). The Sadat Chair, currently held by Shibley Telhami, was established by Jehan Sadat in memory of her late husband, Anwar Sadat, the former President of Egypt.

Year	Speaker	Notes
1997	Ezer Weizman	President of Israel
1998	Jimmy Carter	Former President of the United States
1999	No Speaker	
2000	Henry Kissinger	Former U.S. Secretary of State
2001	Nelson Mandela	Former President of South Africa
2002	Kofi Annan	Secretary General of the United Nations
2003	No Speaker	
2004	Mary Robinson	Former President of Ireland
2005	James Baker	Former U.S. Secretary of State
2006	Dr. Mohamed Elbaradei	Director General of the International Atomic Energy Agency
2010	Madeleine Albright	Former U.S. Secretary of State
2012	Zbigniew Brzezinski and Stephen Hadley	Former U.S. National Security Advisors
2013	14th Dalai Lama	Current Dalai Lama of Tibetan Buddhism
