= Matityahu Drobles =

Israeli politician (1931–2018)

- מתתיהו דרובלס
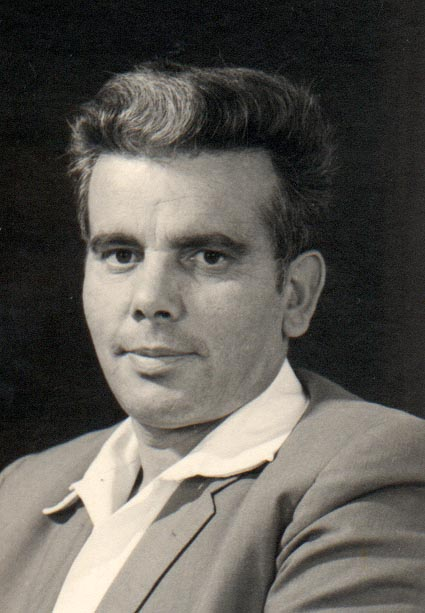
- Drobles in the 1970s

Faction represented in the Knesset
- 1972–1974: Gahal
- 1974–1977: Likud

Personal details
- Born: 20 April 1931 Warsaw, Poland
- Died: 21 October 2018 (aged 87)

Matityahu Drobles (Hebrew: מתתיהו דרובלס; 20 April 1931 – 21 October 2018) was an Israeli politician who served as a member of the Knesset for Gahal and Likud between 1972 and 1977.

== Biography ==
Drobles was born in Warsaw in Poland. He was interned in the Warsaw Ghetto and later lived in the woods during World War II. In 1946 he moved to Buenos Aires in Argentina, where he attended high school. In Argentina he joined the Betar youth movement, becoming a member of its national leadership, and director of training. He was also a member of the Council for Zionist Youth Movements in Argentina, before emigrating to Israel in 1950.

He was amongst the founders of moshav Mevo Beitar, and a member of the Mishkei Herut Beitar settlement movement, serving as its representative to immigrant settlements around Jerusalem and the West Bank. Between 1962 and 1973 he was deputy chairman of Mateh Yehuda Regional Council. In 1967 he became chairman of Mishkei Herut Beitar's settlement department, and was responsible for establishing Israeli settlements around Rafah and the Jordan Valley between 1974 and 1977.

== Political and public career ==
Drobles was on the Gahal list for the 1969 Knesset elections. Although he failed to win a seat, he entered the Knesset on 26 February 1972 as a replacement for the deceased Yosef Sapir. He was re-elected in 1973, but lost his seat in the 1977 elections.

In 1978 he became a member of the board of the Jewish Agency and World Zionist Organization, serving as chairman of the WZO's settlement department from 1978 until 1992. In 1992 he became head of the Central Zionist Archives.

== Awards and recognition ==
In 2011 Drobles was chosen to light one of the torches in the state ceremony marking Israel's 63rd anniversary.
