= Yuval Shany =

Israeli international law expert (born 1969)

- יובל שני
- Born: March 28, 1969 (age 57); Israel

Academic background
- Education: Hebrew University (LL.B); New York University School of Law (L.L.M); (University of London (PhD)

Academic work
- Discipline: Law
- Sub-discipline: Humanitarian law, Human rights
- Institutions: Hebrew University of Jerusalem

Yuval Shany (Hebrew: יובל שני) is an Israeli academic, scholar of humanitarian law and human rights. He holds the Hersch Lauterpacht Chair in Public International Law at Hebrew University. In 2018, Shany was elected Chair of the United Nations Human Rights Committee, a committee of scholars who review compliance of member states with the International Covenant on Civil and Political Rights. As of 2018, he is deputy president of the Israel Democracy Institute.

Shany holds an LLB from the Hebrew University of Jerusalem (1995), an LLM in International Legal Studies from New York University (1997), and a PhD in International Law from the SOAS, University of London (2001).
