= International Journal of Politics, Culture, and Society =

Academic journal

International Journal of Politics, Culture, & Society
- Discipline: Political science, social theory, economics
- Language: English
- Edited by: Patrick Baert

Publication details
- History: 1987-present
- Publisher: Springer Science+Business Media
- Frequency: Quarterly
- Impact factor: 1.1 (2022)

Standard abbreviations
- ISO 4: Int. J. Politics Cult. Soc.

Indexing
- CODEN: ICSOE2
- ISSN: 0891-4486 (print); 1573-3416 (web)
- LCCN: 88647721
- JSTOR: 08914486
- OCLC no.: 290582467

Links
- Journal homepage; Online archive

The International Journal of Politics, Culture, and Society is a quarterly peer-reviewed academic journal covering political science, social theory, and economics. The editor-in-chief is Patrick Baert (University of Cambridge). It was established in 1987 and is published by Springer Science+Business Media.

== Abstracting and indexing ==
The journal is abstracted and indexed in:

- EBSCO databases
- Emerging Sources Citation Index
- International Bibliography of the Social Sciences
- International Political Science Abstracts
- ProQuest databases
- Scopus
