= Ghazi Falah =

Bedouin Israeli-Canadian geographer

Ghazi-Walid Falah (Arabic: غازي فلاح, Hebrew: ראזי פלאח) is a Bedouin Israeli Palestinian-Canadian geographer, who was a tenured professor at the University of Akron, Ohio. He is an expert on political, social and urban geography of the Middle East and the Arab World, with special emphasis on Israel. He has published over 45 articles in 23 peer-reviewed journals, and he has given papers at conferences. He is author and co-editor of five books and monographs, including Geographies of Muslim Women (Guilford Publications, 2005), co-edited with Caroline Nagel. He also has co-authored articles with colleagues, David Newman and Colin Flint, with whom he has conducted joint research.

Falah is a founder of the Toronto-based peer review international journal The Arab World Geographer and serves as its Editor-in-Chief. The journal is published in English and features research on the geography of the Arab, Muslim, and Middle-Eastern worlds.

== Biography ==
=== Early years ===
Falah was born in the village of Falahat Al Batouf, Galilee, Israel. He earned his B.A and M.A from the Hebrew University of Jerusalem in Israel and a PhD in Geography from Durham University in England. After completing his doctorate in 1982, Falah taught geography for a short period at Tel Aviv University in Israel, and at An-Najah University and in Hebron in the West Bank.

In 1987, he established the Galilee Center for Social Research in Nazareth, a research institute focused on Arab communities living in Israel, and he served as its first Executive Director until relocating to North America in 1991. There he was appointed as Fulbright Scholar and Visiting Associate Professor of Geography at the University of Northern Iowa.

=== Canada ===
In 1993, Falah migrated to Canada and subsequently became a Canadian citizen. He started a new chapter in his academic career in Toronto, with a grant from the MacArthur Foundation, and was based at the University of Toronto as Visiting Associate Professor in the Department of Geography and Planning. During that same period, he was also a visiting scholar for five months at the University of Paris, Sorbonne, supported by a French CNRS research grant. His research has included studies of the differential distribution of facilities in Israeli Jewish and Arab areas.

He joined the University of Toronto Centre for Urban and Community Studies in 1995 as Research Associate, remaining there until 2001. While working on his research in Toronto, Falah also served, 1995-1997, as Lecturer at the University of Wales, Lampeter, a center for studies on the Muslim world. He then returned to the U.S., and accepted a position in the Department of Geography and Planning at the University of Akron in Ohio.

=== Detention and release ===
He was held for over three weeks in an Israeli jail after he was arrested on suspicion of espionage on July 8, 2006, while touring near the Lebanon border. The arrest occurred one week before the 2006 Israeli-Lebanon conflict. He was denied access to a lawyer for the first 18 days of his detention.

On July 30, 2006, the Israeli Shin Bet security service and the Israeli police released Falah without filing charges against him.

=== Recent activities ===
In recent years, Falah has broadened his interests to include the geography of the media, focusing on the representation of Arabs and Muslims in daily newspapers in the U.S. Ghazi Falah was a tenured Full Professor at the University of Akron through around 2020. In 2021, he worked as a researcher at the College of Security and Global Studies, American University in the Emirates in Dubai, United Arab Emirates, and in 2023 was working at the Department of Geography, College of Social Sciences at Mutah University, Al Karak, Jordan.
