= Shibley Telhami =

Palestinian American professor of government and political advisor

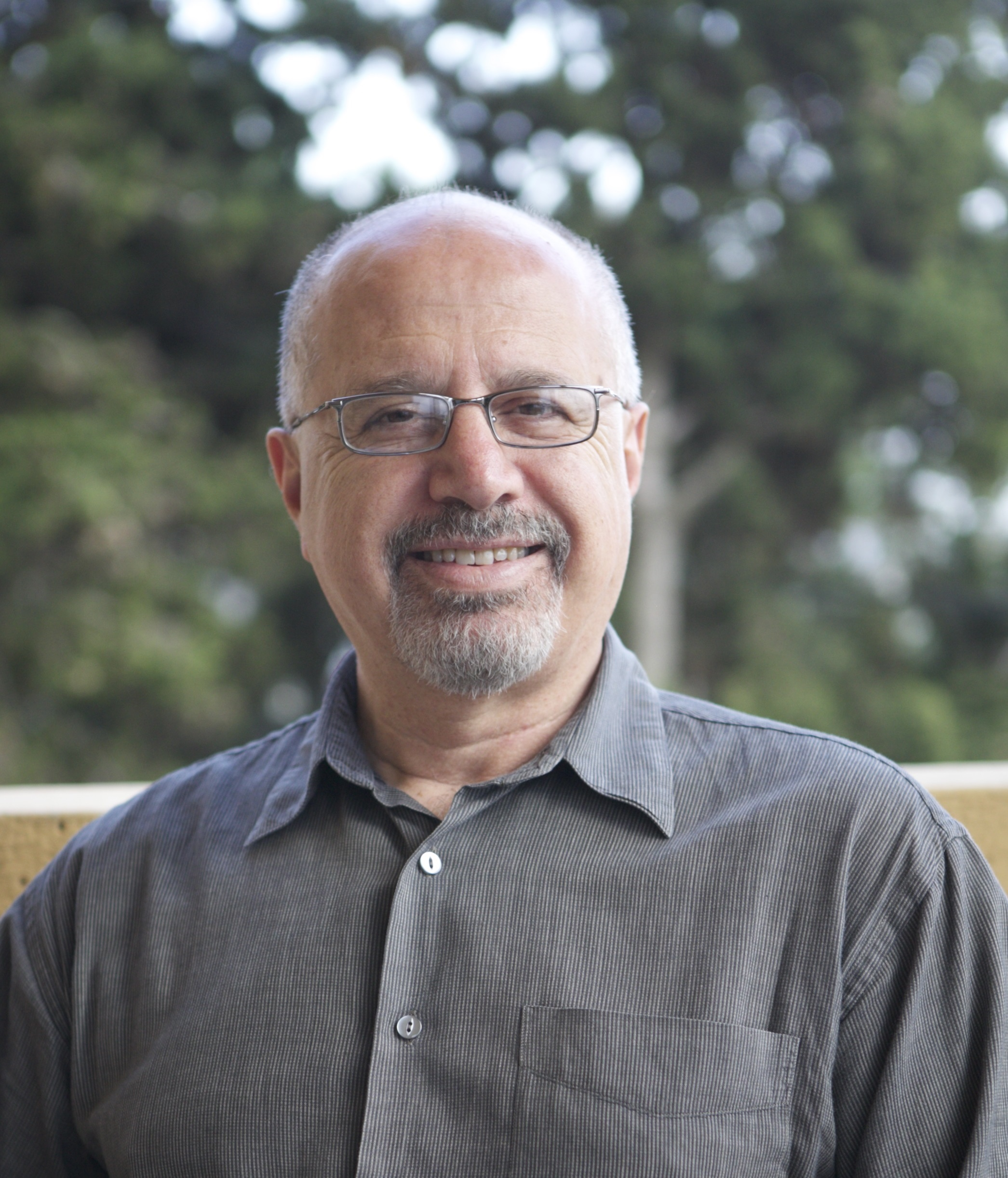
- Born: July 31, 1951 (age 75)
- Education: University of California at Berkeley (Ph.D.)
- Occupations: Anwar Sadat Professor for Peace and Development
- Website: https://sadat.umd.edu/

Shibley Telhami (Arabic: شبلي تلحمي) is an American professor in the department of government and politics at the University of Maryland, College Park, and a nonresident senior fellow of the Center for Middle East Policy at the Brookings Institution.

== Life ==
Telhami was born into an Arab family in Israel but has lived his entire adult life in the United States. He is fluent in Arabic, Hebrew, and English. He advised in one way or another every U.S. administration from George H. W. Bush to Barack Obama.

== Career ==
Telhami is a political scientist specializing in international relations, American foreign policy, and Middle Eastern politics with a particular focus on the role of public opinion. He is the author and editor of numerous books and academic articles and contributes to various periodicals and newspapers.

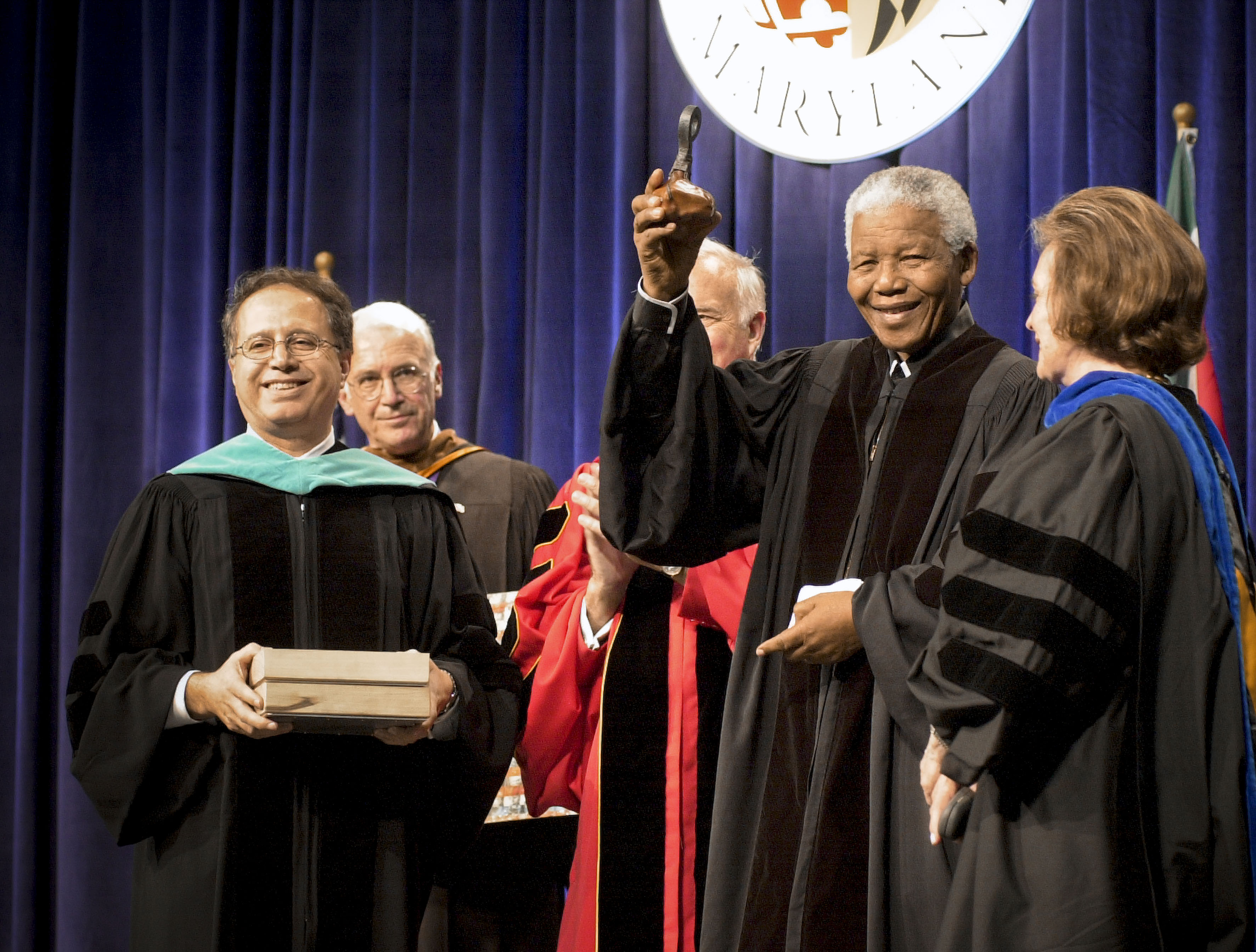
Shibley Telhami and Nelson Mandela at the Sadat Lecture for Peace held at the University of Maryland on November 14, 2001

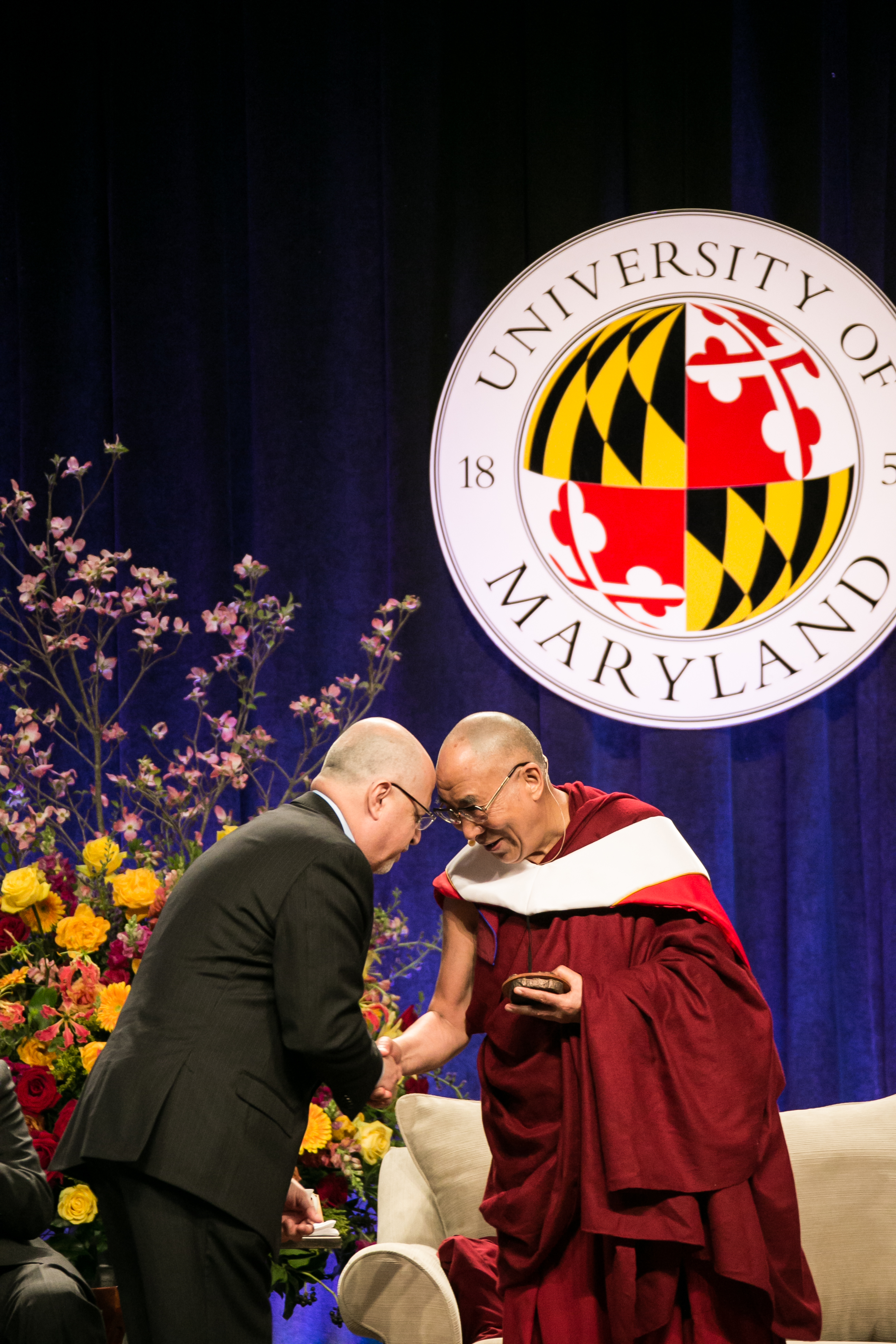
Shibley Telhami and the 14th Dalai Lama of Tibet at the Sadat Lecture for Peace, hosted at the University of Maryland on May 7, 2013

Before coming to the University of Maryland, he taught at several universities, including Cornell University, the Ohio State University, the University of Southern California, Princeton University, Columbia University, Swarthmore College, and the University of California at Berkeley, where he received his doctorate in political science. In 2016, he established and assumed the directorship of the University of Maryland Critical Issues Poll, which probes American public opinion on domestic and foreign policy issues.

Telhami has also been active in foreign policy. He has served as advisor to the U.S. Mission to the U.N. (1990–91), as advisor to former Congressman Lee H. Hamilton, and as a member of the U.S. delegation to the Trilateral U.S.-Israeli-Palestinian Anti-Incitement Committee, which was mandated by the Wye River Agreements. He also served on the Iraq Study Group as a member of the Strategic Environment Working Group. He has contributed to The Washington Post, The New York Times, and the Los Angeles Times and regularly appears on national and international radio and television. He has served on the U.S. Advisory Group on Public Diplomacy for the Arab and Muslim World, which was appointed by the Department of State at Congress's request, and he co-drafted the report of their findings, Changing Minds, Winning Peace. He has also co-drafted several Council on Foreign Relations reports on U.S. public diplomacy, on the Arab-Israeli peace process, and on Persian Gulf security.

Telhami is a member of the Council on Foreign Relations and has served on the board of the Education for Employment Foundation, several academic advisory boards, and has served on the board of Human Rights Watch (and as chair of the Advisory Committee of Human Rights Watch/Middle East). He has also served on the board of the United States Institute of Peace. Telhami received the Distinguished International Service Award from the University of Maryland in 2002 and the Excellence in Public Service Award from the University System of Maryland Board of Regents in 2006. He was selected by the Carnegie Corporation of New York with the New York Times as one of the "Great Immigrants" for 2013. He also received the University of Maryland's Honors College 2014 Outstanding Faculty Award.

As part of the Anwar Sadat Chair for Peace and Development, Telhami established an international lecture series titled the Sadat Lecture for Peace.

== Bibliography ==
Telhami's book The Stakes: America and the Middle East (Westview Press, 2003; updated version, 2004) was selected by Foreign Affairs as one of the top five books on the Middle East in 2003. His other publications include Power and Leadership in International Bargaining: The Path to the Camp David Accords (1990); International Organizations and Ethnic Conflict, ed. with Milton Esman (1995); Identity and Foreign Policy in the Middle East, ed. with Michael Barnett (2002); The Sadat Lectures: Words and Images on Peace, 1997-2008, and numerous articles on international politics and Middle Eastern affairs.

Among his books are The One State Reality: What is Israel/Palestine? (2023) (co-edited with Michael Barnett, Nathan Brown, and Marc Lynch), The World Through Arab Eyes: Arab Public Opinion and the Reshaping of the Middle East (2013), and The Peace Puzzle: America's Quest for Arab-Israeli Peace, 1989-2011 (2013)..
