= Rorty =

Rorty is a surname. Notable people with the surname include:

- Amélie Rorty (1932–2020), Belgian-born American philosopher
- James Rorty (1890–1973), American radical writer and poet, father of Richard Rorty
- Malcolm C. Rorty (1875–1937), American economist
- Richard Rorty (1931–2007), American philosopher
