= United States recognition of Jerusalem as capital of Israel =

Proclamation on Recognizing Jerusalem as the Capital of the State of Israel and Relocating the United States Embassy to Israel
- President Trump gives a statement on Jerusalem and the US embassy in Tel Aviv.

U.S. Presidential Proclamation
- Territorial extent: United States; Israel; Palestine (Note: The international community recognizes East Jerusalem as the territory for an independent Palestinian state, thus rejecting Israel's claim to that half of the city, and likewise falling under what are internationally recognized as Israeli-occupied territories.)
- Signed by: Donald Trump
- Signed: December 6, 2017
- Status: Current legislation

On December 6, 2017, the United States officially recognized Jerusalem as the capital city of Israel. U.S. president Donald Trump, who signed the presidential proclamation, also ordered the relocation of the American diplomatic mission to Jerusalem from Tel Aviv, constituting what is now the Embassy of the United States in Jerusalem, which was established on the grounds of the former Consulate General of the United States in Jerusalem. Israeli prime minister Benjamin Netanyahu welcomed the decision and praised the announcement by the Trump administration. On December 8, U.S. Secretary of State Rex Tillerson clarified that Trump's statement "did not indicate any final status for Jerusalem" and "was very clear that the final status, including the borders, would be left to the two parties to negotiate and decide" in reference to the recognition's impact on the Israeli–Palestinian peace process.

Trump's decision was rejected by the vast majority of world leaders; the United Nations Security Council held an emergency meeting on December 7, where 14 out of 15 members condemned it, but the motion was overturned by U.S. veto power. The United Kingdom, France, Japan, Italy, and Sweden were among the countries who criticized Trump's decision at the meeting. Other countries supported the move; Guatemala affirmed their intent to issue a follow-up on the U.S. recognition and relocate their diplomatic mission to Jerusalem from Tel Aviv, and the Czech Republic, Honduras, Paraguay, and Romania stated that they were also considering the same course of action. Italian politician Federica Mogherini, as the foreign policy chief of the European Union (EU), stated that all EU member countries were united on the issue of Jerusalem—she reaffirmed the EU's firm stance on East Jerusalem being the capital of an independent Palestinian state. By late 2022, only Guatemala, Honduras, and Kosovo had established diplomatic missions to Israel in Jerusalem; Paraguay reversed their 2018 decision within months, and the Honduran foreign ministry has since stated that they are considering a reversal of their decision as well.

The Palestinian Authority stated that the recognition and relocation disqualifies the U.S. from mediating peace talks, while Hamas called for the beginning of a new intifada against Israel in the aftermath of Trump's declaration. Following the U.S. announcement, Palestinians held demonstrations throughout the West Bank and the Gaza Strip, and pro-Palestinian demonstrations were held in various countries around the world. By December 25, 2017, Palestinian militants in Gaza had fired almost 30 rockets towards Israel; though almost half of these landed within Gaza, two of them inflicted minor property damage in Israel, near the cities of Ashkelon and Sderot. In the aftermath of the attacks, Hamas reportedly arrested the perpetrating militants in an attempt to prevent an Israeli military response, which never occurred.

On February 23, 2018, the U.S. State Department announced that the new American embassy in Israel was scheduled to open in May of that year. It was officially inaugurated in Jerusalem on May 14, 2018—a date coinciding with Israel's 70th Yom Ha'atzmaut. Representatives from 32 countries were present at the event, including EU members Austria, the Czech Republic, and Romania. Along the Gaza–Israel border, the Israeli military responded to a massive Palestinian protest with tear gas and sniper fire, resulting in the deaths of at least 58 Palestinians and marking the highest single-day death toll since the 2014 Gaza War. The Israeli government defended the military's use of force as having been a necessary measure in the face of the protesters' throwing of rocks and explosives towards the Israelis. Just over a year later, on March 25, 2019, the Trump administration signed in another U.S. presidential proclamation recognizing the Golan Heights as part of Israel.

== Background ==
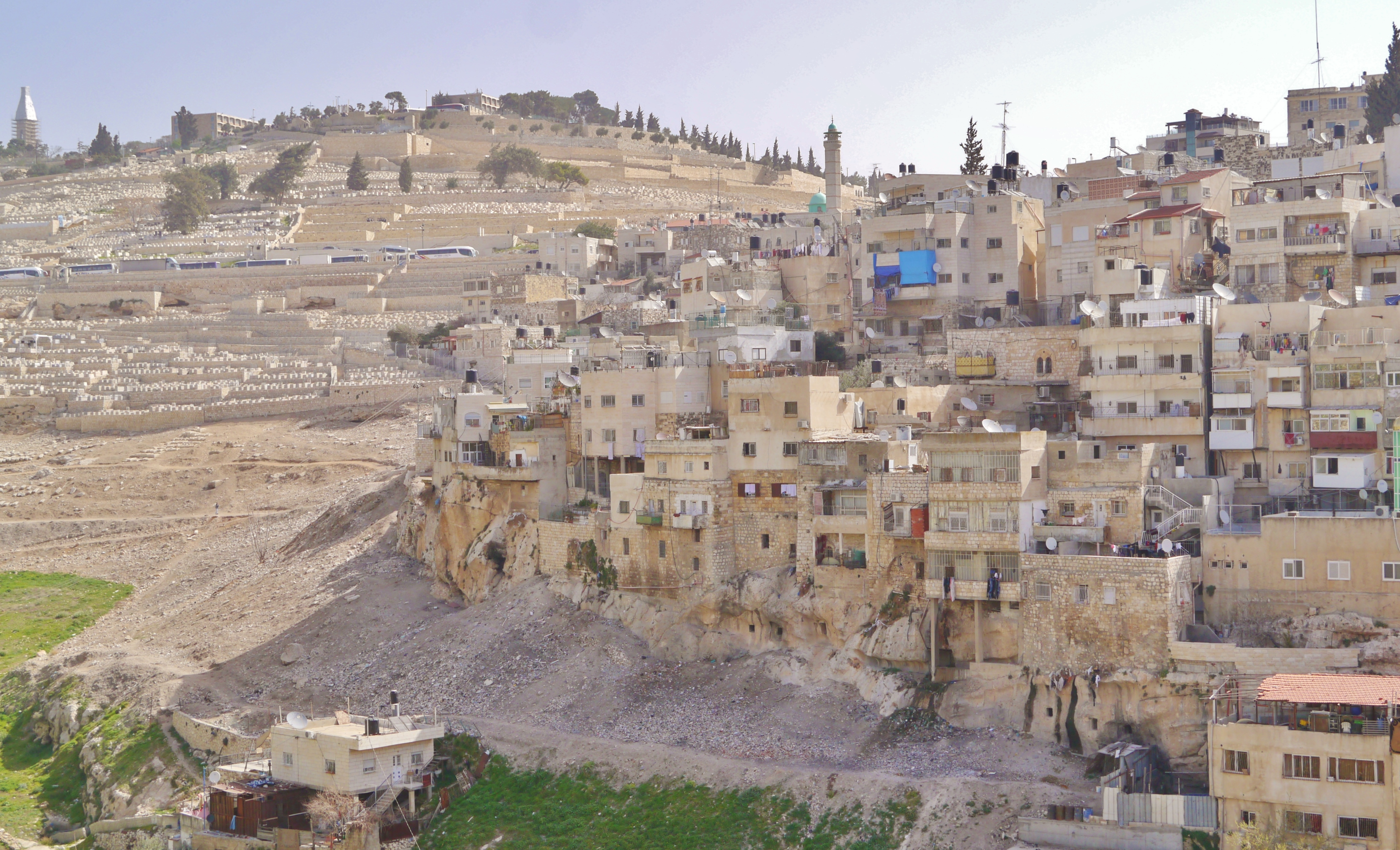
Israel occupied East Jerusalem during the Six-Day War in 1967 and formally annexed it in 1980 (see Jerusalem Law).

After the founding of the State of Israel in 1949, the United States recognized the new state, but considered it desirable to establish an international regime for Jerusalem, with its final status resolved through negotiations. The US opposed Israel's declaration of Jerusalem as its capital in 1949 and opposed Jordan's plan to make Jerusalem its second capital announced in 1950. The US also opposed Israel's annexation of East Jerusalem after the 1967 war. The official United States position has been that the future of Jerusalem should be the subject of a negotiated settlement. Subsequent administrations have maintained the position that Jerusalem's future not be the subject of unilateral actions that could prejudice negotiations, such as by moving the US embassy from Tel Aviv to Jerusalem.

During the 1992 presidential election, Bill Clinton promised that his administration would "support Jerusalem as the capital of the State of Israel" and criticized President George H. W. Bush for having "repeatedly challenged Israel’s sovereignty over a united Jerusalem." However, after the signing of the Oslo Accords in 1993, the Clinton administration did not proceed with their plans in order not to disturb the negotiations between Israel and the Palestinians.

In 1995, Congress passed the Jerusalem Embassy Act, which declared that "Jerusalem should be recognized as the capital of the State of Israel." The bill also stated that the American embassy should move to Jerusalem within five years. Backing the legislation was viewed by some as reflecting American domestic politics. Clinton opposed the Jerusalem Embassy Act and signed a waiver every six months delaying the move.

During the 2000 election campaign, George W. Bush criticized Clinton for not moving the embassy as he had promised to do, and said he planned on initiating the process himself as soon as he was elected. However, once he took office, he backed down on his promise.

In 2008, Democratic candidate Barack Obama called Jerusalem the 'capital of Israel'. On June 4, 2008, Obama told the American Israel Public Affairs Committee (AIPAC), in his first foreign policy speech after capturing the Democratic nomination the day before, that "Jerusalem will remain the capital of Israel, and it must remain undivided." However, he backtracked almost immediately, saying "Well, obviously, it's going to be up to the parties to negotiate a range of these issues. And Jerusalem will be part of those negotiations." The 2012 Democratic National Convention saw a reintroduction of language recognizing Jerusalem as the capital as part of a controversial vote overseen by convention chair Antonio Villaraigosa.

During the 2016 US Presidential election, one of Trump's campaign promises was to move the US embassy in Israel from Tel Aviv to Jerusalem, which he described as the "eternal capital of the Jewish people." On June 1, 2017, Trump signed a waiver on the Jerusalem Embassy Act, delaying the move of the US embassy to Jerusalem for another six months, as had every president before him since 1995. The White House stated that this would help them negotiate a deal between Israel and the Palestinians, and that the promised move would come at a later time.

== Announcement ==
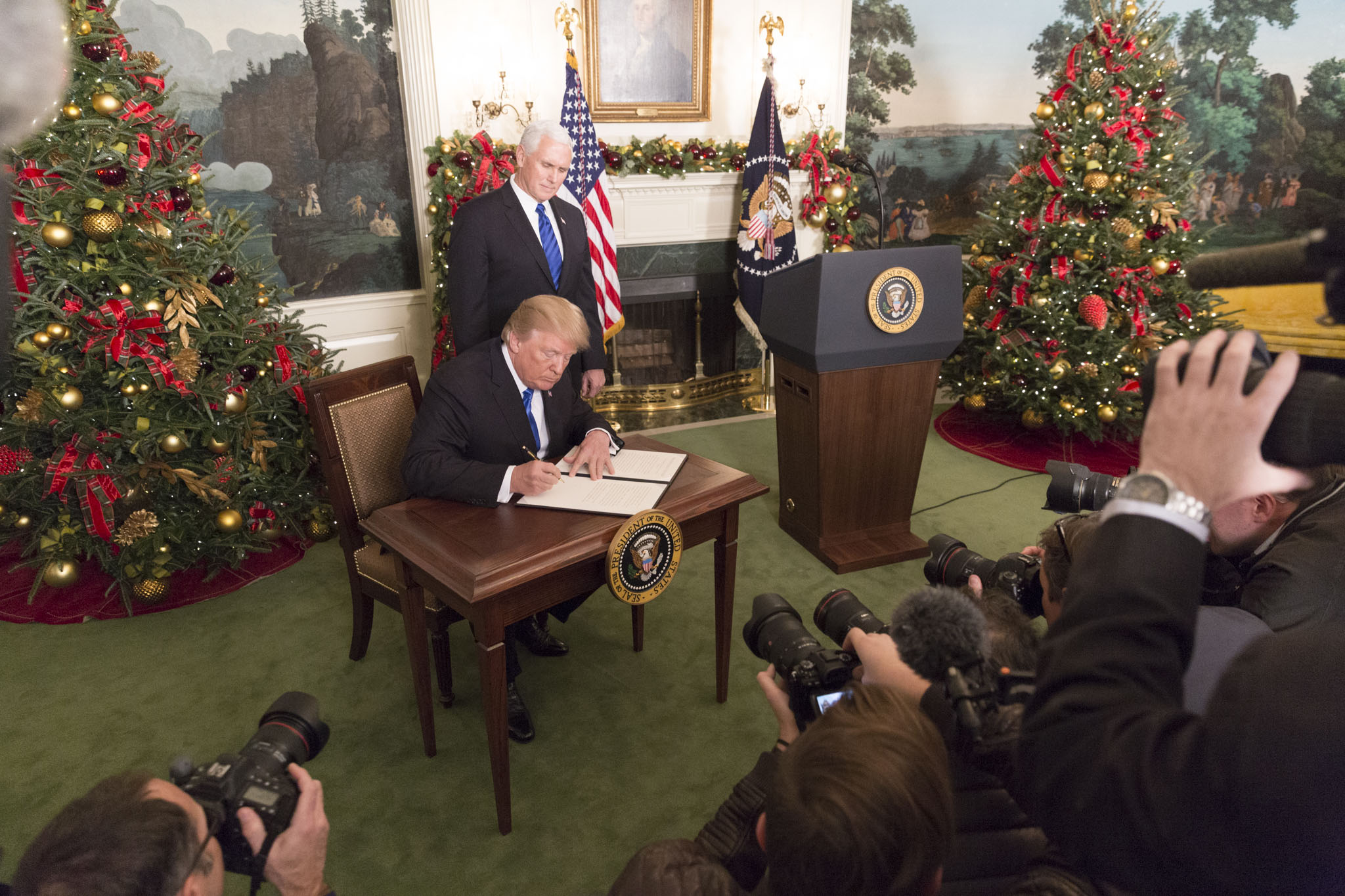
President Trump signing the proclamation, December 6, 2017

On December 6, 2017, President Trump formally recognized Jerusalem as the capital of Israel and stated that the American embassy would be moved from Tel Aviv to Jerusalem. In his statement Donald Trump did not mention East Jerusalem as the capital of a future Palestinian state, but he did say that United States recognition did not resolve the dispute over Jerusalem's borders. President Trump explicitly stated his support for maintaining the status quo of the holy sites within the Old City. Following the announcement, Trump signed the waiver, delaying the move by at least another six months.

Following Trump's announcement, American embassies in Turkey, Jordan, Germany and Britain issued security alerts for Americans traveling or living in those countries. The United States also issues a general warning for Americans abroad about the possibility of violent protests. The American consulate in Jerusalem restricted travel of government employees to Jerusalem's Old City. The US Embassy in Jordan banned employees from leaving the capital and children of embassy employees were told to stay home from school.

=== State Department remarks ===
Secretary of State Rex Tillerson later clarified that the President's statement "did not indicate any final status for Jerusalem" and "was very clear that the final status, including the borders, would be left to the two parties to negotiate and decide." State Department officials said on December 8 that there will not be any immediate practical changes in how the US deals with Jerusalem, including its policy of not listing a country on the passports of citizens born in Jerusalem (a decision changed 3 years later).

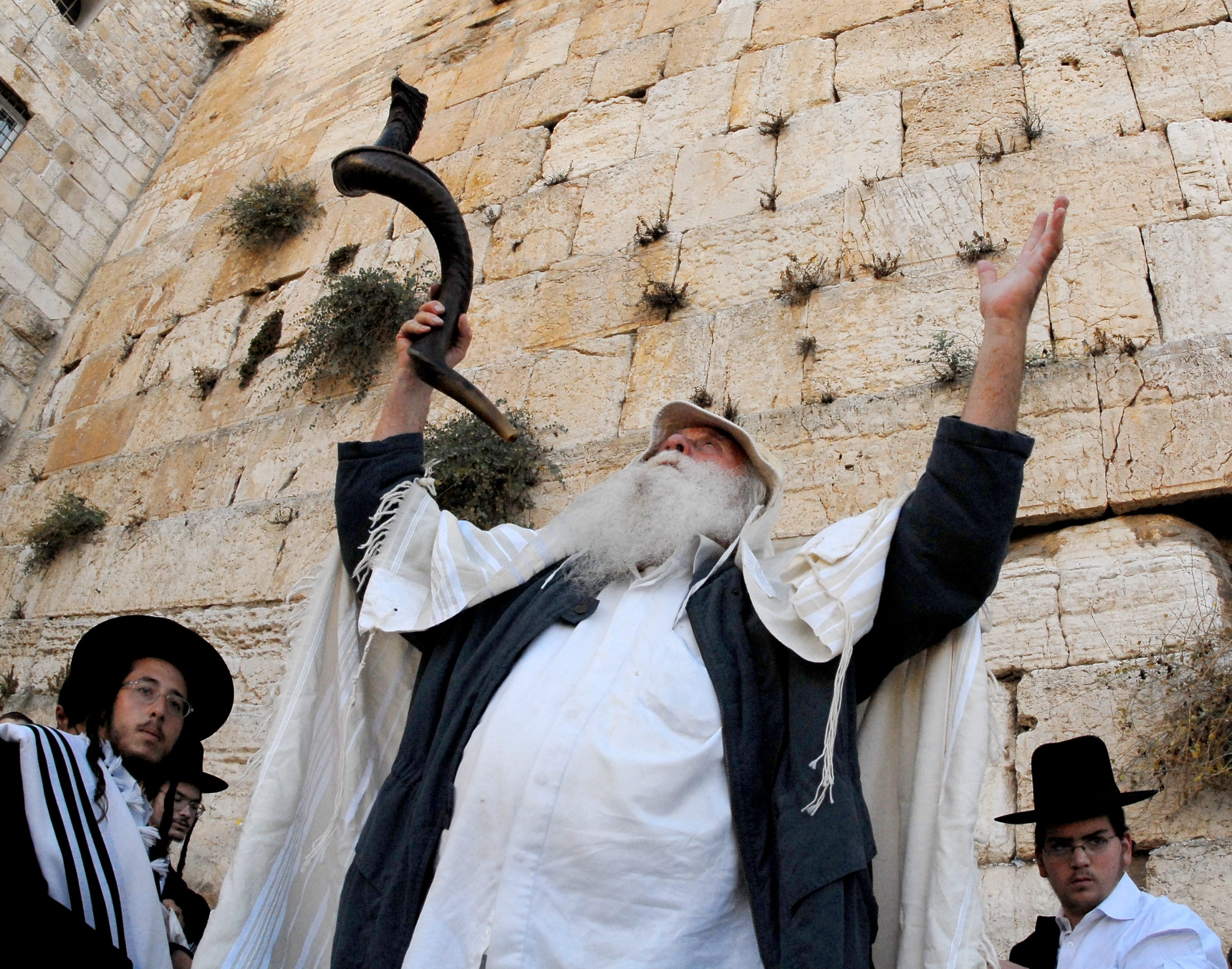
Israeli Jews praying at the Western Wall

When asked what country the Western Wall is in, State Department spokeswoman Heather Nauert said "We're not taking any position on the overall boundaries. We are recognizing Jerusalem as the capital of Israel."

=== American domestic reactions ===
==== Former US ambassadors to Israel ====
Out of 11 former US ambassadors to Israel, nine were critical of Trump's policy change. Ogden R. Reid who served as an ambassador to Israel from 1959 to 1961 was one of the exceptions, saying, "I think it's the right decision." Edward S. Walker Jr. who served from 1997 to 1999 also supported recognition of Jerusalem as Israel's capital: "It's really a question of what are the lines, the borders, to be drawn around the state of Israel and the ultimate state of Palestine." Daniel C. Kurtzer noted America's international isolation in his remarks and Richard H. Jones expressed concerns that moving the embassy would fuel further violence. A number of former ambassadors, such as Martin S. Indyk stated that they were open to recognition of West Jerusalem as Israel's capital, provided Israel would agree to slow settlement construction and recognize East Jerusalem as the Palestinian capital.

==== American Christian organizations ====
American Christian organizations were divided: the National Council of Churches (NCC) which represents 38 different denominations issued a statement saying the change in policy was likely to exacerbate regional conflict and cost lives, while the Liberty Counsel, a right wing evangelical organization, supported the decision. The move had been supported by many conservative American evangelical organizations and leaders including American Christian Leaders for Israel, Jerry Falwell, and Mike Huckabee. Johnnie Moore, one of Trump's evangelical advisers, said the announcement fulfilled a campaign promise to Trump's evangelical voter base. It was also welcomed by Rabbi Yechiel Eckstein, the founder of the International Fellowship of Christians and Jews.

==== American Jewish organizations ====
The majority of prominent American Jewish organizations welcomed the move, including the Conference of Presidents of Major American Jewish Organizations, which comprises 51 national Jewish organizations, as well as by a number of its member organizations: AIPAC, the Jewish Federations of North America, the American Jewish Congress, the American Jewish Committee, Hadassah, the Union of Orthodox Jewish Congregations of America and the National Council of Young Israel. The Conservative Movement's US, Israel and global branches also welcomed US recognition of Jerusalem as the capital of Israel. Orthodox Union, the US' largest umbrella organization representing Orthodox Jews, thanked Trump for "beginning the process of relocating the US Embassy to Jerusalem".

The Anti-Defamation League said recognition was "important and long overdue", while continuing to express support for a two state solution. AIPAC expressed its support for an "undivided Jerusalem" but also said that relocating the American embassy to Jerusalem would not "prejudge the outcome of the Israeli-Palestinian peace process". Morton Klein, who heads the Zionist Organization of America, said that Trump was "finally recognizing the obvious". The Simon Wiesenthal Center said Trump's announcement "will right an historic wrong". The announcement was also welcomed by the Republican Jewish Coalition.

The Reform Jewish movement called it "ill-timed" and said it would "exacerbate the conflict", but also declared that "Jerusalem is the eternal capital of the Jewish people and the State of Israel" and that they "share the President's belief that the US embassy should, at the right time, be moved from Tel Aviv to Jerusalem". The Jewish Democratic Council of America similarly expressed support for Jerusalem as an undivided capital of Israel, but criticized Trump for neglecting to "meaningfully support peace between Palestinians and Israelis". Left-wing Mideast policy group J Street said the timing was "premature and divisive". J Street, New Israel Fund, and progressive Zionist organization Ameinu expressed concerns that the move would undermine Middle East peace efforts and could lead to violence.

==== Other American groups ====
In December 2017, more than 130 Jewish studies scholars from across North America criticized the Trump administration's decision, calling on the U.S. government to take actions to de-escalate the tensions and "clarify Palestinians' legitimate stake in the future of Jerusalem." According to Haaretz, many of these scholars have been critical of the Trump administration and the current Israeli government.

American Muslim civil advocacy groups rejected the policy change, including the Council on American-Islamic Relations (CAIR) and the Muslim Public Affairs Council (MPAC). On December 5, Muslim, Interfaith and human rights groups held a protest outside the White House.

== Israeli and Palestinian responses ==
=== Israel ===
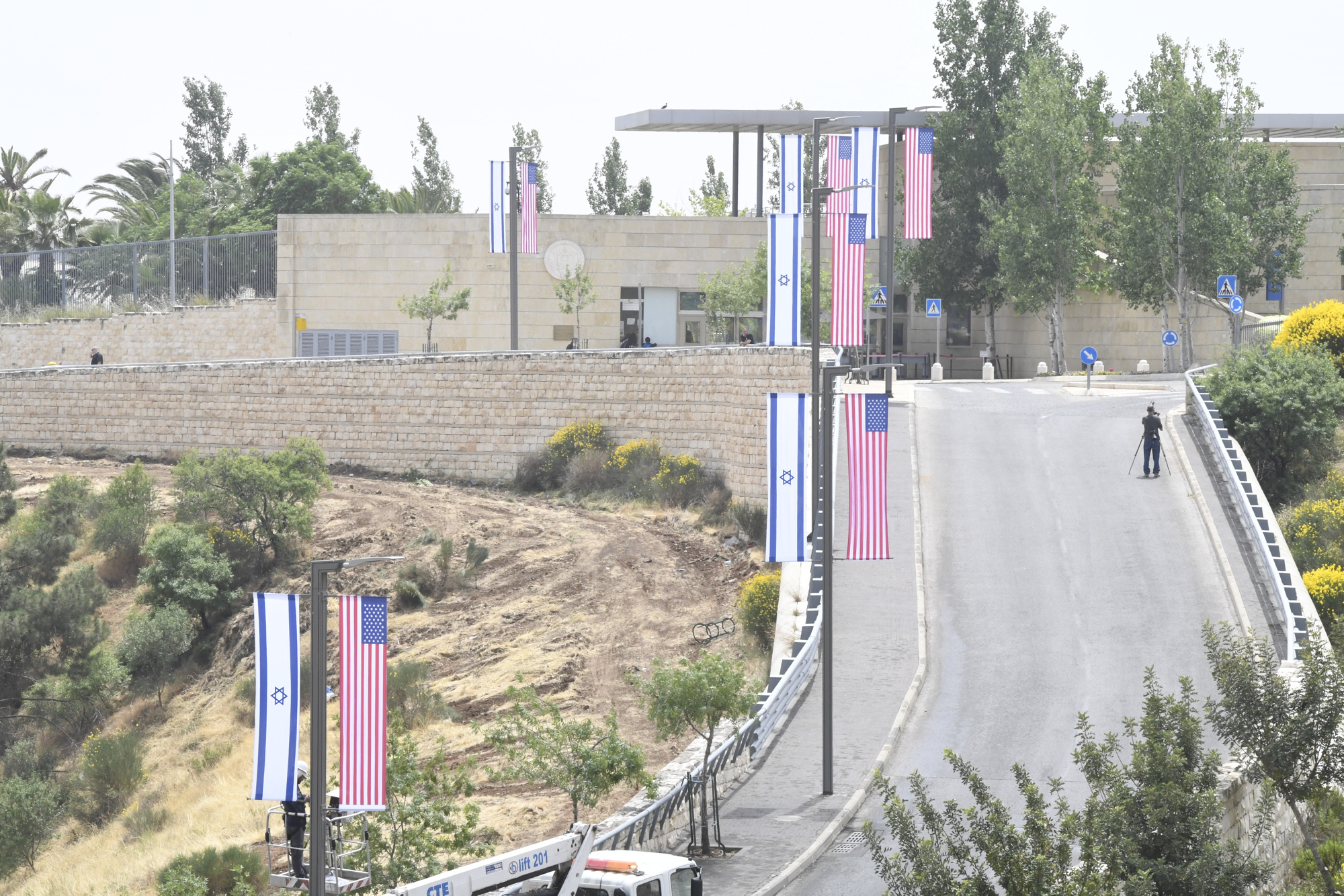
Jerusalem on May 7, 2018

On December 6, shortly after Trump's statement, Israeli Prime Minister Benjamin Netanyahu said the announcement was a "historic landmark" and praised the decision as "courageous and just". During his remarks Netanyahu said there is "no peace that doesn't include Jerusalem as the capital of the State of Israel", adding that Jerusalem has "been the capital of Israel for nearly 70 years". He later said that he has heard condemnation about the announcement but has "not heard any condemnation for the rocket firing against Israel that has come and the awful incitement against us".

The announcement was well received by Knesset members of left, right and center parties including Yesh Atid, Bayit Yehudi, Yisrael Beytenu, and Likud. Isaac Herzog called it an "act of historic justice" but also added that the next step was to "realize the vision of two states". In contrast, Bezalel Smotrich of the religious zionist Bayit Yehudi party issued the following statement: "For 30 years we have fallen into the pit of the Palestinian state as a realistic solution. The time has come to rethink things". Avi Gabbay, the leader the Zionist Union, also supported Trump's announcement, saying that recognition of Jerusalem as Israel's capital is more important than a peace deal.

Israel's Deputy Education Minister Meir Porush of United Torah Judaism party said building in "parts of Judea and Samaria and Jerusalem that need housing would be better than a declaration that means nothing". Yisrael Eichler, also of UTJ, expressed similar views saying he would "rather have 1,000 homes for young couples in Jerusalem than one American embassy building." In contrast, left-wing party Meretz said recognition of Jerusalem should only come with the establishment of a Palestinian state with East Jerusalem as its capital, adding that Trump's declaration "de facto betrays the Zionist vision and the values on which the State of Israel was established".

Hanin Zoabi and Ayman Odeh, both members of the Arab Joint List party, said the US could no longer act as a peace mediator. Odeh said that "Trump is a pyromaniac and will set the entire region ablaze with his madness".

=== Palestinian Authority and Hamas ===
Palestinian officials said the announcement disqualifies the United States from peace talks. Palestinian prime minister Rami Hamdallah said the policy change "destroys the peace process". Palestinian president Mahmoud Abbas gave a speech where he said the decision meant the United States was "abdicating its role as a peace mediator". Palestinian Foreign Minister Riyad al-Maliki similarly said the United States could no longer act as a mediator in the peace process because it had become a party to the dispute. Adnan al-Husayni asked the Organization of Islamic Cooperation to recognize Jerusalem as the capital of Palestine.

Hamas called for a new intifada, but the response from Palestinians inside Jerusalem was relatively muted. The Israel military estimated that 3,000 people in the West Bank and 4,500 in the Gaza Strip participated in protests on December 8, 2017.

The Jerusalem announcement inspired activist Ahmed Abu Artema to write a Facebook proposing the outlines of the Great March of Return protests. Multiple camps of Palestinians engaged in protest along the fenceline of the Gaza Strip as part of this effort in late March 2018, demanding the right of Palestinian refugees and their descendants to return to their former homes in Israel, and an end to the blockade of the Gaza Strip, as well as rejecting recognition of Jerusalem as Israel's capital. The opening of the US embassy in Jerusalem on May 14 coincided with a major escalation of the protests, resulting in the death of 64 protesters on that day.

=== Christian churches based in Jerusalem ===
On December 6, 2017, the primate of the Greek Orthodox Church of Jerusalem, Patriarch Theophilos III, widely regarded as the most senior Christian figure in Jerusalem, and twelve other church leaders in the Holy Land sent a letter to Trump warning that his move “w[ould] yield increased hatred, conflict, violence and suffering in Jerusalem and the Holy Land, moving us farther from the goal of unity and deeper toward destructive division”. Apart from Theophilos III, the letter was signed by heads of Jerusalem's Syrian, Armenian, Ethiopioan and Coptic Orthodox patriarchates as well as the Roman Catholic Church's Apostolic Administrator for Jerusalem (the Latin Patriarchate of Jerusalem). It was also signed by the Franciscan Order, the Greek-Melkite-Catholic patriarchate, the Maronites, the Episcopal Church, the Armenian Catholic and Syrian Catholic churches and the Evangelical Lutherans.

== International response ==
Trump's Jerusalem decision was widely condemned by world leaders. European US allies that objected include Britain, Germany, Italy and France. Romania, on the other hand, declined to follow the EU position and also indicated it may relocate its embassy to Jerusalem.

Pope Francis also made a plea that all nations remain committed to "respecting the status quo" of the city. China urged caution regarding the potential escalation of tensions in the Middle East.

=== United Nations ===
==== Pre-announcement ====
Shortly before Trump's announcement, in November 2017, the United Nations General Assembly voted on a resolution in Jerusalem 151–6 with 9 abstentions. The resolution stated that "any actions by Israel, the occupying Power, to impose its laws, jurisdiction and administration on the Holy City of Jerusalem were illegal and therefore null and void. It further stressed the need for the parties to refrain from provocative actions, especially in areas of religious and cultural sensitivity, and called for respect for the historic status quo at the holy places of Jerusalem." It was part of six resolutions on Palestine and the Middle East.

==== Security Council ====
The United Nations Security Council vote on 7 December to condemn Trump's decision failed due to a veto by the United States, despite the support of the remaining fourteen members of the council. The emergency meeting was requested by Bolivia, Britain, Egypt, France, Italy, Senegal, Sweden and Uruguay. US envoy Nikki Haley called the United Nations "one of the world's foremost centers of hostility towards Israel". Britain, France, Sweden, Italy and Japan were among the countries who criticized Trump's decision at the emergency meeting. On 18 December, a Security Council resolution calling for the withdrawal of the recognition was vetoed by the United States, for a tally of 14–1.

==== General Assembly ====
On 21 December 2017, the General Assembly voted for Resolution ES-10/L.22 by 128–9, with 35 abstentions and 21 absences, to condemn the US declaration on the status of Jerusalem as Israel's capital and enjoin other states to refrain from setting up diplomatic offices in Jerusalem. None of the United States' NATO allies opposed the resolution, with 25 of 29 voting for it.

=== Europe ===
==== European Union ====
The European Union's foreign policy chief Federica Mogherini emphasized that all governments of EU member states were united on the issue of Jerusalem, and reaffirmed their commitment to a Palestinian State with East Jerusalem as its capital. Mogherini said that embassies should not be moved to Jerusalem while the final status of the city was disputed. She also noted that Israeli annexation of East Jerusalem was considered a violation of international law under a 1980 United Nations Security Council resolution. On December 11, Mogherini said that European nations would not move their embassies to Jerusalem.

The EU countries of Austria, Romania, Hungary and the Czech Republic however defied the official EU stance and attended the official reception on the opening of the US embassy in Jerusalem. In addition, the non-EU European countries of Albania, Macedonia, Serbia and Ukraine also attended the opening.

==== European political parties ====
Trump's recognition of Jerusalem did receive some European support from anti-Islam politicians. Czech President Miloš Zeman said the European response was "cowardly". Geert Wilders, leader of the Dutch anti-Islam party Party for Freedom, said that "all freedom loving countries should move their embassy to Jerusalem" and affirmed his support for an undivided Jerusalem. Heinz-Christian Strache, leader of the Austrian Freedom Party, similarly stated his wish to relocate the Austrian embassy to Jerusalem.

=== Arab and Muslim world ===
King Salman of Saudi Arabia said that moving the American embassy to Jerusalem would be a "flagrant provocation" to Muslims. Saudi Arabia and Egyptian President Abdel Fattah el-Sisi both expressed similar concerns about the viability of the peace process. The Jordanian government said Trump had violated international law and the UN charter. Turkish president Recep Tayyip Erdoğan called Israel a "terrorist state".

On December 10, The Arab League held an emergency meeting in Cairo. After the meeting, the League's Secretary-General, Ahmed Aboul Gheit issued a statement saying the change in US policy was "against international law and "amounts to the legalization" of Israeli occupation. Gheit also questioned US commitment to the peace process.

Iran said the U.S. announcement was in violation of international resolutions and could spark a "new intifada". Lebanese President Michel Aoun said the policy change would derail the peace process. Qatar's Foreign Minister Mohammed Abdulrahman Al Thani called it "a death sentence for all who seek peace". Indonesian President Joko Widodo condemned the decision and asked the US to "reconsider the decision". Malaysian PM Najib Razak similarly did so, stating that "we strongly oppose any recognition of Jerusalem as Israel's capital for all time".

On December 13, 2017, during an Organization of Islamic Cooperation (OIC) meeting held in Istanbul, more than 50 Muslim majority countries rejected and condemned Trump's decision by passing the Istanbul Declaration on Freedom for al Quds ("Jerusalem" in Arabic) and calling for the worldwide recognition of "an independent Palestinian state with East Jerusalem as its occupied capital". Palestinian President Mahmoud Abbas stated at the summit that the United States is no longer fit to participate in the Middle East peace process because of its bias and cannot be accepted as a "fair negotiator". While the summit did not produce any concrete sanctions against Israel or the United States, The New York Times called the declaration "the strongest response yet" to Trump's decision. The Organization of Islamic Cooperation (OIC) urges its members to join in the Arab League boycott of Israel.

Pope Tawadros II of the Coptic Orthodox Church of Alexandria canceled a meeting with U.S. Vice President Mike Pence in protest of the American decision. The Coptic Church issued a statement that Trump's decision "did not take into account the feelings of millions of Arab people".

==== Jihadist movements ====
Jihadist movements from around the world responded with calls for armed struggle: Al-Qaeda in North Africa issued a statement exhorting all fighters to make the liberation of Palestine their central goal. Kashmiri group Ansar Ghazwat-ul-Hind called on Muslims worldwide to attack embassies of the US and Israel as well as harm the financial interests of both countries. The Egyptian Hasm Movement called for an uprising. Al-Qaeda in the Arabian Peninsula called on Muslims to support Palestinians with money and weaponry. The Taliban in Afghanistan called the US move "anti-Muslim bigotry". Somalia-based Al-Shabaab exhorted Muslims to respond with weapons.

The Taliban and Shia extremist leaders likewise expressed their opposition. ISIL issued a response on December 8, which mainly focused on criticizing other jihadist groups and Arab leaders. They accused rival groups of politicizing the conflict to serve personal agendas and argued for the defeat of Israel's Arab neighbors who, according to ISIL, "surround [Israel] the same way a bracelet surrounds the wrist, protecting the Jews from the strikes of the mujahideen."

=== China ===
China has historically supported an independent Palestinian state with East Jerusalem as its capital, and said that this position remains unchanged in the aftermath of Trump's announcement. Following the announcement, Chinese state media aired lengthy broadcasts emphasizing Palestinian opposition to it and lack of support for the move among America's European allies. Chinese news reports also stressed the risk of "instability and uncertainty" in the Middle East. Some analysts have argued that moving the embassy could push Israel to make concessions to the Palestinians in final status negotiations. The Chinese embassy issued an alert to travelers regarding the increasingly complicated and intense safety conditions in Israel after the announcement.

=== Other ===
After Trump's announcement, Wikipedia followed suit in listing Jerusalem as Israel's capital, and the event was listed on its "In the News" section. The change sparked a debate between editors. As of December 2017, the English and Hebrew Wikipedias said that Jerusalem was Israel's capital, while the Arabic article on Jerusalem said that Israel claimed it as its capital, but it was located in occupied Palestine.

Following the announcement, right-wing Zionist organization World Betar called for international recognition of the Temple Mount, Nablus and Hebron.

On December 24, Guatemalan President Jimmy Morales said that his country would relocate its embassy to Jerusalem. The Guatemalan embassy was moved on May 16, two days after the American embassy was moved. President of Bolivia Evo Morales was critical of the US decision and accused Guatemala of mocking the international community and ignoring UN resolutions by moving its embassy to Jerusalem. He also claimed that "some governments sell their dignity to the empire" for not losing the crumbs of USAID.

Several national governments responded directly to the opening of the United States Embassy in Jerusalem on May 14, 2018. Japan and Malaysia were among those expressing concern that the relocation could escalate tensions, while Russia and Venezuela added that the move contradicted existing international agreements.

On December 15, 2018, Australia recognized West Jerusalem as the capital of Israel, before withdrawing it again on 17 October 2022.

== Demonstrations and violence ==
=== Israel and Palestine ===
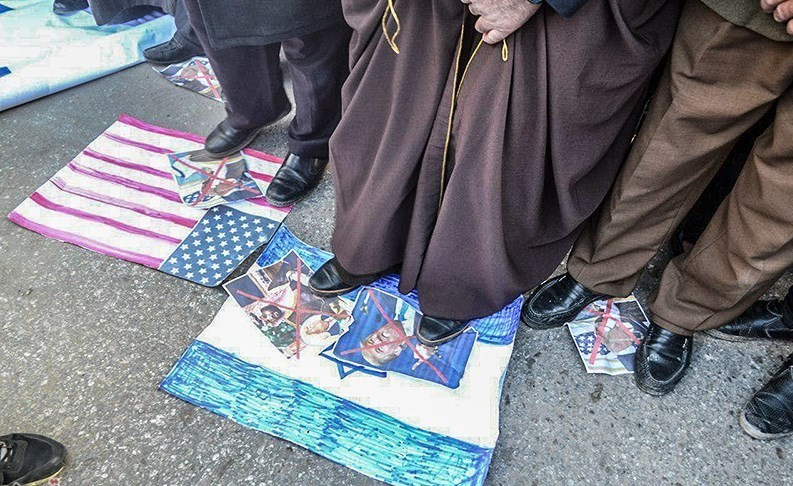
Protest in Gaza, 9 December 2017

In Bethlehem, religious leaders turned off Christmas tree lights outside the Church of the Nativity for three days to protest Trump's announcement. Nazareth scaled back Christmas celebrations, canceling singing and dancing performances in protest.

There were demonstrations throughout the West Bank and Gaza Strip. As of 18 December 2017 nine Palestinians had been killed in clashes. Two protesters were shot dead when participating in a riot on the Gaza border fence on December 8. A 14-year old Palestinian boy suffered serious injuries after being hit by a rubber bullet during a protest.

Two Hamas members were killed in Israeli airstrikes on December 9 on Hamas facilities in response to a rocket attack from Gaza. The Gaza Health Ministry reported that 15 people had been injured in a strike that hit a military facility.

An Israeli security guard was stabbed and critically wounded by a Palestinian near Jerusalem's central bus station on December 10. On December 11, the Israel Defense Forces reported that two rockets were fired into Israel from the Gaza Strip. On December 12, two Islamic Jihad Movement in Palestine militants were killed in an explosion initially claimed to be a drone strike, however the IDF denied this and a later Islamic Jihad statement claimed this was an accident.

Israeli Air Force targeted three Hamas facilities on early morning of December 14 in response to rockets fired from Gaza hours earlier on the previous day with one landing in an open field of Eshkol Regional Council, two shot down and one falling inside a school in Gaza's Beit Hanoun, damaging a classroom. According to a Palestinian security official, the Hamas sites struck by Israeli military suffered major damage and some nearby homes suffered light damage, amidst reports of light injuries.

On December 14, after Israel shut its border crossing with Gaza, tens of thousands of Palestinians and militants attended a Hamas rally in Gaza. The IDF said the Kerem Shalom crossing and Erez checkpoint would be closed indefinitely "in accordance with security assessments".

Four Palestinians were killed on December 15 during violent clashes according to Palestinian Health Ministry, including a disabled protestor in Gaza, and two others in the West Bank, including an attacker who stabbed an Israeli border police officer. Nearly 400 were injured in clashes according to the ministry.

Two Palestinians were killed and 120 injured in clashes on December 22, according to Palestinian Health Ministry. The IDF issued a statement which said that 2,000 protesters had faced off with the troops at the Gaza border fence, hurling rocks as well as burning tires at the troops.

Palestinian rocket fire from Gaza in December 2017 was the most intensive series of rocket attacks on Israel since Operation Protective Edge. As of January 1, 2018, Palestinian militants from Gaza had fired at least 18 rockets at Israel. Per Israeli Prime Minister Netanyahu, IDF has struck 40 Hamas targets in response. Per IDF's Chief-of-Staff Gadi Eizenkot, 20 rockets had been fired in December 2017.

Most of the rockets fired from Gaza did not land in Israeli territory, but some have landed near residential areas like Sderot and Ashkelon. Israel launched air raids on Hamas's military targets in Gaza in response and, according to Haaretz, Hamas responded by arresting and probably torturing Salafi militants in the Gaza Strip to prevent further rocket fire.

Two Palestinians were killed on January 11 in clashes with Israel troops, one each in Gaza and West Bank. Israeli military said rioters had put their forces in danger in Gaza. In the other cases, it said troops fired at the main instigator after being attacked with rocks, though PA official Ghassan Daghlas however claimed it to be an unprovoked attack. This took the death toll to 16 Palestinians and one Israeli since Trump's declaration.

=== Muslim world ===
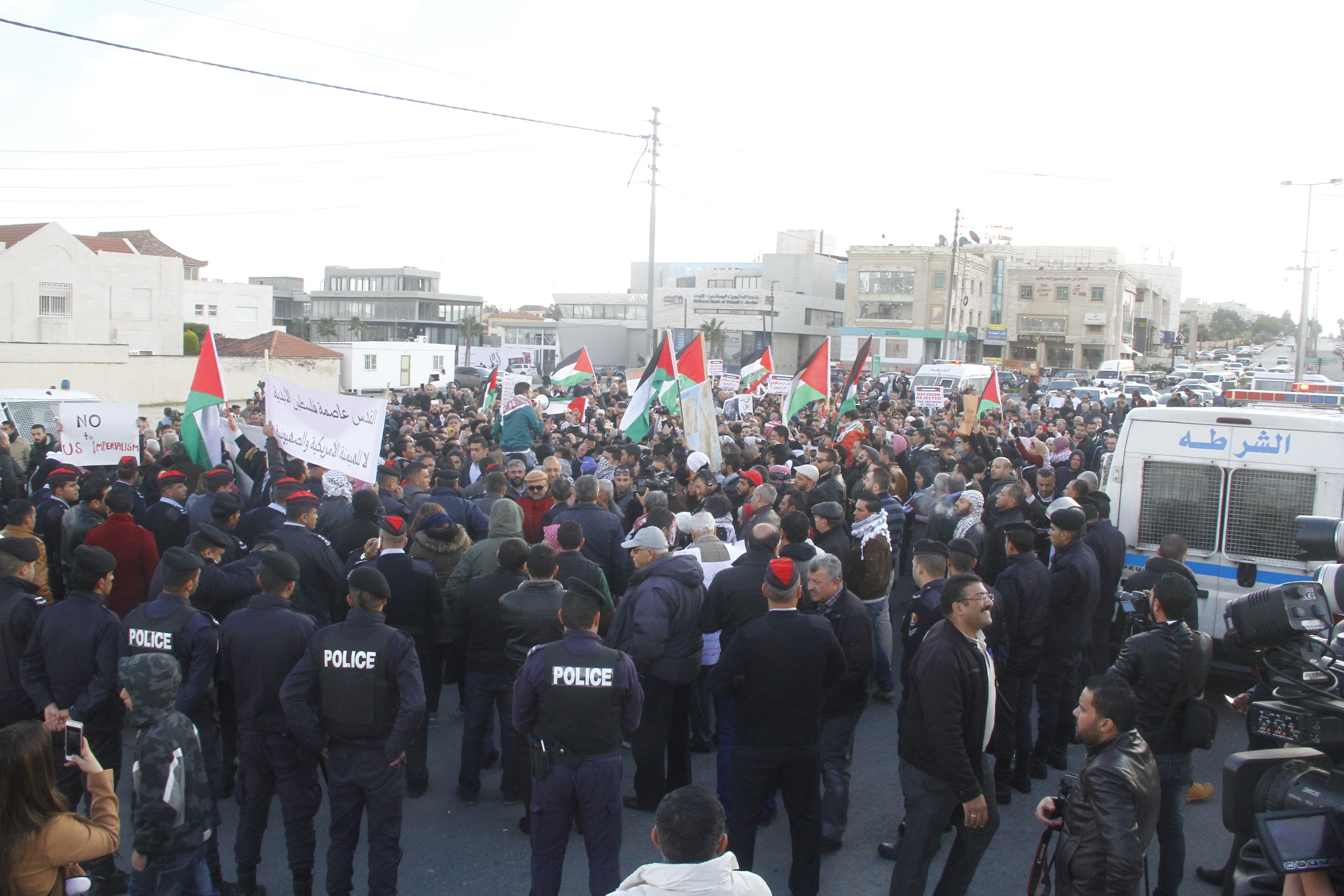
Sit-in in front of the US embassy in Amman, Jordan on 7 December 2017

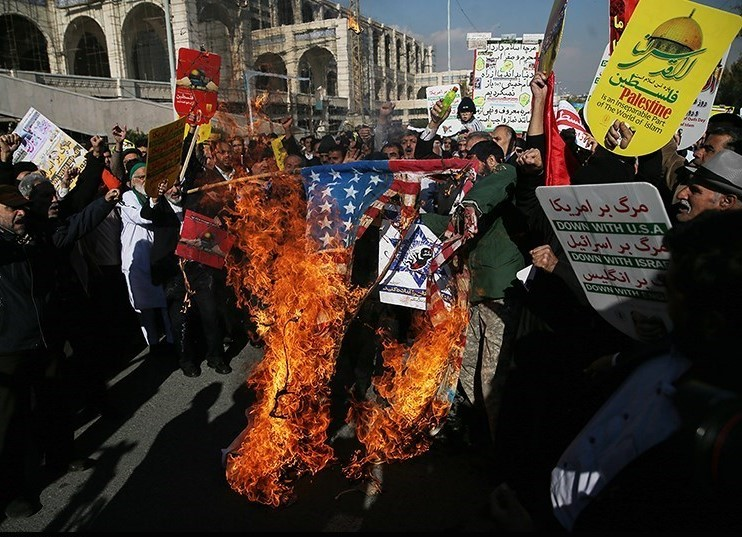
Protest in Tehran, Iran, 13 December 2017

Following the announcement there were demonstrations in Iran, Jordan, Tunisia, Somalia, Yemen, Malaysia and Indonesia. Demonstrations and clashes continued on December 10. Demonstrators hurling rocks and bottles clashed with Lebanese security forces using tear gas and water cannons outside the American embassy near the Lebanese capital Beirut.

Hundreds demonstrated outside US embassy in Amman, demanding its closure and the expulsion of the US charge d'affaires from Jordan. Thousands demonstrated outside the American embassy in Indonesia's capital, Jakarta. On December 10, tens of thousands protested in the Moroccan capital of Rabat.

On December 11, Hassan Nasrallah, the leader of Lebanese Hezbollah, said the organization would once again focus on Israel and the Palestinian cause. He urged Arab states to abandon the peace process and called for a new Palestinian uprising. The same day, thousands of Hezbollah supporters demonstrated in Beirut, chanting "Death to America! Death to Israel!" while waving Palestinian and Hezbollah flags.

Thousands of Hezbollah supporters in a Beirut rally demonstrated and chanted "Death to America!" and "Death to Israel!" A few hundred Iranian conservatives rallied against the US decision in Tehran, playing music with addition of lyrics like "the US is a murderer", "Palestinian mothers are losing their children" and "Death to America".

An estimated 80,000 demonstrated against the decision in Jakarta on December 17, the 10th day of uninterrupted protests in Indonesia. Muslim clerics called for a boycott of American products. Anwar Abbas, a leading Muslim cleric of Indonesian Council of Ulema, read the petition calling for the boycott.

On December 27, the Iranian government became the first Muslim nation that passed a bill recognizing Jerusalem as capital of Palestine.

=== United States ===
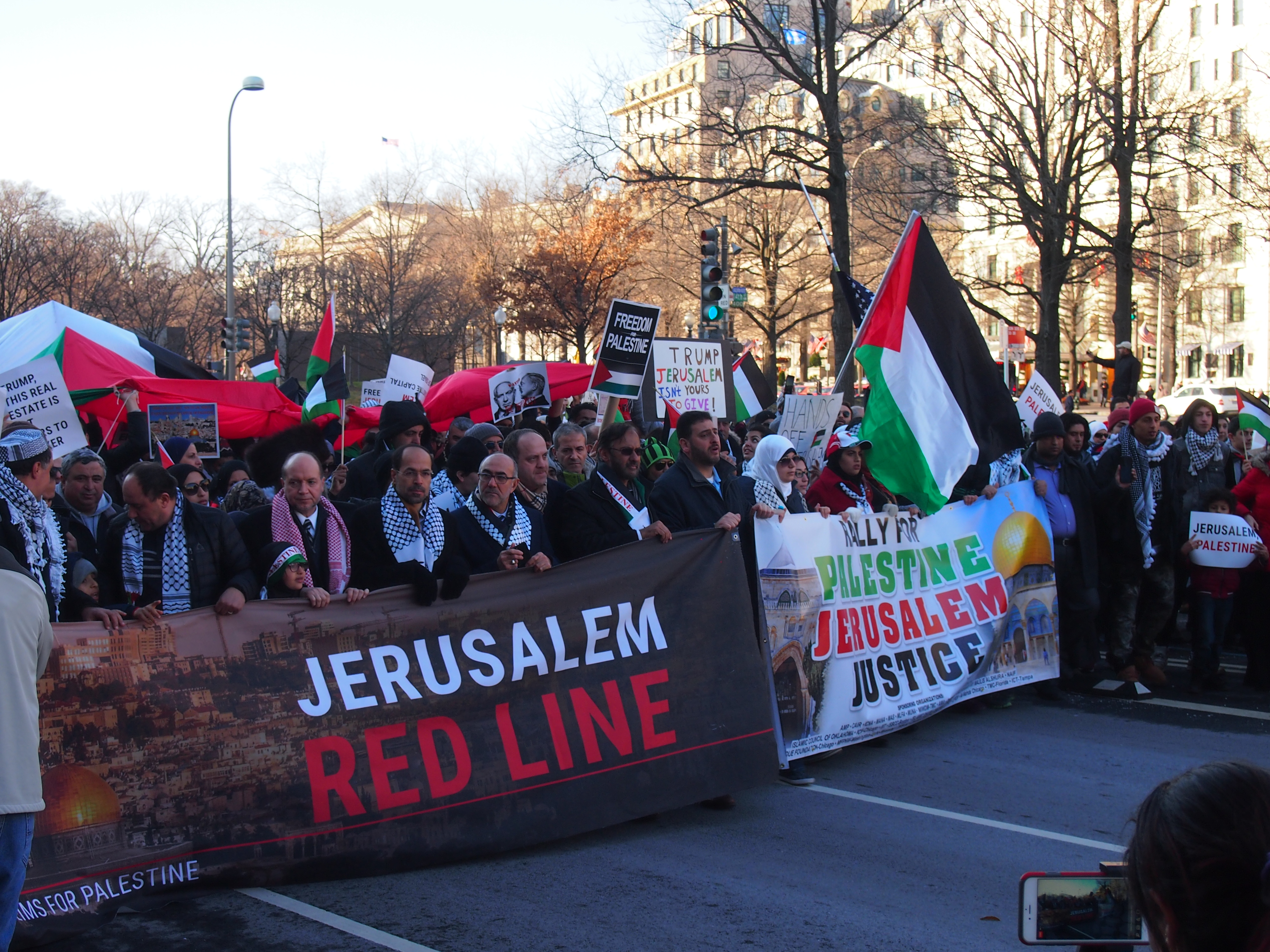
Demonstration in Washington, D.C., United States, 16 December 2017

Hundreds of Muslims attended the Friday prayers outside the White House, in response to calls by American Muslim organizations. They wore Palestinian keffiyeh or colors of Palestinian flag, with protesters holding placards denouncing Israeli presence in East Jerusalem and West Bank.

Protests were held against the decision in Times Square, by hundreds of pro-Palestinian protesters who gathered on the sidewalk of the Seventh Avenue. Some pro-Israeli counter-protestors also gathered nearby. Some pushing and shoving was reported as the two sides faced off at various points. One person was detained by the police.

A former Marine who had been interacting with Facebook posts praising ISIL, was arrested over an ISIL-inspired terror plot on San Francisco's Pier 39 for Christmas. He had cited Trump's decision as one of the reasons behind the plot.

=== Europe ===
Protesters gathered outside the US embassy in The Hague on December 8 and chanted anti-Israeli and pro-Palestinian slogans. The protesters issued a joint press statement calling Trump's decision "against political, diplomatic and moral values". They further claimed that it was no surprise that Trump who was "known for his Islamophobia, xenophobia, racist and populist discourse and marginalization" made such a decision.

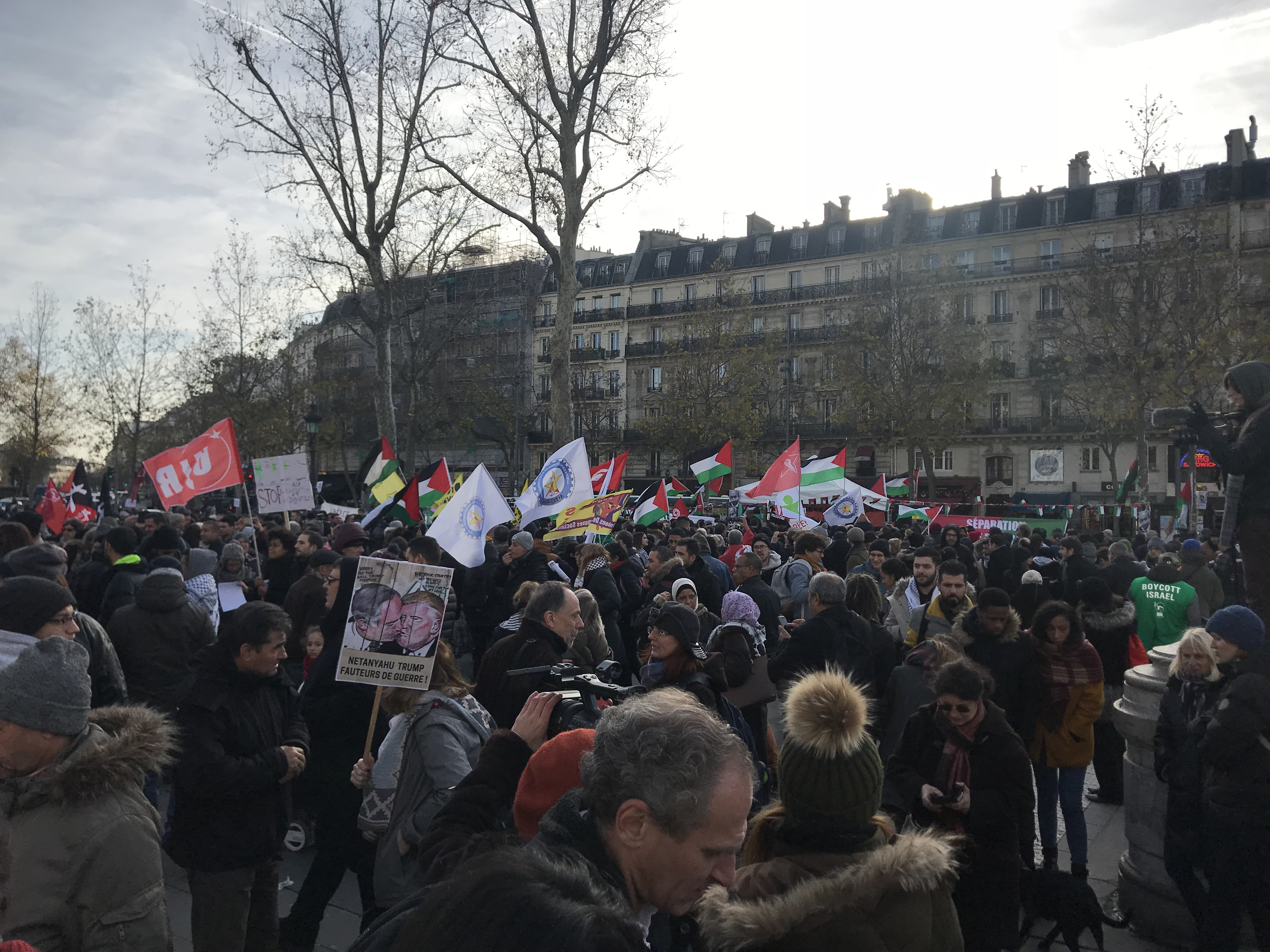
Protest in Paris, France, 9 December 2017

More than a thousand anti-Israel and anti-American protesters protested outside the Brandenburg Gate in Berlin, near the US Embassy. On December 10, around 2,500 demonstrators marched through Berlin's Neukölln district and burned flags with the Star of David. Eleven people were detained and cited for criminal offenses. The burning of Israeli symbols was condemned by German leaders.

Thousands protested outside the US Embassy in London on the same day, with organizers claiming that there were 3,000 protesters and shouting pro-Palestine slogans. Protests were also held in cities of Manchester, Bristol, Birmingham, Nottingham, Dublin, Belfast and Derry.

During a protest in Stockholm on December 8, an Israeli flag was set on fire. During a protest march in Malmö, Sveriges Radio reported that the demonstrators had shouted "We have announced the intifada from Malmö. We want our freedom back, and we will shoot the Jews."

On December 9, a dozen men hurled Molotov cocktails at the Gothenburg Synagogue. No injuries were reported, and those inside the building hid in the basement. The incident followed a pro-Palestinian protest. Three people were later arrested over the attack. Prime Minister Stefan Löfven and other top politicians condemned the attack. On December 11, a chapel of a Jewish cemetery in Malmö was the target of an attempted arson attack. Anti-Semitic chants including "Death to Israel" and "Slaughter the Jews" were also heard during protests in Berlin, Gothenburg and Vienna.

=== Other nations ===
Two Danish journalists of the National Geographic channel were injured in Libreville on 16 December by an Islamist carrying a knife and crying "Allahu Akbar", according to Gabon's Defense Minister Etienne Kabinda Makaga. The attacker, who was arrested, told the police that he was carrying out a revenge attack against the United States over the recognition of Jerusalem as Israel's capital.

On 22 December, the Sri Lanka Palestine Parliamentary Friendship Association (SLPPFA) held a massive rally led by Sri Lankan Minister of Health Rajitha Senaratne in support of Palestine during the issue.

== Relocation of the embassy to Jerusalem ==
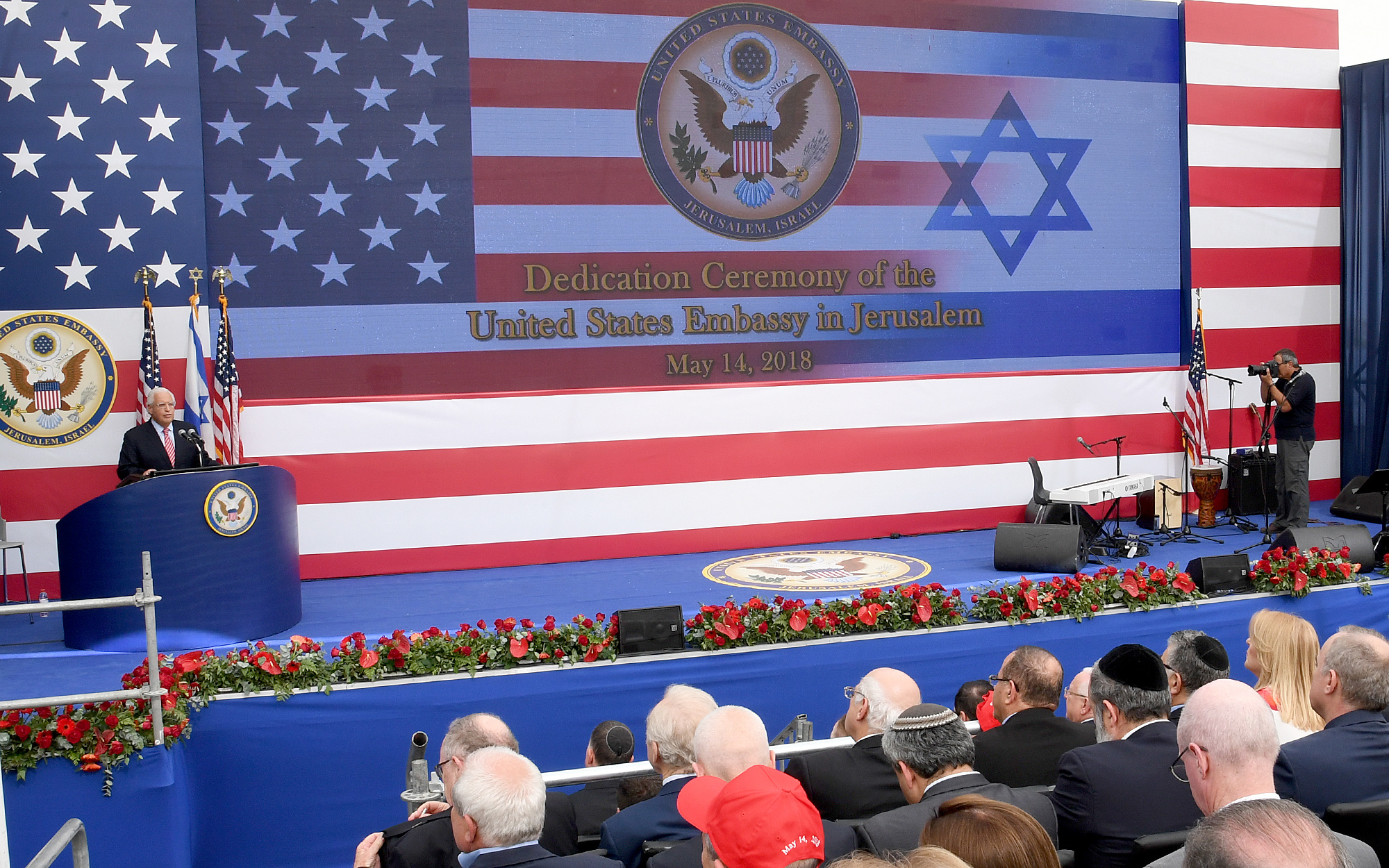
Dedication ceremony in Jerusalem, Israel, 14 May 2018

In February 2018, the U.S. government made it known that it would open its embassy in the building of the U.S. consulate's compound in Jerusalem's southern neighborhood of Arnona in May that year, thereby bringing president Donald Trump's plan to do so forward by about a year. The move was scheduled to coincide with the 70th anniversary of the establishment of the State of Israel.

The U.S. delegation attending the embassy dedication ceremony on 14 May 2018 included the Trump administration's officials Steven Mnuchin, Ivanka Trump, and Jared Kushner as well as Robert Jeffress and John Hagee.

Congressmen from both parties praised the move; Democratic Senate Minority Leader Chuck Schumer said the move was "long overdue". Republican Senators Lindsey Graham and Ted Cruz traveled to Jerusalem to attend the U.S. Embassy opening. The relocation happened during an escalation of the Gaza border protests and caused international condemnation.

Between 1844 and 2019, the United States also maintained a separate consulate general that was later accredited to Palestinian residents in Jerusalem, the West Bank, and Gaza Strip. In mid-October 2018, the United States Secretary of State Mike Pompeo announced that the consulate general would be merged into the new US Embassy in Jerusalem. On March 4, 2019, the consulate general was formally merged into the embassy; ending the US practice of assigning separate diplomatic missions to Israel and the Palestinians. The Consulate-General's former Agron Street site will be revamped as the Embassy's Palestinian Affairs Unit, which will assume many of its former responsibilities but will now report to the US Embassy. Hitherto, the former consulate-general had reported directly to the United States Department of State.

In February 2026, the United States announced that it would begin offering passport and other consular services at a location in an Israeli settlement in the West Bank for the first time. According to Reuters, the move represented a departure from previous practice, under which such services were not provided within settlements. The announcement came amid longstanding international debate over the legal status of Israeli settlements, which most countries and international bodies consider illegal under international law, a position Israel disputes. The U.S. State Department said the decision was intended to improve services for American citizens residing in the area.

== See also ==
- International recognition of Israel
- Israel–United States relations
- Positions on Jerusalem
- United States recognition of the Golan Heights as part of Israel
