= Cserdi =

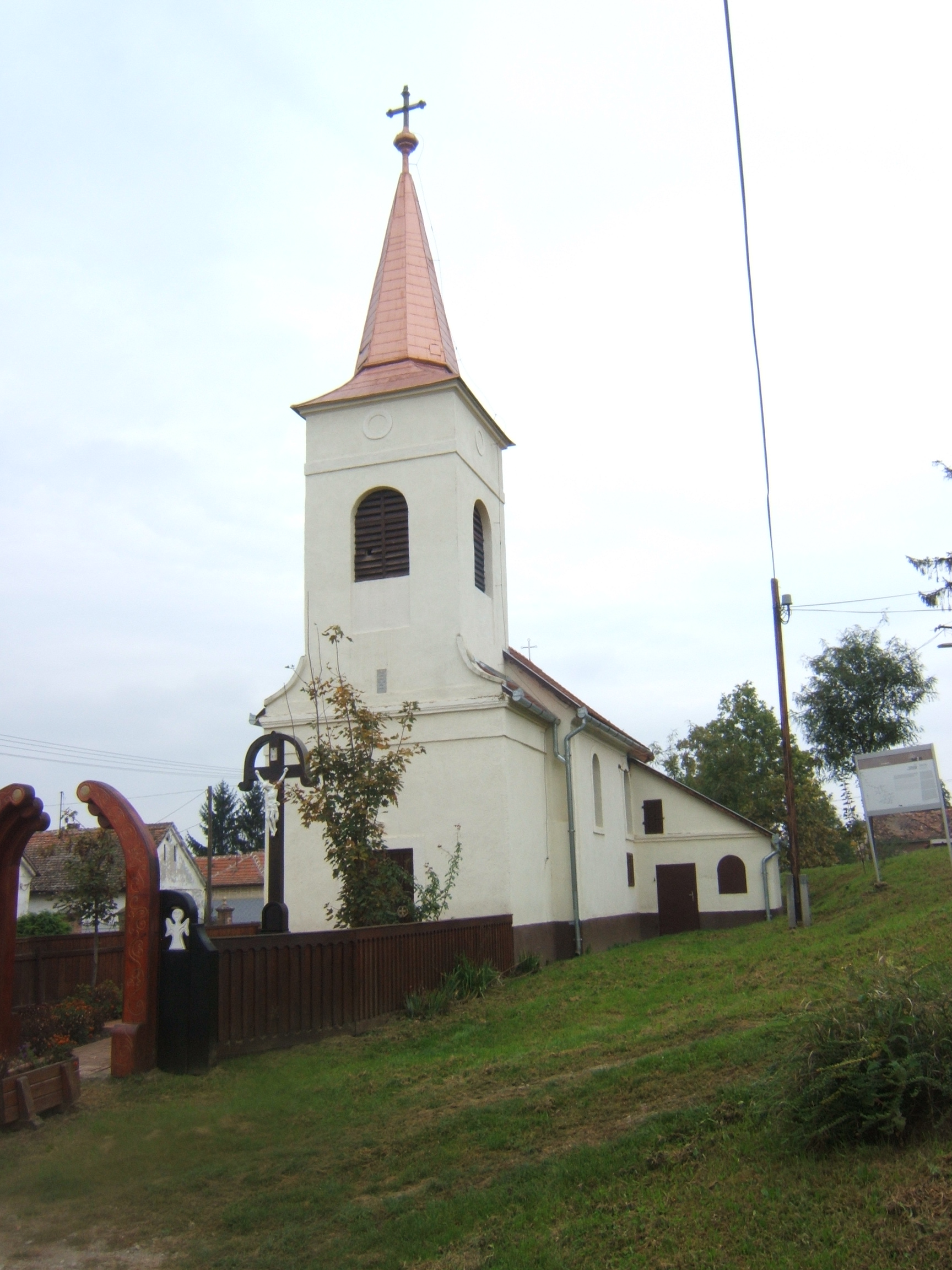

- Flag Seal

- Location of Baranya county in Hungary

- Location of Cserdi
- Coordinates: 46°04′51″N 17°59′26″E
- Country: Hungary
- County: Baranya
- District: Szentlőrinc

Area
  - Total: 6.46 km^{2} (2.49 sq mi)

Population (2004)
  - Total: 352
  - Density: 54.48/km^{2} (141.1/sq mi)
- Time zone: UTC+1 (CET)
  - Summer (DST): UTC+2 (CEST)
- Postal code: 7683
- Area code: 73

Cserdi (Croatian: Čerda) is a village in Baranya county, Hungary. The town, with a population of around 350, is majority Roma. From 2006 to 2019 László Bogdán spearheaded a project that revitalized the town and its economy, becoming known as the "Cserdi miracle" and drawing international attention. The town is also the site of a geological formation.

== "Cserdi miracle" ==
In the early 21st century, the town was in general disorder and had a very high crime rate that was estimated among the highest in Hungary—estimated to be between 300 and 600 cases a year. László Bogdán was mayor of Cserdi from 2006 to his death in 2020. In its obituary of him, The Economist wrote that he led a transformation of the town to an "orderly" town that could produce more food than it needed. This change was known as the "Cserdi miracle". Bogdán also worked to keep girls in school and provide sexual education to avoid teen pregnancies. In 2013 he established a program known as köcsögmentesités ("asshole elimination") which allowed young people to tour prisons in an attempt to lower crime rates. Bogdán also oversaw the construction of a memorial to Roma murdered in the Holocaust in Hungary and constructed a bridge which connected two portions of the town, the Roma and the Hungarians.

Bogdán's efforts to revitalize the town's economy began by growing potatoes. The crop was sold in Pécs and extras were donated to poor people around the region. This program raised the profile of Cserdi around the nation, including in Budapest. It became highly profitable for the town, and Bogdán was able to expand the program to cover 15 hectares (37 acres), and include crops such as tomatoes, peppers, onion, paprika, and garlic. By 2017 the program employed over 80 percent of the village's labour force. Additionally, greenhouses totaling 3,500 square metres (38,000 ft^{2}) were developed as part of the program. The program was producing an average of 65 tons of food that could be sold or donated by 2017.

== Population ==
In 2013 The Budapest Beacon wrote that the town had a population of 411 people. In 2016, The Christian Science Monitor listed it as 426. In 2020 The Economist estimated that the town had a population of around 350. They noted the town was about 3/4 Roma.

== Cserdi formation ==
The Cserdi conglomerate formation is a geological formation dating to the Paleozoic era. The formation has around 1,000 metres (3,300 ft) of rock (including polymictic conglomerate, sandstone and siltstone). The formation has been studied for its composition.
