= Yael Eckstein =

Israeli American philanthropist

- יעל אקשטיין
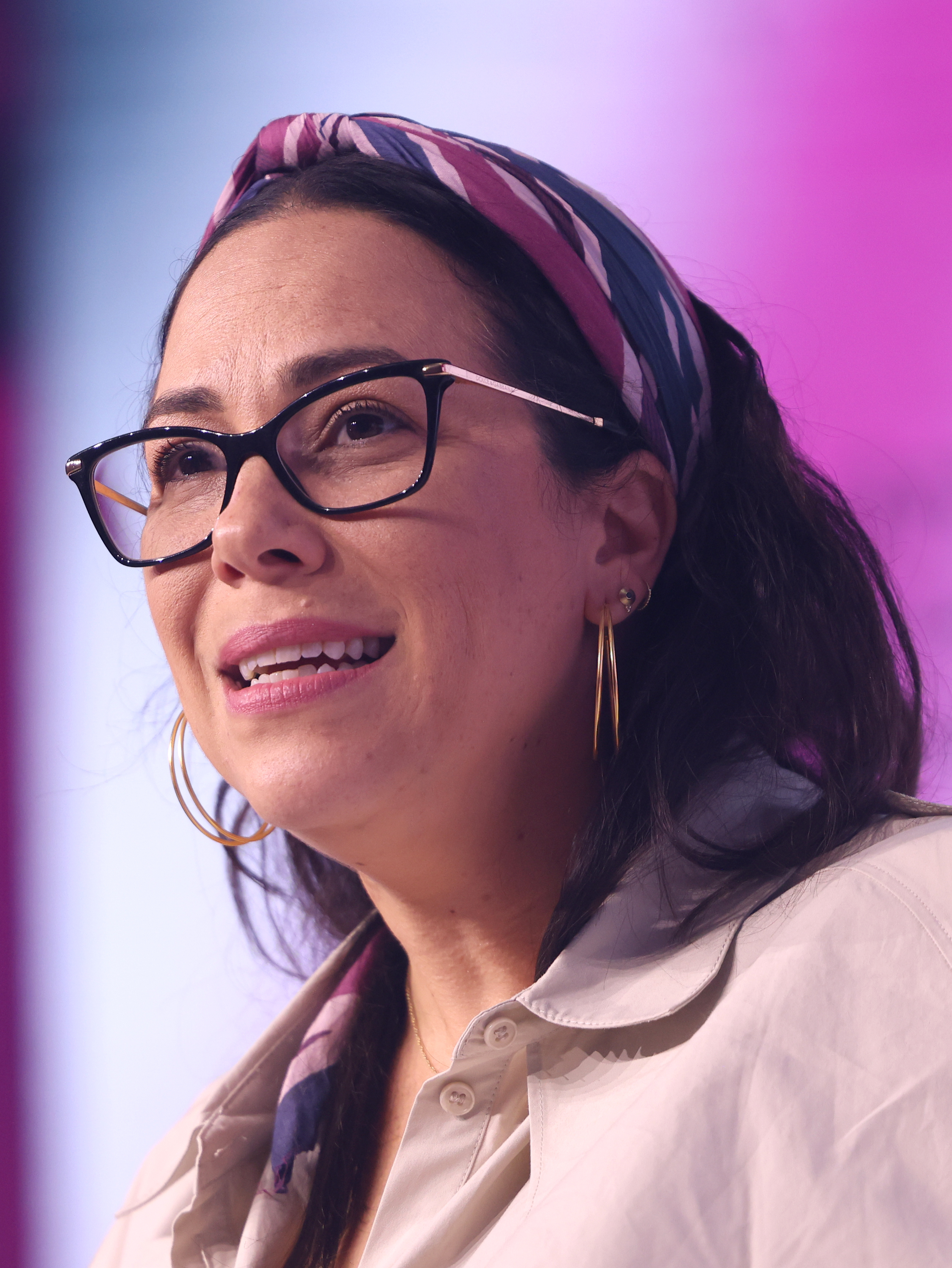
- Eckstein in 2026
- Born: Evanston, Illinois
- Citizenship: United States and Israeli
- Education: Hebrew University
- Known for: President and Global CEO of the International Fellowship of Christians and Jews
- Predecessor: Yechiel Eckstein
- Children: 4
- Parent: Yechiel Eckstein
- Website: www.ifcj.org

Yael Eckstein (Hebrew: יעל אקשטיין) is president and Global CEO of the International Fellowship of Christians and Jews (also referred to as IFCJ or The Fellowship).

== Biography ==
Eckstein is the daughter of Yechiel Eckstein, a rabbi. She was born in Evanston, Illinois, and raised in Chicago.

Eckstein took biblical studies at Torat Chesed Seminary in Israel, Jewish and sociology studies at Queens College in New York, and pursued additional studies at Hebrew University in Jerusalem.

Eckstein made aliyah in 2005 with her husband. She began working at The Fellowship in entry-level positions and advanced through roles including Director of Program Development and Ministry Outreach, Senior Vice President, and Global Executive Vice President. In 2006, she started writing to Fellowship donors about her experiences during the Second Lebanon War.

Eckstein writes op-eds for The Times of Israel and The Jerusalem Post. She has spoken at events on religious persecution in the Middle East in Washington, D.C. Eckstein has appeared on CBN's The 700 Club, launched the podcast Nourish Your Biblical Roots in 2021 (though she no longer hosts it regularly), and launched The Chosen People in 2024. Yael lives in Israel with her husband and four children.

== The Fellowship ==
Eckstein previously held the positions of global executive vice president, senior vice president, and director of program development and ministry outreach.

In 2016, Yechiel Eckstein publicly blessed Yael as the one he envisioned running IFCJ. In 2017, the Fellowship's board – excluding her father, according to Yael – designated her as president-elect.

In 2019, after her father's death at 67, she became president and CEO of The Fellowship, the Chicago-based nonprofit with an office in Israel. She oversees all Fellowship programs as its President and Global CEO and is the organization's international spokesperson.

In 2023, leaked files from the reputation management firm Eliminalia showed that the firm had been engaged to target stories about Eckstein and her father, specifically trying to remove content reporting their combined $4 million annual compensation in 2019, which an IFCJ spokesperson said was due to a death benefit paid out to the elder Eckstein's widow, and that Eliminalia had used what the Washington Post characterized as "bogus copyright complaints" in its attempts to do so.

Under her leadership, The Fellowship has continued humanitarian programs in Israel and other regions. Following the October 7, 2023 attacks, the organization mobilized large-scale emergency response efforts, committing over $300 million in humanitarian and security assistance, installing more than 700 reinforced bomb shelters across Israel (including in mixed and minority communities), and providing food, financial aid, and protective equipment to displaced and war-affected families. Her work has been included in lists of influential figures by The Jerusalem Post and other publications.

== Podcasts ==
- Nourish Your Biblical Roots (launched 2021) — focuses on Jewish-Christian relations and Israel's role in global affairs.
- The Chosen People (launched 2024, in partnership with PRAY.com) — a podcast series on stories from the Hebrew Bible.
- On the Frontlines with Mark Levin — addresses current events and related issues.

== Awards ==
- 2015 — Cover story in Nashim magazine.
- 2019 — Named in The Algemeiner list of 100 people positively influencing Jewish life.
- 2020, 2021, 2023, 2024, 2025 — Included in The Jerusalem Post list of 50 Most Influential Jews.
- 2022 — Included in Future of Jewish list "50 of Our Favorite Jewish Women Right Now".
- 2023 — Received the Humanitarian Award from The Jerusalem Post.
- 2025 — Received the Woman of the Year award from The Jaffa Institute.
- 2025 — Received the Pillars of Jerusalem award.

== Books ==
- Eckstein, Yael (2012). Holy Land Reflections: A Collection of Inspirational Insights from Israel. ISBN 978-0981657738.
- Eckstein, Yael (2014). Spiritual Cooking with Yael: Recipes & Bible Meditations from the Holy Land. ISBN 978-1631855870.
- Eckstein, Yael (2020). Generation to Generation: Passing on a Legacy of Faith to Our Children. ISBN 978-0983532767.
