= International Fellowship of Christians and Jews =

International philanthropic and pro-Israel organization

- Founded: 1983; 43 years ago
- Founder: Yechiel Eckstein (1983–2019)
- Type: 501(c)(3) not-for-profit organization
- Purpose: "To promote understanding and cooperation between Jews and Christians and to build broad support for the State of Israel."
- Location(s): Chicago, Jerusalem, Toronto, and Seoul
- Method: Raising funds among its partners to help Jews in need and Jews living under the threat of anti-Semitism; providing basic necessities to needy families, the elderly and children in Israel; providing basic necessities including food, clothing and shelter to destitute Jews in the former Soviet Union; providing informational and educational materials that help people understand the roots of Judaism
- Key people: Yael Eckstein (President and CEO) (2019–present)
- Website: www.ifcj.org
- Formerly called: Holyland Fellowship of Christians and Jews

The International Fellowship of Christians and Jews (also referred to as IFCJ or The Fellowship) is a pro-Israel philanthropic organization founded in 1983 by Yechiel Eckstein whose stated mission is to promote understanding and cooperation between Jews and Christians, and to provide humanitarian aid to the people of Israel. Since Eckstein's death in 2019, his daughter Yael Eckstein has served as The Fellowship's president and CEO.

== History ==
Yechiel Eckstein, an Orthodox rabbi, began to forge partnerships with evangelical Christians as the national Co-director of Interreligious Affairs for the Anti-Defamation League (ADL) in Chicago. In 1983, he established the Holyland Fellowship of Christians and Jews to promote Jewish-Christian cooperation on projects for improving the safety and security of Jews in Israel and around the world. On September 1, 1991, the organization was renamed the International Fellowship of Christians and Jews.

Per Haaretz, by 2012 the Fellowship collected over $100 million annually in donations for Israel, wherein half of the fund was spent in Israel, supporting soup kitchens, absorption centers, and bomb shelters renovation. At the same period of time, a quarter of the fund's donations were allocated for various Jewish aid programs.

In 2003, Eckstein founded the International Fellowship of Christians and Jews of Canada; in 2006, La Fraternidad Internacional de Cristianos y Judíos; in 2012, the International Fellowship of Christians and Jews of Australia (later discontinued); and, also in 2012, a new Fellowship affiliate in South Korea.

In 2014, Eckstein was awarded the prestigious Raoul Wallenberg Award by the American Jewish Joint Distribution Committee (JDC). The ceremony was attended by the Israeli Prime Minister Benjamin Netanyahu and JDC CEO Alan Gill.

James Rudin, a senior inter-religious adviser for the American Jewish Community, described Eckstein as "well-respected within the American Jewish mainstream. Until he came along, evangelicals and Jews were like ships passing in the night."

Eckstein died on February 6, 2019. His daughter, Yael Eckstein, succeeded him as president of Fellowship.

In 2020, as the COVID-19 pandemic created more needs for individuals and elderly in Israel, The Fellowship allocated $20 million in emergency funding, on top of its regular programming, under the guidance of Yael Eckstein.

In 2022, Yael Eckstein led The Fellowship to establish a $4 million emergency fund for Ukraine. The Fellowship was able to work with partners already on the ground in the former Soviet Union to set up a help hotline and deliver emergency aid to Jewish communities displaced by war. They supplied ongoing basic needs to Ukraine even during the Jewish holiday of Passover. In a 2024 report on Jewish aid efforts in Ukraine, The Jerusalem Post wrote that IFCJ said it had helped nearly 80,000 refugees with essential needs along the Ukrainian border, organized seven humanitarian aid flights to Moldova carrying 95 tons of supplies in 2022, and operated 28 aliyah flights and eight medical flights that year, bringing 5,082 Jews to Israel.

== Organizational structure ==
The organization has headquarters in Chicago and Jerusalem. It is supervised by an independent board of directors, Jewish and Christian. Yael Eckstein serves as The Fellowship's President & CEO. Among the organization's key people are Robin Van Etten (United States CEO & Global Chief Operating Officer), Jackie Gotwalt (executive director of IFCJ Canada), Youngmi Kim (CEO in Korea), and Rev. Johnnie Moore (Chairman of the Board), while Bishop Paul Lanier is listed as Chairman Emeritus.

The organization's main areas of assistance include:

- Holocaust survivors
- IDF soldiers and their families

In May 2010, Isaac Herzog, the Israeli Minister of Welfare and Social Services, presented Eckstein with the government of Israel's first-ever Award for Special Contribution to the Welfare of the People of Israel. The following month, Newsweek named him one of the 50 Most Influential Rabbis in America. Eckstein has received about 50 awards total for his public service work, including the American Jewish Joint Distribution Committee's prestigious Raoul Wallenberg award in 2014.

In 2005, Rabbi Yechiel Eckstein was appointed Goodwill Ambassador of the State of Israel, with special emphasis on Israel's relationships with evangelical communities in Latin America.

=== Charity ratings ===
Charity Navigator gave the organization a four-star rating and a score of 96% as of March 2026. The organization also meets the BBB Wise Giving Alliance's Standards for Charity Accountability.

== Activities and programs ==
The Fellowship's outreach focuses on several major pillars:

- Making Aliyah assists Jews in making aliyah (immigration) to Israel from the former Soviet Union, Ethiopia, Europe, Arab lands, and other countries around the world, and helps them with their klitah (resettlement).
- Providing Security provides basic necessities to needy Israelis by supporting hundreds of projects such as soup kitchens, and by providing food, clothing and basic medical assistance to be distributed while addressing long-term needs like housing, family care, and jobs.
- Alleviating Poverty provides food packages, hot "meals-on-wheels," medicine, in-home care, housing, heating fuel, clothing, and other basic essentials to more than 200,000 destitute elderly Soviet Jews, and gives Jewish orphans and vulnerable street children in the former Soviet Union the care they need to survive and prepare for a brighter future.
- Supporting Fellowship rallies churches, Christian leaders and others to advocate for Israel by praying for it and supporting its right to exist in peace and security. The Fellowship aims to "engage people both spiritually and politically on behalf of Israel and the Jewish people, by encouraging them to "pray for the peace of Jerusalem" and providing them with the facts they need to advocate for the Jewish state and fight anti-Israel bias in the media."

These pillars evolved from earlier IFCJ initiatives, historically known as On Wings of Eagles, Guardians of Israel, Isaiah 58, and Stand for Israel.

Overall, the Fellowship supports over 450 programs across Israel with 5000 volunteers involved. According to The Christian Post, "The Fellowship ... has placed nearly 3,000 bomb shelters in Israel to date." Since the October 7, 2023 Hamas attacks, The Fellowship has significantly expanded its emergency response operations in Israel. Under Yael Eckstein's leadership, the organization committed approximately $300 million in humanitarian and security assistance, including the installation of over 700 reinforced bomb shelters across Israel in coordination with the Home Front Command – about half deployed after October 2023, with placements in mixed cities and minority communities. Emergency aid initiatives included distributing food purchase cards to displaced families, funding a 45 million shekel (~$12 million) Passover relief program supporting approximately 200,000 Israelis, and facilitating emergency Aliyah operations during active missile attacks. These efforts built upon the organization's existing programs while addressing urgent wartime needs for civilians, reservists, and vulnerable populations.

== Finances ==
The Fellowship is recognized as a 501(c)(3) not-for-profit organization by the U.S. Internal Revenue Service and submits to examination by the Better Business Bureau's Wise Giving Alliance. The organization shows full compliance with the BBB's Standards for Charitable Accountability. In 2004, The Fellowship was one of the first not-for-profits entitled to display the BBB Charity Seal, showing full compliance with their Standards for Charitable Accountability.

In 2019, according to their tax returns the ministry declared $118 million in "contributions and grants". According to independent American charity watchdog Charity Navigator, 75.4% of expenses went towards programs and services it delivers, 10.1% on administrative expenses and 14.3% on fundraising expenses.

The organization raises around $130 million per year, largely from evangelical Christian sources, and has raised an estimated total of $1.5 billion since 1983.

According to ProPublica's summary of the organization's Form 990 from 2024, it reported $318 million in revenue and $272 million in total expenses (including program services, administration, and fundraising) that year.

== Controversy ==
In 2009, six months before his death, the Lithuanian-Haredi Jewish leader Rabbi Yosef Shalom Eliashiv issued a ruling banning Haredi Jews from taking funds from the Fellowship, citing worries of Christian missionary activity and idol worship. In response to the ruling, Eckstein said he would "expose his organization's list of Haredi-religious beneficiaries in order "to make sure everything is transparent."

The Fellowship's interfaith work has generated criticism from some in the Jewish community. In 2001, Rabbi Avraham Shapira, an Orthodox Jew and Religious Zionist, issued a ruling against accepting funds from the Fellowship. In 2002 the Edah HaChareidis Haredi Jewish rabbinical court issued a ruling against accepting funds from the Fellowship, and, in 2007, the new Chief Rabbi of the Edah HaChareidis, Yitzchok Tuvia Weiss, added his signature.

In 2023, The Washington Post reported that Eliminalia, a reputation management company had been hired to remove salary and other information from online sources critical of the charity. Eliminalia sent what the Post called "fraudulent copyright-infringement complaints" to WordPress in an attempt to remove posts critical of the $4 million combined compensation paid by IFCJ to Yechiel and Yael Eckstein in 2019, which an IFCJ spokesperson said was due to a death benefit paid out to Rabbi Eckstein's widow.

== See also ==
- American Jewish Committee – U.S. Jewish advocacy group
- Eliminalia - removed critical stories for IFCJ
- International Council of Christians and Jews, an unrelated group also engaged in Christian-Jewish dialogue
- John Paul II Center for Interreligious Dialogue
- National Conference of Christians and Jews (since 1998 called the National Conference for Community and Justice)
- Pontifical Council for Interreligious Dialogue
- Project Interchange – U.S. Jewish advocacy group
- Zionism – Jewish nationalist movement
