= Yechiel Eckstein =

American rabbi and philanthropist (1951–2019)

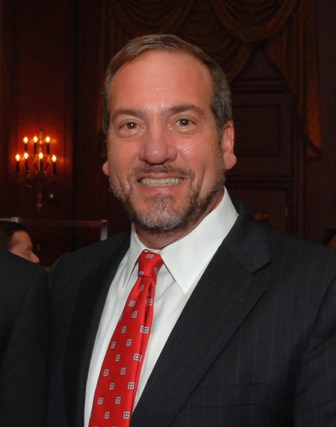
- Eckstein at IFCJ's 25th anniversary in 2008.
- Born: July 11, 1951; Winthrop, Massachusetts, U.S.
- Died: February 6, 2019 (aged 67); Jerusalem, Israel
- Citizenship: Canadian, American and Israeli
- Education: Yeshiva University; Columbia University
- Occupations: Rabbi, Founder and President
- Organization: International Fellowship of Christians and Jews
- Known for: Founder of the International Fellowship of Christians and Jews
- Title: Rabbi
- Spouse(s): Bonnie Siegman (m. 1974–2004); Joelle Eckstein (m. 2007–2019)
- Children: Yael Eckstein; Tamar Eckstein; Talia Eckstein
- Parent(s): Rabbi Dr. Sy Eckstein, Belle Eckstein
- Awards: Raoul Wallenberg Award
- Website: www.rabbieckstein.org

Yechiel Eckstein (Hebrew: יחיאל אקשטיין; July 11, 1951 – February 6, 2019) was an Israeli American rabbi who founded International Fellowship of Christians and Jews in 1983 and led it for many years. The objectives of the organisation were to support Jews in need of financial help, to promote emigration of Jews to Israel, and to support poor soldiers in the Israel Defense Forces. In 2003, it was listed as the second-largest charitable foundation in Israel by Ha'aretz.

In 2010 Newsweek listed him in the Top 50 Most Influential Rabbis in America. He was awarded Hadassah's first Man of Distinction in 2010, and the Raoul Wallenberg Award in 2014. He was listed in the "Jerusalem Post's Top 50 Most Influential Jews" of 2014 and 2015.

== Early life and education ==
Born in Winthrop, Massachusetts, Eckstein was the son of the Rabbi and psychologist Dr. Simon "Sy" Eckstein (1919–2016) and his wife Belle Eckstein (née Hirschman) of Tampa, Florida. In 1952, when he was just a year old, Eckstein moved with his family to Ottawa, Ontario, Canada, as his father accepted a newly created rabbinic post as the Chief Rabbi of Ottawa, where he was raised, as his father oversaw four synagogues, two which eventually merged to form Congregation Beth Shalom. He was a graduate of Yeshiva University High School for Boys.

Eckstein served as a faculty member at Columbia University, the Chicago Theological Seminary and the Northern Baptist Seminary.

== The Fellowship ==
After serving as national co-director of inter-religious affairs for the Anti-Defamation League, Eckstein founded the Holyland Fellowship of Christians and Jews in 1983 to help Christians and Jews work together on projects promoting the safety and security of Jews in Israel and around the world. The organization was renamed the International Fellowship of Christians and Jews in 1991. Its first goal is to provide material aid to needy Jewish families and the elderly, for example, by helping them buy food and medicine. A secondary mission is promoting Jewish emigration to Israel. The third is supporting the Israeli military by aiding poor Israeli soldiers.

When Eckstein started the Fellowship, he had no salary, no medical benefits and a pregnant wife. He worked part-time as a rabbi. In the early years, he received the majority of his donations from fellow Jews. Often these gifts were grudgingly given. "I don't know what you're doing, and I don't know if I like what you're doing," one Jewish philanthropist from Chicago said to him, but he nonetheless donated. But from the mid-1990s, he became popular with Evangelical Christians, leading to growth of the charity each year. In December 2003, the I.F.C.J. was listed as the second-largest charitable foundation in the country by Israeli newspaper Ha'aretz. He was also one of the highest paid nonprofit leaders in the world, receiving a $824,000 salary in 2007.

Eckstein was also known for private donations to the Israeli military, through the US-American lobby group "Friends of the IDF".

In 2023, leaked files from the reputation management firm Eliminalia showed that the firm had been engaged to target stories about Eckstein and his daughter, specifically trying to remove content reporting their combined $4 million annual compensation in 2019, which an IFCJ spokesperson said was due to a death benefit paid out to the elder Eckstein's widow, and that Eliminalia had used what the Washington Post characterized as "bogus copyright complaints" in its attempts to do so.

== Personal life and death ==
Eckstein held dual citizenship in the U.S. and Israel, having become an Israeli citizen in 2002. He had three daughters with his first wife, Bonnie Siegman; the couple subsequently divorced. His daughter Yael Eckstein became president and CEO of the International Fellowship of Christians and Jews after Eckstein's death. Eckstein and his second wife, Joelle (née Medina), lived in Jerusalem.

He recorded six CDs as a Hasidic singer. He was a member of Kol Salonika, The Y'DID Singers and The Rabbis' Sons. In the 1990s Yechiel co-led a band called "Ashira" with Chicago–based band leader Don Cagen.

He died on February 6, 2019, after suffering a cardiac arrest.

Due to Eckstein's associations with the Christian right-wing and evangelical movement, he was controversial in the Jewish community, especially among liberal Jews from the United States and among Orthodox Jews.

== Awards ==
In June 2010 he was listed by Newsweek magazine in the Top 50 Most Influential Rabbis in America. In July 2010, Hadassah awarded him its Man of Distinction award. In 2014, he was awarded the Raoul Wallenberg Award by the JDC. He was also listed in the "Jerusalem Post's Top 50 Most Influential Jews" of 2014 and 2015.
