= David Lyle Mack =

American diplomat

David Lyle Mack (June 10, 1940 – July 15, 2026) was an American diplomat.

He was the former Deputy Assistant Secretary of State for Near Eastern Affairs (1990–1993) and U.S. Ambassador to the United Arab Emirates (1986–1989).

Mack also served as the Principal Officer in Iraq from May 1977 until February 1978.

He was a non-resident Scholar at the Middle East Institute in Washington, D.C., and served as the Senior Vice President.

== Education ==
- B.A. (1962) and M.A. (1964) from Harvard University,
- American University of Cairo as a Fulbright fellow, 1964–1965

Diplomatic posts
Preceded by George Quincey Lumsden, Jr.	U.S. Ambassador to United Arab Emirates; 1986–1989	Succeeded by Edward S. Walker Jr.
