= Luigi Gorini =

Italian microbiologist

Luigi Gorini (November 13, 1903 – August 13, 1976) was a member of the United States National Academy of Sciences and a prominent professor in the Harvard Medical School, who had also been prominent in the Italian anti-fascist underground during World War II.

== Early life ==
Dr. Gorini was born in Milan on November 13, 1903. His father was a microbiologist. He earned a degree in organic chemistry from the University of Pavia in 1925 but his studies were interrupted when he refused to sign a required Fascist oath in 1931, and he worked at several small pharmaceutical concerns for the next ten years, until the outbreak of World War II. At the time he was married to his first wife, with whom he had a son, Jan, and a daughter, Isa.

== Wartime activities ==
At the onset of war, Dr. Gorini avoided conscription and fled to Milan, where he adopted a false identity, naming himself after nineteenth century Italian rebel and philosopher Carlo Cattaneo, and worked for the Resistance. While employed at the Instituto Giuliana Ronzoni he met Annamaria Torriani, who worked with him in the laboratory and the Resistance, and became his second wife.

== Selvino children ==
After the war, the couple managed a former Fascist summer camp in Selvino, which they turned into a recuperative rehabilitation center for orphans who had survived concentration camps, restoring the physical and mental health of about a thousand children who were sent to settle in Mandatory Palestine; for this work they were honored by Yad Vashem in 1976.

== Scientific work ==
The couple then resumed their individual scientific careers in Paris, where Luigi's research in microbiology at the Sorbonne earned him the Kronauer Prize from the Faculté des Sciences, in 1949. In 1955, he became a visiting researcher in the laboratory of Bernard Davis at the New York University Department of Pharmacology, and in 1957 he followed Davis to join the faculty of the Harvard Medical School Department of Bacteriology and Immunology, where his work on bacterial metabolism earned him an American Cancer Society Department of Microbiology and Molecular Genetics professorship in 1964, Harvard's George Ledlie Prize in 1965, and membership in the National Academy of Sciences in 1971.

== Personal life ==
In addition to his scientific career, Dr. Gorini continued his advocacy of progressive causes, speaking out against racism and the Vietnam War. In addition to the two children he had with his first wife, Gorini had one son, Daniel, from his second marriage.
