= Frank Lowenstein =

American lawyer

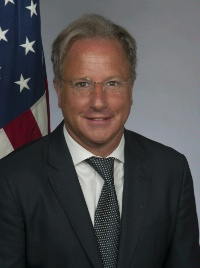

United States Special Envoy for Middle East Peace
- In office June 27, 2014 – January 20, 2017
- President: Barack Obama
- Preceded by: Martin Indyk
- Succeeded by: Position abolished
- In office June 24, 2013 – July 29, 2013
- President: Barack Obama
- Preceded by: David Hale
- Succeeded by: Martin Indyk

Personal details
- Born: Frank Graham Lowenstein; August 16, 1967 (age 59) New York City, New York, U.S.
- Party: Democratic
- Spouse: Peyton M. West (m. 2004)
- Children: 2
- Relatives: Allard K. Lowenstein (father); Jennifer Lyman (mother)
- Education: Yale University (BA); Boston College (JD)

Frank Graham Lowenstein (born August 16, 1967) is an American lawyer, diplomat and former government official.

== Early life and education ==
He was born on August 16, 1967, in New York City, New York. He is the son of former New York congressman Allard K. Lowenstein and Jennifer Lyman. He graduated from Yale University with a Bachelor of Arts degree in 1990 and from Boston College Law School with a Juris Doctor in 1997.

== Legal career ==
From 1997 to 2003 he practiced law in Boston, Massachusetts.

== Political career ==
From 1990 to 1994 he served as a foreign policy and defense legislative assistant in the office of Senator John Kerry. From 2003 to 2009 he served in numerous positions relating to foreign policy and national security while working on the Kerry Edwards Presidential Campaign and for Senator John Kerry. From 2009 to 2011 he served as staff director and chief counsel of the United States Senate Foreign Relations Committee.

=== Lobbying ===
From 2011 to 2013 he served as principal of the Podesta Group.

== Diplomatic career ==
From 2013 to 2014 he served as a senior advisor to the United States Secretary of State. He served as the United States Special Envoy for Middle East Peace from June 2014 until January 2017.

== Post-diplomatic career ==
From December 2017, he has been serving an executive director at APCO Worldwide.

== Personal life ==
He married Peyton McLean West in April 2004. They have two children.
