= László Bogdán =

Mayor of Cserdi, Hungary

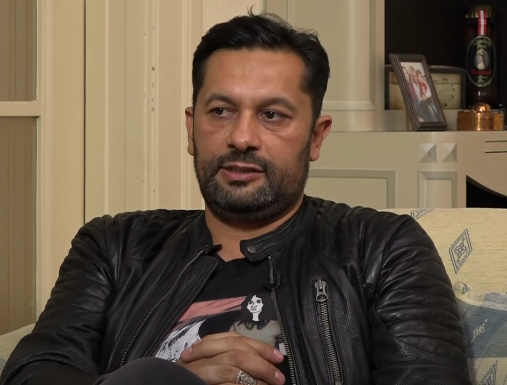

Mayor of Cserdi
- In office 1 October 2006 – 14 July 2020
- Preceded by: Márta Jászberényi
- Succeeded by: Gyula Bogdán

Personal details
- Born: 3 June 1974 Pécs, Hungary
- Died: 14 July 2020 (aged 46) Cserdi, Hungary

László Bogdán (June 3, 1974 – 14 July 2020) was a Hungarian politician who served as the mayor of Cserdi, a village inhabited mainly by Roma people in southern Hungary. He led a revitalization of the village in what became known as the "Cserdi miracle", lowering crime rates, putting most of the labour force to work, and working for a large farming program to be established. Bogdán died by suicide in 2020.

== Early life ==
Bogdán was born in Pécs in 1974, and grew up in Cserdi in southern Hungary. His family was very poor, struggling to get enough food and afford basic goods. He was Roma, a group that has generally been viewed unfavourably in Hungary. Bogdán attended school for three years.

== Career ==
Bogdán became deputy mayor of Cserdi in 2002, and four years later was elected mayor of Cserdi. Inhabited by about 400 people, the village has a majority Roma population. In its obituary of him, The Economist wrote that he led a transformation of the village from one with a high crime rate—estimated among the highest in Hungary—and in general disorder to an "orderly" village that could produce more food than it needed. This change was known as the "Cserdi miracle". Bogdán drew attention for his work on the national and international level, and spoke around the world, including at the United Nations. An article published in Society and Economy profiled Cserdi, specifically Bogdán's work in it, describing it as a "seminal" change.

Some of Bogdán's first actions were to close the village's pub and take protective bars off governmental offices. He also created a summer school program and worked to keep girls in school and provide sexual education to avoid teen pregnancies. Some of his programs offered computers and bicycles as rewards for attending school. In 2013 he established a program known as köcsögmentesítés ("asshole elimination") which allowed young people to tour prisons in an attempt to lower crime rates. The program's name is an offensive reference to the practice of raping of young and weak males in prisons and Bogdán wanted to counterbalance the idea, popular in the local Roma community, that imprisonment was "cool". Bogdán also oversaw the construction of a memorial to Roma people killed in the Holocaust in Hungary and constructed a bridge which connected two portions of the town, the Roma and the Hungarians. Bogdán was not interested in becoming politically active on the national level.

Bogdán's efforts to revitalize the town's economy began by growing potatoes. The crop was sold in Pécs and extras were donated to poor people around the region. This program raised the profile of Cserdi around the nation, including in Budapest. It became highly profitable for the town, and Bogdán was able to expand the program to cover 15 hectares (37 acres), and include crops such as tomatoes, peppers, onion, paprika, and garlic. By 2017 the program employed over 80 percent of the village's labour force. Additionally, greenhouses totaling 3,500 square metres (38,000 ft^{2}) were developed as part of the program. The program was producing an average of 65 tons of food that could be sold or donated by 2017. Society and Economy noted that Bogdán received favorable attention from his work at a time when it was "rare to see a Roma man projected by the mainstream media in such a positive way". That year, he was described as only sleeping a few hours a night and living by himself. He was politically independent. He employed unusual methods, including a form of public punishment to implement his ideas: workers who arrived late were to read a text for their co-workers.

According to the Hungarian Free Press, Bogdán was attacked by a mob of villagers in 2017 after he said he would welcome refugees into Cserdi. The publication wrote later that year that the state-sponsored Hungarian media was attacking him. Bogdán had further plans for revitalizing the village, including "Romburgers" and building a processing plant.

On 14 July 2020, Bogdán died by suicide, hanging himself in the processing plant.

== Recognition ==
Bogdán was a recipient of Hungary's Raoul Wallenberg Award in 2020. In 2013 readers of Bama.hu voted him to be the Mayor of the Year. From 2015 to his death, Bogdán was Hungary’s Talent Ambassador.
