= Daniel C. Kurtzer =

American diplomat (born 1949)

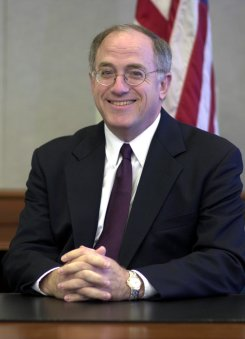

United States Ambassador to Israel
- In office July 12, 2001 – July 17, 2005
- President: George W. Bush
- Preceded by: Martin Indyk
- Succeeded by: Richard Jones

United States Ambassador to Egypt
- In office November 10, 1997 – June 22, 2001
- President: Bill Clinton; George W. Bush
- Preceded by: Edward S. Walker Jr.
- Succeeded by: David Welch

Personal details
- Born: June 1949 (age 77) Elizabeth, New Jersey, U.S.
- Children: Yehuda Kurtzer, David Kurtzer-Ellenbogen, Jacob Kurtzer
- Education: Yeshiva University (BA); Columbia University (PhD)

Daniel Charles Kurtzer (born June 1949) is an American former diplomat. He served as U.S. ambassador to Egypt from 1997 to 2001 and as U.S. ambassador to Israel from 2001 to 2005.

== Biography ==
Daniel Charles Kurtzer was born in Elizabeth, New Jersey to Nathan and Sylvia Kurtzer. He received his PhD from Columbia University, and served as the dean of his alma mater, Yeshiva College.

== Family ==
Daniel Kurtzer is married to Sheila Kurtzer and has three children and eight grandchildren. One of his sons is the American Jewish public intellectual Yehuda Kurtzer.

== Publications ==
Kurtzer is the co-author of Negotiating Arab-Israeli Peace: American Leadership in the Middle East; co-author of The Peace Puzzle: America's Quest for Arab Israeli Peace, 1989–2011; and editor of Pathways to Peace: America and the Arab-Israeli Conflict. He is also a frequent contributor of academic articles and opinion pieces.

== Diplomatic career ==
Kurtzer joined the United States Department of State and was serving as a junior officer at the American Embassy in Cairo when Anwar Sadat was assassinated in 1981. He served in Israel between the years of 1982 and 1986, then became Deputy Director of the State Department's Egypt desk in Washington, D.C. He later served on the Policy Planning Staff, as Deputy Assistant Secretary of State for Near Eastern Affairs, and as Principal Deputy Assistant Secretary of State for Intelligence and Research. When asked why he was drawn to the Middle East, he later replied: "The work never seems to be finished in this region. It is not a place where tuxedos and cocktail parties characterize diplomacy."

Kurtzer joined the staff of Secretary of State James Baker. He helped write Baker's noteworthy speech to American Israel Public Affairs Committee (AIPAC) in May 1989. The speech was originally drafted by Harvey Sicherman, who used uncontroversial pro-Israel language in his text. Kurtzer's revisions included an attention-getting line that encouraged Israel and its supporters to abandon the Greater Israel idea. According to Aaron David Miller, he and Kurtzer wrote short memos for Baker on issues at hand, rather than longer, strategic papers.

Kurtzer was also part of the Clinton administration's team of advisers on the Arab–Israeli peace process. According to Miller, Kurtzer left in 1994 because he "felt shut out by" the Special Middle East Envoy, Dennis Ross.

In 2006, he retired from the State Department and the U.S. Foreign Service with the rank of Career-Minister and assumed a chair in Middle East policy studies at the School of Public and International Affairs at Princeton University. He co-chaired, with Scott Lasensky, the Study Group on Arab-Israeli Peacemaking, a project supported by the United States Institute of Peace. They published their recommendations in a 2008 book.

In 2007, Kurtzer served as the commissioner of the Israel Baseball League, a league discontinued after a single season.

In 2008, he endorsed then-Senator Barack Obama's successful candidacy for the presidency. Kurtzer, James Steinberg, and Dennis Ross were among the principal authors of Obama's address on the Middle East to AIPAC in June 2008, which was viewed as the Democratic nominee's most expansive on international affairs.

== See also ==
- Israel–United States relations

Diplomatic posts
Preceded by Edward S. Walker, Jr.	U.S. Ambassador to Egypt; 1997–2001	Succeeded by C. David Welch
Preceded by Martin Indyk	U.S. Ambassador to Israel; 2001–2005	Succeeded by Richard Jones
Sporting positions
Preceded by Precedent	Israel Baseball League Commissioner; 2007	Succeeded by Incumbent
