= Annamaria Torriani-Gorini =

Italian microbiologist

Annamaria Torriani-Gorini (December 19, 1918 – May 2, 2013) was an Italian microbiologist best known for her work with bacterial alkaline phosphatase and bacterial physiology. Torriani-Gorini earned her Ph.D. in botany at the University of Milan. She worked at the Institut Pasteur in Paris, had a postdoctoral fellowship at the New York University School of Medicine, was a research associate at Harvard University, and became a professor at MIT. Torriani-Gorini advocated for social and economic justice and promoted women in science. She and her husband Luigi Gorini transformed a house in the Italian Alps into a home for Jewish orphans who were liberated from concentration camps.

== Early life and education ==
Torriani-Gorini was born to Ada Forti and Carlo Torriani on December 19, 1918, in Milan, just after her brother had died of the Spanish flu. She was raised in Milan alongside her younger sister. In 1942, Torriani-Gorini graduated from the University of Milan with a Ph.D. in botany.

== Career ==
After earning her PhD at the University of Milan, Torriani-Gorini was a research associate at the Giulio Ronzoni Istituto Chimica e Biochimica in Milan from 1942 to 1948. She then began working at the Institut Pasteur, where from 1950 to 1956 she served on the faculty, working alongside Melvin Cohn and Jacques Monod.

In 1956, Torriani-Gorini won a Fulbright postdoctoral fellowship to the New York University School of Medicine. In 1958, she worked as a research associate at Harvard University.

Torriani-Gorini started working at Massachusetts Institute of Technology as a research associate in 1960. In 1968, she attended the symposia on quantitative biology for the replication of DNA in microorganisms. From 1970 to 1973 Torriani-Gorini was on the Undergraduate Advising Committee, and she took part in the Wellesley-MIT Exchange Program from 1974 to 1978. In 1971 Torriani-Gorini became an associate professor of biology and was promoted to a full professor in 1976. In 1975, Torriani-Gorini was on the Women’s Advisory Committee, where she advocated for women in science.

Torriani-Gorini retired from MIT in 1989. In 1990, she won a Fulbright Scholarship to the Centre for Cellular and Molecular Biology in Hyderabad, India. In 1993 she was made an honorary member of the French Society of Microbiology.

== Personal life ==
Luigi Gorini and Torriani-Gorini met as colleagues in the lab in Milan in the early 1940s. Luigi Gorini was a socialist who was involved in anti-fascist activism. The two got married after World War II. The couple had a son, who died of cancer in 2019.

Torriani-Gorini and Gorini shared a passion for social and economic justice. In particular, they heavily protested against repression, inequality, and military aggression. The two transformed a house in the village of Selvino into a home for approximately 800 Jewish orphans who were liberated from concentration camps, in preparation for emigration to Palestine. For their work to house these children and their advocacy against fascism, they received the Raoul Wallenberg Commemorative Award from the state chapter of the National Conference of Christians and Jews. In 1976, the government of Israel honored them for their efforts in housing the orphaned Jewish children and teens. They were recognized by the Martyrs and Heroes Archives at Yad-Vashem, Israel.

The couple lived in Paris for 10 years before moving to the United States in 1956. According to their son, when they moved to the United States, Torriani-Gorini and Gorini continued to speak out, through newspapers, protests, and lectures, against "...US support of repressive, right-wing governments in Southeast Asia, the Americas, and Africa." They became US citizens in the early 1960s. Additionally, Torriani-Gorini made many charitable donations to the Southern Poverty Law Center and Citizens for Participation in Political Action. Following the death of her husband in 1976, Torriani-Gorini took up hiking in Nepal. When she was 78 years old, she went on her final hike to the Annapurna Sanctuary.

Torriani-Gorini died on May 2, 2013, at 94 years old in her home in Massachusetts.

== Notable publications ==
- Cohn, M., & Torriani, A.-M. (1952). The relationships in the biosynthesis of the β-galactosidase- and pz-proteins in escherichia coli. Biochimica Et Biophysica Acta, 10, 280–289. doi:10.1016/0006-3002(53)90251-0
- Ludtke, D., Bernstein, J., Hamilton, C., & Torriani, A. (1984). Identification of the PHOM gene product and its regulation in escherichia coli K-12. Journal of Bacteriology, 159(1), 19–25. doi:10.1128/jb.159.1.19-25.1984
- Muda, M; Rao, N N; Torriani, A (December 1992). "Role of PhoU in phosphate transport and alkaline phosphatase regulation". Journal of Bacteriology. 174 (24): 8057–8064. doi:10.1128/jb.174.24.8057-8064.1992. PMC 207544. PMID 1459954.
- Rao, N. N., & Torriani, A. (1988). Utilization by escherichia coli of a high-molecular-weight, linear polyphosphate: Roles of phosphatases and pore proteins. Journal of Bacteriology, 170(11), 5216–5223. doi:10.1128/jb.170.11.5216-5223.1988
- Rao, N N; Roberts, M F; Torriani, A; Yashphe, J (January 1993). "Effect of glpT and glpD mutations on expression of the phoA gene in Escherichia coli". Journal of Bacteriology. 175 (1): 74–79. doi:10.1128/jb.175.1.74-79.1993. PMC 196098. PMID 8416912.
- Rao, N. N., Wang, E., Yashphe, J., & Torriani, A. (1986). Nucleotide pool in pho regulon mutants and alkaline phosphatase synthesis in escherichia coli. Journal of Bacteriology, 166(1), 205–211. doi:10.1128/jb.166.1.205-211.1986
- Torriani, A. (1959, January). Effect of inorganic phosphate (PI) on formation of phosphates by e-coli. In Federation Proceedings (Vol. 18, No. 1, pp. 339–339). 9650 Rockville Pike, Bethesda, MD 20814-3998: FEDERATION AMER SOC EXP BIOL.
- Torriani, Annamaria (August 1990). "From cell membrane to nucleotides: The phosphate regulon in Escherichia coli". BioEssays. 12 (8): 371–376. doi:10.1002/bies.950120804. PMID 2241934. S2CID 25924916.
- Zuckier, G; Torriani, A (March 1981). "Genetic and physiological tests of three phosphate-specific transport mutants of Escherichia coli". Journal of Bacteriology. 145 (3): 1249–1256. doi:10.1128/jb.145.3.1249-1256.1981. PMC 217125. PMID 7009575.
