= George Quincey Lumsden Jr. =

American diplomat (1930–2026)

- Born: September 19, 1930; Montclair, New Jersey, U.S.
- Died: February 11, 2026 (aged 95); Washington, D.C., U.S.
- Occupation: Diplomat

George Quincey Lumsden Jr. (September 19, 1930 – February 11, 2026) was an American diplomat. A Career Foreign Service Officer, he was the American Ambassador Extraordinary and Plenipotentiary to the United Arab Emirates from July 2, 1982, until January 28, 1986.

== Early life ==
Born in Montclair, New Jersey, on September 19, 1930, his family moved to Maplewood, New Jersey, when he was a young child. He attended the public schools there through the end of junior high school and he attended high school at Deerfield Academy, from which he graduated in 1948. He received his bachelor's degree from Princeton University in 1952, majoring in Psychology. After he graduated, he joined the United States Navy, was accepted at the Officer Candidate School in Newport, Rhode Island, and graduated from there in the Fall of 1952. He spent his first two years as an engineering officer. His official rank was lieutenant. When he returned to civilian life, he worked as a group service representative at Prudential Insurance Co. in Newark and Pittsburgh.

Lumsden left Prudential and entered Georgetown University’s School of Foreign Service in 1956, a year after he left the Navy. He left after the end of his first year to enter the foreign service after having passed the exam.

== Career ==
Prior to his nomination to be Ambassador, Lumsden held the following positions:

- Program officer at the Department of State Reception Center in New York City
- Consular officer in Izmir from 1959 to 1961
- Economic officer in Bonn from 1962 to 1964
- Consular-political officer in Amman from 1965 to 1967
- From 1968 to 1969 he attended Arabic language and area studies in Beirut
- Chief of the Economic Section in Kuwait from 1969 to 1972
- In Foggy Bottom, he was country officer for Kuwait, Bahrain, Qatar, and the United Arab Emirates from 1972 to 1975
- General economic policy officer in Paris from 1976 to 1979
- From 1979 until his appointment, he was Deputy Director of Arabian Peninsula Affairs in the Department

== Death ==
Lumsden died in Washington, D.C., on February 11, 2026, at the age of 95.
