= Edward S. Walker Jr. =

American diplomat (born 1940)

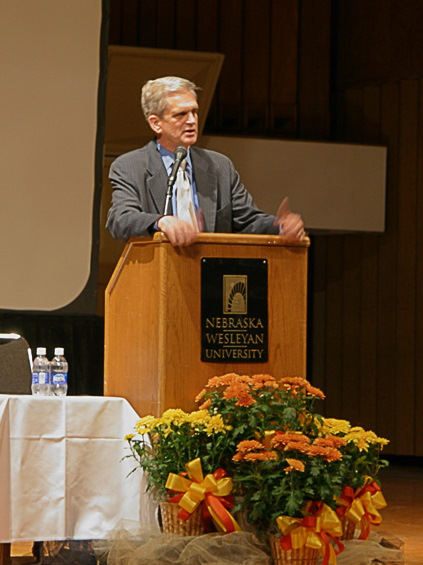
- Walker Jr. at Nebraska Wesleyan University in September 2006

19th Assistant Secretary of State for Near Eastern Affairs
- In office January 18, 2000 – May 1, 2001
- Preceded by: Martin Indyk
- Succeeded by: William J. Burns

Personal details
- Born: June 13, 1940 (age 86) Abington Township, Pennsylvania, U.S.
- Education: Hamilton College (BA); Boston University (MA)

Edward S. Walker Jr. (born June 13, 1940) is a former U.S. Ambassador to Israel, Egypt, and the UAE and is a Middle East specialist.

== Early life ==
Walker was born in Abington Township, Montgomery County, Pennsylvania. He earned his B.A. at Hamilton College in Clinton, New York, in 1963 and his M.A. from Boston University in 1965. While in college, he became a member of the Hamilton chapter of Chi Psi, a chapter which claims four U.S. Ambassadors as alumni (including Ambassador Walker). In 1985, he attended the Royal College of Defense Studies in London. In 1962, Walker enlisted in the U.S. Army and served 3 years in Heidelberg, Germany.

Ambassador Edward S. Walker Jr. is an Adjunct Scholar at the Middle East Institute's public policy center. Ambassador Walker served as MEI's President and CEO for over five years, from 2001 until August 2006.

Walker's diplomatic career:

- Assistant Secretary of State for Near Eastern Affairs (2000–2001)
- United States Ambassador to Israel (1997–1999)
- United States Ambassador to Egypt (1994–1997)
- Deputy Permanent Representative of the United States to the United Nations with Ambassadorial Rank (1993–1994)
- United States Ambassador to the United Arab Emirates (1989–1992). Through the period of the Gulf War.
- Deputy Chief of Mission, U.S. Embassy, Riyadh, Saudi Arabia
- Deputy Assistant Secretary in the Bureau of Near Eastern Affairs (1988-).
- Executive Assistant to the Deputy Secretary of State (1982–1984)
- Special Assistant to the President's Special Representative for the Middle East Peace Negotiations (1979–1981)
- Entered the Foreign Service in 1967.

In the course of his career, Walker worked with every Israeli Prime Minister since Golda Meir, with Presidents Anwar Sadat and Hosni Mubarak of Egypt, with Presidents Hafez al-Assad and Bashar al-Assad of Syria, with King Fahd and Crown Prince Abdullah of Saudi Arabia, and with Kings Hussein and Abdullah of Jordon, among others. During his time as Ambassador to Israel, Walker worked closely with Prime Minister Netanyahu in preparation for and during the Wye negotiations. He started the negotiations with Libya which led to Libya's decision to abandon its weapons of mass destruction programs and pay almost 3 billion US dollars in compensation to the families of Pan Am Flight 103 as well as UTA Flight 772. In Egypt he worked with Vice President Al Gore and President Hosni Mubarak on a major initiative to reform the Egyptian economy. Walker also worked with US and Egyptian intelligence officials to counter the terrorist threat facing that country.

Walker previously worked with Colin Powell in the new Bush Administration as assistant secretary of state for Near-Eastern affairs, a position he had previously held under Madeleine Albright during the second Clinton administration. During that time he helped initiate and negotiate U.S. policy toward Iraq and engaged in recalibrating U.S. policies toward Iran and the Middle East peace process.

Currently, Edward S. Walker Jr. holds the Christian A. Johnson Distinguished Professorship in Global Political Theory at Hamilton College. He formerly served as the Linowitz Professor of Middle East Studies in 2003 and 2005. During the Fall 2008, he is teaching "Global Challenges" and "Terrorism, Islam and Counter-terrorism". In the spring 2009, he will teach "Democracy, Religion and International Cooperation" and "International Decision-Making."

== Sources ==
- United States Department of State: Chiefs of Mission by Country, 1778-2005

Diplomatic posts
Preceded by David Lyle Mack	U.S. Ambassador to United Arab Emirates; 1989–1992	Succeeded by William Arthur Rugh
Preceded by Robert H. Pelletreau	U.S. Ambassador to Egypt; 1994–1997	Succeeded by Daniel C. Kurtzer
Preceded by Martin Indyk	U.S. Ambassador to Israel; 1997–2000	Succeeded by Martin Indyk
Government offices
Preceded by Martin Indyk	Assistant Secretary of State for Near Eastern Affairs; 2000–2001	Succeeded by William J. Burns
