= The Budapest Beacon =

US-based Hungarian online newspaper

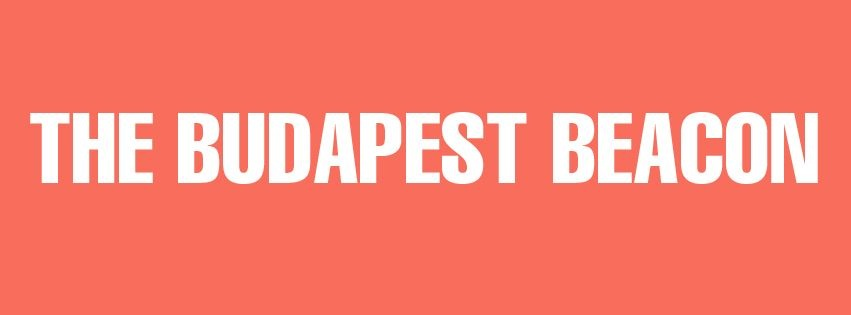
- Type: News website
- Publisher: Real Reporting Foundation
- Editor-in-chief: Robert Field
- Staff writers: 5
- Founded: November 13, 2013
- Ceased publication: April 13, 2018
- Language: English, Hungarian
- Headquarters: Lancaster, Pennsylvania
- Website: Budapest Beacon (EN) Budapest Beacon (HU)

The Budapest Beacon was an online newspaper that reported on current events in Hungary. It was published by United States–based Real Reporting Foundation, a news organization.

== Online presence ==
In July 2014, Hungarian news portals reported that The Budapest Beacon planned to launch a Hungarian-language news website that September.

The newspaper was often critical of the Fidesz government.

A number of Hungarian and international media outlets have reported on Hungarian events using content attributed to The Budapest Beacon, including The Jerusalem Post, the GlobalPost, Catholic World News, The Budapest Times, Mandiner.hu, Der Standard, and Gawker, The Washington Post, and Haaretz.

== Defunction ==
The online newspaper ceased publication on 13 April 2018.

== See also ==
- List of newspapers in Hungary
- Fourth Estate
