= Martin Indyk =

American diplomat (1951–2024)

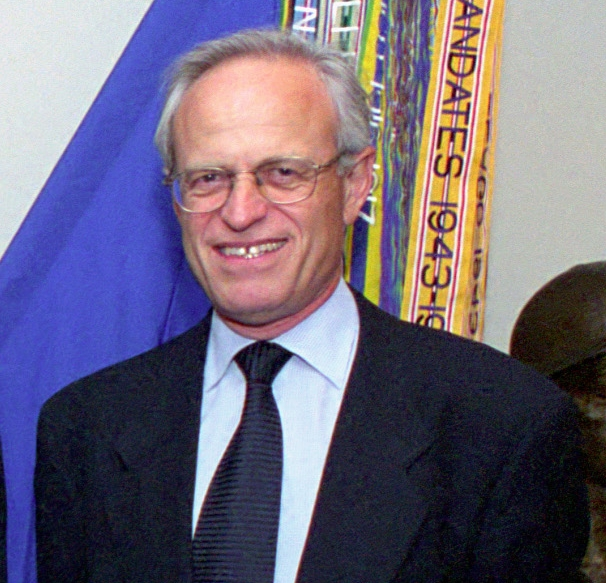
- Indyk in 2001

United States Special Envoy for Middle East Peace
- In office July 29, 2013 – June 27, 2014
- President: Barack Obama
- Preceded by: Frank Lowenstein (acting)
- Succeeded by: Frank Lowenstein

United States Ambassador to Israel
- In office January 25, 2000 – July 13, 2001
- President: Bill Clinton
- Preceded by: Edward S. Walker Jr.
- Succeeded by: Daniel C. Kurtzer
- In office April 10, 1995 – September 27, 1997
- President: Bill Clinton
- Preceded by: Edward Djerejian
- Succeeded by: Edward S. Walker Jr.

18th Assistant Secretary of State for Near Eastern Affairs
- In office October 14, 1997 – November 16, 1999
- President: Bill Clinton
- Preceded by: Robert Pelletreau
- Succeeded by: Edward S. Walker Jr.

Personal details
- Born: Martin Sean Indyk; July 1, 1951 London, England
- Died: July 25, 2024 (aged 73) New Fairfield, Connecticut, U.S.
- Spouse(s): Jill Collier (divorced) Gahl Hodges Burt (m. 2013)
- Children: 2
- Relatives: Ivor Indyk (brother)
- Education: University of Sydney (BA); Hebrew University of Jerusalem; Australian National University (MA, PhD)

Martin Sean Indyk (July 1, 1951 – July 25, 2024) was an Australian-American diplomat and foreign relations analyst with expertise in the Middle East.

Indyk was a distinguished fellow in International Diplomacy and later executive vice president at the Brookings Institution in Washington, D.C. from 2001 to 2018.

Indyk served twice as United States Ambassador to Israel (1995–1997; 2000–2001) and also as Assistant Secretary of State for Near East Affairs during the Clinton Administration.

== Background ==
Martin Indyk was born in 1951 in London, England, to Jewish parents who had emigrated from Poland. His mother had lived in Mandatory Palestine before emigrating to New Zealand while his father emigrated to Australia and settled in Sydney. His father was studying medicine in London at the time of his birth. The family settled in Australia during his childhood, and Indyk grew up in the Sydney suburb of Castlecrag. His older brother is the Australian academic and publisher Ivor Indyk.

Indyk graduated from the University of Sydney in 1972 with a Bachelor of Economics. He then moved to Israel for postgraduate studies at the Hebrew University of Jerusalem. While was living in Jerusalem preparing for university courses, the Yom Kippur War broke out, and Indyk spent the rest of the war volunteering on kibbutz Alumim in southern Israel, an experience he called "a defining moment in my life." Indyk stated that he had even considered immigrating to Israel at the time. He returned to graduate school and received a PhD in international relations from the Australian National University in 1977.

Indyk immigrated to the United States in 1982 and started work with a lobbying group in Washington, D.C. He became a naturalized U.S. citizen in 1993, a week before joining the National Security Council. Indyk was a Reform Jew.

Indyk married Jill Collier, with whom he had two children, Sarah and Jacob. They later divorced. In 2013, he married Gahl Hodges Burt, a former aide to Henry Kissinger and a White House social secretary during the Ronald Reagan administration.

== Political and diplomatic career ==
In 1982, Indyk began working as a deputy research director for the American Israel Public Affairs Committee (AIPAC), a pro-Israel lobbying group in Washington. From 1985 Indyk served eight years as the founding Executive Director of the Washington Institute for Near East Policy, a research institute specializing in analysis of Middle East policy.

Indyk was an adjunct professor at the Johns Hopkins School of Advanced International Studies, where he taught Israeli politics and foreign policy. Indyk also taught at the Middle East Institute at Columbia University, the Moshe Dayan Center for Middle Eastern and African Studies at Tel Aviv University, and the Department of Politics at Macquarie University in Sydney, Australia. Indyk published widely on U.S. policy toward the Arab–Israeli peace process, on U.S.–Israeli relations, and on the threats to Middle East stability posed by Iraq and Iran.

Indyk served as special assistant to President Bill Clinton and as senior director of Near East and South Asian Affairs at the National Security Council. While at the NSC, he served as principal adviser to the President and the National Security Advisor on Arab–Israeli issues, Iraq, Iran, and South Asia. He was a senior member of Secretary of State Warren Christopher's Middle East peace team and served as the White House representative on the U.S. Israel Science and Technology Commission.

He served two stints as United States Ambassador to Israel, from April 1995 to September 1997, and from January 2000 to July 2001.

Indyk served on the board of the New Israel Fund. Indyk later served on the advisory board for DC based non-profit America Abroad Media.

On 29 July 2013, Indyk took leave from the Brookings Institution and was appointed by President Barack Obama as Washington's special Middle East envoy for the resumption of peace talks between Israel and the Palestinian Authority. Both Israeli Prime Minister Benjamin Netanyahu and Palestinian President Mahmoud Abbas favored his appointment. He resigned from this position June 27, 2014, returning to the Brookings Institution as its vice president and director for foreign policy. In 2018, he left Brookings for the Council on Foreign Relations.

Indyk was a distinguished fellow at the Council on Foreign Relations from 2018 until his death in 2024.

== Controversy ==
In 2000, Indyk was placed under investigation by the FBI after allegations arose that he had improperly handled sensitive material by using an unclassified laptop computer on an airplane flight to prepare his memos of meetings with foreign leaders. There was no indication that any classified material had been compromised, and no indication of espionage.

Indyk was "apparently ... the first serving U.S. ambassador to be stripped of government security clearance." The Los Angeles Times reported that "veteran diplomats complained that Indyk was being made a scapegoat for the kinds of security lapses that are rather common among envoys who take classified work home from the office." Indyk's clearance was suspended but was reinstated the next month, "for the duration of the current crisis," given "the continuing turmoil in Israel, the West Bank and Gaza [Strip] and for compelling national security reasons."

== Criticism ==
=== Donations from Qatar to Brookings ===
In 2014, Indyk came under scrutiny when a New York Times investigation revealed that Qatar had made a $14.8 million, four-year donation to the Brookings Institution in order to fund two Brookings initiatives, the Brookings Center in Doha and the Project on U.S. Relations with the Islamic World. The Times investigation found that Brookings was one of more than a dozen influential Washington think tanks and research organizations that "have received tens of millions of dollars from foreign governments in recent years while pushing United States government officials to adopt policies that often reflect the donors' priorities." A number of scholars interviewed by the Times expressed alarm at the trend, saying that the "donations have led to implicit agreements that the research groups would refrain from criticizing the donor governments."

The revelation of the think tank's choice to accept the payment from Qatar was especially controversial because at the time, Indyk was acting as a peace negotiator between Israel and the Palestinians, and Qatar is one of the main financial backers of Hamas, "the mortal enemy of both the State of Israel and Mahmoud Abbas' Fatah party." Hamas political chief Khaled Meshaal, who directs Hamas's operations against Israel, is also harbored by Qatar. Indyk defended the arrangement with Qatar, contending that it did not influence the think tank's work and that "to be policy-relevant, we need to engage policy makers." However, the arrangement between Qatar and Brookings caused Israeli government officials to doubt Indyk's impartiality.

=== Views on Israel ===
Indyk's career "featured two abiding, and at times competing, characteristics: his support for Israel, and his disdain for Israel's West Bank settlement activity." Indyk's views "have irked both Israel and the Palestinians at various times."

Isi Leibler criticized Indyk in a 2010 Jerusalem Post op-ed, calling him an "anti-Israel apologist." In 2014, Haaretz reported that "Indyk is being identified in Jerusalem as the anonymous source" in an article by Nahum Barnea of the Yedioth Ahronoth, "in which unnamed American officials blamed Israel for the failure of the peace talks." The anonymous source in Yediot Acharonot was quoted as saying: "The Jewish people are supposed to be smart; it is true that they’re also considered a stubborn nation. You're supposed to know how to read the map: In the 21st century, the world will not keep tolerating the Israeli occupation. The occupation threatens Israel's status in the world and threatens Israel as a Jewish state...The Palestinians are tired of the status quo. They will get their state in the end – whether through violence or by turning to international organizations." The remarks angered Israeli officials.

== Media appearances ==
While promoting his book, Innocent Abroad: An Intimate Account of American Peace Diplomacy, on 8 January 2009, Indyk engaged in a discussion of Israeli–Palestinian peace negotiations with Norman Finkelstein on Democracy Now!. Indyk indicated he felt "sandbagged" by not being informed "that I was going to be in some kind of debate with Norman Finkelstein. I’m not interested in doing that. I’m also not here as a spokesman for Israel".

== Death ==
Indyk died from esophageal cancer on 25 July 2024 at his home in New Fairfield, Connecticut; he was 73.

== Publications ==
=== Books ===
- Restoring the Balance: A Middle East Strategy for the Next President. Washington, D.C.: Brookings Institution Press. 2008. ISBN 978-0815738695.
- Innocent Abroad: An Intimate Account of American Peace Diplomacy in the Middle East. New York: Simon & Schuster. 2009. ISBN 978-1416594291.
- Bending History: Barack Obama's Foreign Policy. Washington, D.C.: Brookings Institution Press. 2012. ISBN 978-0815721826. (Written with Kenneth G. Lieberthal and Michael O'Hanlon)
- Master of the Game: Henry Kissinger and the Art of Middle East Diplomacy. New York: Alfred A. Knopf. 2021. ISBN 978-1101947548.

=== Articles ===
- Martin Indyk, "The Strange Resurrection of the Two-State Solution: How an Unimaginable War Could Bring About the Only Imaginable Peace", Foreign Affairs, vol. 103, no. 2 (March/April 2024), pp. 8–12, 14–22.

Diplomatic posts
Preceded by Edward Djerejian	United States Ambassador to Israel; 1995–1997	Succeeded by Edward S. Walker Jr.
Preceded by Edward S. Walker Jr.	United States Ambassador to Israel; 2000–2001	Succeeded by Daniel C. Kurtzer
Government offices
Preceded by Robert Pelletreau	Assistant Secretary of State for Near Eastern Affairs; 1997–1999	Succeeded by Edward S. Walker Jr.
