= Raoul Wallenberg Award =

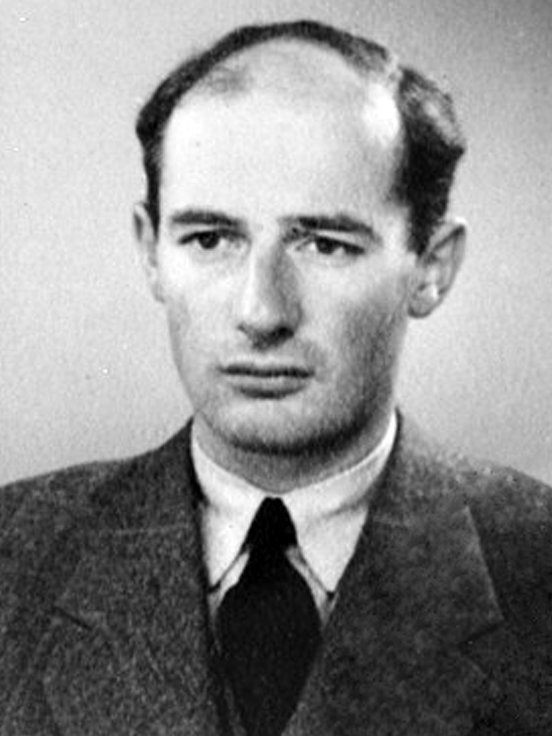
Raoul Wallenberg in 1944

The Raoul Wallenberg Award is bestowed by The Raoul Wallenberg Committee of the United States on "individuals, organizations, and communities whose courage, selflessness and success against great odds personified those of Raoul Wallenberg himself." It has been awarded periodically since 1985, when the inaugural award was given to Wallenberg himself.

The most recent recipients of the award are French singer Charles Aznavour and his sister Aïda, for the work of their family, most notably their father Mischa, who sheltered Jews from the Nazis in the basement of the family home during the Third Reich's occupation of France during World War II.

The Committee has also given Civic Courage Awards since 1986.

== Honorees ==
The following people and organizations have received Raoul Wallenberg Awards:

- Raoul Wallenberg (1985), inaugural award made in absentia
- Michael Wood (doctor) (1986), for creating Amref Health Africa
- H. Ross Perot (1987), for the rescue of his American employees in Iran
- Senpo Sugihara (1990), for rescuing Jews in Lithuania
- Miep Gies (1994), for protection of Anne Frank
- Giorgio Perlasca (1990), who worked at the Spanish Embassy in Budapest and saved thousands of Jews
- Alan C. Greenberg (1991), for his work with the Raoul Wallenberg Committee of the United States
- Harvey M. Meyerhoff (1994), for the United States Holocaust Museum
- Nicholas M. Salgo (1994), for donating a statue of Wallenberg in Budapest, Hungary
- Thomas Veres (1994), who was Wallenberg's personal photographer
- Elizabeth Dole (1995), for work with the American Red Cross
- Robert S. Strauss (1997), for his work on finding the fate of Wallenberg as Ambassador to the Soviet Union
- Elisabeth and Alexander Sandor Kasser (2000), Wallenberg's translator
- Göran Persson of Sweden (2001), for Holocaust education in Sweden
- William Basch of Czechoslovakia (2003), for humanitarian work in Budapest
- Sister Luise Radlmeier (2006), for humanitarian work in East Africa
- Elliott Broidy (2008), for providing economic stability to Israel's economy during the time of the Second Intifada
- Bujar Nishani (2015), for the gratitude towards the people of Albania, on rescuing the Jews during the World War II
- Charles and Aïda Aznavour (2017) for the role of the Aznavour family in sheltering Jews during the Nazi occupation of Paris during World War II

The Roul Wallenberg Award for the year 2022 was given to an Indian from the state of Tamilnadu named Vincent Raj Arokiasamy. Also known as "Evidence Kathir" for his extraordinary efforts in saving more than 25,000 victims in 3,000 incidents of human rights violations in India.

=== Civic Courage Award Recipients ===
The following people and organizations have received Civic Courage Awards from the Raoul Wallenberg Committee of the United States:

- Coeur D'Alene, Idaho (1986), for work against militant Neo-Nazis
- Denmark (1990), for the Rescue of the Danish Jews
- Billings, Montana (1997), for setting an example for American communities in standing up to bigotry
- Mark Kroeker (1999), of the LAPD
- New York City (2001), for the efforts of citizens in the aftermath of the September 11 attacks

=== Raoul Wallenberg Commemorative Award ===
- Annamaria Torriani-Gorini (1987), received the Raoul Wallenberg Commemorative Award from the state chapter of the National Conference of Christians and Jews, at the Cathedral of St. Paul, Worcester, Massachusetts, for her work with the Resistance against the fascists during the Second World War and her efforts to house more than 800 children, who had survived the Nazi concentration camps. She, along with her husband, Luigi Gorini, found a suitable property in Selvino, a small village in the Italian province of Bergamo, to look after these children for close to three years, until they could be re-settled in Israel.

=== Council of Europe Raoul Wallenberg Prize ===
In 2014, the Raoul Wallenberg Prize of €10,000 was initiated by the Swedish Government the Hungarian Parliament, and the Council of Europe, to be awarded every two years to reward extraordinary humanitarian achievements. The following people have received this prize:

- Amani Ballour (2020), a Syrian pediatrician who ran an underground hospital during the Siege of Eastern Ghouta as part of the Syrian Civil War.

==== Hungary's Raoul Wallenberg Award ====
The Raoul Wallenberg Award was first given in Hungary in 2010. In 2020 the award was given to six people: Reformed Church pastor Tamás Majsai, historian and journalist Barbara Kaczvinszky, documentary filmmaker Jenő Setét, civil rights activist László Bogdan, Evangelical pastor Gábor Iványi, and church historian János Szigeti.
