= Harvey Sicherman =

American writer and foreign policy expert

Harvey Sicherman (1945–2010) was an American writer and foreign policy expert. He served as the President and Director of the Foreign Policy Research Institute, located in Philadelphia, from 1993 until 2010. His interests lay in the analysis of U.S. foreign policy and national security, as well as in the areas of Western Europe, the Middle East, and International Economics. Born in Scranton, Pennsylvania, in 1945, Sicherman died on December 25, 2010.

== Education ==
In 1966, Sicherman earned a B.A. in history from the University of Scranton and completed his Ph.D. in political science in 1971 at the University of Pennsylvania, where he received the Salvatori Fellowship.

== Career ==
Sicherman served as the associate director for Research at the Foreign Policy Research Institute (FPRI) from 1978 through 1980. He then served as Special Assistant to the then Secretary of State, Alexander Haig, from 1981 to 1982. Following this, from 1982 to 1987, Sicherman was a consultant for the Secretary of the Navy, John F. Lehman, Jr. and in 1988, he was a consultant for Secretary of State George Shultz. From 1991 to 1992, Sicherman was a member of the Policy Planning Staff of Secretary of State James A. Baker, III.

== Bibliography ==
Sicherman authored or edited many books, chapters, and articles. These include:

- The Three Percent Solution and the Future of NATO (1982)
- Palestinian Autonomy, Self-Government and Peace (Westview Press, 1993)
- New Directions in U.S.-Chinese Relations, coauthored with former Secretary of State Alexander Haig Jr. (1997)
- The Chinese Economy: A New Scenario, coedited with Murray Weidenbaum (1999)
- America the Vulnerable: Our Military Problems and How To Fix Them, co-edited with John Lehman (2002)
- Is There Still A West? The Future of the Atlantic Alliance, co-edited with William Anthony Hay (2007)
- The War on Terror: Collected Essays, 2001–2006, co-edited with Stephen Gale and Michael Radu (2007)
- Cheap Hawks, Cheap Doves, and the Pursuit of American Strategy (working draft)

He served as editor of Templeton Lectures on Religion and World Affairs, 1996-2007 (FPRI, 2008).
