= Thomas Veres =

Holocaust photographer

Thomas Veres (born c. 1926 in Budapest) was the photographer for Raoul Wallenberg who documented the Holocaust in Budapest during World War II.

His photographs were used in the film The Last Days (1998), directed by James Moll.
