= Eliminalia =

Spanish reputation management company

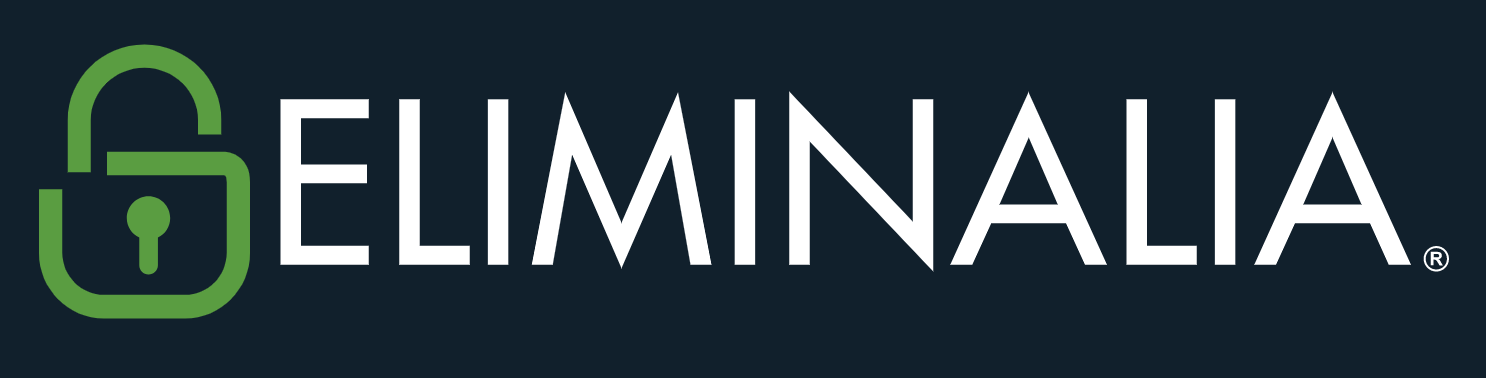
- Type: Private Company
- Industry: Online reputation
- Founded: 2011
- Founder: Diego Sánchez, known as Dídac Sánchez
- Headquarters: Kyiv, Ukraine; Barcelona, Spain
- Number of employees: 85 (2020)
- Website: eliminalia.com/en/

Eliminalia, rebranded as 'Idata Protection' in January 2023 is a Spanish company which has specialized in reputation management. It was founded in 2011 by Diego Sánchez, known as Dídac Sánchez. The technical offices are in Kyiv, Ukraine. Eliminalia is the property of Maidan Holdings, a Miami-based holding company.

== History ==
Eliminalia was founded in 2011 by Spanish entrepreneur Diego Sánchez.

In 2015, Eliminalia offered free services to individuals affected by the Ashley Madison data breach.

In 2020, Eliminalia received several vanity awards: Technology Innovator Awards 2020 by AI Global Media and Cyber Security Company of the Year by Corporate LiveWire.

In 2021, Qurium, an NGO dedicated to the defense of digital rights, accused Eliminalia of creating a network of fake websites with back-dated articles and then spamming them with apparently legal DMCA takedown notices and GDPR complaints. These were intended to take down articles referring to corruption in Angola regarding Isabel dos Santos and Vincent Miclet.

Eliminalia rebranded to Idata Protection in January 2023.

== Legal ==
In 2023, approximately 50,000 internal documents leaked to French nonprofit Forbidden Stories revealed allegations that Eliminalia used deceptive tactics to help clients across 50 countries suppress unfavorable online information. Eliminalia allegedly uses an array of underhanded tactics to stifle criticism of its clients, from intimidating journalists to churning out fake news on websites such as Taiwan Times, Mayday Washington, CNN News Today, and London Uncensored - all of which are connected to Maidan Holdings (Eliminalia's parent company). Using falsified copyright infringement notices, the company manipulates "right to be forgotten" laws, designed to protect people from malicious material online, by sending emails that appear to be from the European Commission to journalists and publishers of the unwanted articles.

The company's reported clients included convicted drug traffickers, Venezuelan officials, individuals linked to organized crime, former Banca Privada d'Andorra officials, and individuals accused of financial crimes. Among those identified were Malchas Tetruashvili, convicted of money laundering for Georgian mafia boss Tariel Oniani, and José Mestré, convicted of cocaine trafficking. Other clients reportedly faced allegations involving money laundering, illegal exports to Syria, and cryptocurrency fraud.
