= Geneva Initiative =

Proposal for a two-state solution in the Israel-Palestine peace process

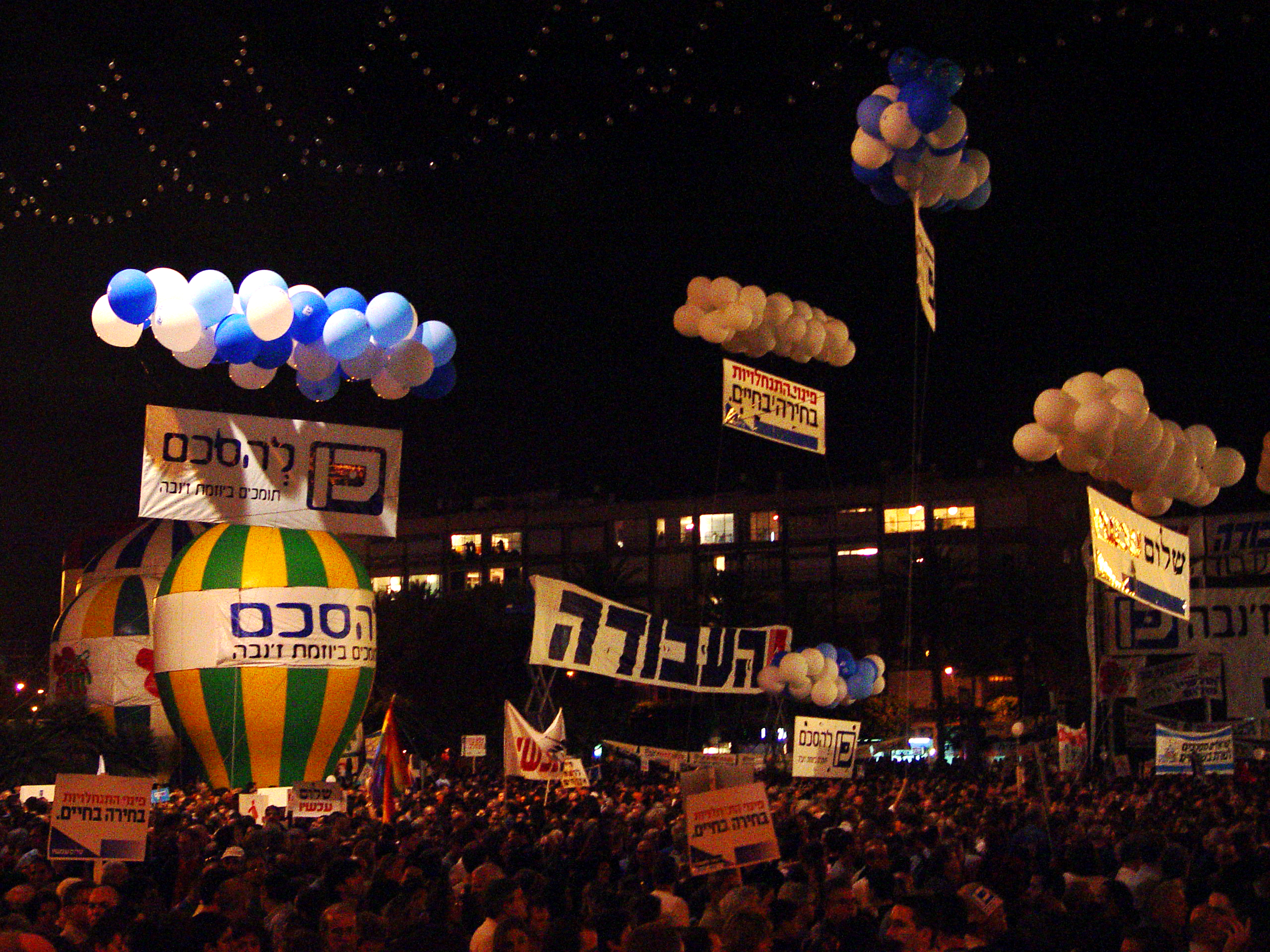
Demonstration in Tel Aviv supporting the Geneva Accord, 2004

The Geneva Initiative, also known as the Geneva Accord, is a draft Permanent Status Agreement to end the Israeli–Palestinian conflict, based on previous official negotiations, international resolutions, the Quartet Roadmap, the Clinton Parameters, and the Arab Peace Initiative. The document was finished on 12 October 2003.

The Accord was prepared in secret for over 2 years before the 50-page document was officially launched on 1 December 2003, at a ceremony in Geneva, Switzerland. Among its creators were formal negotiators and architects of previous rounds of Israeli-Palestinian negotiations, including former Israeli minister and politician Yossi Beilin and former Palestinian Authority minister Yasser Abed Rabbo. Both noted that the Geneva accord did not obligate either of their respective governments, even though Abed Rabbo was a minister at the time of writing. The Initiative got broad international support, but was heavily criticised by Israeli Prime Minister Ariel Sharon.

In September 2009, a detailed expanded version of the plan was released. The annexes serve as a supplement to the Geneva Accord, outlining the practical measures required for successful implementation of the two-state solution. They cover key issues including security, border crossings, the Implementation and Verification Group (IVG), roads, water management, environmental concerns, the economy, and the division of Jerusalem.

In 2022, Yossi Beilin, a founder of the Geneva Initiative, and other Israeli and Palestinian interlocutors proposed "The Holy Land Confederation" as a means of facilitating the two-state solution envisioned by the Geneva Initiative. In proposing a confederation, Beilin's thinking moved closer to the confederation proposed by A Land for All.

== Outline ==
The Geneva Initiative addresses and presents a comprehensive solution to all issues vital to ensuring the end of the conflict and the realization of the national visions of both parties. It would give the Palestinians almost all of the West Bank and Gaza Strip drawing Israel's borders close to what existed prior to the Israeli control of territory at the culmination of the 1967 war.

The plan has much similarity with the 2000 Camp David Summit and Taba Summit proposals, and Olmert's 2008 Napkin map. Only settlements along the Green Line would be annexed by Israel with mutual land swaps, including Ma'ale Adumim, Pisgat Ze'ev and Giv'at Ze'ev. In the Geneva Initiative, Ariel would be dismantled and the Palestinians be given more sovereignty over East Jerusalem. Jerusalem would be divided administratively, with East Jerusalem ("Al-Quds") serving as the capital of the Palestinian state and West Jerusalem ("Yerushalayim") as the capital of Israel. A Multinational Force would play an important role. In return for removing most of the Israeli settlements, the Palestinians would limit their "right of return" of refugees to Israel to a number specified by the Israeli government and would put an end to any further claims and demands from Israel.

"The Holy Land Confederation" would modify the Geneva Initiative plan by giving settlers currently living in the future Palestinian state the option of permanent residency in Palestine, with an equal number of Palestinian refugees being allowed to reside in Israel.

== Summary ==
=== Key concepts ===
The key concepts included in the Geneva Accord are:

- A mutual Israeli–Palestinian declaration of an end to the conflict and future claims.
- Mutual recognition of both nations and their right to an independent state.
- Almost complete Israeli withdrawal to the 1967 borders, with a limited number of settlement blocs on the basis of a 1:1 land swap.
- A comprehensive solution to the issue of the Palestinian refugees based on the Clinton Parameters (2000); of which the main component will be compensation and a return to an independent Palestinian State.
- Jewish Jerusalem as Israel’s capital and Arab Jerusalem as Palestine’s capital with Jewish areas under Israeli sovereignty and Arab areas under Palestinian sovereignty.
- A non-militarized Palestinian state and detailed security arrangements.

=== Refugees ===
The proposal for the Palestinian refugee problem is modeled after UNGAR 194, UNSC Resolution 242, and the Arab Peace Initiative. It outlines a compensation plan for recognition of "Refugeehood" and loss of property and a remuneration plan for states that have hosted Palestinian refugees. The Geneva Accord outlines multiple options and modalities for refugees to exercise a choice of permanent place of residence (PPR) in accordance with clauses set forth in the document, some of which include the option to elect to remain in their present host countries, or relocate to third countries, among them Israel, at the sovereign discretion of third countries.

=== Borders and territory ===
The Geneva Accord bases the International Border between the States of Palestine and Israel on the June 4th 1967 lines, in accordance with UNSC Resolution 242 and UNSC Resolution 338, with reciprocal modifications in the form of landswaps on a 1:1 basis. Israel will annex several areas currently densely populated by Jewish settlements near the Green Line (such as Gush Etzion). In return for areas annexed by Israel from the West Bank, the Palestinians will receive territory of equal area and quality adjacent mostly to the Gaza Strip. The State of Israel will assume responsibility for resettling the Israelis living in what would be determined as Palestinian sovereign territory such as Ariel and other settlements.

=== Jerusalem ===
The sharing of Jerusalem will be addressed along the Clinton Parameters. Jewish Jerusalem will serve as Israel’s capital and Arab Jerusalem as Palestine’s capital. Each state would be sovereign over the neighborhoods predominately inhabited by its respective community. The Old City will be open and free to movement and the parties will commit to safeguarding the character, holiness, and freedom of worship in the city. The Implementation and Verification Group will act as an impartial international presence to monitor and verify the preservation of cultural heritage in the Old City in accordance with UNESCO World Heritage List rules. The IVG will establish an Old City Policing Unit to perform policing duties to defuse local tensions and resolve disputes.

=== International supervision ===
An Implementation and Verification Group (IVG) will be established to facilitate, assist in, guarantee, monitor, and resolve disputes relating to the implementation of the agreement. Under the authority of the IVG would be a Multinational Force (MF) which will serve to provide security guarantees to the Parties, act as a deterrent, and oversee the implementation of the relevant provisions of the agreement. The specific details related to the composition of the MF and responsibilities of the IVG as a whole are outlined in the annexes.

== Support ==
=== Palestine and Israel ===
Yasser Arafat praised the "brave initiative that opens the door to peace". It was reported by Palestinian sources that Arafat and Ahmed Qurei had approved the Geneva initiative in principle but not the details, and sent official representatives to the launching ceremony.

The Jerusalem Post reported on 10 March 2008 that influential Palestinian figure Marwan Barghouti had told Israeli politician Haim Oron "that it was possible for Israel and the Palestinians to reach a final-status agreement along the lines of the Geneva Initiative". A June 2010 poll conducted by the Harry S. Truman Research Institute for the Advancement of Peace at the Hebrew University of Jerusalem and the Palestinian Center for Policy and Survey Research in Ramallah found support for the Geneva/Clinton Parameters running at about 49% amongst Palestinians and 52% among Israelis. The level of opposition was equal at 49% in the Palestinian community, but stood at 37% for Israelis.

=== United States ===
- George W. Bush: "[The Geneva Accord] is productive, so long as they adhere to the principles [to] fight off terror, that there must be security, and there must be the emergence of a Palestinian state that is democratic and free."
- Colin Powell: "The U.S. remains committed to the President's two-state vision and to the road map, but we also believe that projects such as yours are important in helping to sustain an atmosphere of hope in which Israelis and Palestinians can discuss mutually acceptable resolutions to the difficult issues that confront them."
- Bill Clinton: "That's why the agreement in Geneva is so important. ... Such efforts prove that Israelis and Palestinians of goodwill can agree on even the most vexing settlement issues."

=== Other international support ===
- Fifty-eight former presidents, prime ministers, foreign ministers and other global leaders, among them former presidents Mikhail Gorbachev of the Soviet Union and F.W. de Klerk of South Africa, issued a statement expressing "strong support" for the plan. Other world leaders who voiced their backing included King Mohammed VI of Morocco, British Prime Minister Tony Blair, President Hosni Mubarak of Egypt and Clinton.

== Criticism ==
=== Palestinian criticism ===
Palestinian support was not universal. Some strongly opposed the plan and its apparent trade-off of the Palestinian right of return in exchange for statehood. Jamal Zakut, one of the participants and drafters of the plan from the Palestinian side, argued that the section dealing with the refugee issue has "certain ambiguity" and the whole purpose of this document is only to be a model for a future agreement. "The document does not indicate or ensure full and collective return of millions of Palestinians but neither does it waive this right … the document is only another tool by which we continue the struggle to restore our national rights and achieve peace as confirmed by international community and nothing more".

=== Israeli criticism ===
Upon the Geneva Accord's release in 2003, the government of Israel headed by Ariel Sharon criticized the accord.

A publicity campaign on the Israel Broadcasting Authority stations was cancelled after an Israel Radio investigation raised suspicions of questionable financing. Silvan Shalom, who was the Foreign Affairs Minister of Israel at the time, revealed the significant foreign national funding of Beilin's plan, and the Israeli government protested this foreign meddling in internal affairs.

== Follow-up ==
Since the writing of the Geneva Accord, the Geneva Initiative developed two cooperating not-for-profit associations / Non-Government Organizations (NGOs), Heskem (H.L. Education for Peace/Geneva Initiative-Israel) on the Israeli side and their Palestinian counterpart Palestine Peace Coalition/Geneva Initiative (PPC/GI). The organizations work together and among their respective communities to promote the Accord’s mission of a negotiated agreement between Israel and Palestine, and to prepare public opinion and leadership to be accepting of the compromises required to solve the conflict.

The Geneva Initiative NGOs educate and campaign, both locally and internationally, that it is in the best interest of Israelis and Palestinians to negotiate directly in order to reach a sustainable two-state solution.

== See also ==
- Israeli–Palestinian peace process
- Projects working for peace among Israelis and Arabs
- List of Middle East peace proposals
- International law and the Arab–Israeli conflict
- Middle East economic integration

Arab–Israeli diplomacy and treaties

- Paris Peace Conference, 1919
- Faisal–Weizmann Agreement (1919)
- 1949 Armistice Agreements
- Camp David Accords (1978)
- Egypt–Israel peace treaty (1979)
- Madrid Conference of 1991
- Oslo Accords (1993, 1995)
- Israel–Jordan peace treaty (1994)
- Camp David 2000 Summit
- Froman–Amayreh Agreement
