= 2000 Camp David Summit =

Failed attempt to end the Israeli–Palestinian conflict

U.S. president Bill Clinton, Israeli prime minister Ehud Barak and Palestinian leader Yasser Arafat at Camp David, July 2000

The 2000 Camp David Summit was a summit meeting at Camp David between United States president Bill Clinton, Israeli prime minister Ehud Barak and Palestinian Authority chairman Yasser Arafat. The summit took place between 11 and 25 July 2000 and was an effort to end the Israeli–Palestinian conflict. The summit ended without an agreement, largely due to irreconcilable differences between Israelis and Palestinians on the status of Jerusalem. Its failure is considered one of the main triggers of the Second Intifada.

The issues discussed included the establishment of a Palestinian state, the fate of Israeli settlements (illegal under international law), the status of Jerusalem, the question of Palestinian refugees, and potential Israeli control over the airspace and borders of a future Palestinian state. The summit ended after irreconcilable differences over who should have sovereignty over the Temple Mount (which Muslims call Haram al-Sharif or Al-Aqsa): Barak insisted on Israeli sovereignty, while Arafat insisted on Palestinian sovereignty.

Reports of the outcome of the summit have been described as illustrating the Rashomon effect, in which the multiple witnesses gave contradictory and self-serving interpretations. After the summit, the Israeli narrative was widely accepted by the American media, which sought to cast Arafat as a villain and that Palestinians did not want peace. That narrative led to the decline of the Israeli peace movement.

== Summit ==
U.S. president Bill Clinton announced his invitation to Israeli prime minister Ehud Barak and Yasser Arafat on 5 July 2000, to come to Camp David, Maryland, in order to continue their negotiations on the Middle East peace process. There was a hopeful precedent in the 1978 Camp David Accords where President Jimmy Carter was able to broker a peace agreement between Egypt, represented by President Anwar Sadat, and Israel represented by Prime Minister Menachem Begin. The Oslo Accords of 1993 between the later assassinated Israeli prime minister Yitzhak Rabin and Palestine Liberation Organization chairman Yasser Arafat had provided that agreement should be reached on all outstanding issues between the Palestinians and Israeli sides – the so-called final status settlement – within five years of the implementation of Palestinian autonomy. However, the interim process put in place under Oslo had fulfilled neither Israeli nor Palestinian expectations.

On 11 July, the Camp David 2000 Summit convened, although the Palestinians considered the summit premature. They even saw it as a "trap" – meaning either they would be pressured into agreeing to Israeli demands, or they would be blamed for the summit's failure. Many sources have said the Summit was rushed. Daniel C. Kurtzer and Scott Lasensky wrote that American diplomats "scrambled at the last minute to put together U.S. positions on complex issues such as Jerusalem and borders." Israeli diplomat Gilead Sher would later write, "the most serious shortcoming of the American team was that some of its members appeared to be less knowledgeable than the president in the details and implications of the process." Yasser Abed Rabbo, member of the Palestinian negotiating team, recalled: "It was chaos. Every day a different meeting, committee and issue. We didn’t know what were our aims, to succeed, to fail, to escape."

The summit ended on 25 July, without an agreement being reached. At its conclusion, a Trilateral Statement was issued defining the agreed principles to guide future negotiations.

== Negotiations ==
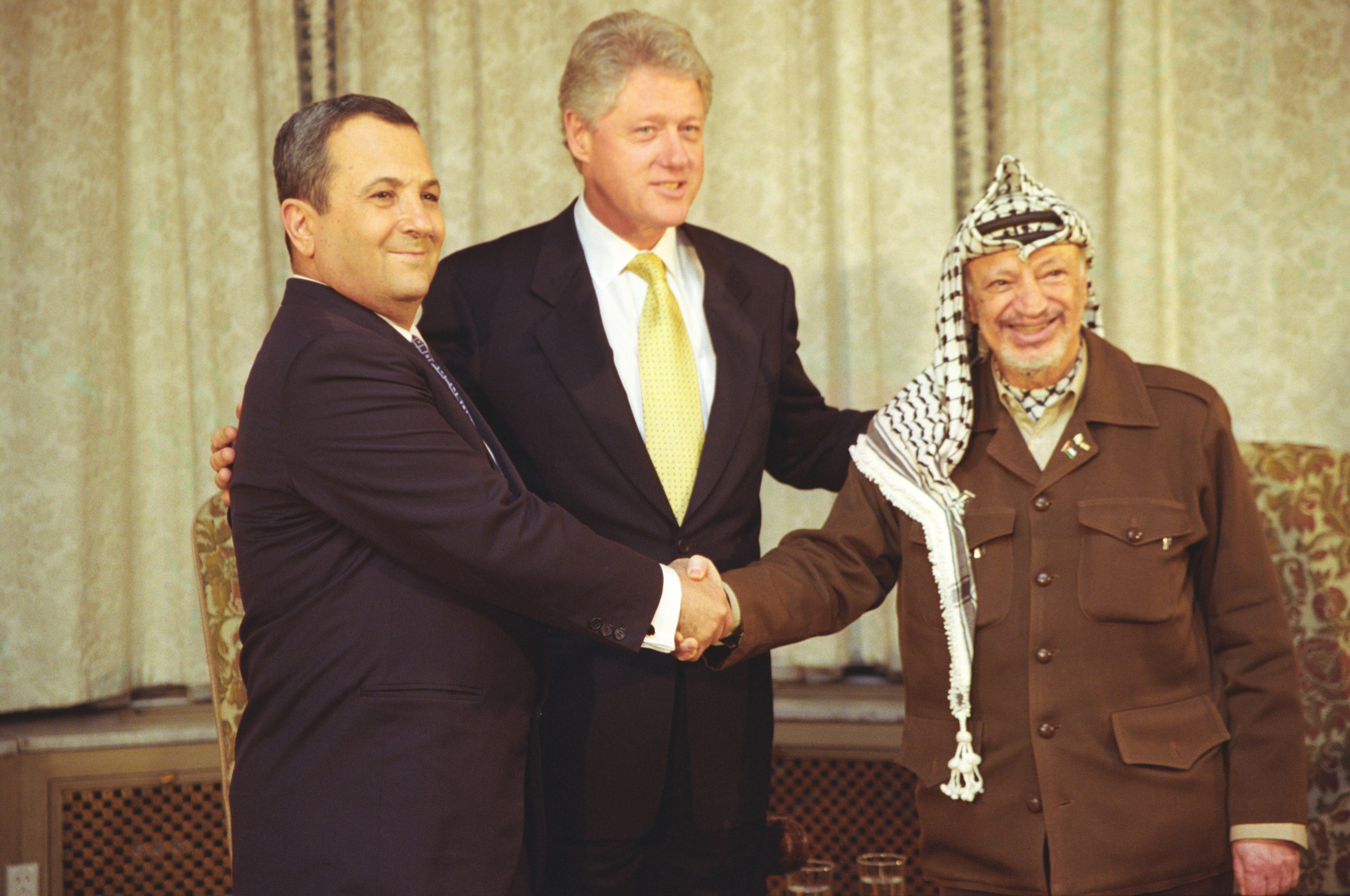
Israeli prime minister Ehud Barak and Palestinian leader Yasser Arafat shake hands at the White House in Washington.

The negotiations were based on an all-or-nothing approach, such that "nothing was considered agreed and binding until everything was agreed." The proposals were, for the most part, verbal. As no agreement was reached and there is no official written record of the proposals, some ambiguity remains over details of the positions of the parties on specific issues.

The talks ultimately failed to reach agreement on the final status issues:

- Territory
  - Territorial contiguity
- Jerusalem and the Temple Mount
- Refugees and Palestinian right of return
- Security arrangements
- Settlements

=== Territory ===
The Palestinian negotiators indicated they wanted full Palestinian sovereignty over the entire West Bank and the Gaza Strip, although they would consider a one-to-one land swap with Israel. Their historic position was that Palestinians had already made a territorial compromise with Israel by accepting Israel's right to 78% of "historic Palestine", and accepting their state on the remaining 22% of such land. This consensus was expressed by Faisal Husseini when he remarked: "There can be no compromise on the compromise". They maintained that Resolution 242 calls for full Israeli withdrawal from these territories, which were captured in the Six-Day War, as part of a final peace settlement. In the 1993 Oslo Accords the Palestinian negotiators accepted the Green Line borders (1949 armistice lines) for the West Bank but the Israelis rejected this proposal and disputed the Palestinian interpretation of Resolution 242. Israel wanted to annex the numerous settlement blocks on the Palestinian side of the Green Line, and were concerned that a complete return to the 1967 borders was dangerous to Israel's security. The Palestinian and Israeli definition of the West Bank differs by approximately 5% land area as the Israeli definition does not include East Jerusalem (71 km^{2}), the territorial waters of the Dead Sea (195 km^{2}) and the area known as No Man's Land (50 km^{2} near Latrun).

Based on the Israeli definition of the West Bank, Barak offered to form a Palestinian state initially on 73% of the West Bank (that is, 27% less than the Green Line borders) and 100% of the Gaza Strip. In 10–25 years, the Palestinian state would expand to a maximum of 92% of the West Bank (91 percent of the West Bank and 1 percent from a land swap). From the Palestinian perspective this equated to an offer of a Palestinian state on a maximum of 86% of the West Bank.

According to Robert Wright, Israel would only keep the settlements with large populations. Wright states that all others would be dismantled, with the exception of Kiryat Arba (adjacent to the holy city of Hebron), which would be an Israeli enclave inside the Palestinian state, and would be linked to Israel by a bypass road. The West Bank would be split in the middle by an Israeli-controlled road from Jerusalem to the Dead Sea, with free passage for Palestinians, although Israel reserved the right to close the road to passage in case of emergency. In return, Israel would allow the Palestinians to use a highway in the Negev to connect the West Bank with Gaza. Wright states that in the Israeli proposal, the West Bank and Gaza Strip would be linked by an elevated highway and an elevated railroad running through the Negev, ensuring safe and free passage for Palestinians. These would be under the sovereignty of Israel, and Israel reserved the right to close them to passage in case of emergency.

Israel would retain around 9% in the West Bank in exchange for 1% of land within the Green Line. The land that would be conceded included symbolic and cultural territories such as the Al-Aqsa Mosque, whereas the Israeli land conceded was unspecified. Additional to territorial concessions, Palestinian airspace would be controlled by Israel under Barak's offer. The Palestinians rejected the Halutza Sand region (78 km^{2}) alongside the Gaza Strip as part of the land swap on the basis that it was of inferior quality to that which they would have to give up in the West Bank.

=== Territorial contiguity ===
In the proposed Palestinian state, the Gaza Strip would be discontinuous from the West Bank. The degree to which the West Bank itself would be discontiguous is disputed. Noam Chomsky writes that the West Bank would have been divided into three cantons and Palestinian East Jerusalem would have constituted the fourth canton; all four cantons would be separated from one another by Israeli territory. Other sources also said that the proposed West Bank would be divided into three cantons. By contrast, Ehud Barak said the West Bank would only be divided by a wedge of Israeli territory stretching from Maale Adumim to the Jordan River, but would otherwise be continuous.

The Palestinians reacted strongly negatively to the proposed cantonization of the West Bank into three blocs, which the Palestinian delegation likened to South African Bantustans, a loaded word that was disputed by the Israeli and American negotiators. Settlement blocs, bypassed roads and annexed lands would create barriers between Nablus and Jenin with Ramallah. The Ramallah bloc would in turn be divided from Bethlehem and Hebron. A separate and smaller bloc would contain Jericho. Further, the border between West Bank and Jordan would additionally be under Israeli control. The Palestinian Authority would receive pockets of East Jerusalem which would be surrounded entirely by annexed lands in the West Bank.

=== East Jerusalem ===
One of the most significant obstacles to an agreement was the final status of Jerusalem, especially the status of Temple Mount, known to Muslims as Al-Aqsa or Haram al-Sharif. Clinton and Barak insisted that the entire area be placed under Israeli sovereignty, while Palestinians could have "custodianship". Arafat insisted on Palestinian sovereignty over the Haram. As this deadlock could not be resolved, the summit ended.

Leaders were ill-prepared for the central role the Jerusalem issue in general and the Temple Mount dispute in particular would play in the negotiations. Barak instructed his delegates to treat the dispute as "the central issue that will decide the destiny of the negotiations", whereas Arafat admonished his delegation to "not budge on this one thing: the Haram (the Temple Mount or Al-Aqsa mosque) is more precious to me than everything else." At the opening of Camp David, Barak warned the Americans he could not accept giving the Palestinians more than a purely symbolic sovereignty over any part of East Jerusalem.

The Palestinians demanded complete sovereignty over East Jerusalem and its holy sites, in particular, the Al-Aqsa Mosque and the Dome of the Rock, which are located on the Temple Mount (Haram al-Sharif), a site holy in both Islam and Judaism, and the dismantling of all Israeli neighborhoods built over the Green Line. The Palestinian position, according to Mahmoud Abbas, at that time Arafat's chief negotiator, was that: "All of East Jerusalem should be returned to Palestinian sovereignty. The Jewish Quarter and Western Wall should be placed under Israeli authority, not Israeli sovereignty. An open city and cooperation on municipal services."

Israel proposed that the Palestinians be granted "custodianship," though not sovereignty, on the Temple Mount (Haram al-Sharif), with Israel retaining control over the Western Wall, a remnant of the ancient wall that surrounded the Temple Mount, the most sacred site in Judaism outside of the Temple Mount itself. Israeli negotiators also proposed that the Palestinians be granted administration of, but not sovereignty over, the Muslim and Christian Quarters of the Old City, with the Jewish and Armenian Quarters remaining in Israeli hands. Palestinians would be granted administrative control over all Islamic and Christian holy sites, and would be allowed to raise the Palestinian flag over them. A passage linking northern Jerusalem to Islamic and Christian holy sites would be annexed by the Palestinian state. The Israeli team proposed annexing to Israeli Jerusalem settlements within the West Bank beyond the Green Line, such as Ma'ale Adumim, Givat Ze'ev, and Gush Etzion. Israel proposed that the Palestinians merge certain outer Arab villages and small cities that had been annexed to Jerusalem just after 1967 (such as Abu Dis, al-Eizariya, 'Anata, A-Ram, and eastern Sawahre) to create the city of Al-Quds, which would serve as the capital of Palestine. The historically important Arab neighborhoods such as Sheikh Jarrah, Silwan and at-Tur would remain under Israeli sovereignty, while Palestinians would only have civilian autonomy. The Palestinians would exercise civil and administrative autonomy in the outer Arab neighborhoods. Israeli neighborhoods within East Jerusalem would remain under Israeli sovereignty. The holy places in the Old City would enjoy independent religious administration. In total, Israel demanded that Palestine's territory in East Jerusalem be reduced to eight sections including six small enclaves according to Palestine's delegation to the summit.

Palestinians objected to the lack of sovereignty and to the right of Israel to keep Jewish neighborhoods that it built over the Green Line in East Jerusalem, which the Palestinians claimed block the contiguity of the Arab neighborhoods in East Jerusalem.

=== Refugees and the right of return ===
Due to the first Arab-Israeli war, a significant number of Palestinian Arabs fled or were expelled from their homes inside what is now Israel. These refugees numbered approximately 711,000 to 725,000 at the time. Today, they and their descendants number about four million, comprising about half the Palestinian people. Since that time, the Palestinians have demanded full implementation of the right of return, meaning that each refugee would be granted the option of returning to his or her home, with property restored, and receive compensation. Israelis asserted that allowing a right of return to Israel proper, rather than to the newly created Palestinian state, would mean an influx of Palestinians that would fundamentally alter the demographics of Israel, jeopardizing Israel's Jewish character and its existence as a whole.

At Camp David, the Palestinians maintained their traditional demand that the right of return be implemented. They demanded that Israel recognize the right of all refugees who so wished to settle in Israel, but to address Israel's demographic concerns, they promised that the right of return would be implemented via a mechanism agreed upon by both sides, which would try to channel a majority of refugees away from the option of returning to Israel. According to U.S. Secretary of State Madeleine Albright, some of the Palestinian negotiators were willing to privately discuss a limit on the number of refugees who would be allowed to return to Israel. Palestinians who chose to return to Israel would do so gradually, with Israel absorbing 150,000 refugees every year.

The Israeli negotiators denied that Israel was responsible for the refugee problem, and were concerned that any right of return would pose a threat to Israel's Jewish character. In the Israeli proposal, a maximum of 100,000 refugees would be allowed to return to Israel on the basis of humanitarian considerations or family reunification. All other people classified as Palestinian refugees would be settled in their present place of inhabitance, the Palestinian state, or third-party countries. Israel would help fund their resettlement and absorption. An international fund of $30 billion would be set up, which Israel would help contribute to, along with other countries, that would register claims for compensation of property lost by Palestinian refugees and make payments within the limits of its resources.

=== Israeli control over a future Palestinian state ===
The Israeli negotiators proposed that Israel be allowed to set up radar stations inside the Palestinian state, and be allowed to use its airspace. Israel also wanted the right to deploy troops on Palestinian territory in the event of an emergency, and the stationing of an international force in the Jordan Valley. Palestinian authorities would maintain control of border crossings under temporary Israeli observation. Israel would maintain a permanent security presence along 15% of the Palestinian-Jordanian border. Israel also demanded that the Palestinian state be demilitarized with the exception of its paramilitary security forces, that it would not make alliances without Israeli approval or allow the introduction of foreign forces west of the Jordan River, and that it dismantle terrorist groups. One of Israel's strongest demands was that Arafat declare the conflict over, and make no further demands. Israel also wanted water resources in the West Bank to be shared by both sides and remain under Israeli management.

== Palestinian proposal ==
According to Gilead Sher and others, Palestinians made counter-proposals of their own during the negotiations. Just like the Israeli proposals, sources differ on the details.

On territory, the Palestinian proposal gave Israel either 2.5% (according to Beinart) or 3.1% (according to Emerson and Tocci) of the West Bank. The proposal demanded any territory in occupied West Bank annexed by Israel be swapped one-to-one with territory inside Israel. Israel would have to evacuate Kiryat Arba and Hebron. A corridor between the West Bank and Gaza Strip was proposed for the movement of people and goods, via a narrow strip of Israeli land. The corridor would remain under Israeli sovereignty.

On Jerusalem, the Palestinians propose Israeli sovereignty over the Jewish neighborhoods of East Jerusalem and Palestinian sovereignty over the Arab neighborhoods. In the Old City of Jerusalem, Israel would get the Jewish Quarter and parts of the Armenian Quarter, while Palestine would get the Muslim Quarter and the Christian Quarter. Israel would get the Western Wall, while Palestinians would get the Temple Mount/Al-Aqsa Mosque. The Palestinians proposed that instead of setting up border checkpoints inside Jerusalem, the border checkpoints should be set around the city. This meant Palestinians wishing to enter their own capital city would be treated as crossing an international border (and same with Israelis entering their capital). But once inside the city, citizens and traffic would be free to move around. If this was not acceptable to Israel, the Palestinian alternate proposal was to have a "hard border" between Israeli and Palestinian parts of Jerusalem.

On security, the Palestinian proposal allowed for an international military force (including Americans but not including Israelis) to control the Palestinian state's border with Jordan. The State of Palestine would also coordinate with Israel for the Israeli Airforce to use the Palestinian airspace.

On refugees, Palestinian insisted on the Right of Return but the proposal would, according to Robert Malley, respect the "preservation of Israel's demographic balance between Jews and Arabs". Under the Palestinian proposal mechanisms would be created to make it more attractive for refugees to choose to settle any other place beside Israel. Erekat proposed that the return of Palestinian refugees from Lebanon serve as a "pilot" program to see whether refugees choose to return to Israel or go somewhere else. In this pilot program, Israel would admit 2,000 refugees per year over a 5-6 year period under the framework of family reunification.

== Final Israeli proposal to the Palestinians ==
The proposals made to the Palestinians were never put into writing, but told orally to Palestinian negotiators. There are conflicting accounts as to what transpired. The following table summarizes what was finally offered to Palestinians, according to various sources. Most sources agree, that under Israel's final proposal, the Temple Mount (including Al-Aqsa) would remain under Israeli sovereignty. Israel would also take most of the rest of East Jerusalem, while Palestinians would get some parts too. Israel would annex 8% or 13.5% of the West Bank, and would maintain a military of an additional 6–12% of the West Bank for an unspecified period of time (sometimes called a "long term lease"). According to some sources, Israel would also retain its settlement blocks in the Gaza Strip. The Palestinian state would not be contiguous and the West Bank would be split into 2 or 3 sections. Finally, Israel would control Palestinian airspace.

Israeli source
Palestinian source

Sources give a variety of versions of what was proposed to the Palestinians at Camp David
Source	Map link	Temple Mount (including Al-Aqsa Mosque)	Rest of Old City	Rest of Jerusalem	Rest of West Bank	West Bank contiguity	Gaza Strip	Comment
PASSIA		Under Israeli sovereignty		Israel gets an expanded "Greater Jerusalem", Palestinians get a few pockets	Israel annexes 10–13.5% of the West Bank and maintain control over 8.5-12% for an unspecified interim period	Split into 3 sections	Mostly under Palestinian sovereignty, but Israel retains 3 settlement blocks	
Ehud Barak		Under Israeli sovereignty, but Palestinians offered "custodianship"	Palestinian sovereignty over 2 Quarters (Muslim and Christian)	Some Arab neighborhoods under Palestinian sovereignty; other Arab neighborhoods under Israeli sovereignty but given "functional autonomy"	Israel annexes 8% of the West Bank, with unspecified land swaps	Split into 2 sections (by a piece of Israeli territory running from Maale Adumim to Jordan river)	Under Palestinian sovereignty	
Robert Malley		Under Israeli sovereignty, ambiguous Palestinian "custodianship"	Palestinian sovereignty over 2 Quarters (Muslim and Christian)	Some neighborhoods under Palestinian sovereignty, others under "functional autonomy"	Israel annexes 9% of the West Bank, Palestinians given 1% of unspecified Israeli land in land swap			Proposals lacked critical details
Clayton Swisher		Under Israeli sovereignty, but Palestinians given "custody" of Al-Aqsa mosque	First option: Palestinian sovereignty over 2 Quarters (Muslim and Christian)	First option: Palestinians don't get sovereignty in neighborhoods, only "functional autonomy"	Israel annexes 8.8% of the West Bank; an additional 13.3% is under Palestinian sovereignty but Israeli occupation (where it maintains military bases)	Split into 3 noncontiguous sections		Israel controls Palestinian airspace and radio and cellular signals
Clayton Swisher		Under Israeli sovereignty, but Palestinians given "custody" of Al-Aqsa mosque	Second option: All 4 Quarters under Israeli sovereignty, but 2 Quarters (Muslim and Christian) offered Palestinian autonomy.	Second option: Palestinians get sovereignty in some neighborhoods	Israel annexes 8.8% of the West Bank; an additional 13.3% is under Palestinian sovereignty but Israeli occupation (where it maintains military bases)	Split into 3 noncontiguous sections		Israel controls Palestinian airspace and radio and cellular signals
Shaul Arieli, ECF (Israeli think-tank)		Under Israeli sovereignty	Israel gets Muslim neighborhoods of the Old City	Palestine gets some Muslim neighborhoods in East Jerusalem that are outside the Old City	Israel annexes 13% of the West Bank and takes another 6% on "Long term lease". No land swaps.		Under Palestinian sovereignty	
Dennis Ross					Israel annexes 9% of the West Bank and controls 15% of West Bank's border			
Article in Maariv		Under Israeli sovereignty, but Palestinians would have "religious autonomy"	All 4 Quarters under Israeli sovereignty, but 2 Quarters (Muslim and Christian) offered autonomy.	Some Arab neighborhoods annexed by Israel, others annexed by Palestine				
Howard Friel		Israeli sovereignty			Israel annexes either 13% or 9% of the West Bank without one-to-one land swaps			

== Aftermath ==
In mid-October, Clinton and the parties held a summit in Sharm El Sheikh, resulting in a "Sharm memorandum" with understandings aimed at ending the violence and renewing security cooperation. From 18 to 23 December they held negotiations, followed by Clinton's presentation of his "parameters", in a last attempt to achieve peace in the Middle East before his second term ended in January 2001. Although the official statements stated that both parties had accepted the Clinton Parameters with reservations, these reservations in fact meant that the parties had rejected the parameters on certain essential points. On 2 January 2001, the Palestinians put forward their acceptance with some fundamental objections. Barak accepted the parameters with a 20-page letter of reservations. A Sharm el-Sheikh summit planned for 28 December did not take place.

Clinton's initiative led to the Taba negotiations in January 2001, where the two sides published a statement saying they had never been closer to agreement (though such issues as Jerusalem, the status of Gaza, and the Palestinian demand for compensation for refugees and their descendants remained unresolved), but Barak, facing elections, re-suspended the talks. Ehud Barak was to be defeated by Ariel Sharon in 2001.

Clinton has maintained his disappointment over the failure of the summit to reach a deal. Shortly after the conclusion of his presidency, Clinton assigned the blame for the failure of the 2000 Camp David Summit squarely on Yasser Arafat and the Palestinians. When Arafat called Clinton a great man, Clinton responded, "The hell I am. I'm a colossal failure, and you made me one," explaining that Arafat rejected "the best peace deal he was ever going to get" by then Israeli Prime Minister Ehud Barak. In a 2024 podcast, Clinton reaffirmed his feelings on the matter, saying he was "really mad" at Arafat and calling the failure to make a deal "truly heartbreaking."

== Responsibility for failure ==
Which party (parties) should be blamed for the lack of success of the Summit is hotly debated. In a 2005 book published by Heribert Adam and Kogila Moodley, the authors state "Informed observer blamed all three parties' negotiation strategies for the failure", referring to the Israelis, Palestinians, and Americans. Nevertheless, after the summit, most of the Israeli and American establishment bought into the Israeli narrative, in which Arafat was portrayed as a villain. Although it was the question of Jerusalem that dominated the discussions and the Palestinian refugee issue didn't occupy much attention, Israeli leaders instead said that the refugee question led to the collapse of the negotiations. The Israeli argument was that the Palestinian right of return meant the end of Israel as a Jewish state, hence it was the Palestinians who didn't want peace. This narrative led to the decline of the Israeli peace movement.

Under the Israeli narrative, a Palestinian state in 91% of the West Bank and Gaza was considered "generous" and Palestinians were portrayed as stubborn for not accepting it. In the Palestinian view, such a proposal was contrary to Resolution 242. In their view, the Palestinians had already compromised by conceding 78% of historic Palestine to Israel and accepting a Palestinian state in only 22% of the land and thus should not be expected to concede even more land to Israel. Palestinians also saw Israeli proposals to control Palestinian airspace, borders and natural resources as an attempt to maintain the occupation indefinitely.

=== Accusations of Palestinian responsibility ===
Most of the Israeli and American criticism for the failure of the 2000 Camp David Summit was leveled at Arafat. Ehud Barak portrays Arafat's behavior at Camp David as a "performance geared to exact as many Israeli concessions as possible without ever seriously intending to reach a peace settlement or sign an "end to the conflict".

Clinton blamed Arafat after the failure of the talks, stating, "I regret that in 2000 Arafat missed the opportunity to bring that nation into being and pray for the day when the dreams of the Palestinian people for a state and a better life will be realized in a just and lasting peace." The failure to come to an agreement was widely attributed to Yasser Arafat, as he walked away from the table without making a concrete counter-offer and because Arafat did little to quell the series of Palestinian riots that began shortly after the summit. Arafat was also accused of scuttling the talks by Nabil Amr, a former minister in the Palestinian Authority. In My Life, Clinton wrote that Arafat once complimented Clinton by telling him, "You are a great man." Clinton responded, "I am not a great man. I am a failure, and you made me one."

Dennis Ross, the US Middle East envoy and a key negotiator at the summit, summarized his perspectives in his book The Missing Peace. During a lecture in Australia, Ross suggested that the reason for the failure was Arafat's unwillingness to sign a final deal with Israel that would close the door on any of the Palestinians' maximum demands, particularly the right of return. Ross claimed that what Arafat really wanted was "a one-state solution. Not independent, adjacent Israeli and Palestinian states, but a single Arab state encompassing all of Historic Palestine". Ross also quoted Saudi Prince Bandar as saying while negotiations were taking place: "If Arafat does not accept what is available now, it won't be a tragedy; it will be a crime."

In his book, The Oslo Syndrome, Harvard Medical School professor of psychiatry and historian Kenneth Levin summarized the failure of the 2000 Camp David Summit in this manner: "despite the dimensions of the Israeli offer and intense pressure from President Clinton, Arafat demurred. He apparently was indeed unwilling, no matter what the Israeli concessions, to sign an agreement that declared itself final and forswore any further Palestinian claims." Levin argues that both the Israelis and the Americans were naive in expecting that Arafat would agree to give up the idea of a literal "right of return" for all Palestinians into Israel proper no matter how many 1948 refugees or how much monetary compensation Israel offered.

Alan Dershowitz, an Israel advocate and law professor at Harvard University, said that the failure of the negotiations was due to "the refusal of the Palestinians and Arafat to give up the right of return. That was the sticking point. It wasn't Jerusalem. It wasn't borders. It was the right of return." He claimed that President Clinton told this to him "directly and personally."

=== Accusations of Israeli and American responsibility ===
Robert Malley, part of the Clinton administration and present at the summit, wrote to dispel three "myths" regarding the summit's failure. First myth, Malley says, was "Camp David was an ideal test of Mr. Arafat's intentions". Malley recalls that Arafat didn't think that Israeli and Palestinian diplomats had sufficiently narrowed issues in preparation for the summit and that the Summit happened at a "low point" in the relations between Arafat and Barak. The second myth was "Israel's offer met most if not all of the Palestinians' legitimate aspirations". According to Malley, Arafat was told that Israel would not only retain sovereignty over some Arab neighborhoods of Jerusalem, but Haram al Sharif too, and Arafat was also asked to accept an unfavorable 9-to-1 ratio in land swaps. The third myth was that "The Palestinians made no concession of their own". Malley pointed out that the Palestinians starting position was at the 1967 borders, but they were ready to give up Jewish neighborhoods in East Jerusalem, and parts of the West Bank with Israeli settlements. Further, the Palestinians were willing to implement the right of return in a way that guaranteed Israel's demographic interests. He argues that Arafat was far more compromising in his negotiations with Israel than Anwar el-Sadat or King Hussein of Jordan had been when they negotiated with Israel.

Clayton Swisher wrote a rebuttal to Clinton and Ross's accounts about the causes for the breakdown of the Camp David Summit in his 2004 book, The Truth About Camp David. Swisher, the Director of Programs at the Middle East Institute, concluded that the Israelis and the Americans were at least as guilty as the Palestinians for the collapse. M. J. Rosenberg praised the book: "Clayton Swisher's The Truth About Camp David, based on interviews with [US negotiators] Martin Indyk, Dennis Ross and Aaron David Miller himself provides a comprehensive and acute account – the best we're likely to see – on the [one-sided diplomacy] Miller describes."

Shlomo Ben-Ami, then Israel's Minister of Foreign Relations who participated in the talks, stated that the Palestinians wanted the immediate withdrawal of the Israelis from the West Bank, Gaza Strip and East Jerusalem, and only subsequently the Palestinian Authority would dismantle the Palestinian organizations. The Israeli response was "we can't accept the demand for a return to the borders of June 1967 as a pre-condition for the negotiation." In 2006, Shlomo Ben-Ami stated on Democracy Now! that "Camp David was not the missed opportunity for the Palestinians, and if I were a Palestinian I would have rejected Camp David, as well. This is something I put in the book. But Taba is the problem. The Clinton parameters are the problem" referring to his 2001 book Scars of War, Wounds of Peace: The Israeli-Arab Tragedy.

Norman Finkelstein published an article in the winter 2007 issue of Journal of Palestine Studies, excerpting from his longer essay called Subordinating Palestinian Rights to Israeli "Needs". The abstract for the article states: "In particular, it examines the assumptions informing Ross’s account of what happened during the negotiations and why, and the distortions that spring from these assumptions. Judged from the perspective of Palestinians' and Israelis' respective rights under international law, all the concessions at Camp David came from the Palestinian side, none from the Israeli side."

Ron Hassner, a political science professor at the University of California, Berkeley, has argued that it was the failure of participants at the negotiations to include religious leaders in the process or even consult with religious experts prior to the negotiations, that led to the collapse of the negotiations over the subject of Jerusalem: "Both parties seem to have assumed that the religious dimensions of the dispute could be ignored. As a result, neither party had prepared seriously for the possibility that the Temple Mount issue would come to stand at the heart of the negotiations." Political Scientist Menahem Klein, who advised the Israeli government during the negotiations, confirmed that "The professional back channels did not sufficiently treat Jerusalem as a religious city... It was easier to conduct discussions about preservation of historical structures in the old city than to discuss the link between the political sanctity and the religious sanctity at the historical and religious heart of the city."

The Israeli group Gush Shalom stated that "the offer is a pretense of generosity for the benefit of the media", and included detailed maps of what the offer specifically entailed. Among Gush Shalom's concerns with Barak's offer were Barak's demand to annex large settlement blocs (9% of the West Bank), lack of trust in the commitment and/or ability of the Israeli government to evacuate the thousands of non-bloc Israeli settlers in the 15-year timeline, and limited sovereignty for Palestinians in Jerusalem.

== Public opinion towards the summit ==
The Palestinian public was supportive of Arafat's role in the negotiations. After the summit, Arafat's approval rating increased seven percentage points from 39 to 46%. Overall, 68% of the Palestinian public thought Arafat's positions on a final agreement at Camp David were just right and 14% thought Arafat compromised too much while only 6% thought Arafat had not compromised enough. However, when asked about specific positions Arafat had taken during the negotiations, Palestinians were more critical.

Barak did not fare as well in public opinion polls. Only 25% of the Israeli public thought his positions on Camp David were just right as opposed to 58% of the public that thought Barak compromised too much. A majority of Israelis were opposed to Barak's position on every issue discussed at Camp David except for security.

== Concluding Trilateral statement (full text) ==
25 July 2000

President William J. Clinton
Israeli Prime Minister Ehud Barak
Palestinian Authority Chairman Yasser Arafat

Between 11 and 24 July, under the auspices of President Clinton, Prime Minister Barak and Chairman Arafat met at Camp David in an effort to reach an agreement on permanent status. While they were not able to bridge the gaps and reach an agreement, their negotiations were unprecedented in both scope and detail. Building on the progress achieved at Camp David, the two leaders agreed on the following principles to guide their negotiations:

1. The two sides agreed that the aim of their negotiations is to put an end to decades of conflict and achieve a just and lasting peace.
2. The two sides commit themselves to continue their efforts to conclude an agreement on all permanent status issues as soon as possible.
3. Both sides agree that negotiations based on UN Security Council Resolutions 242 and 338 are the only way to achieve such an agreement and they undertake to create an environment for negotiations free from pressure, intimidation and threats of violence.
4. The two sides understand the importance of avoiding unilateral actions that prejudge the outcome of negotiations and that their differences will be resolved only by good faith negotiations.
5. Both sides agree that the United States remains a vital partner in the search for peace and will continue to consult closely with President Clinton and Secretary Albright in the period ahead.

== See also ==
- Mitchell Report (Arab–Israeli conflict)
- History of the State of Palestine

== Bibliography ==
- Peters, Joel (2013). The Routledge handbook on the Israeli-Palestinian conflict. London New York: Routledge. ISBN 9780415778626.
- Ehud Barak. Statement by Prime Minister Barak at Press Conference upon the Conclusion of the Camp David Summit
- Shlomo Ben-Ami. Camp David Diaries. Excerpts from a 6 April 2001 article in Ma'ariv
- Gilead Sher (2006). The Israeli-Palestinian Peace Negotiations, 1999–2001. Routledge. A first hand account from the chief negotiator for the Israeli team
- Mahmoud Abbas, Reports of the Camp David Summit, 9 September 2000 Excerpts published in the Journal of Palestine Studies, vol. XXX, No. 2 (Winter 2001), pp. 168–170
- Akram Haniyah, The Camp David Papers, first hand account by a member of the Palestinian negotiating team, originally published in the Palestinian daily al-Ayyam. English translation in Journal of Palestine Studies, vol. XXX, No. 2 (Winter 2001), pp. 75–97
- Madeleine Albright (2003). Madam Secretary: A Memoir. New York: Hyperion (especially chapter 28)
- Bill Clinton, My Life: The Presidential Years (especially chapter 25)
- Dennis Ross The Missing Peace : The Inside Story of the Fight for Middle East Peace
- Kenneth Levin. The Oslo Syndrome: Delusions of a People Under Siege. Hanover: Smith and Kraus, 2005.
