= The Missing Peace =

The Missing Peace may refer to:

- The Missing Peace (book), a 2004 non-fiction book by Dennis Ross
- The Missing Peace (album), a 2017 album by L.A. Guns

== See also ==
- The Missing Piece (disambiguation)
