= Gilead Sher =

Israeli attorney (born 1953)

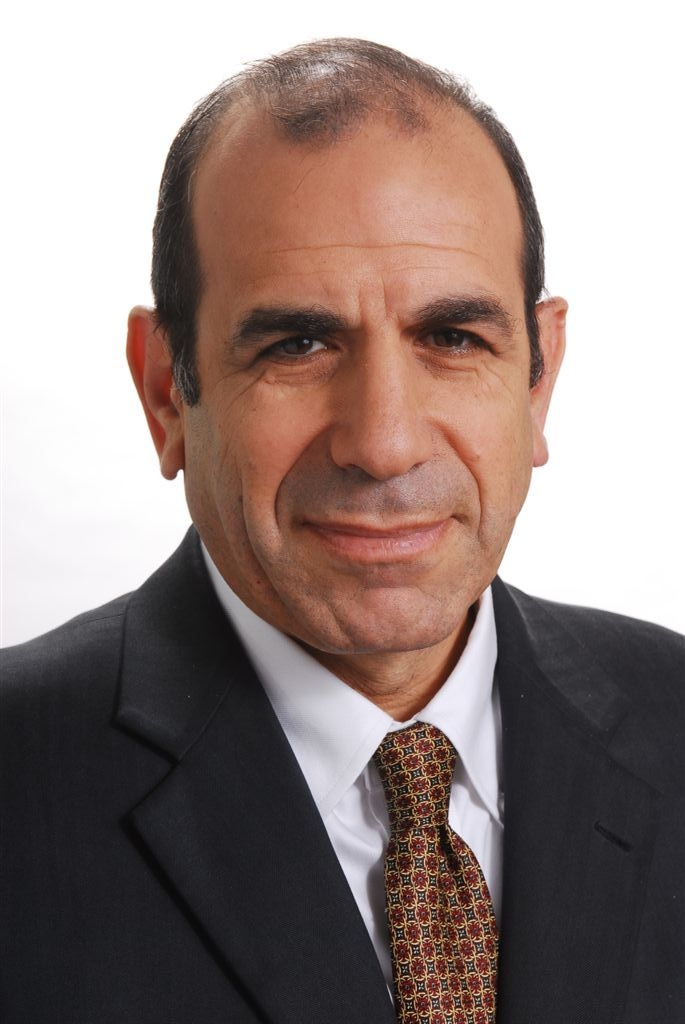
- Born: 2 June 1953 (age 73); Mahanayim, Israel
- Education: Hebrew University of Jerusalem
- Occupations: Attorney, Author, Researcher
- Known for: Peace negotiator at Camp David, Taba, Sharm el-Sheikh
- Spouse: Ruth
- Children: 4

Gilead Sher (Hebrew: גלעד שר; born 2 June 1953) is an Israeli attorney who served as Chief of Staff and Policy Coordinator to Israel's former Prime Minister and Minister of Defense, Ehud Barak. In that capacity he acted as one of Israel's senior peace negotiator in 1999–2001, at the Camp David summit in 2000 and the Taba talks in 2001, as well as in extensive rounds of covert negotiations with the Palestinians.

== Early life and education ==
Sher was born on 2 June 1953 in Kibbutz Mahanayim, Israel. Sher, on his mother's side, is a descendant of the Sephardic Baruch Mizrachi family, which has resided in Jerusalem since 1620. On his father's side, Sher's grandfather, Avraham Sher (Ser) was killed in action as an Haganah combatant in the 1948 Arab–Israeli War in 1947 and his father Yoel Sher was an Israeli diplomat and ambassador. Sher is a graduate of the Hebrew University Law School and was admitted to the Israel Bar Association in 1981. He has also completed courses in project finance at the World Bank (1996) and at Harvard University (1999) as well as Battalion Commanders and Brigade Commanders courses in the Israel Defense Forces.

== Career ==
Alongside his law practice, Sher leads the Center for Applied Negotiations (CAN) at the Institute for National Security Studies (INSS) in Tel Aviv, ranked among the five leading think tanks in the Middle East, which he joined in 2012 as a senior research fellow.

Sher started his career as a news editor and radio news presenter for Kol Yisrael, where he subsequently served as a parliamentary and legal correspondent, and was the radio's correspondent in Paris from 1981 to 1983.

Sher founded the law firm Gilead Sher, Talhami & Co. in 1989. The firm has offices in both Tel Aviv and Jerusalem. Between 2005 and 2010, as a result of a merger, Sher became a senior founding partner at Aaronsohn, Sher, Aboulafia, Amoday and Co., which was ranked amongst Israel's 20 largest law firms. His main fields of expertise are corporate law, project finance, constitutional and administrative law, international business ventures, investments and transactions, dispute resolution and both private and public international law.

=== Academic career ===
From 2001 to 2011, Sher taught annually as a guest lecturer at the Wharton School of the University of Pennsylvania. His lectures focused on dispute resolution and negotiations in times of crisis. In 2007-2013 Sher also taught at the Tel Aviv University as an adjunct professor, delivering seminars at the international and local M.A. programs in conflict resolution and mediation.

== Peace process ==
Sher's involvement in Middle East peace efforts started during the tenure of the late Prime Minister Yitzhak Rabin, when as a reserve IDF colonel he was appointed to the negotiation project at the Planning Directorate of the IDF and served as delegate to the talks on the Oslo Accords. He was later appointed by Israel's Prime Minister and Minister of Defense Ehud Barak in 1999 to negotiate the Sharm el-Sheikh Memorandum which was signed on 4 September 1999 between Israel and the PLO. He was subsequently appointed head of the negotiation team at the Camp David peace summit which was convened by former US President Bill Clinton.

Sher also served as a co-chief peace negotiator at the Taba peace talks of 2001, as well as in extensive rounds of covert peace negotiations with the Palestinians. Sher's efforts for peace were recognized by former US President Clinton who thanked him for his "heavy labor for a different future for your people and your neighbors". Sher was appointed Chevalier de l'Ordre national du Merite in 2002 by the former president of France, Jacques Chirac, as appreciation for his efforts to promote peace in the Middle East.

Sher gives an account of his involvement in the peace process in his book The Israeli-Palestinian Peace Negotiations 1999–2001, Within Reach which was published in Hebrew in 2001, translated into Arabic and published in English by Routledge/Taylor & Francis Group in 2006.

=== Government ===
Sher served as Chief of Staff of the Prime Minister and the Minister of Defense and was the PM's policy coordinator from 2000 to 2001.
