= Settlement blocs =

Israeli settlement clusters

Settlement blocs (sometimes referred to as consensus settlements) is term used to refer to Israeli settlements and the territory around them considered candidates to be retained by Israel in any peace agreement. The exact extent of these blocs has never been defined or agreed upon.

== Origin and development of the term ==
Usage is found in peace negotiations at Camp David in July 2000 and subsequently in The Clinton Parameters.

According to a 2001 Foundation for Middle East Peace report, Israel's Final Status Map at Taba, is both "conceptually and territorially reminiscent of" the 1995 Beilin–Abu Mazen agreement that established a Palestinian willingness to consider trading settlement blocs for equivalent Israeli land.

Palestinian leaders have accepted the principle of swaps although neither they nor the United States have ever agreed on a delineation of the blocs.

== 2000 and 2001 ==
Starting with Camp David, Palestinians agreed (while differing on the size and location of swaps) Israel could annex some settlement blocs (including Ariel in the north, some parts of the Latrun salient, and the Etzion bloc near Bethlehem) as well as Israeli/Jewish settlements established in East Jerusalem since 1967 such as Gilo, Neve Ya'acov, and Pisgat Ze'ev. At Camp David, Israel offered to establish a sovereign Palestinian state encompassing the Gaza Strip, 92 percent of the West Bank (91 percent of the West Bank plus the equivalent of 1 percent of the West Bank in land from pre-1967 Israel), and some parts of Arab East Jerusalem. The Palestinians used a total area of 5,854 square kilometers whereas Israel excluded the area known as No Man's Land (50 km^{2} near Latrun), post-1967 East Jerusalem (71 km^{2}), and the territorial waters of the Dead Sea (195 km^{2}) giving 5,538 km^{2}. So 91% of 5,538 km^{2} of the West Bank translated into 86% from the Palestinian standpoint.

== 2003 ==
The Geneva initiative includes land swaps of 2.2 percent, with the settlement blocs of Gush Etzion (excluding Efrat), Ma’aleh Adumim (excluding "E1"), Modi’in Ilit and Givat Ze’ev becoming part of Israel.

== 2008 ==
As part of the Annapolis plan, Olmert proposed annexing all the major settlement blocs (about 5.9 percent of the West Bank territory), in exchange for 5.2 percent of Israeli territory whereas Abbas proposed giving Israel 1.6 percent of the West Bank in exchange for 2 percent of Israeli territory. Abbas did not include Ma’aleh Adumim or Givat Ze’ev but did agree to Modi’in Ilit and Gush Etzion (excluding Efrat). Alan Dowty makes use of the Palestine Papers to refer to a "Summary of Olmert's Package Offer to Abu Mazen" of August 31, 2008, based on information provided by Palestinian spokesperson Saeb Erekat, to describe an offer whereby Israel would annex 6.8% (calculated excluding No Man's Land and East Jerusalem and including Gush Etzion (with Efrat), Ma'ale Adumim, Givat Ze'ev and Ariel as well all settlements in East Jerusalem) in exchange for 5.5% of Israeli territory.

== 2015 ==
Meeting with EU foreign policy chief Federica Mogherini, Netanyahu voices willingness for the first time since taking office to discuss size of settlement blocs and their borders with Palestinians. In a report using data through 2015, Haaretz, without specifying how it had defined settlement blocs, gave the total number of settlers in blocs in the West Bank (excluding East Jerusalem) as 214,459 (56% of 382,916) located in 19 (of 125) settlements (excluding outposts).

== 2017 ==
The "Greater Jerusalem" law was introduced in 2016 and intended to include (but not annex) five settlement blocks (Ma’aleh Adumim, Gush Etzion, Efrat, Beitar Illit and Givat Ze’ev, 19 settlements), about 150,000 settlers, within Jerusalem's municipal jurisdiction. International pressure, mainly from the United States, resulted in the draft bill being withdrawn from consideration in October, 2017.

== 2019 ==
Speaking at a public conference on December 8, 2019, Netanyahu said:

I think the time has come to extend Israeli sovereignty over the Jordan Valley, and also arrange the status of all the settlements in Judea and Samaria, those inside the settlement blocks, and those that are not in the blocs. They will be part of the state of Israel.
