= The Missing Piece =

The Missing Piece may refer to:

- The Missing Piece (book), a children's book by Shel Silverstein
- The Missing Piece (film), a 2015 Taiwanese film
- The Missing Piece (album), a 1977 album by Gentle Giant
- The Missing Piece, a 2005 album by Twins
- "The Missing Piece" (song), a 2021 song by Paul Rey
- "The Missing Piece", a 2000 song by Faraquet from The View from this Tower

== See also ==
- The Missing Peace (disambiguation)
- "Missing Piece", a 2021 song by Vance Joy
- Missing Pieces (disambiguation)
