= Simon Malley =

Syrian Egyptian francophone journalist

- Born: May 25, 1923; Cairo, Egypt
- Died: September 7, 2006 (aged 83); Paris, France
- Occupation: Journalist

Simon Malley (Arabic: سيمون مالى, Sīmūn Mālī) (May 25, 1923 – September 7, 2006), was a prominent Syrian Egyptian trilingual journalist and a strong supporter of Third World independence movements.

According to his obituary in The Guardian, Malley was "one of the best known francophone journalists of his generation"; calling him a partisan, fearless, and controversial writer, they noted how Malley spoke and wrote, just as easily in French or English, as in his native Arabic.

== Life and career ==
Simon Malley was born in Cairo into a Syrian Jewish family of modest circumstances. After graduating from high school, he joined the Egyptian Communist Party, became a journalist and was sent by an Egyptian newspaper to cover the United Nations. In New York City, he met his wife, Barbara, an American, when she worked for the United Nations delegation of the National Liberation Front (FLN), the Algerian independence group. Malley took up the cause of the FLN and was important in publicizing its cause.

Malley supported Gamal Abdul Nasser's revolution in Egypt in 1952, and Nasser made him the representative of the Egyptian daily newspaper Al Gomhuria in New York City. The Jewish-born Malley was critical of Israel.

He moved to France in 1969, where he founded the journal "Africasia" (its name was changed to "Afrique Asie" later on; he also began a second magazine called L'Economiste du Tiers Monde and also then edited an English version which was called Africasia) and was led by his wife, Barbara Malley . The journal published reports from Third World areas which received relatively little coverage elsewhere. Its contributors included Third World economists and academics.

Malley became the "best known voice" of Third World anti-colonialist movements. He conducted a 20-hour interview with Fidel Castro, and long interviews with Yasser Arafat, and Oliver Tambo. "At Non-Aligned Movement meetings other journalists had press passes; he had a delegate's pass", according to his obituary in The Guardian.One of the Third World movements that the magazine was friendly toward was the Palestine Liberation Organization.

Afrique Asie became a longtime critic of the regimes of King Hassan II of Morocco and Mobutu Sese Seko in Zaire, among others. Malley was a strong critic of French foreign policy and alleged intelligence activities in Africa. In October 1980, at the end of the administration of French President Valéry Giscard d'Estaing, French special services police pulled Malley from a taxi and put him on a plane to New York City without his passport. In the airport at New York, an airline employee helped him avoid customs in order to take another flight, and he spent eight months in Geneva, Switzerland editing his journal until the election of President François Mitterrand, then returned to France with the assent of the new administration.

== Family ==
Simon and Barbara had three children: Nadia, Robert Malley, and Richard. Robert was a national security advisor in the Clinton administration and foreign policy advisor in the Barack Obama presidential campaign. Robert Malley wrote about Third Worldism and its decline in his book, The Call From Algeria: Third Worldism, Revolution, and the Turn to Islam, described in a Times Literary Supplement review as "a personal perspective on the movement in which his father played a notable part, and an epitaph of sorts."

== See also ==
- Third-worldism
