= The Missing Peace (book) =

2004 book by Dennis Ross

The Missing Peace: The Inside Story of the Fight for Middle East Peace
- Author: Dennis Ross
- Language: English
- Genre: Non-fiction
- Publisher: Farrar, Straus and Giroux
- Publication date: 2004
- Publication place: United States
- Media type: Print
- Pages: 872 pp
- ISBN: 0-374-19973-6
- OCLC: 53971629
- Dewey Decimal: 956.05/3 22
- LC Class: DS119.76 .R68 2004

The Missing Peace: The Inside Story of the Fight for Middle East Peace (ISBN 0-374-19973-6) is a 2004 non-fiction book by Dennis Ross on the history of and his participation in the Israeli–Palestinian peace process and the Arab–Israeli peace process. Ross, an American diplomat, was the Director of Policy Planning in the State Department under President George H. W. Bush and the special Middle East coordinator under President Bill Clinton.

== Summary ==
After beginning with an anecdote of Yasser Arafat coming to see President Clinton just days before the end of Clinton's second term in office, Ross returns to the period of the British Mandate and continues through the 1980s, giving a brief history of the Israeli–Palestinian conflict and its roots. His own involvement begins in the run-up to the Gulf War and the 1991 Madrid Conference. The book then covers the negotiations between Israeli Prime Minister Yitzhak Rabin and Syrian President Hafez al-Assad, as well as the emergence of the 1993 Oslo Accords. Ross then moves on to the 1994 Israel–Jordan peace treaty, the 1995 Interim Agreement, and the November 1995 assassination of Yitzhak Rabin. He proceeds to the diplomatic fallout from the assassination to the election of Benjamin Netanyahu as prime minister, followed by several chapters dedicated to the negotiations on the 1997 Hebron Agreement. One year later, Netanyahu and Arafat agreed on the Wye River Memorandum. In 1998 Ehud Barak succeeded Netanyahu as prime minister and placed a priority on negotiations with Syria. After recounting the fall of that deal, Ross moves on to the 2000 Camp David Summit, and from that to the outbreak of the Second Intifada and the Taba Summit in January 2001.

== Reception ==
A New York Times review by Ethan Bronner called it an "important, voluminous and keenly balanced memoir," though "as important as this work is to history. ... It is overly long and frequently dull." Samuel W. Lewis reviewed the book for Foreign Affairs, praised it as "a major contribution to the diplomatic history of the twentieth century" that described the Arab–Israeli negotiations in "exquisite detail", but added that it was not a page-turner. In The Washington Post, Glenn Frankel found the history "an epic and tragic tale" that offered revealing profiles of a multitude of Arab and Israeli leaders. Both exhaustive and exhausting, Frankel stated that the book "sometimes reads like a working manual for diplomats." The Economist, while also warning that it was not light reading and that it inevitably contained an unhappy ending, concluded that "Mr Ross's [book] is the one for the historians."

Commentary published a critical review by Hillel Halkin remarking, "[i]t is possible not to see the forest for the trees. It is even possible, by seeing only the trees, to forget that the forest exists. This is true of Dennis Ross's The Missing Peace." The Nation called the book a "comprehensive and fascinating memoir" but also stated that "The Missing Peace raises serious questions about the soundness of the Israel-first school of which Dennis Ross is a prominent member."

Former professor Norman G. Finkelstein wrote a rebuttal to The Missing Peace in the Journal of Palestine Studies. He stated that "where Ross's allegedly verbatim account of the actual negotiations can be crosschecked, it proves misleading". He also argued that "Israeli needs, in Ross's calculus, systematically trump Palestinian rights" and that Ross engaged in a "wholesale dismissal of Palestinian needs".

== See also ==
- My Life, which covers the same events from President Clinton's view
