= Dennis Ross =

American diplomat and author (born 1948)

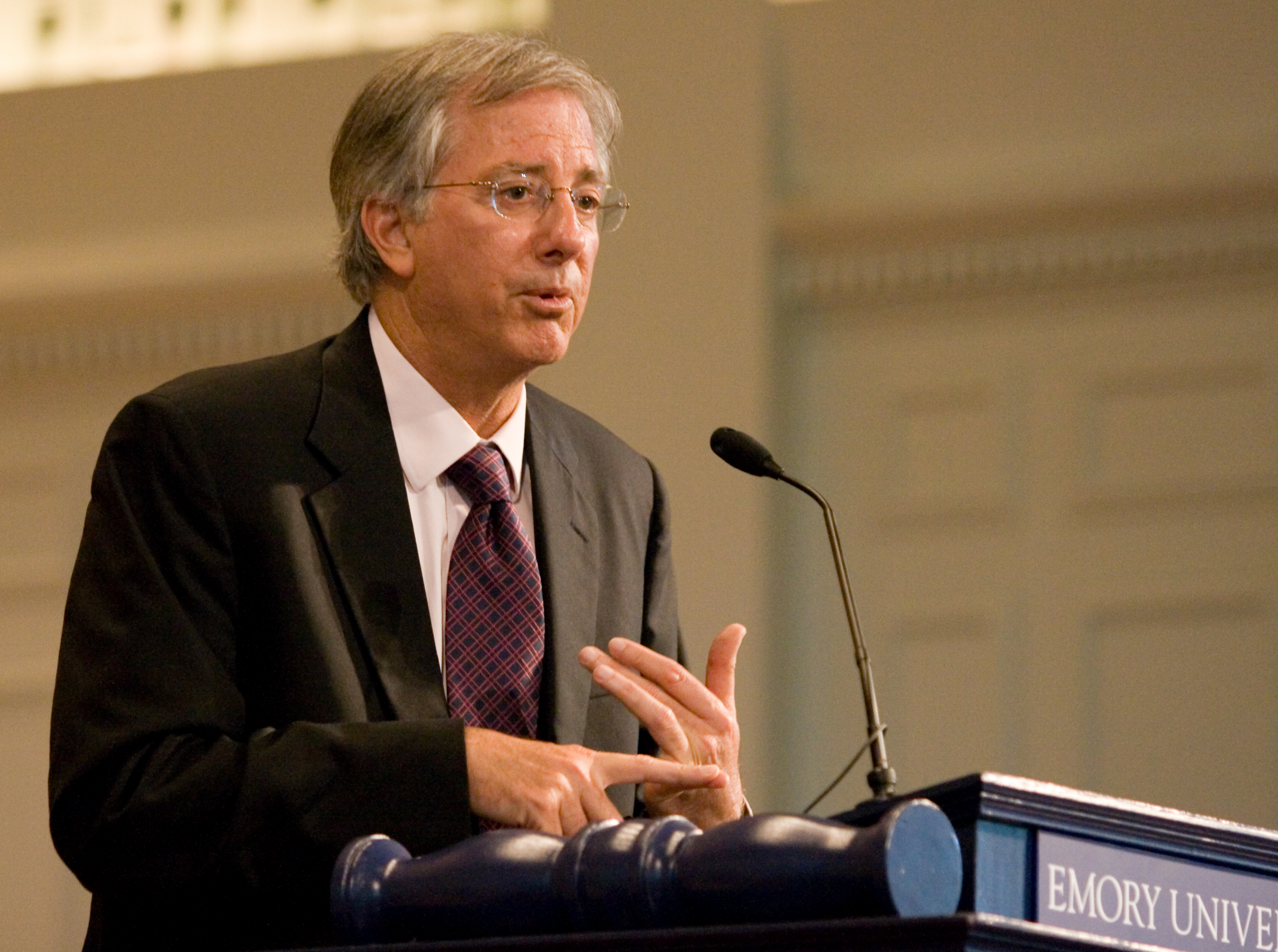

16th Director of Policy Planning
- In office January 21, 1989 – August 23, 1992
- President: George H. W. Bush
- Preceded by: Richard H. Solomon
- Succeeded by: Samuel W. Lewis

Personal details
- Born: November 26, 1948 (age 77) San Francisco, California, U.S.
- Party: Democratic
- Education: University of California, Los Angeles (PhD)

Dennis B. Ross (born November 26, 1948) is an American diplomat and author. He served as the Director of Policy Planning in the State Department under U.S. President George H. W. Bush, the special Middle East coordinator under President Bill Clinton, and was a special adviser for the Persian Gulf and Southwest Asia (including Iran) to former U.S. Secretary of State Hillary Clinton. Ross is currently a fellow at The Washington Institute for Near East Policy, a pro-Israel think tank, and co-chairs the Jewish People Policy Institute think tank's board of directors.

== Early life and education ==
Ross was born in San Francisco, California, and grew up in Belvedere, California. His mother is Jewish and his stepfather is Catholic.

Ross graduated from the University of California, Los Angeles in 1970 and did graduate work there, writing a doctoral dissertation on decision-making in the Soviet Union. He became religiously Jewish after the Six-Day War. In 2002, he co-founded the Kol Shalom synagogue in Rockville, Maryland.

== Career ==
=== 1970s–1993 ===
During U.S. President Jimmy Carter's administration, Ross worked under Deputy Assistant Secretary of Defense Paul Wolfowitz in the Pentagon. There he co-authored a study recommending greater U.S. intervention in the Persian Gulf region "because of our need for Persian Gulf oil and because events in the Persian Gulf affect the Arab–Israeli conflict." During the Reagan administration, Ross served as director of Near East and South Asian affairs in the U.S. National Security Council and Deputy Director of the Pentagon's Office of Net Assessment (1982–84).

Ross returned briefly to academia in the 1980s, serving as executive director of the University of California at Berkeley-Stanford University program on Soviet international behavior from 1984 to 1986.

In the administration of President George H. W. Bush, Ross was director of the United States State Department's Policy Planning Staff, working on U.S. policy toward the former Soviet Union, the reunification of Germany and its integration into NATO, arms control, and the 1991 Gulf War. He also worked with U.S. Secretary of State James Baker on convincing Arab and Israeli leaders to attend the 1991 Middle East peace conference in Madrid, Spain.

=== Middle East envoy ===
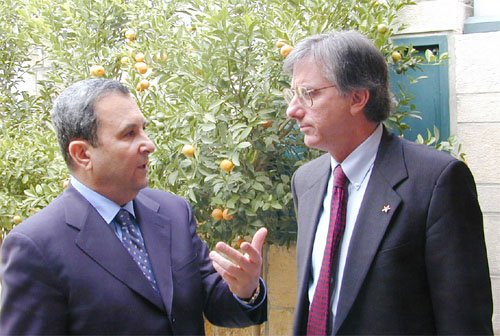
Ross (right) with Ehud Barak in 1999.

Although Ross had worked for outgoing Republican President Bush (even assisting in his re-election effort), incoming Democratic Secretary of State Warren Christopher asked Ross to stay on for a short time to help with early Middle Eastern policy in the new administration. In the summer of 1993 U.S. President Bill Clinton named Ross Middle East envoy. He helped the Israelis and Palestinians reach the 1995 Interim Agreement on the West Bank and the Gaza Strip and brokered the Protocol Concerning the Redeployment in Hebron in 1997. He facilitated the Israel–Jordan peace treaty, and also worked on talks between Israel and Syria.

Ross headed a team of several people in the Office of the Special Middle East Coordinator, including his deputy Aaron David Miller, Robert Malley, Jon Schwarz, Gamal Helal, and Daniel Kurtzer (until 1994). Ross, consulting his team, drew up the Clinton Parameters as a bridging solution to save the Israeli–Palestinian negotiations in December 2000.

Ross was criticized by people on both sides of the conflict. Former Palestinian Foreign Minister Nabil Shaath described him as being more "pro-Israeli than the Israelis." Occasional references to his Jewish ancestry were brought up within the Arab world (although Ross maintains this was not a problem with other heads of state during negotiations), while some conservative Israelis branded him "self-hating"—each questioning his ability to be unbiased, though Palestinians involved in the negotiation process would insist that his perceived lack of objectivity had little to do with his religion. Describing Ross, Roger Cohen wrote that "Balance is something this meticulous diplomat [Ross] prizes.” But a recurrent issue with Ross, who embraced the Jewish faith after being raised in a non-religious home by a Jewish mother and Catholic stepfather, has been asked whether he is too close to the American Jewish community and Israel to be an honest broker with Iran or Arabs. Aaron David Miller, after years of working with Ross, concluded in a book that he 'had an inherent tendency to see the world of Arab–Israeli politics first from Israel's vantage point rather than that of the Palestinians.' Another former senior State Department official, who requested anonymity ... told me, "Ross's bad habit is pre-consultation with the Israelis."

=== Post-Clinton-era activities ===
After leaving his position as envoy, Ross returned to The Washington Institute for Near East Policy think tank as counselor and Ziegler Distinguished Fellow. He became chair of the Jerusalem-based think tank, the Jewish People Policy Planning Institute, funded and founded in 2002 by the Jewish Agency for Israel, the operative branch of the World Zionist Organization (WZO).

During these years he taught classes at Marquette University, Brandeis University, Harvard University's Kennedy School, and Georgetown University's Walsh School of Foreign Service, where he served as a Distinguished Professor in the Practice of Diplomacy. He also wrote frequently for publications such as The Washington Post, The New York Times, The Jerusalem Post, The New Republic, USA Today, and The Wall Street Journal and worked as a foreign affairs analyst for the Fox News channel.

Ross was a noted supporter of the 2003 Iraq war, and signed two Project for a New American Century (PNAC) letters in support of the war in March 2003. However, he opposed some of the Bush administration's policies for post-war reconstruction. He also opposed Bush's policy of avoiding direct talks with Iran.

=== Obama Administration positions ===
According to The Wall Street Journal, Ross, along with James Steinberg and Daniel Kurtzer, was among the principal authors of then-presidential candidate Barack Obama's address on the Middle East to AIPAC in June 2008. It was viewed as the Democratic nominee's most expansive on international affairs.

Ross was appointed Special Advisor for the Persian Gulf and Southwest Asia to U.S. Secretary of State Hillary Clinton on February 23, 2009. On June 25, 2009 the White House announced that Ross was leaving the State Department to join the National Security Council staff as a Special Assistant to the President and Senior Director for the Central Region, with overall responsibility for the region. The Central Region includes the Middle East, the Persian Gulf, Afghanistan, Pakistan, and South Asia.

Haaretz reported that Ross's work as a Middle East aide in the Obama administration was burdened by tension with special envoy George Mitchell, to the point that Ross and Mitchell sometimes refused to speak to each other. This report indicated that the tension was caused, at least in part, by Ross's occasional efforts to conduct negotiations with Israeli government officials without notifying Mitchell. For example, in both September and November 2010, Ross was said to have tried to persuade Prime Minister Benjamin Netanyahu to freeze settlement construction during negotiations with the Palestinian National Authority, in exchange for unspecified private assurances and a major military arms transfer from the United States.

Palestinian officials reportedly viewed Ross as beholden to the Israeli government, and not as an even-handed facilitator of negotiations. For a period, Ross refrained from meeting Palestinian Authority officials, while continuing to hold talks with Israeli officials during his visits to the region.

On November 10, 2011, Ross stepped down from his post in the Obama administration. He rejoined The Washington Institute as William Davidson Distinguished Fellow, Counselor, Irwin Levy Family Program on the U.S.-Israel Strategic Relationship. He currently serves on the advisory board for the non-profit America Abroad Media.

== Controversies ==
In their 2006 paper The Israel Lobby and U.S. Foreign Policy, John Mearsheimer, political science professor at the University of Chicago, and Stephen Walt, academic dean of the Harvard Kennedy School at Harvard University, named Ross as a member of the "Israeli lobby" in the United States. Ross in turn criticized the academics behind the paper. In 2008, Time reported that a former colleague of Ross, former ambassador Daniel Kurtzer, published a think-tank monograph containing anonymous complaints from Arab and American negotiators saying Ross was seen as biased towards Israel and not "an honest broker".

Ross's memoir of his experiences, The Missing Peace: The Inside Story of the Fight for Middle East Peace, tells his side of the story and outlines key lessons to be drawn. His 2007 book, Statecraft: And How to Restore America's Standing in the World, criticizes the administration of U.S. President George W. Bush for its failure to use the tools of statecraft to advance U.S. national interests. He advocates instead for a neoliberal foreign policy which relies on a much broader and more effective use of statecraft. While he has worked under both Republican and Democratic administrations, Ross himself is a Democrat.

Ross states in The Missing Peace that he and other American negotiators pushed Israeli Prime Minister Ehud Barak to accept Palestinian sovereignty over Arab neighborhoods of East Jerusalem during the Middle East Peace Summit at Camp David. Ross wrote part of Barack Obama's speech to the American Israel Public Affairs Committee during the 2008 Presidential campaign, and the speech stated that "Jerusalem is Israel's capital" and that it should not be divided again. The Jerusalem Post reported in November 2008 that, according to Ross, these were "facts." However, Ross stated that the "third point," which is the position of the United States since the Camp David Accords, is that the final status of the city will be resolved by negotiations.

In February 2018, he penned an opinion piece in The Washington Post strongly supportive of the Saudi crown prince Muhammad bin Salman, calling him "a Saudi revolutionary" and opining that he saw "him as more like Mustafa Kemal Atatürk—a leader who revolutionized Turkey by taking away the power of the religious base and secularizing the country."

Aaron David Miller and Ambassador Daniel Kurtzer, two of the most senior officials (and Ross' long time collaborators during the peace process) would later attribute the failures of the peace process to Ross.

== Affiliations ==
Ross co-founded the advocacy group United Against Nuclear Iran (UANI) with Ambassador Richard Holbrooke, former CIA director R. James Woolsey Jr., and former U.S. ambassador to the United Nations for Management and Reform Mark Wallace. He is currently on the advisory board of UANI as well as on the Counter Extremism Project, a non-profit non-governmental organization that combats extremist groups. Ross is currently a fellow at The Washington Institute for Near East Policy, a pro-Israel think tank, and co-chairs the Jewish People Policy Institute think tank's board of directors.

== Works ==
- Acting with Caution: Middle East Policy Planning for the Second Reagan Administration. Policy Papers #1. Washington Institute for Near East Policy. 1985. Archived from the original on March 5, 2009. – the Washington Institute's first policy paper
- Reforming the Palestinian Authority: Requirements for Change. Policy Focus #43. Washington Institute for Near East Policy. August 2002. Archived from the original on March 5, 2009.
- The Missing Peace: The Inside Story of the Fight for Middle East Peace. Farrar, Straus, and Giroux. August 2004. ISBN 0-374-19973-6.
- Foreword for: Levitt, Matthew (May 1, 2006). Hamas: Politics, Charity, and Terrorism in the Service of Jihad. Yale University Press. ISBN 0-300-11053-7.
- Statecraft: And How to Restore America's Standing in the World. Farrar, Straus, and Giroux. June 2007. ISBN 978-0-374-29928-6.
- Myths, Illusions, and Peace: Finding a New Direction for America in the Middle East, with David Makovsky, Viking, 2009, ISBN 0-670-02089-3 ISBN 978-0670020898.
- Doomed to Succeed: The U.S.-Israel Relationship from Truman to Obama Farrar, Straus, and Giroux. October 2015 ISBN 978-0-37414-146-2
- Trump and the Middle East: Prospects and Tasks, Fathom, Winter 2016
- Critical Reflections on the Trump Peace Plan, Fathom, April 2019
- Statecraft 2.0: What America Needs to Lead in a Multipolar World, Oxford University Press, May 2025, ISBN 978-0-19769-895-2 ISBN 978-0-19769-891-4

=== Awards ===
- 2015: National Jewish Book Award in the History category for Doomed to Succeed: The U.S.-Israel Relationship from Truman to Obama

== See also ==
- Israel–United States relations
- Nuclear program of Iran
