= Baruch Mizrachi family =

Old Jewish family in Jerusalem

Baruch Mizrachi בית ברוך מזרחי
- Current region: Jerusalem, Israel
- Origin: Jerusalem, Ottoman Palestine
- Founded: 1621
- Founder: Baruch Mizrachi
- Members: Yitzhak Navon; Gilead Sher
- Traditions: The family retained ownership of ancestral houses in the Old City, with a will preventing the sale of these houses.
- Estate: Houses in the Old City of Jerusalem (until 1967)

Baruch Mizrachi (Hebrew: בית ברוך מזרחי, Beit Baruch Mizrachi, "House of Baruch Mizrachi") is an old Jewish family in Jerusalem, whose ancestor came to Jerusalem in 1621 and bought five houses in what is now called the Old City.

In 1643, Mizrachi wrote a will bequeathing the houses to his sons, yet preventing them from selling the houses, and obliging them to bequeath the houses to their sons, so that when the Messiah comes, Mizrahi will be able to return and live in his houses. The houses passed from generation to generation, and were the main reason that the family didn't leave Jerusalem (many other Jewish families left the city because of the economic conditions at the time). The houses were leased by the family members since the turn of the 20th century to an Arab family, while the family members built their houses outside the walls surrounding the Old City.

== Post-independence ==
In 1948, the Old City was conquered by the Jordanian army, and the same Arab family continued living in the houses. When Israel conquered East Jerusalem after the Six-Day War in 1967, the family members returned to the houses and claimed ownership to the property. At the time, the Israeli authorities expropriated and demolished all the houses in the Jewish Quarter of the Old City of Jerusalem in order to build a new neighborhood, and hence the family members were able to collect only compensation, which they felt they were not allowed to collect because of Baruch Mizrachi's will. Instead it was agreed that on the new building, a plaque would be mounted with the family's story.

Jerusalem mayors Teddy Kollek, Uri Lupolianski and Nir Barkat promised that upon the arrival of the Messiah, Baruch Mizrachi will be able to receive from the municipality five new houses in Jerusalem.

== Descendants ==
Several descendants of the family are known today, including former Israeli president Yitzhak Navon and Gilead Sher, an Israeli peace negotiator.
