= The Clinton Parameters =

Guidelines for a two-state solution

The Clinton Parameters (Hebrew: מתווה קלינטון, Mitveh Clinton, Arabic: معايير كلينتون Ma'ayir Clinton) were guidelines for a permanent status agreement to resolve the Israeli–Palestinian conflict, proposed during the final weeks of the Presidential transition from Bill Clinton to George W. Bush.

Following the suspension of the 2000 Camp David Summit in July, negotiations between Israelis and Palestinians took place from 19 to 23 December 2000. The Parameters were the compromises that Clinton believed to be the best possible within the margins of the positions of the two parties. The Clinton Parameters were meant to be the basis for further negotiations.

The proposal was presented on 23 December. On 28 December, the Israeli Government formally accepted the plan with reservations. In a meeting in the White House, on 2 January 2001, Yasser Arafat also officially accepted the parameters with reservations. The White House confirmed this the following day in a statement which said that "both sides have now accepted the president's ideas with some reservations." In 2005, Clinton wrote that he considered the Israeli reservations within the Parameters and the Palestinians' outside them.

The inconclusive Taba Summit took place three weeks after the Palestinian response, but ran out of time ahead of the 2001 Israeli prime ministerial election.

== Background ==
The background for the Clinton's Parameters was the failure of the 2000 Camp David Summit, the following outbreak of the Second Intifada (al-Aqsa Intifada), the upcoming Israeli elections, which polls indicated a possible defeat for then Prime Minister Ehud Barak, and the end of the Clinton presidency, in which Bill Clinton desired to end the eight years of peace efforts and Middle East arena in a successful note.

The negotiations, which were suspended on 25 July 2000, were resumed on 19 December at Bolling Air Force Base in Washington. On 21 December, President Clinton presented a plan for a final-status agreement on the basis of former talks. As the parties failed to reach an agreement, Clinton offered bridging proposals, later dubbed "the Clinton Parameters".

In November 2000, Barak offered to create a Palestinian state on 75% of Gaza Strip and 33% of the West Bank; the Palestinians rejected this offer.

The proposal was drawn up by Israeli–Palestinian envoy Dennis Ross, but represented discussions in September between Ross and the other members of his team—Aaron David Miller, Gamal Helal, Jon Schwartz, and Robert Malley. President Clinton was not consulted in creating the proposal.

== The Parameters ==
The (non-negotiable) Clinton Parameters, to accept within four days as a condition for Clinton's proceeded support, were orally presented on 23 December 2000.

Clinton proposed: A Palestinian state, including 94–96% of the West Bank; Israeli annexation of settlements in blocks, with 80% of the current settler population; in East Jerusalem, Arab areas for the Palestinians and Jewish ones for the Israeli; temporary international and Israeli presence in the Jordan Valley and the long-term presence of 3 Israeli-controlled "early warning stations"; Palestinian sovereignty over its own airspace; return of refugees only to the Palestinian state, in principle. The Parameters did not mention Gaza at all, but Clinton declared on 7 January 2001, that the Palestinian state would include the Gaza Strip. The proposed percentage of the West Bank the Palestinians would get, however, was ambiguous, as the Israelis did not include the annexed areas in East Jerusalem, the no-man's land and the Palestinian part of the Dead Sea. This would decrease the Israeli offer some 5%.

=== Details ===
==== Territory ====
The Clinton Parameters proposed a Palestinian state comprising between 94–96% of the West Bank and the entire Gaza Strip. Israel would annex the remaining land, which would include Israeli settlements, containing 80% of the settler population, mainly in major settlement blocs. Israel would cede 1–3% of land to the Palestinians in land swaps to partially compensate for the annexations. The Palestinian state would have to be contiguous, and annexed areas along with the number of Palestinians affected would be as minimized as possible.

The Clinton proposal didn't specify a map, but left it up to the Israelis and Palestinians to develop a map according to the above criteria.

==== Jerusalem ====
According to the Parameters, Israel would gain sovereignty over the Western Wall. The Palestinians would gain sovereignty and Israel would gain "symbolic ownership" over the rest of the Temple Mount, with both parties sharing sovereignty over the issue of excavations under the Temple Mount. East Jerusalem and its Old City would be divided according to ethnic lines, with Israel gaining sovereignty over Jewish settlements, and the Palestinians gaining sovereignty over Arab neighborhoods.

==== Refugees ====
The Parameters required the Palestinians to waive their claim to an unlimited "right of return" to Israel proper, and Israel to acknowledge the "moral and material suffering caused to the Palestinian people by the 1948 war, and the need to assist the international community in addressing the problem". Under the Parameters, an international commission would be established to implement all aspects dealing with refugees as part of a permanent peace agreement. The Palestinian state would accept all refugees wishing to settle in its territory. The remaining refugees would be rehabilitated in their host countries, immigrate to third-party countries, and a limited number could settle in Israel if it agreed to accept them. Both sides would agree that United Nations General Assembly Resolution 194 has been implemented.

==== Security ====
The Israel Defense Forces would withdraw within 36 months and gradually be replaced by an international force. Israel would retain a small military presence in fixed locations in the Jordan Valley under the authority of the international force for another 36 months. This period could be reduced in the event of the diminishing of regional threats to Israel. Israel would also maintain three radar facilities in the West Bank (Early Warning Stations, EWS). These facilities would have a Palestinian liaison and would be subject to review after every ten years, with any changes in their status to be mutually agreed by both parties.

The Palestinian state would gain sovereignty over its own airspace, with special reservations for Israeli training and operational needs. The Palestinian state would also be defined as a "non-militarized state", and would not possess conventional military forces, but would be allowed to have a "strong security force". The Palestinian state would also have an international force for border security and deterrence.

In the event of a military threat to Israel's national security requiring a state of emergency, Israel would be allowed to deploy military forces to certain areas and routes, according to a pre-drawn map. International forces would have to be notified prior to any such deployments.

==== End of the conflict ====
The Parameters required that this agreement put an end to the conflict and any other claims. This could be implemented through a United Nations Security Council Resolution declaring that Resolutions 242 and 338 have been implemented.

== Acceptance and reservations ==
On 3 January 2001, the White House released an official statement which stated that both sides had accepted the President's parameters with reservations. According to Bill Clinton and Dennis Ross, Barak's reservations were "within" the Parameters, while Arafat's reservations were "outside" them. According to Jeremy Pressman, however, the Israeli reservations were in contradiction with the Parameters, notably Barak's rejection of Palestinian sovereignty over the Temple Mount. Moreover, the Israelis demanded a route between East Jerusalem and the Jordan River (to pass by a tunnel or bridge, providing "contiguous" territory) and probably an additional one from Ariel, which would cut the West Bank into pieces. On the other hand, from the Palestinian reservations, only the refugee point seemed fundamental. Ross quoted Saudi Prince Bandar as saying while negotiations were taking place in December: "If Arafat does not accept what is available now, it won't be a tragedy; it will be a crime."

=== Israel ===
The Parameters received a mix of support and criticism within Israel, with some in the Israeli government, as well as the Mayor of Jerusalem opposing them. There were also fears that the Parameters would not be approved in a public referendum, and that the Palestinians might violate their terms of the agreements.

Despite some provisions on Jerusalem being contrary to the election promises of Prime Minister Ehud Barak, the Parameters received wide support in the Israeli cabinet, which voted early on 28 December with 10 votes to 2 to accept them, but with reservations and on condition the Palestinians would accept them as well. Only Cabinet Minister Roni Milo resigned over his objection to the Cabinet's approval of the plan. IDF Chief of Staff Shaul Mofaz strongly opposed the Clinton Parameters, warning that an Israeli withdrawal from the Jordan Valley (even if replaced by an international security force) threatened the security of Israel.

On 31 December, Barak declared that Israel had accepted Clinton's proposals, but will not accept the Palestinian right of return to Israel and sovereignty over the Temple Mount. Although he chose to accept the plan, Barak sent Clinton a 20-page letter of "reservations". The two main points were that he "would not sign any document that transfers sovereignty on the Temple Mount to the Palestinians", and that "no Israeli prime minister will accept even one refugee on the basis of the right of return." Minor reservations were also made with regard to security arrangements, deployment areas, and control over passages. In a phone conversation with Clinton, Prime Minister Barak also demanded that Israel be allowed to retain sovereignty over the "sacred basin"—the whole area outside the Old City that includes the City of David and the Tombs of the Prophets on the road to the Mount of Olives, which was not mentioned in the Parameters.

According to Ahron Bregman, three days after accepting the Clinton Parameters, Barak telephoned President Clinton and told him "I do not intend to sign any agreement before the elections."

=== Palestinians ===
In a letter of 27 December 2000, Arafat asked for some clarification of the proposals:

Mr. President, please allow me address you with all the sincerity emanating from the close friendship that ties us, and the historical importance of what you are trying to do. I want to assure you of my will to continue to work with you to reach a peace agreement. I need your help in clarifying and explaining the basis of your initiative.

I need clear answers to many questions relating to calculation of land ratios that will be annexed and swapped, and the actual location of these territories, as well as the basis for defining the Wailing Wall, its borders and extensions, and the effect of that on the concept of full Palestinian sovereignty over al-Haram al-Sharif.

We understand that the idea of leasing additional territory is an option we have the right to reject, and is not a parameter of your bridging proposals. We also presume that the emergency Israeli locations are also subject to negotiations and to our approval. I hope that you have the same understanding.

I have many questions relating to the return of refugees to their homes and villages. I have a negative experience with the return of displaced Palestinians to the West Bank and Gaza during the Interim Period. Because the modalities remained tied to an Israeli veto, not one refugee was allowed to return through the mechanism of the interim agreement, which required a quadripartite committee of Egypt, Jordan, Israel and Palestine to decide on their return. Equally, I don't see a clear approach dealing with compensation of the refugees for their land, property and funds taken by Israel under the aegis of the Israeli custodian of absentee property.

I feel, Mr. President, that the period for Israeli withdrawal specified in your initiative is too long. It will allow the enemies of peace to exploit the time to undo the agreement. I wonder if the "Period" is one of the fixed parameters of your proposal; a "basis" that cannot be changed.

Mr. President, I have many questions. I need maps, details, and clarifications that can help me take the necessary decisions with my leadership and people.

I would like you to appreciate that I do not want to procrastinate or waste time.

We need a real opportunity to invest once more your determination and creativity to reach a fair and lasting peace with you efforts and during your presidency.

I remain, Mr. President, ready to pay you a visit at the White House, in the shortest possible time if you find this visit appropriate, to discuss with you the bridging proposals and to exchange views on ways to develop them further.

Please accept my highest regards and best wishes,

Yasser Arafat

According to Clayton Swisher, Arafat's letter "puncture[s] yet another myth of Palestinian rejectionism ... that Israel accepted [the parameters] while the Palestinians rejected them... Ross diligently spread this fairy tale, as did the president himself."

A summit with Arafat and Barak the next day in Egypt was cancelled. On 1 January, the Palestinian Negotiating Team (NAD) published an open letter, explaining why the proposals would "fail to satisfy the conditions required for a permanent peace". They claimed that the parameters divided the Palestinian state, including East Jerusalem, into separate cantons and unconnected islands, and protested the surrender the right of return of Palestinian refugees and lack of clarity and details. Clinton's proposal was not accompanied by a map; only the Israelis presented a map, which would allegedly render the Palestinian state unviable and lacking direct access to international borders. The Palestinians opposed the Israeli annexation of settlement blocs in the West Bank, including East Jerusalem, which they claimed subordinated the contiguity of the Palestinian state. They also protested that Israel would gain control over their natural resources, and was planning on ceding them less valuable land on the outskirts of West Bank and Gaza in exchange. While Arafat flew to Washington to meet with President Clinton, the newspaper Al-Ayyam published in Arabic a letter to Clinton with the Palestinian reservations.

On 2 January 2001, at a meeting in the White House, Arafat gave his qualified agreement to the Parameters with reservations. In a memorandum, his Negotiations Support Unit (NSU) had warned him "that the proposals in general are too vague and unclear to form an acceptable framework for an agreement". The negotiation team opposed the use of percentages. First, the Israelis were to make clear which reasonable needs they had in specific areas; without a map, the percentages given were also ambiguous, as the Israelis did not include all disputed land or part of the Dead Sea, and it was unclear where the 80% proportion of settlers would remain. All Israeli settlers taken together occupied around 1.8% of the West Bank. The Palestinian concerns about lack of contiguity were largely related to Israeli control over large swaths of land in key development areas such as Jerusalem and Bethlehem, due to the large settlement blocs. Palestinians would be unable to move without restriction within their own state.

A PLO website gives further comments on the Parameters. The Palestinian position about the right of return was, as it has always been, that it is an individual universal right which can never be set aside. This right they see acknowledged in UN resolution 194.

== Public opinion ==
A 25 December published poll found that 48% of the 501 Israelis questioned were opposed to the proposals; 57% would object to Palestinian control of the Al-Aqsa Mosque compound; 72% were against even a limited return of Palestinian refugees to Israel. A 29 December published poll found that 56% of the Israelis would oppose a peace agreement reached on the basis of the Parameters.

A poll carried out in 2011 by the Hebrew University indicated that a growing number of Palestinians and Israelis supported a settlement to the conflict based on the Parameters. The poll found that 58% of Israelis and 50% of Palestinians supported a two-state solution based on the Clinton Parameters, compared with 47% of Israelis and 39% of Palestinians in 2003, the first year the poll was carried out.

== Aftermath ==
Additional attempts to reach a compromise at the Taba Summit were unsuccessful, although some progress was made. In Israel, the Prime Minister's opponents claimed that his government lacked the support of the Israeli public, the Knesset (Israeli parliament) and the polls, and that he was submitting Israel to a "liquidation sale".

Even before the Clinton Parameters were presented, George W. Bush had won the 2000 election, defeating Bill Clinton's Vice President Al Gore. About a month after the Clinton Parameters, Ariel Sharon won the 2001 Israeli prime ministerial election. Both George Bush and Ariel Sharon opposed the Clinton Parameters. Bush had criticized Clinton's efforts both on the campaign trail, and during his meeting with Ariel Sharon in March 2001. According to Bush, Clinton had tried to rush the Israelis and Palestinians into making peace in light of the limited time he had as president.

President Bush informed the newly elected PM Sharon that his administration did not consider the Clinton Parameters valid, likewise Sharon did not feel bound by Barak's proposals. The US State Department under the Bush administration formally repudiated the Clinton Parameters.
