= Ron Hassner =

American political scientist (born 1971)

- Born: Ron E. Hassner; 1971 (age 54–55)

Education
- Education: Stanford University (Ph.D.); Columbia University (M.A.); London School of Economics and Political Science (B.Sc.)

Philosophical work
- Institutions: University of California, Berkeley
- Main interests: Religious violence

Ron Hassner is an American political scientist and international relations scholar. He is a professor of political science at University of California, Berkeley. He holds a Chancellor's Chair in political science and is the Helen Diller Family Chair in Israel studies at Berkeley.

Hassner's work focuses on religion and conflict, especially territorial disputes over sacred spaces. His research also encompasses religion in the military and the effectiveness of interrogational torture. He is a faculty director of the Helen Diller Institute for Jewish Law and Israel Studies at U.C. Berkeley. Hassner is a recipient of Berkeley's campus-wide Distinguished Teaching Award.

== Education and career ==
Hassner holds a B.Sc. in international relations from The London School of Economics (1995), a master's in international affairs from the School of International and Public Affairs at Columbia University (1997), a master's in religious studies from Stanford University (2000), and a Ph.D. in political science from Stanford University (2003). He was a postdoctoral scholar at Harvard University's Olin Center.

In 2004, Hassner joined the political science faculty at the University of California, Berkeley. Since then, he was visiting scholar at Stanford University's Center for International Security and Cooperation and at the International Institute for Counter-Terrorism at the Interdisciplinary Center Herzliya. In 2014, he received Berkeley's campus-wide Distinguished Teaching Award.

In 2023, Hassner was recognized with a Distinguished Scholar Award from the "Religion and International Relations" section of the International Studies Association. Later that year, he received the Susanne Hoeber Rudolph Outstanding Scholar in Religion and Politics Award from the American Political Science Association.

== Research ==
Hassner is a scholar of religion and international conflict. He has studied territorial disputes, including disputes over holy places, the role of religion in militaries and on the battlefield, and the history of torture under the Spanish Inquisition.

=== Religion as a Cause of War ===
In War on Sacred Grounds, Hassner argued that conflicts over holy places are difficult to resolve because these sites pose an indivisibility problem: they cannot be shared or divided the way other pieces of land are often shared to resolve conflict. The Temple Mount in Jerusalem and the Great Mosque of Mecca function as key case studies as do contested shrines in India.

In this book and in related articles and book chapters he also explains the many motivations for conflicts at sacred sites, including the use of these structured as insurgent hideouts and as prominent targets in civil wars.

=== Religion in the military ===
His work subsequently shifted to analyzing religion as a factor during war, including such wars in which religion is not a motivator. In Religion in the Military Worldwide, he commissioned essays on the many ways in which religion shapes military service around the world, including countries like Canada, Turkey, Japan, and Iran. In Religion on the Battlefield, Hassner looks at the effects of religion on tactics and strategy. The focus here is on wars in which religion did not necessarily play a motivating role, to show that even in crucial military settings—such as World War I and World War II—religion enabled and constrained military decision making.

These essays explore religious rituals, conflicts over religious freedom in the military, how religion affects promotion or unit formation, and how religion in the military affects religion in society more broadly. He shows how sacred time and space, rituals and authority structures, had an impact on soldiers, commanders, and units. Salient examples include the bombing of Rome in World War II, and the Yom Kippur War. In this book and related publications, Hassner attempts to shift the focus of the study of religion and war away from studying terrorists and insurgents and onto the effects of religion on conventional armies, including Western secular armies.

=== Torture ===
Hassner's most recent scholarship is on torture. He argues that the "myth of the ticking time bomb scenario" as a dangerous yet influential metaphor that bears no relationship to reality. He argues that much of the current debate on torture draws on flimsy and biased sources. Though much current torture criticism relies on the claim that "torture doesn't work", Hassner shows that the evidence to support this claim is weak. Moreover, Americans find the claim to be unpersuasive: they believe that torture is quick and effective. In contrast, Americans find the claim that torture is cruel to be a far more persuasive argument against torture.

In Anatomy of Torture, he analyzes hundreds of trials from the archives of the Spanish Inquisition to uncover the causes, character, and consequences of torture. His book analyzes dozens of cases of torture from Spain and Mexico in the 16th and 17th centuries, relying on archival evidence from Europe and the Americas. These files demonstrate that "torture yielded information that was often reliable: witnesses in the torture chamber and witnesses that were not tortured provided corresponding information about collaborators, locations, events, and practices. Nonetheless, inquisitors treated the results of interrogations in the torture chamber with skepticism." The torture conducted by the Inquisition yielded corroborative evidence that the Inquisition found useful but it did so slowly and at tremendous social, political, and moral cost. Hassner urges caution in applying those findings to current torture debates.

== See also ==
- Religious war
- Sacred space
- Military chaplain
- Interrogational torture
- Ticking time bomb scenario
