= Kenneth Levin =

American historian

Kenneth Levin (born 1944) is a psychiatrist and historian living in Newton, Massachusetts. He is the author of The Oslo Syndrome: Delusions of a People Under Siege.

Levin is a clinical instructor of psychiatry at Harvard Medical School. He holds a B.A. from the University of Pennsylvania, a B.A./M.A. in English language and literature from Oxford University, an M.D. degree from the University of Pennsylvania, and a Ph.D. in history from Princeton University. His thesis was on "Sigmund Freud's Early Studies of the Neuroses, 1886–1905."

In an article entitled, "Transforming the Jewish Psyche," journalist Warren Kozak discussed Levin's analysis of the modern "penchant for self-denigration among Jewish people." Kozak summarized that "Dr. Levin, no sixth grade thinker, tells us that after centuries of hearing grotesque lies about Jewish people, that narrative hasn't just rubbed off on anti-Semites, but on some Jews as well." In an interview with the Jerusalem Post, Manfred Gerstenfeld praised Levin's Oslo Syndrome for bringing to light "this phenomenon of identifying with one's besiegers."

Following the 2005 publication of his book The Oslo Syndrome: Delusions of a People Under Siege, Levin became a frequent commentator on Middle East affairs.

According to Levin, the Oslo syndrome is a corollary of the Stockholm syndrome. Levin's original contribution is that the syndrome can afflict an entire people. The concept has passed into common usage in discussions of the Middle East.

== Books ==
- Freud's Early Psychology of the Neuroses: A Historical Perspective and Unconscious Fantasy in Psychotherapy
- Unconscious Fantasy in Psychotherapy (1993)
- The Oslo Syndrome: Delusions of a People Under Siege (2005)

== See also ==
- Oslo Accords
- Israeli–Palestinian peace process
- Stockholm Syndrome
