= The Oslo Syndrome =

2005 book by Kenneth Levin

The Oslo Syndrome: Delusions of a People Under Siege
- Author: Kenneth Levin
- Publication date: 2005

The Oslo Syndrome: Delusions of a People Under Siege is a 2005 book by Kenneth Levin, a psychiatrist with doctorate in history. The book applies psychiatric insights to the Arab-Israel conflict by arguing that Israel's reaction to perceived Arab hostility is a corollary of the Stockholm syndrome in which hostages come to identify and empathize with their captors.

Originally published in English, the Oslo Syndrome has been translated into Hebrew.

== Synopsis ==
According to Professor Ron Shleifer of Ariel University, Levin, a psychiatrist, compares the acceptance of the Oslo Accords by the Israeli public to Battered child syndrome, in which the victims "blame themselves and are convinced that if they would only behave better, their parents would cease to beat them, without knowing that they will continue to be beaten anyway because it is their parents who have a problem and not they."

Jerold Auerbach, a history professor from Wellesley College, described the book as "comprehensive historical description and compelling psychological interpretation of the “delusions of a people under siege""

Iddo Netanyahu described The Oslo Syndrome "attempts to show how a whole country can suffer from wishful thinking. A great majority [of Israelis] thought the accords we signed with [Palestine Liberation Organization leader Yasser] Arafat and his people would bring peace. All it brought was more bloodshed."

Excerpt from the book:

"This phenomenon reveals great similarity, at the level of human psychology, to the response of children subjected to chronic abuse. Such children tend to blame themselves for their suffering."

Thus, he continues, "those segments of the Jewish community who live and work in environments hostile to Israel, commonly embrace the anti-Israel bias around them. And they often insist they are being virtuous by doing so." This pathology is "no less delusional than that of abused children who blame themselves for the abuse they experience." But, he concludes, the result is awful:

"All too often such children doom themselves psychologically to lives of self-abnegation and misery. In the case of Jews indicting Israel for the hatred directed against it, the misery they cultivate goes far beyond themselves, and ultimately undermines Israel's very survival."
