= Robert Malley =

American diplomat (born 1963)

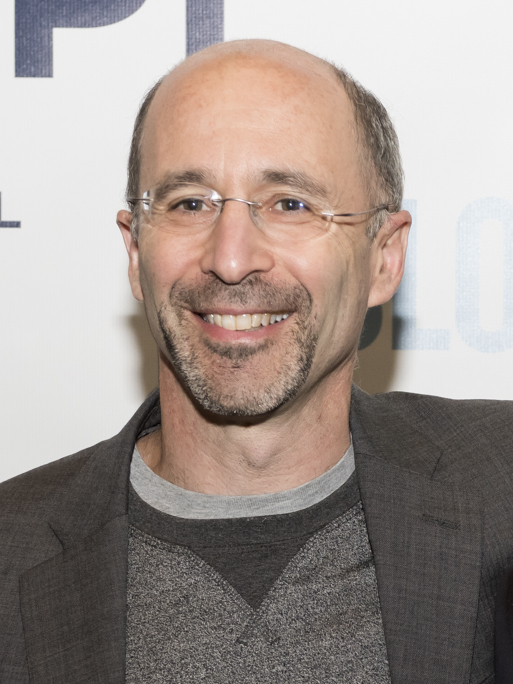

United States Special Envoy for Iran
- In office January 28, 2021 – June 29, 2023; On leave
- President: Joe Biden
- Preceded by: Elliott Abrams
- Succeeded by: Abram Paley (acting)

Personal details
- Born: 1963 (age 62–63)
- Party: Democratic
- Spouse: Caroline Brown
- Children: 3
- Education: Yale University (BA, MA); Magdalen College, Oxford (DPhil); Harvard University (JD)

Robert Malley (born 1963) is an American lawyer, political scientist and specialist in conflict resolution, who was the lead negotiator on the 2015 Iran nuclear deal known as the Joint Comprehensive Plan of Action (JCPOA).

Malley was Director for Democracy, Human Rights and Humanitarian Affairs at the National Security Council from 1994 to 1996 and Program Director for Middle East and North Africa at the International Crisis Group and Assistant to National Security Advisor Sandy Berger from 1996 to 1998. As Special Assistant to President Clinton from 1998 to 2001, he was a member of the U.S. peace team and helped organize the 2000 Camp David Summit. He served in the National Security Council under President Barack Obama from 2014 to 2017. In 2015, the Obama administration appointed Malley as its "point man" on the Middle East, leading the Middle East desk of the National Security Council. In November 2015, Malley was named as President Obama's new special ISIS advisor. After leaving the Obama administration, Malley was President and CEO of the International Crisis Group, a Brussels non-profit committed to preventing wars.

In January 2021, President Joe Biden named Malley as special U.S. envoy for Iran. He was tasked with bringing the United States and Iran into compliance with the JCPOA after it had been abandoned by former president Donald Trump.

In 2023, Malley's security clearance was revoked and he was placed on a leave of absence pending an investigation into his handling of classified information. The investigation was later referred to the Federal Bureau of Investigation (FBI).

== Early life ==
Malley was born in 1963 to Barbara (née Silverstein) Malley, a New Yorker who worked for the United Nations delegation of the Algerian National Liberation Front (FLN), and her husband, Simon Malley (1923–2006), an Egyptian Jewish journalist who worked as a foreign correspondent for the Egyptian newspaper Al Gomhuria. He reported on international affairs, particularly nationalist, anti-imperial movements in Africa, putting the FLN on the world map.

In 1969, the Malley family moved to France, where Simon Malley founded the magazine Africasia (later known as Afrique Asia). Robert attended École Jeannine Manuel, a bilingual school in Paris, and graduated in 1980 in the same class as future U.S. Secretary of State Antony Blinken. The Malleys remained in France until 1980, when then French president Valéry Giscard d'Estaing had Simon Malley expelled due to his hostility towards French policies in Africa.

Robert Malley attended Yale University, and was a 1984 Rhodes Scholar at Magdalen College, Oxford, where he earned a D.Phil. in political philosophy. There he wrote his doctoral thesis about Third-worldism and its decline. He earned a J.D. at Harvard Law School, where he met his future wife, Caroline Brown. Another fellow law school student was Barack Obama. In 1991–1992, Malley clerked for Supreme Court Justice Byron White, while Brown clerked for Supreme Court Justice Sandra Day O'Connor. As of 2010, the couple has two sons, Miles and Blaise, and one daughter, Frances.

== Career ==
After his Supreme Court clerkship, Malley became a Fellow at the Council on Foreign Relations where he published The Call From Algeria: Third Worldism, Revolution, and the Turn to Islam—a book that charts Algeria's political evolution from the turn of the 20th century to the present, exploring the historical and intellectual underpinnings of the crisis in Algeria.

=== Clinton administration ===
Malley served in the Clinton administration as Director for Democracy, Human Rights and Humanitarian Affairs at the National Security Council from 1994 to 1996. In that post he helped coordinate refugee policy, efforts to promote democracy and human rights abroad and U.S. policy toward Cuba. From 1996–1998 he was Executive Assistant to National Security Advisor Sandy Berger. In October 1998, Malley was appointed Special Assistant to President Clinton for Arab-Israeli Affairs, a post he held until the end of the administration in 2001.

=== International Crisis Group ===
After the Clinton Administration, Malley became Senior Policy Advisor for the Center for Middle East Peace and Economic Development in Washington, D.C. He later became Program Director for Middle East and North Africa at the International Crisis Group in Washington, D.C., directing analysts based in Amman, Cairo, Beirut, Tel Aviv and Baghdad. Malley's team covered events from Iran to Morocco, with a heavy focus on the Arab–Israeli conflict, the situation in Iraq, and Islamist movements throughout the region. Malley also covered developments in the United States that affect policy toward the Middle East.

=== Obama campaign and administration ===
According to Barack Obama's 2008 presidential campaign, Malley provided informal advice to the campaign in the past without having any formal role in the campaign. On May 9, 2008, the campaign severed ties with Malley when the British Times reported that Malley had been in discussions with the militant Palestinian group Hamas, listed by the U.S. State Department as a terrorist organization. In response, Malley told The Times he had been in regular contact with Hamas officials as part of his work with the International Crisis Group. "My job with the International Crisis Group is to meet with all sorts of savory and unsavory people and report on what they say. I've never denied whom I meet with; that's what I do", Malley told NBC News, adding that he informs the State Department about his meetings beforehand and briefs them afterward.

In February 2014, it was announced that Malley was joining the Obama administration to consult on Persian Gulf policy as senior director of the National Security Council. On April 6, 2015, Malley replaced Philip H. Gordon as Special Assistant to the President and White House Coordinator for the Middle East, North Africa and the Gulf Region.

==== Lead Iran deal negotiator ====
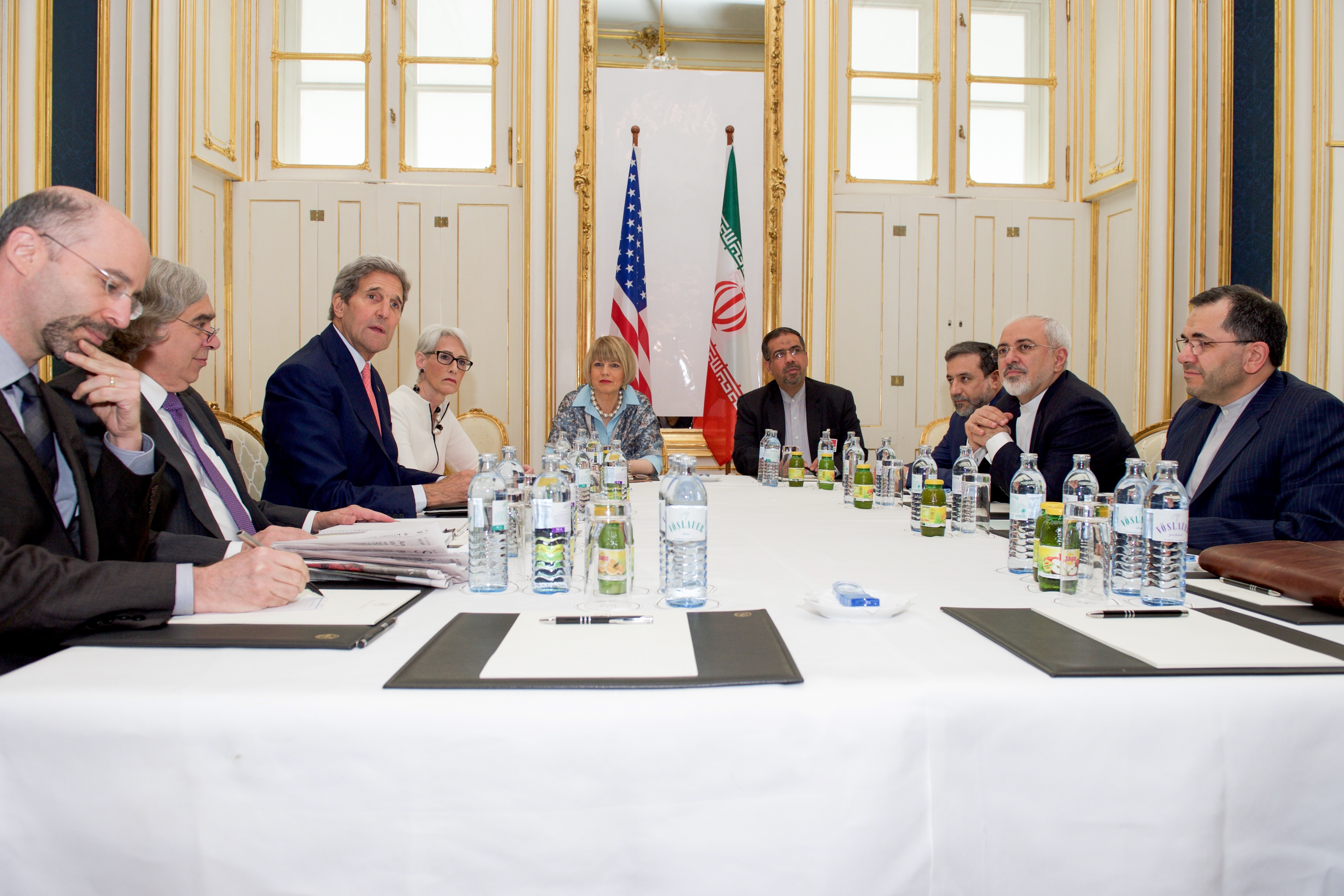
Malley and U.S. Secretary of State John Kerry with Iranian Foreign Minister Javad Zarif in June 2015

Malley was the lead U.S. negotiator on the Joint Comprehensive Plan of Action, signed on July 14, 2015, which aimed to limit Iran's nuclear activities and ensure international inspections of its nuclear facilities in exchange for lifting economic sanctions. In describing the negotiating challenges, Malley later wrote in The Atlantic, "The real choice in 2015 was between achieving a deal that constrained the size of Iran's nuclear program for many years and ensured intrusive inspections forever, or not getting one, meaning no restrictions at all coupled with much less verification.

=== Return to International Crisis Group ===
After Obama left office, Malley returned to the International Crisis Group, serving as the new President and CEO. He served till 2021 and was succeeded by Comfort Ero

=== Service and suspension as Special Envoy to Iran ===
On January 28, 2021, President Biden named Malley U.S. special envoy to Iran, where he was tasked with trying to ease diplomatic tensions with Iran and rein in its nuclear program by compliance to the original pact.

In late April or early May 2023, Malley's security clearance was suspended. An investigation was launched into his possible mishandling of classified material. At the time, the State Department made misleading statements that Malley was only stepping back from some of his duties for personal reasons. The investigation was later referred to the FBI. Malley said that he did not know why his clearance was suspended and hoped it will be reinstated soon. Former US officials have stated that it is rare for a diplomat to have security clearances suspended over single or minor mistakes relating to classified material, indicating that a major incident may have led to the clearance suspension and FBI investigation.

Despite the suspension of his security clearance, Malley continued doing State Department work, including providing media interviews. On June 29, 2023, Malley was placed on unpaid leave as special envoy to Iran after CNN reported on his security clearance suspension. In March 2023, Malley was replaced in his role by Abram Paley as acting Special Envoy for Iran.

In August 2023, an Iranian state-run media outlet published a purported State Department memo from April 21, 2023, which stated that Malley's security clearance was suspended over "serious security concerns" related to his "personal conduct", "handling of protected information" and "use of information technology". The memo's veracity was backed by a person familiar with the Malley investigation, according to Politico. Former State Department officials have also confirmed that the memo matches standard State Department style.

The State Department did not immediately notify members of Congress of Malley's suspension, and also failed in its obligation under Department of State Authorities Act to notify the Office of the Inspector General. When Malley failed to appear for a Senate briefing, the State Department claimed to Congress that he was on "extended personal leave". In response to the failure of the State Department to inform lawmakers of Malley's security clearance revocation, House Republicans introduced a bill to require Congressional notification in the event that top diplomats, such as special envoys, have their security clearances revoked.

== Views ==
Malley has published several articles on the 2000 Camp David Summit in which he participated as a member of the U.S. negotiating team. Malley rejects the mainstream opinion that lays all blame for the failure on Arafat and the Palestinian delegation, also pointing a finger at the tactics of then-Israeli prime minister Ehud Barak.

In 2008, Malley argued that negotiations with the Palestinians had to include Hamas because the Palestine Liberation Organization (PLO) was no longer considered the Palestinian people's sole legitimate representative. He described the PLO as antiquated, worn out, barely functioning, and, because it did not include the broad Islamist views represented by Hamas, of questionable authority. Malley favored negotiating with Hamas for the purpose of a ceasefire, citing Hamas officials in Gaza who said they were prepared for an agreement with Israel. in support of efforts to implement an immediate end to Palestinian rocket launches and sniper fire, and a freeze on Israeli military attacks on Gaza, Malley claimed the blockade of the Gaza Strip had not stopped Hamas's rocket attacks on Israeli towns and had led to a lack of medicine, fuel, electricity and other essential commodities. In his view, a cease-fire would avoid "enormous loss of life, a generation of radicalized and embittered Gazans, and another bankrupt peace process."

Malley has published many articles calling upon the Israelis and the international community to bring Hamas to the negotiating table and ensure that any agreement reached will also be respected by Islamist groups. In addition, he has called to resume negotiations on all tracks based on the Arab Peace Initiative which promises full Arab recognition and normalization of relations with Israel.

In 2008, Malley stood out for his calls to engage in negotiations with Syria and Iran and for finding 'some kind of accommodation' with Hamas", The Jewish Daily Forward reported in February 2008.

=== Criticism ===
Malley was criticized after co-authoring an article in the July 8, 2001, edition of The New York Times arguing that the blame the failure of the 2000 Camp David Summit should be divided among all three leaders who were present at the summit, Arafat, Barak, and Bill Clinton, not just Arafat, as was suggested by some mainstream policy analysts. "Later, however, other scholars and former officials voiced similar views to those of Malley", according to a February 20, 2008, article in The Jewish Daily Forward.

Malley has also been criticized by Martin Peretz of The New Republic, who described Malley as "anti-Israel" and a "rabid hater of Israel." Peretz called several of his articles in the New York Review of Books "deceitful". On the conservative webzine The American Thinker, Ed Lasky asserted that Malley "represents the next generation of anti-Israel activism."

Malley told the Jewish Daily Forward that "it tends to cross the line when it becomes as personal and as un-based in facts as some of these have been". While he loved and respected his father, he said, their views sometimes differed, and it is "an odd guilt by association" fallacy to criticize him based on his father's views.

In response to what they called "vicious, personal attacks" on Malley, in February 2008, five former U.S. government officials, all of them Jewish — former National Security Advisor Sandy Berger, Ambassador Martin Indyk, Ambassador Daniel C. Kurtzer, Ambassador Dennis Ross, and former State Department Senior Advisor Aaron David Miller — published a letter in the New York Review of Books defending Malley. They wrote that the attacks on Malley were "unfair, inappropriate, and wrong", and objected to what they called an attempt "to undermine the credibility of a talented public servant who has worked tirelessly over the years to promote Arab–Israeli peace and US national interests." Their view was shared by M.J. Rosenberg, a former editor at the American Israel Public Affairs Committee and a critic of Israeli policies, who condemned the attacks on Malley, writing that Malley is "pro-Israel" and that the only reason he was being criticized was because he supports Israeli–Palestinian negotiations.

In October 2022, following a massive demonstration by Iranians in Berlin and elsewhere including Washington, D.C. in support of protests in Iran, Malley tweeted that "Marchers in Washington and cities around the world are showing their support for the Iranian people, who continue to peacefully demonstrate for their government to respect their dignity and human rights." He came under fire by Iranians and non-Iranians for undermining the protests in Iran to a mere demand for respect and some asked him to step down from his position. In response, he accepted that his words "were poorly worded". In his interview with Iran International, he stressed that ""It is not up to me; it is not up to the US government what the brave women and men who have been demonstrating in Iran want. It is up to them.". Despite Malley's apology, Masih Alinejad, Iranian-American journalist and human right activist started a petition to remove him from his post as Special US Envoy for Iran. The petition demanded that President Biden "appoint a new Special Envoy that the people in the U.S. and in Iran can trust and respect as a symbol of America's commitment to freedom and democracy."

== Selected publications ==
Books:

- Malley, Robert. The Call from Algeria: Third Worldism, Revolution, and the Turn to Islam. Berkeley: University of California Press (1996). ISBN 978-0-520-20301-3
- Agha, Hussein and Malley, Robert. Tomorrow Is Yesterday: Life, Death, and the Pursuit of Peace in Israel/Palestine. Farrar, Straus and Giroux (Sept 2025). ISBN 978-0374617127

Book chapters:

- Malley, Robert; Hufford, D. Brian. "THE WAR IN LEBANON: The Waxing and Waning of International Norms". From International Incidents: The Law That Counts in World Politics, W.M. Reisman & A.R. Willard (eds.), Princeton University Press.https://www.jstor.org/stable/j.ctt7zvwdr.11

Journal articles:

- Malley, Robert. "The Third Worldist Moment". Current History, Vol. 98, No. 631 (1999), pp. 359-369. https://www.jstor.org/stable/45318377
- Malley, Robert; Agha, Hussein. "The Last Negotiation: How to End the Middle East Peace Process". Foreign Affairs, Vol. 81, No. 3 (2002), pp. 10-18. https://www.jstor.org/stable/20033159
- Malley, Robert; Harling, Peter. "Beyond Moderates and Militants: How Obama Can Chart a New Course in the Middle East". Foreign Affairs, Vol. 89, No. 5 (2010), pp. 18-29. https://www.jstor.org/stable/20788642
- Malley, Robert; Finer, Jon. "The Long Shadow of 9/11: How Counterterrorism Warps U.S. Foreign Policy". Foreign Affairs, Vol. 97, No. 4 (2018), pp. 58-69. https://www.jstor.org/stable/44822213

== See also ==
- List of law clerks for the sixth seat of the Supreme Court of the United States
- Ariane Tabatabai
