= Missing Pieces =

Missing Pieces may refer to:

- Missing Pieces (TV series), an Australian factual television series
- Missing Pieces (Talk Talk album), 2001
- Missing Pieces (Autograph album), 1997
- Missing Pieces (Biffy Clyro album), 2009
- Missing Pieces (1992 film), a comedy film directed and written by Leonard Stern
- Missing Pieces (2000 film), an American made-for-television drama film
- Lost: Missing Pieces, a series of video clips from the television show Lost
- "Missing Pieces" (Agents of S.H.I.E.L.D.), an episode of Agents of S.H.I.E.L.D.
- Twin Peaks: The Missing Pieces, a 2014 compilation film by David Lynch
