= Taba Summit =

Talks between Israel and the Palestinian Authority

The Taba Summit (also known as Taba Talks) were talks between Israel and the Palestinian Authority, held from 21 to 27 January 2001 in Taba, Egypt. The talks took place during a political transition period. Israeli Prime Minister Ehud Barak had resigned six weeks previously on 9 December 2000, and elections were due on 6 February 2001, and the inauguration of President George W. Bush had taken place just one day prior, on 20 January 2001.

The Taba negotiations followed previous peace negotiation efforts, including the Oslo Accords (1993–1995) and the Camp David Summit (2000), which had failed to reach an agreement on key issues such as borders, Palestinian refugees, Israeli settlements in occupied territories, and Jerusalem.

The Taba negotiators hoped to address final status issues and bring an end to the Israeli–Palestinian conflict. According to a statement issued at the end of the talks, they came closer to this goal than in any previous peace talks. The talks ended on 27 January 2001 due to the upcoming Israeli election, and the new Ariel Sharon government did not restart them.

== Background ==
The Taba Summit took place from 21 to 27 January 2001 at Taba, after the failed Camp David 2000 Summit between Prime Minister of Israel Ehud Barak and the Palestinian President Yasser Arafat, and against the backdrop of the Second Intifada that commenced. The parties had first negotiated at Bolling Air Force Base in Washington, hosted by President Bill Clinton from 19 to 23 December 2000. The Israelis under Foreign Minister Shlomo Ben-Ami, the Palestinian under senior negotiator Saeb Erekat, Minister Yasser Abed Rabbo and Gaza security chief Mohammed Dahlan attended the meeting. President Clinton presented bridging proposals (the so-called "Clinton Parameters"). A summit in Sharm el-Sheikh, mediated by Egyptian President Hosni Mubarak, was planned on 28 December. As the Palestinians delayed their acceptance of the Clinton Parameters, Barak decided not to go.

== Positions ==
=== Israeli start positions ===
At the start of the Taba Summit, Israel held on three main points:

- no right of Palestinian refugees to return to inside the State of Israel
- no Palestinian sovereignty over the Temple Mount/Haram al-Sharif
- big settlement blocs (containing 80% of Jewish residents of the West Bank and Gaza) will be under Israeli sovereignty

=== The Moratinos non-paper ===
January 2001, the European Special Representative to the Middle East Process Miguel Moratinos presented a document, known as "The Moratinos non-paper," describing the outcome of the Taba negotiations. Although the paper has no official status, it has been acknowledged by the parties as being a relatively fair description of the outcome of the negotiations on the permanent status issues at Taba. It describes observed positions on the permanent status issues territory, Jerusalem, refugees and security, in order to find ways to come to joint positions. "At the same time it shows that there are serious gaps and differences between the two sides, which will have to be overcome in future negotiations." Summary of the paper:

==== Territory and permanent borders ====
The two sides agreed that in accordance with the UN Security Council Resolution 242, the 4 June 1967 lines would be the basis for the borders between Israel and the Palestinian state. Israel reduced its demands to 6% with territorial compensation that would offset about 3%, while the Palestinians proposed an Israeli annexation of about 3% along with a territorial compensation of the same amount. The Israeli proposal would have given the Palestinians some 97% of the land area of the West Bank.

===== West Bank =====
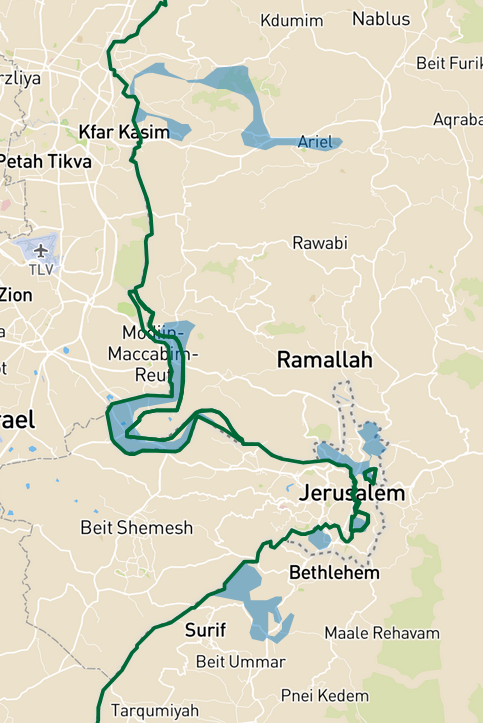
The Palestinian proposal at the Taba summit, according to the Economic Cooperation Foundation think-tank. The territory marked in blue was to be annexed by Israel.

Both sides presented their own maps of the West Bank. The maps served as a basis for the discussion on territory and settlements. The Israeli side presented two maps, and the Palestinian side engaged on this basis. The Palestinian side presented some illustrative maps detailing its understanding of Israeli interests in the West Bank. The Israeli side stated that the Clinton proposals provide for annexation of settlement blocs, areas which only had a small number of Palestinians. The Palestinian side did not agree that the parameters included blocs, and did not accept proposals to annex blocs. The Palestinian side stated that blocs would cause significant harm to the Palestinian interests and rights, particularly to the Palestinians residing in areas Israel sought to annex.

===== Gaza Strip =====
Neither side presented any maps of the Gaza Strip. It was implied that the Gaza Strip would be under total Palestinian sovereignty, but details still had to be worked out. All settlements would be evacuated. The Palestinian side claimed it could be arranged in 6 months, a timetable not agreed to by the Israeli side. Both sides agreed that there was going to be a safe passage from the north of Gaza (Beit Hanun) to the Hebron district, and that the West Bank and the Gaza Strip must be territorially linked.

==== Jerusalem ====
Both sides accepted in principle the Clinton suggestion of having a Palestinian sovereignty over Arab neighborhoods and an Israeli sovereignty over Jewish neighborhoods in Jerusalem. Both sides favored the idea of an open city. The Israeli side accepted that Jerusalem would be the capital of the two states: Yerushalaim, capital of Israel and Al-Quds, capital of the state of Palestine. Both parties accepted the principle of respective control over each side's respective holy sites. Israel's sovereignty over the Western Wall would be recognized although there remained a dispute regarding the delineation of the area covered by the Western Wall and especially the link to what is referred to in Clinton's ideas as the space sacred to Judaism of which it is part. Both sides agreed that the question of Haram al-Sharif/Temple Mount has not been resolved.

==== Refugees ====
Non-papers were exchanged which were regarded as a good basis for the talks. Both sides agreed to adopt the principles and references which could facilitate the adoption of an agreement. Both sides suggested, as a basis, that the parties should agree that a just settlement of the refugee problem in accordance with the UN Security Council Resolution 242 must lead to the implementation of UN General Assembly Resolution 194. The Israeli side expressed its understanding that the wish to return shall be implemented within the framework of one of the following programs:

A. Return and repatriation

1. to Israel
2. to Israeli swapped territory
3. to the Palestinian state

B. Rehabilitation and relocation

1. Rehabilitation in host country
2. Relocation to third country

Both sides agreed that UNRWA should be phased out in accordance with an agreed timetable of five years, as a targeted period.

The Israeli side requested that the issue of compensation to Jewish immigrants from Arab countries be recognized, while accepting that it was not a Palestinian responsibility or a bilateral issue. The Palestinian side raised the issue of restitution of refugee property. The Israeli side rejected this.

==== Security ====
1. The Israeli side requested to have 3 early warning stations on Palestinian territory.
2. The Israeli side maintained that the Palestinian state would be non-militarized as per the Clinton proposals. The Palestinian side was prepared to accept limitation on its acquisition of arms, and be defined as a state with limited arms.
3. The two sides recognized that the state of Palestine would have sovereignty over its airspace. The Israeli side agreed to accept and honor all Palestinian civil aviation rights according to international regulations, but sought a unified air control system under overriding Israel control. In addition, Israel requested access to Palestinian airspace for military operations and training.
4. The Israeli side agreed to a withdrawal from the West Bank over a 36-month period with an additional 36 months for the Jordan Valley in conjunction with an international force. The Palestinian side rejected a 36-month withdrawal process from the West Bank expressing concern that a lengthy process would exacerbate Palestinian-Israeli tensions.
5. The Israeli side requested to maintain and operate five emergency locations on potentially Palestinian territory (in the Jordan Valley) with the Palestinian response allowing for maximum of two emergency locations conditional on a time limit for the dismantling. The Palestinian side declined to agree to the deployment of Israeli armed forces on Palestinian territory during emergency situations, but was prepared to consider ways in which international forces might be used in that capacity, particularly within the context of regional security cooperation efforts.
6. Both sides were prepared to commit themselves to promoting security cooperation and fighting terror.
7. The Palestinian side was confident that Palestinian sovereignty over borders and international crossing points would be recognized in the agreement.

=== Positions mentioned in other sources ===
Israel wanted to keep military control over Palestinian land and airspace in states of emergency, not because of a possible future threat from Palestine, but because of possible other threats from the East. The Palestinians wanted to accept international forces only.

The Palestinians could not accept Israeli annexation of Giv'at Ze'ev and Ma'ale Adumim in the Jerusalem area. Israel wanted future expansion of the settlements into the West Bank. Unlike the Palestinians, Israel did not consider East Jerusalem part of the West Bank and its Israeli inhabitants settlers.

== End of the negotiations ==
=== Official statement ===
The Taba Summit officially ended with a joint statement, which included some of the following points:

The Israeli and Palestinian delegations conducted ... deep and practical talks with the aim of reaching a permanent and stable agreement between the two parties. ... Given the circumstances and time constraints, it proved impossible to reach understandings on all issues, despite the substantial progress that was achieved in each of the issues discussed. ... The sides declare that they have never been closer to reaching an agreement and it is thus our shared belief that the remaining gaps could be bridged with the resumption of negotiations following the Israeli elections. The two sides take upon themselves to return to normalcy and to establish [a] security situation on the ground through the observation of their mutual commitments in the spirit of the Sharm e-Sheikh memorandum. The negotiation teams discussed four main themes: refugees, security, borders and Jerusalem, with a goal to reach a permanent agreement that will bring an end to the conflict between them and provide peace to both people. ... The Taba talks conclude an extensive phase in the Israeli–Palestinian permanent status negotiations with a sense of having succeeded in rebuilding trust between the sides. ... The two sides express their gratitude to President Hosni Mubarak. ... They also express their thanks to the European Union. ... The sides declare that they have never been closer to reaching an agreement and it is thus our shared belief that the remaining gaps could be bridged with the resumption of negotiations following the Israeli elections. ..."

=== Reasons for impasse ===
The breakdown is often attributed to the political circumstances posed by Israeli elections and changeover in leadership in the United States: They had run out of political time. They could not conclude an agreement with Clinton now out of office and Barak standing for reelection in two weeks. Israel's negotiator Shlomo Ben-Ami said that "We made progress, substantial progress. We are closer than ever to the possibility of striking a final deal". Palestinian chief negotiator Saeb Erekat also lamented the lack of a final agreement. "My heart aches because I know we were so close. We need six more weeks to conclude the drafting of the agreement."

=== Sharon Government's negation of the talks ===
The following month the Likud party candidate Ariel Sharon defeated Ehud Barak in the Israeli elections and was elected as Israeli prime minister on 6 February 2001. Sharon's new government chose not to resume the high-level talks. Immediately after the elections and before the change of government, an 8 February 2001 statement published by the Israeli Ministry of Foreign Affairs stated that:

Prime Minister and Defense Minister Ehud Barak clarified this evening that the ideas which were brought up in the course of the recent negotiations conducted with the Chairman of the Palestinian Authority, including those raised at the Camp David Summit and by President Clinton towards the end of his term in office, are not binding on the new government to be formed in Israel. In a letter to President George Bush, Prime Minister Barak stated that his government had done the utmost to bring about an end to the Israeli–Palestinian conflict, but that these efforts did not bear fruit, primarily because of a lack of sufficient readiness for compromise on the part of the Palestinian leadership. ... Before sending the letter, Barak spoke with former President Clinton, and they were in agreement that the ideas raised in the past months are not binding on the new government in Israel. Prime Minister Barak intends to convey this position also to the heads of the European Union and to chairman Arafat.

=== Arafat accepts Taba peace plan ===
In June 2002, approximately 18 months after the conclusion of the Taba Summit, Palestinian leader Yasser Arafat gave an interview to the Israeli newspaper Haaretz, in which he stated that he had accepted the Middle East peace plan proposed by Bill Clinton. However, by that time, the new Israeli government emphasized that this offer was no longer under consideration.

== See also ==
- List of Middle East peace proposals
