= Aton =

Aton, ATON or variants thereof may refer to:

== People and characters ==
=== Persons ===
- Aton Ben-Horin (born 1979), American music executive and record producer
- Aton Edwards (born c. 1962), American expert in the fields of emergency preparedness, self-reliance and sustainable living
- Ayé Aton, American painter, designer, muralist, musician and educator born Robert Underwood (1940–2017)
- Jim Aton (1925–2008), American jazz bassist, pianist, vocalist and composer
- Baron Aton, a former title in the Peerage of England
- Sir Gilbert Aton (died 1350), English magnate
- Sir William Aton (died 1389), English magnate
- Aton : French actor

=== Characters and figures ===
- Aten or Aton, the disk of the sun, regarded as a deity in ancient Egyptian religion
- Aton, a character in the game Kya Dark Lineage
- Aton, protagonist in a series of novels by Piers Anthony

== Businesses ==
- Aton LLC, a Russian investment bank
- Aton Resources, a Canadian mining company
- ATON GmbH, parent company of EDAG (Engineering + Design AG)

== Acronym ==
- Aid to navigation (AtoN)
- Uysal–Walker Archive of Turkish Oral Narrative at Texas Tech University

== Other uses ==
- aton, a type of song in Inuit music
- Aechmea 'Aton', a cultivar

== See also ==
- a ton (measurement)
- Aiton (disambiguation)
- Aten (disambiguation)
