= Coesfeld – Steinfurt II =

Federal electoral district of Germany

126 Coesfeld – Steinfurt II
- Electoral district for the Bundestag
- Coesfeld – Steinfurt II in 2025
- State: North Rhine-Westphalia
- Population: 247,300 (2019)
- Electorate: 194,695 (2021)
- Major settlements: Dülmen; Coesfeld; Lüdinghausen
- Area: 1,261.9 km^{2}

Current electoral district
- Created: 1965
- Party: CDU
- Member: Marc Henrichmann
- Elected: 2017, 2021, 2025

Coesfeld – Steinfurt II is an electoral constituency (German: Wahlkreis) represented in the Bundestag. It elects one member via first-past-the-post voting. Under the current constituency numbering system, it is designated as constituency 126. It is located in northern North Rhine-Westphalia, comprising the Coesfeld district and southwestern parts of the Steinfurt district.

Coesfeld – Steinfurt II was created for the 1965 federal election. Since 2017, it has been represented by Marc Henrichmann of the Christian Democratic Union (CDU).

== Geography ==
Coesfeld – Steinfurt II is located in northern North Rhine-Westphalia. As of the 2021 federal election, it comprises the entirety of the Coesfeld district and the municipalities of Altenberge, Laer, and Nordwalde from the Steinfurt district.

== History ==
Coesfeld – Steinfurt II was created in 1965 and contained parts of the abolished constituencies of Lüdinghausen – Coesfeld and Steinfurt – Tecklenburg. Originally, it was known as Steinfurt – Coesfeld. From 1980 through 1998, it was named Coesfeld – Steinfurt I. It acquired its current name in the 2002 election. In the 1965 through 1976 elections, it was constituency 96 in the numbering system. From 1980 through 1998, it was number 97. From 2002 through 2009, it was number 128. In the 2013 through 2021 elections, it was number 127. From the 2025 election, it has been number 126.

Originally, the constituency comprised the entirety of the Coesfeld and Steinfurt districts. In the 1980 through 1998 elections, it comprised the Coesfeld district and western parts of the Steinfurt district. It acquired its current borders in the 2002 election.

Election	No.	Name	Borders
1965	96	Steinfurt – Coesfeld	Coesfeld district; Steinfurt district
1969	96	Steinfurt – Coesfeld	Coesfeld district; Steinfurt district
1972	96	Steinfurt – Coesfeld	Coesfeld district; Steinfurt district
1976	96	Steinfurt – Coesfeld	Coesfeld district; Steinfurt district
1980	97	Coesfeld – Steinfurt I	Coesfeld district; Steinfurt district (only western parts)
1983	97	Coesfeld – Steinfurt I	Coesfeld district; Steinfurt district (only western parts)
1987	97	Coesfeld – Steinfurt I	Coesfeld district; Steinfurt district (only western parts)
1990	97	Coesfeld – Steinfurt I	Coesfeld district; Steinfurt district (only western parts)
1994	97	Coesfeld – Steinfurt I	Coesfeld district; Steinfurt district (only western parts)
1998	97	Coesfeld – Steinfurt I	Coesfeld district; Steinfurt district (only western parts)
2002	128	Coesfeld – Steinfurt II	Coesfeld district; Steinfurt district (only Altenberge, Laer, and Nordwalde municipalities)
2005	128	Coesfeld – Steinfurt II	Coesfeld district; Steinfurt district (only Altenberge, Laer, and Nordwalde municipalities)
2009	128	Coesfeld – Steinfurt II	Coesfeld district; Steinfurt district (only Altenberge, Laer, and Nordwalde municipalities)
2013	127	Coesfeld – Steinfurt II	Coesfeld district; Steinfurt district (only Altenberge, Laer, and Nordwalde municipalities)
2017	127	Coesfeld – Steinfurt II	Coesfeld district; Steinfurt district (only Altenberge, Laer, and Nordwalde municipalities)
2021	127	Coesfeld – Steinfurt II	Coesfeld district; Steinfurt district (only Altenberge, Laer, and Nordwalde municipalities)
2025	126	Coesfeld – Steinfurt II	Coesfeld district; Steinfurt district (only Altenberge, Laer, and Nordwalde municipalities)

== Members ==
The constituency has been held continuously by the Christian Democratic Union (CDU) since its creation. It was first represented by Heinrich Hörnemann from 1965 to 1969. Gottfried Köster then served as representative from 1969 to 1980. Wilhelm Rawe served from 1980 to 1994, followed by Werner Lensing from 1994 to 2005. Karl Schiewerling served from then until 2017. Marc Henrichmann was elected in 2017 and re-elected in 2021 and 2025.

Election	Member	Party	%
1965	Heinrich Hörnemann	CDU	67.5
1969	Gottfried Köster	CDU	63.6
1972	Gottfried Köster	CDU	59.0
1976	Gottfried Köster	CDU	60.4
1980	Wilhelm Rawe	CDU	59.3
1983	Wilhelm Rawe	CDU	65.5
1987	Wilhelm Rawe	CDU	58.4
1990	Wilhelm Rawe	CDU	56.9
1994	Werner Lensing	CDU	52.8
1998	Werner Lensing	CDU	50.3
2002	Werner Lensing	CDU	49.3
2005	Karl Schiewerling	CDU	51.6
2009	Karl Schiewerling	CDU	50.8
2013	Karl Schiewerling	CDU	56.1
2017	Marc Henrichmann	CDU	51.6
2021	Marc Henrichmann	CDU	40.9
2025	Marc Henrichmann	CDU	45.6

== Election results ==
=== 2025 election ===
Federal election (2025): Coesfeld – Steinfurt II
Notes:	Blue background denotes the winner of the electorate vote. Pink background denotes a candidate elected from their party list. Yellow background denotes an electorate win by a list member, or other incumbent. A ✓ or ✗ denotes status of any incumbent, win or lose respectively.						
Party	Candidate	Votes	%	±%	Party votes	%	±%
CDU	✓ Marc Henrichmann	76,819	45.6	▲4.7	67,891	40.2	▲5.7
SPD	Johannes Waldmann	34,152	20.3	▼4.8	30,231	17.9	▼8.7
Greens	Hanna Hüwe	21,571	12.8	▼4.1	22,841	13.5	▼2.4
AfD	Erwin Schwar	20,615	12.2	▲7.7	21,368	12.6	▲8.1
Left	Sonja Crämer-Gembalczyk	7,708	4.6	▲1.9	9,221	5.5	▲2.9
FDP	Sebastian Loest	5,338	3.2	▼4.6	7,159	4.2	▼7.0
BSW					4,776	2.8	
Volt	DIana Diel	2,326	1.4		1,143	0.7	▲0.4
Tierschutzpartei					1,664	1.0	0.0
PARTEI					777	0.5	▼0.4
FW				▼1.2	766	0.5	▼0.2
PdF					346	0.2	▲0.2
dieBasis				▼1.0	271	0.2	▼0.6
Team Todenhöfer					177	0.1	▼0.1
BD					164	0.1	
Values					83	0.0	
MERA25					27	0.0	
MLPD					18	0.0	0.0
Pirates							▼0.4
Gesundheitsforschung							▼0.1
ÖDP							▼0.1
Humanists							▼0.1
Bündnis C							0.0
SGP						0.0	0.0
Informal votes		1,142			748		
Total valid votes		168,529			168,923		
Turnout		169,671	87.4	▲4.7			
CDU hold	Majority	42,667	25.3				

=== 2021 election ===
Federal election (2021): Coesfeld – Steinfurt II
Notes:	Blue background denotes the winner of the electorate vote. Pink background denotes a candidate elected from their party list. Yellow background denotes an electorate win by a list member, or other incumbent. A ✓ or ✗ denotes status of any incumbent, win or lose respectively.						
Party	Candidate	Votes	%	±%	Party votes	%	±%
CDU	✓ Marc Henrichmann	65,402	40.9	▼10.7	55,230	34.5	▼9.6
SPD	Johannes Waldmann	40,145	25.1	▲1.6	42,647	26.6	▲5.6
Greens	Anne-Monika Spallek	27,069	16.9	▲8.7	25,506	15.9	▲8.4
FDP	René Arning	12,409	7.8	▼2.7	17,927	11.2	▼2.4
AfD	Leonhard Martin	7,241	4.5		7,339	4.6	▼1.5
Left	Klaus Stegemann	4,242	2.7	▼3.6	4,093	2.6	▼2.8
Tierschutzpartei					1,595	1.0	▲0.5
PARTEI					1,348	0.8	▲0.3
FW	Stephan Heitbaum	1,858	1.2		998	0.6	▲0.5
dieBasis	Heinz Eul	1,580	1.0		1,184	0.7	
Pirates					580	0.4	0.0
Volt					408	0.3	
Team Todenhöfer					262	0.2	
Gesundheitsforschung					179	0.1	0.0
LIEBE					152	0.1	
LfK					151	0.1	
NPD					121	0.1	▼0.1
ÖDP					101	0.1	▼0.1
Humanists					83	0.1	0.0
V-Partei3					79	0.0	0.0
Bündnis C					51	0.0	
du.					45	0.0	
PdF					42	0.0	
LKR					30	0.0	
DKP					18	0.0	0.0
MLPD					8	0.0	0.0
SGP					5	0.0	0.0
Informal votes		1,118			882		
Total valid votes		159,946			160,182		
Turnout		161,064	82.7	▲1.5			
CDU hold	Majority	25,257	15.8	▼12.3			

=== 2017 election ===
Federal election (2017): Coesfeld – Steinfurt II
Notes:	Blue background denotes the winner of the electorate vote. Pink background denotes a candidate elected from their party list. Yellow background denotes an electorate win by a list member, or other incumbent. A ✓ or ✗ denotes status of any incumbent, win or lose respectively.						
Party	Candidate	Votes	%	±%	Party votes	%	±%
CDU	Marc Henrichmann	79,677	51.6	▼4.4	68,636	44.0	▼6.1
SPD	Ulrich Hampel	36,250	23.5	▼3.3	32,787	21.0	▼4.6
FDP	Daniel Fahr	16,195	10.5	▲7.9	21,116	13.6	▲7.9
Greens	Friedrich Ostendorff	12,680	8.2	▲1.2	11,667	7.5	▼0.7
AfD					9,496	6.1	▲3.3
Left	Gernod Röken	9,577	6.2	▲2.9	8,394	5.4	▲1.2
Tierschutzpartei					839	0.5	
PARTEI					841	0.5	▲0.2
Pirates					495	0.3	▼1.4
FW					248	0.2	0.0
NPD					233	0.1	▼0.4
ÖDP					178	0.1	0.0
DiB					150	0.1	
Gesundheitsforschung					139	0.1	
DM					130	0.1	
V-Partei³					113	0.1	
Volksabstimmung					110	0.1	0.0
BGE					84	0.1	
Die Humanisten					65	0.0	
AD-DEMOKRATEN					50	0.0	
MLPD					31	0.0	0.0
DKP					17	0.0	
SGP					7	0.0	0.0
Informal votes		2,434			987		
Total valid votes		154,379			155,826		
Turnout		156,813	81.3	▲2.7			
CDU hold	Majority	43,427	28.1	▼1.2			

=== 2013 election ===
Federal election (2013): Coesfeld – Steinfurt II
Notes:	Blue background denotes the winner of the electorate vote. Pink background denotes a candidate elected from their party list. Yellow background denotes an electorate win by a list member, or other incumbent. A ✓ or ✗ denotes status of any incumbent, win or lose respectively.						
Party	Candidate	Votes	%	±%	Party votes	%	±%
CDU	✓ Karl Schiewerling	83,175	56.1	▲5.3	74,391	50.1	▲7.5
SPD	Ulrich Hampel	39,724	26.8	▲0.7	38,075	25.6	▲3.8
Greens	Friedrich Ostendorff	10,346	7.0	▼0.4	12,083	8.1	▼1.2
Left	Ali Atalan	4,929	3.3	▼1.9	6,167	4.2	▼1.7
FDP	Daniel Fahr	3,826	2.6	▼7.2	8,328	5.6	▼10.9
AfD	Dorothe van Suntum	3,036	2.0		4,216	2.8	
Pirates	Ulrich Schumacher	2,884	1.9		2,605	1.8	▲0.4
NPD					812	0.5	0.0
PARTEI					472	0.3	
FAMILIE	Hubert Töllers	461	0.3				
FW					267	0.2	
PRO					243	0.2	
ÖDP					188	0.1	0.0
Volksabstimmung					171	0.1	▲0.1
REP					110	0.1	▼0.1
Nichtwahler					101	0.1	
Party of Reason					96	0.1	
RRP					64	0.0	▼0.1
PSG					29	0.0	0.0
MLPD					22	0.0	0.0
BIG					18	0.0	
BüSo					14	0.0	0.0
Die Rechte					13	0.0	
Informal votes		1,297			1,193		
Total valid votes		148,381			148,485		
Turnout		149,678	78.5	▲1.2			
CDU hold	Majority	43,453	29.3	▲4.6			

=== 2009 election ===
Federal election (2009): Coesfeld – Steinfurt II
Notes:	Blue background denotes the winner of the electorate vote. Pink background denotes a candidate elected from their party list. Yellow background denotes an electorate win by a list member, or other incumbent. A ✓ or ✗ denotes status of any incumbent, win or lose respectively.						
Party	Candidate	Votes	%	±%	Party votes	%	±%
CDU	✓ Karl Schiewerling	73,636	50.8	▼0.8	61,901	42.6	▼2.3
SPD	Angelica Schwall-Düren	37,851	26.1	▼10.2	31,790	21.9	▼9.6
FDP	Daniel Fahr	14,229	9.8	▲5.2	24,041	16.5	▲5.6
Greens	Jutta Bergmoser	10,674	7.4	▲3.3	13,607	9.4	▲2.2
Left	Bernhard Perrefort	7,634	5.3	▲2.4	8,504	5.9	▲2.3
Pirates					2,008	1.4	
NPD	Nicole Elisabeth Rohde	973	0.7	▲0.1	752	0.5	0.0
Tierschutzpartei					705	0.5	▲0.1
FAMILIE					703	0.5	▲0.1
RENTNER					424	0.3	
REP					213	0.1	▼0.1
RRP					169	0.1	
ÖDP					163	0.1	
Centre					93	0.1	0.0
Volksabstimmung					80	0.1	0.0
DVU					67	0.0	
PSG					20	0.0	0.0
BüSo					16	0.0	0.0
MLPD					13	0.0	0.0
Informal votes		1,372			1,100		
Total valid votes		144,997			145,269		
Turnout		146,369	77.3	▼5.8			
CDU hold	Majority	36,785	24.7	▲9.4			

=== 2005 election ===
Federal election (2005): Coesfeld – Steinfurt II
Notes:	Blue background denotes the winner of the electorate vote. Pink background denotes a candidate elected from their party list. Yellow background denotes an electorate win by a list member, or other incumbent. A ✓ or ✗ denotes status of any incumbent, win or lose respectively.						
Party	Candidate	Votes	%	±%	Party votes	%	±%
CDU	Karl Schiewerling	78,626	51.6	▲2.3	68,520	44.9	▲0.3
SPD	Angelica Schwall-Düren	55,269	36.3	▼1.3	48,019	31.5	▼2.6
FDP	Michael Große Verspohl	6,988	4.6	▼2.7	16,758	11.0	▲0.1
Greens	Moritz Hegemann	6,224	4.1	▼1.1	10,865	7.1	▼0.9
Left	Frank Steinkamp	4,387	2.9	▲2.2	5,381	3.5	▲2.8
NPD	Erwin Kemna	919	0.6		777	0.5	▼0.3
Familie					660	0.4	▲0.2
Tierschutzpartei					591	0.4	▲0.1
GRAUEN					394	0.3	▲0.1
REP					307	0.2	
From Now on... Democracy Through Referendum					111	0.1	
PBC					75	0.0	
Centre					63	0.0	
Socialist Equality Party					49	0.0	
BüSo					17	0.0	
MLPD					20	0.0	0.0
Informal votes		1,674			1,480		
Total valid votes		152,413			152,607		
Turnout		154,087	83.1	▼1.6			
CDU hold	Majority	23,357	15.3				
