= Mark Wallace =

American businessman, former diplomat

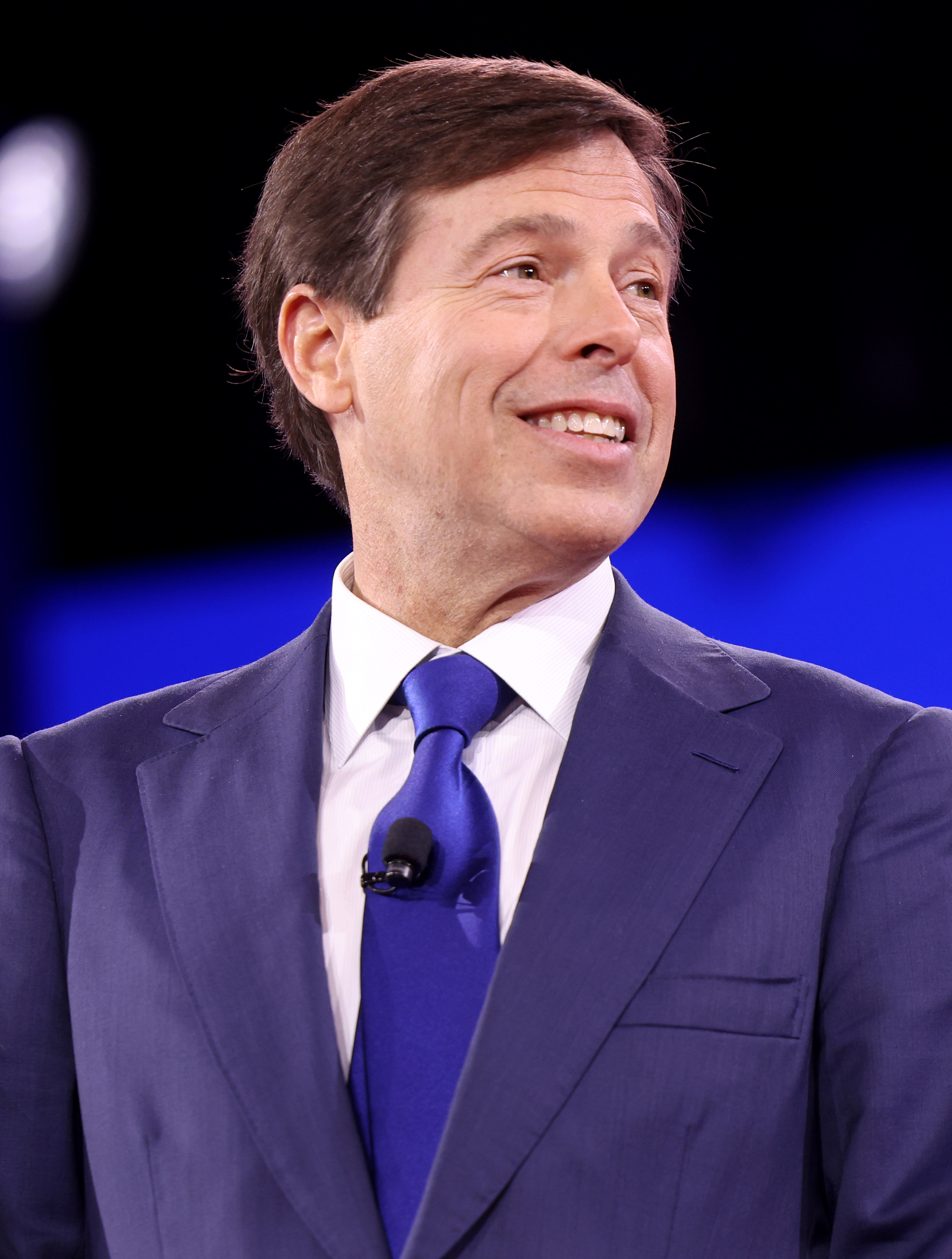

United States Ambassador to the United Nations for Management and Reform
- In office 2006–2009
- President: George W. Bush
- Preceded by: Patrick F. Kennedy

Personal details
- Born: Mark David Wallace; December 31, 1967 (age 58) Miami, Florida, U.S.
- Spouse: Nicolle Wallace (m. 2005; div. 2019)
- Children: 1
- Education: University of Miami (BA, JD)
- Occupation: CEO of United Against Nuclear Iran; Counter Extremism Project; Turkish Democracy Project and PaykanArtCar.

Mark David Wallace (born December 31, 1967) is an American businessman, former diplomat, and lawyer who has had a variety of government, political, and private sector posts. He served in several positions during the administration of President George W. Bush, including as the United States Ambassador to the United Nations for UN Management and Reform. As of 2019, Wallace was the CEO of United Against Nuclear Iran (UANI), the Counter Extremism Project (CEP), and the Turkish Democracy Project.

== Biography ==
Wallace attended the University of Miami, where he received both his bachelor's degree and J.D. He was married to Nicolle Wallace, a political commentator who was President George W. Bush's communications director and as senior advisor to Senator John McCain's 2008 presidential bid.

== Career ==
Prior to government service, Wallace was a practicing commercial litigation attorney in Miami, Florida as well as General Counsel of the State of Florida's City of Miami Emergency Financial Oversight Board. He began his political career under Florida Governor Jeb Bush and was active in his election campaigns in 1994, 1998 and 2002.

In 2000, Wallace played a key role working for then Governor George W. Bush's legal team in the decisive Florida recount in 2000 where he was counsel to the campaign in Florida and was a spokesman for the legal team in various national media outlets. Wallace was portrayed in the HBO movie Recount for his role in the disputed presidential contest.

During President Bush's administration from 2001 to 2003, Wallace served in a variety of federal government general counsel positions. At the Federal Emergency Management Agency (FEMA), he oversaw and managed all aspects of the FEMA Office of General Counsel, and acted as counsel to the FEMA-led New York and World Trade Center recovery effort in the wake of the 2001 September 11 attacks. He also was the general counsel of the U.S. Department of Justice (DOJ), Immigration and Naturalization Service (INS), during the INS' transition from the DOJ into the Department of Homeland Security (DHS) as part of the Homeland Security Act of 2002 reorganization. After the reorganization, Wallace was the first principal legal advisor to the Bureau of Immigration and Customs Enforcement and the Bureau of Citizenship and Immigration Services for the Department of Homeland Security.

In 2003, Wallace joined President George W. Bush's reelection campaign as the deputy campaign manager. In addition to his day-to-day responsibilities of assisting in the management of the national campaign, Wallace was the campaign's lead liaison to the Republican National Convention, the campaign's representative in debate negotiations, and led the campaign's debate team at each of the presidential and vice presidential debates.

In February 2013, Wallace and his wife publicly supported legal recognition for same-sex marriage in an amicus brief submitted to the U.S. Supreme Court.

=== UN ambassadorship ===
In 2005, President Bush nominated Wallace to serve in the United States Department of State, United States Mission to the United Nations as Ambassador, U.S. Representative for UN Management and Reform, and Alternative Representative of the United States to Sessions of the General Assembly of the United Nations. The Senate confirmed his appointment in 2006.

During his tenure as Ambassador to the United Nations, Wallace most notably sought to uncover corruption in UN programs in such places as North Korea and Burma. He exposed the "Cash for Kim" corruption scandal in North Korea. He revealed, among other issues, that the United Nations Development Programme (UNDP) had funneled millions of dollars in hard currency to North Korea without assurance that North Korea's dictatorship would use the money to help the North Korean people instead of diverting it to illicit activities, including the country's illegal nuclear program. Wallace accused the program of being "systematically perverted for the benefit of the Kim Jong Il regime," and the media drew parallels between UNDP's corruption in North Korea and the Oil-for-Food scandal in Iraq several years earlier. The Wall Street Journal wrote that the finding of the Cash for Kim investigation "vindicates" Wallace, "who led the charge for transparency at UNDP."

In addition, he led the U.S. delegation's "no" vote against using UN money to pay for the 2009 "Durban II" conference, describing it as "noxious to my country and a disgrace in the International Community." He further opposed the 2008–2009 UN Biennium Budget for its "ad hoc" and "piecemeal" approach that ensured spending increases in the UN general budget that far outpaced the general budget increases of member states.

While at the UN, Wallace also launched the UN Transparency and Accountability Initiative that focused on eight areas of reform related to member states' access to UN financial documents, ethics, financial disclosure, oversight mechanisms, IPSAS accounting standards and administrative overhead.

Upon his departure from the U.S. State Department, The Wall Street Journal editorial board compared Wallace to a list of "distinguished" Americans who tried to make the United Nations live up to its original ideals, including Daniel Patrick Moynihan, Jeane Kirkpatrick and John Bolton. The opinion piece noted that although Wallace was unpopular with some officials who didn't want to risk their engagement with North Korea over corruption, "he's the one who had it right."

=== 2008 presidential campaign ===
During the 2008 presidential campaign, Wallace was a senior advisor to Senator John McCain. In that role, he led the debate preparation team for Senator McCain's running mate, Alaska Governor Sarah Palin. After the debate, The New York Times commented that Governor Palin's debate performance against Democrat Joe Biden "exceeded expectations in this highly anticipated face-off, though those expectations were low after she had stumbled in recent television interviews." Wallace was portrayed in the HBO movie Game Change by actor Ron Livingston for his work on the McCain campaign.

=== Policy work, writing, and media appearances ===
Wallace is the chief executive officer of both United Against Nuclear Iran (UANI) and the Counter Extremism Project (CEP). He is a frequent media contributor and op-ed author and has been featured in news outlets around the world, including The Wall Street Journal, The New York Times, Financial Times, The Washington Post, CNN, Fox News, USA Today, TIME, The Huffington Post, New York Post, CNBC, Asharq Al-Awsat, Okaz, Le Parisien, and Die Welt.

=== United Against Nuclear Iran ===
Wallace is chief executive officer of United Against Nuclear Iran (UANI), a bipartisan non-profit dedicated to prevent Iran from producing nuclear weapons. Wallace founded UANI in 2008 alongside the late Richard Holbrooke and Dennis Ross. In August 2015, former Connecticut Senator Joe Lieberman became chairman of the group. Under Wallace, UANI and its advisory board has grown to include prominent former government officials and lawmakers including former U.S. Homeland Security Advisor Fran Townsend, former Mossad Chiefs Meir Dagan and Tamir Pardo, former head of the German Intelligence Service Dr. August Hanning, former head of the British MI6 Chief Sir Richard Dearlove, and former governors Jeb Bush and Bill Richardson, among others. In August 2013, Iranian Foreign Minister Mohammad Javad Zarif described UANI as "the biggest active lobby against Iran." The following month, in his debut speech before the UN General Assembly, Iranian President Hassan Rouhani was further critical of UANI, labeling it "extremist," and proposed a new group called "World Against Violence and Extremism" – in reference to United Against Nuclear Iran.

Since its founding, Wallace has led UANI in launching campaigns warning more than 1,000 companies of their Iran business ties, following which, dozens of multinational firms such as General Electric, Huntsman, Caterpillar, Ingersoll Rand, Porsche, Hyundai, Fiat, Royal Dutch Shell, Terex and Siemens ended their business dealings in Iran. Wallace and UANI led the first successful campaign to convince a Chinese company to end its work in Iran. After various discussions between Wallace, UANI and Huawei, the company announced that it was scaling back its business in Iran. The decision by Huawei and the role of UANI was prominently featured in the news media including The Wall Street Journal, Financial Times and Reuters. In The Wall Street Journal piece, Wallace was quoted saying of the decision: "This is a significant milestone. For the first time a major Chinese business is pulling back from Iran in the face of mounting international scorn for Iran's brutal regime."

Wallace and UANI launched a campaign calling on SWIFT to terminate its relationships with Iran's banks and financial institutions, arguing that SWIFT was in violation of U.S. and EU sanctions by affording Iranian banks BICs and access to SWIFT and, therefore, access to the international financial system. Subsequently, SWIFT announced that it would comply with new EU sanctions and cease providing messaging services to sanction designated Iranian banks. "It's a good positive step forward and it will cause real difficulties for the regime," said Wallace. SWIFT's decision and UANI's campaign were extensively covered in media outlets around the world.

UANI and Wallace pursued a successful "Auto Campaign" that has focused on the lucrative Iranian automobile industry. UANI has called on international automobile manufactures to leave Iran including, among others, Nissan, Fiat, Peugeot, GM and Hyundai.

Wallace and UANI have authored and supported a variety of federal and state legislative and regulatory initiatives designed to enhance Iran's economic isolation. Their model legislation has been incorporated into both federal bills and state bills, including the Comprehensive Iran Sanctions, Accountability, and Divestment Act of 2010 (CISADA), the Iran Transparency and Accountability Act (ITAA), the Iran Financial Sanctions Improvement Act of 2012 (H.R. 4179 as introduced by Chairwoman Ileana Ros-Lehtinen and Congressman Brad Sherman), California's Iran Contracting Act of 2010 (AB1650) and New York's Iran Divestment Act of 2011 (A08668) among others. In May 2012, Wallace along with Meir Dagan, August Hanning, R. James Woolsey, Lord Charles Guthrie and Kristen Silverberg co-authored an op-ed in The Wall Street Journal calling for "the most robust sanctions against Iran in history" as a means "for the international community to truly isolate the regime." Wallace described a proposed strategy to implement such sanctions during testimony before the U.S. House Committee on Foreign Affairs on May 17, 2012, by proposing legislation focused on four areas, namely Banking, Insurance and Reinsurance, Disclosure and Debarment and Shipping (UANI BIDS) in order to achieve an "economic blockade" of Iran.

In an October 2012 profile on UANI in NBC News by chief foreign correspondent Richard Engel and Robert Windrem, Wallace stated, "Our message is clear: You have to choose between doing business with our checkbook or their checkbook—with the reality being we're the biggest checkbook in the world. Notwithstanding the purported demise of the United States, we're still the biggest checkbook in the world."

Wallace and UANI advocated against the Joint Comprehensive Plan of Action (JCPOA) nuclear agreement between the P5+1 and Iran. In the New York Times, Wallace said, "Americans have been presented with a false choice: diplomacy or war," in a cynical effort to frame opponents of the deal as warmongers.

Following the implementation of the JCPOA, UANI launched an educational and advocacy campaign calling on international companies not to do business in Iran. In the Financial Times, Wallace said, "As they get on a plane to Tehran, companies need to have a hard look at the business risk… The risk profile has not fundamentally changed." In November 2015, UANI published an open letter in the Financial Times signed by dozens of prominent defense and foreign policy experts calling on the global business community to consider the substantial risks of business ties in Iran. By July 2016, Politico reported that within the past six months, UANI had sent more than 200 letters to companies exploring or engaged in business in Iran. Wallace commented, "We wanted to professionally and thoroughly spread the word ... of the enormous risk still associated with Iran."

In June 2016, UANI released an open letter signed by high-ranking former government officials and policy experts calling on the Financial Action Task Force (FATF) to keep Iran on its blacklist and "maintain and strengthen counter-measures against Iran" as a threat to the integrity of the international financial system for its rampant money laundering and terrorism financing activities.

On September 19, 2016, UANI hosted an "Iran Risk Summit," examining the political and economic environment since the signing of the JCPOA. The event featured prominent Middle Eastern officials, including UAE Ambassador to the U.S. Yousef Al Otaiba, Israeli lawmaker and former Foreign Minister Tzipi Livni, and Bahraini diplomat and former President of the United Nations General Assembly Haya Rashed Al-Khalifa.

In February 2019, Russian Foreign Ministry spokeswoman Maria Zakharova accused UANI of trying to "intimidate Russian business" interests in Iran. National Security Advisor of the United States John Bolton consequently came to the defense of UANI, calling attempts by the Russian government to intimidate Wallace and UANI "unacceptable." He added, "If President Putin is serious about stabilizing the Middle East, confronting terrorism & preventing a nuclear arms race in the region, he should stand with UANI & against Iran."

In 2019, Iran added UANI to its list of terrorist organizations. The decision was announced by Iran's Foreign Ministry. The listing took effect on the day before the International Convention for the Future of Iran, which the UANI helped facilitate. Numerous Iranian opposition groups participated. It was attended by Secretary of State Mike Pompeo.

Wallace also is on the board of advisors of the Nonproliferation Policy Education Center.

==== Litigation ====
In May 2013, UANI publicly called on a Greek shipping concern and its owner to end their purported business relationships with the Iranian regime. In response, Wallace and UANI were sued for defamation and other related torts in Manhattan Federal court. Wallace and UANI maintained that the suit was baseless and designed to muzzle UANI's campaign against companies that assisted or financed Iran's efforts to evade international sanctions and to obtain nuclear weapons. In what UANI deemed an effort to buy its silence, the Greek shipper reportedly "offered to pay UANI $400,000 and to appoint Wallace to the board" of an affiliated tanker management company. Wallace and UANI's legal representatives rejected the offer. In July 2014, the United States Attorney for the Southern District of New York intervened in the lawsuit to block the Greek plaintiffs from seeking discovery from Wallace and UANI. In September 2014, the U.S. Justice Department intervened in the suit and invoked the "state secrets privilege" to seek dismissal of the Greek shipper's claims because "an unnamed U.S. agency had determined the case risked revealing government secrets." In March 2015, the U.S. Federal District dismissed the lawsuit, ruling that "the Justice Department made a compelling argument that the lawsuit cannot go forward without potentially exposing U.S. national security secrets." According to Greek press reports, various Greek criminal charges were filed against the Greek ship owner before and after the dismissal of the federal court lawsuit. Despite multiple speculative press reports, neither Wallace nor UANI have commented on the dismissal of the suit on the basis of the state secrets privilege beyond their counsel's statement welcoming the dismissal of the "meritless" lawsuit in its entirety.

=== Counter Extremism Project ===
Wallace is the chief executive officer of the Counter Extremism Project (CEP), launched in September 2014. CEP is a not-for-profit, non-partisan, international policy organization formed to combat the growing threat from extremist ideology. The organization is led by Wallace and a team of former world leaders and former diplomats, including Frances Townsend and Senator Joseph Lieberman. CEP aims to combat extremism by pressuring financial support networks, countering the narrative of extremists and their online recruitment, and advocating for strong laws, policies and regulation. The group produces research, having conducted a comprehensive survey on the public's attitudes and knowledge of extremism in order to ensure measurable results of its projects and campaigns. CEP also is building a clearinghouse and database of extremists groups and their supporters, mapping the social and financial networks, tools and methodologies.

Wallace, Townsend and the group have engaged in a "Digital Disruption" campaign. In an attempt to curb extremist online activity, ranging from incitement of violence to recruitment of youth, the group has petitioned Twitter to take down jihadist accounts.

In June 2016, CEP unveiled its "eGlyph" software tool for use by Internet and social media companies to "quickly find and eliminate extremist content used to spread and incite violence and attacks." CEP Senior Advisor Hany Farid, a Dartmouth College computer scientist, developed the software. eGLYPH functions similarly to PhotoDNA, a system that uses robust hashing technology that Farid worked on developing with Microsoft, which is "now widely used by Internet companies to stop the spread of content showing sexual exploitation or pornography involving children." This development was covered widely in the international press, including by The Washington Post, The Atlantic, Foreign Policy, Bloomberg, Reuters, and AFP.

To operationalize this new technology to combat extremism, CEP proposed the creation of a National Office for Reporting Extremism (NORex), which would house a comprehensive database of extremist content and function similar to the National Center for Missing & Exploited Children (NCMEC). The White House signaled its support for this initiative. Lisa Monaco, President Obama's top counterterrorism adviser, said, "We welcome the launch of initiatives such as the Counter Extremism Project's National Office for Reporting Extremism (NORex) that enables companies to address terrorist activity on their platforms and better respond to the threat posed by terrorists' activities online." Wallace stated that if this system were to be adopted by social media companies and the private sector, it "would go a long way to making sure that online extremism is no longer pervasive."

CEP has "called on YouTube and other platforms to permanently ban" the material of the al-Qaeda–affiliated preacher Anwar al-Awlaki, "including his early, mainstream lectures." According to CEP, 88 "extremists," 54 in the U.S. and 34 in Europe, have been influenced by Awlaki, including those who carried out the 2013 Boston Marathon bombing, the 2015 San Bernardino attack, and the 2016 Orlando nightclub shooting.

In 2017, the Islamic State of Iraq and the Levant (ISIS) released a "kill list" video which threatened Wallace and CEP with the message, "You messed with the Islamic State, SO EXPECT US SOON." In March 2019, the FBI arrested Kim Anh Vo in Georgia for her role in making the video.

=== Private sector work ===
Wallace was the chief executive officer of the Tigris Financial Group, a New York City–based investment, advisory and asset management firm that focuses on natural resources and the natural resources sector through its Electrum Group of Companies. He went on to be Chief Operating Officer of an affiliate of the Tigris Group Inc., The Electrum Group, LLC, a private investment firm founded in 2012. Electrum invests primarily in the natural resources sector with an emphasis on precious metals. In his capacity of CEO of Tigris, he headed the transaction team for Silver Opportunity Partners in its acquisition of Idaho's historic Sunshine Mine. Regarding that acquisition, Wallace told Bloomberg Businessweek, "It was no doubt a complicated and risky transaction. Through our expertise, we were able to minimize the risk involved, resolve litigation, and reunite the patchwork and fractured ownership interests that inhibited the mine and limited its value over the last decade." In 2011, Sunshine Silver Mines filed its S1 with the United States Securities and Exchange Commission, describing its intention to go public on the NYSE and TSX.

Wallace's work with Electrum has included leading its investment and operational entry into the Polish mineral sector through Śląsko Krakowska Kompania Górnictwa Metali Sp. z o.o. (SKKGM) and Amarante Investments S.p. z.o.o. (Amarante). In 2011, SKKGM commenced a drilling program at its Bolesławiec-Iłowa and Osiecznica-Nowiny concessions in Lower Silesia and at its concession near Myskow. Also in 2011, Amarante announced its application to the Polish government for nine concessions for mineral exploration in and near Wroclaw and Kobierzyce. In relation to their work in Poland, Wallace was quoted as saying that the Group's team hopes "to make discoveries of copper, tungsten and silver in Poland." In the same article, Wallace stated that gold, due to the uncertain business environment, has "practically become a currency again," and that the Group's belief that supply and demand fundamentals would continue to be the key economic driver for copper, silver and other metals.

Wallace has also attempted to secure the necessary regulatory approvals and community support for Electrum's efforts to explore its Paramount mine claims in eastern California's Bodie Wilderness Study Area. Wallace spoke for Electrum's Cougar Gold subsidiary at a February 2011 meeting in California. There, he explained that additional exploratory drilling in the area cannot occur until the Wilderness Study Area designation is removed. In an August 2011 Wall Street Journal article, Wallace described the Bodie dispute as "'the tip of the spear' in a growing national debate over balancing conservation and resource extraction." In the Los Angeles Times, he described the great potential of Paramount: "A lot of us are quite fond of the people there. This could be a real success story."

Also as part of his work with Electrum, Wallace is on the board of directors of Niocan Inc., a Canadian company whose Quebec mining assets focus on niobium and iron ore.

=== PaykanArtCar ===
Wallace is the chief executive officer and founder of PaykanArtCar, a non-profit organization and art project that advocates for human rights in Iran.

The organization owns a Paykan limousine gifted to Romanian president Nicolae Ceausescu by Mohammad Reza Pahlavi, the Shah of Iran, in 1974. In 2021, PaykanArtCar commissioned Iran-born artist Alireza Shojaian to paint over the Paykan as a symbol of human rights in Iran. Shojaian, a gay man then living in Paris, dedicated his work to LGBTQ rights in Iran and based his work on the Shahnameh, an Iranian epic poem.

The car was due to be exhibited at Asia Now in October 2021, but the invitation was later rescinded. Asia Now director Alexandra Fain said that although Asia Now endorsed LGBTQ rights, they could not exhibit the car because of "the organization supporting this project, which uses the L.G.B.T.Q.+ cause for priority reasons that are other than purely artistic, and which endanger the safety of the people working with us on our Iranian platform." Wallace disputed Fain's statement, calling it "defamatory" and stating that his support for regime change in Iran was not mutually exclusive with advocating for LGBTQ rights in Iran.

=== Turkish Democracy Project ===
Wallace is chief executive officer of the Turkish Democracy Project, a non-profit international policy organization. The Turkish Democracy Project has criticized Recep Tayyip Erdoğan and Wallace has disapproved of Turkey's inclusion in NATO while under Erdoğan.

== Personal life ==
Wallace married American political advisor, and later TV news show host Nicolle Wallace in 2005. The couple had a son in 2011. He and Nicolle divorced in 2019.
