= Counter Extremism Project =

Nonprofit NGO that combats extremist groups

- Formation: 22 September 2014
- Type: NGO
- Legal status: 501(c)(4) nonprofit organization
- Location: New York, Berlin, London
- CEO: Mark Wallace
- President: Frances Townsend
- Website: www.counterextremism.com

The Counter Extremism Project (CEP) is a non-profit non-governmental organization that combats extremist groups "by pressuring financial support networks, countering the narrative of extremists and their online recruitment, and advocating for strong laws, policies and regulations".

CEP was formally launched on 22 September 2014, by former senior government officials, including former Homeland Security adviser Frances Townsend, former Connecticut Senator Joseph Lieberman and Mark Wallace, a former U.S. Ambassador to the United Nations. Other senior members of CEP include Hans-Jakob Schindler and Ambassador Edmund Fitton-Brown, both of whom served as coordinators for U.N. Sanctions Monitoring teams.

The mission of the organization is to fight global extremism, with an initial goal of disrupting the financing and online recruitment and propaganda of the Islamic State of Iraq and the Levant (ISIS). The group is modeled on United Against Nuclear Iran, an advocacy group led by Wallace which has had success increasing economic pressure on the Islamic Republic of Iran. Other prominent board members include Gary Samore, August Hanning, Dennis Ross and Irwin Cotler.

CEP is a 501(c)(4) non-profit organization. It can accept tax-deductible contributions on a confidential basis. For security reasons, CEP generally declines to name its financial backers, except for Thomas Kaplan, a billionaire investor who also supports United Against Nuclear Iran.

== Digital Disruption Campaign ==
CEP launched its "Digital Disruption Campaign" to remove accounts associated with ISIS from social media networks in order to deny them popular platforms to incite violence, spread their ideas and recruit members. The campaign has particularly focused on Twitter, calling on the company to adopt new policies to prevent extremists such as ISIS from misusing their platform, as well as identifying ISIS accounts and alerting Twitter to remove them. ISIS has made extensive use of social media, especially Twitter, to recruit fighters and to distribute propaganda videos, including clips that show the decapitation of American journalists and a British foreign aid official. The campaign has led to death threats such as beheading against the CEP president Frances Townsend on Twitter from jihadist accounts.

CEP started by collecting ISIS propaganda to learn how it tailors its messaging to various audiences. CEP had this material translated into English to make it easier for academics, reporters and other researchers to study ISIS and its methods. CEP then crafted a counter-narrative that brought attention to human rights abuses under ISIS, its use of extreme violence against women, children and non-combatants.

=== YouTube study ===
A study released by CEP in July 2018, determined that while YouTube had made a great deal of progress towards removing extremist content, terrorists still had a large audience on the site. CEP determined that between March and June 2018 ISIS members and supporters uploaded 1,348 videos to the site which received 163,391 views over the same period. 24% of those videos remained on YouTube for at least two hours. Many of these videos were shared on Facebook, Twitter and other social media sites before YouTube could delete them. These videos were posted using 278 accounts. Roughly 60% of these accounts were allowed to remain active by YouTube despite having been used to upload extremist content that violated the site's terms of use. Hany Farid, a senior advisor to CEP, criticized YouTube. He said, "We know these videos are being created for propaganda purposes to incite and encourage violence, and I find those videos dangerous in a very real way."

CEP searched YouTube using 185 keywords commonly associated with ISIS. These included the Arabic terms for "crusader." "jihad". the names of ISIS-controlled geographic locations, media outlets and propagandists. CEP created a software system that searched YouTube every 20 minutes over the three-month life of the study. The system then used CEP's video identification tool, eGLYPH, to compare the results to 229 known terrorist video clips. eGLYPH generates a unique signature called a "hash" for each video or section of a video. This, in turn, allows known videos to be identified even if they have been edited, copied or otherwise altered.

=== Amicus brief ===
In December 2022, Farid submitted an amicus curiae brief in the case Gonzalez v. Google LLC, which dealt with the question of whether recommender systems are covered by liability exemptions in dealing with terrorism-related content hosted on their servers. In support of the petitioners, CEP argued that Google prioritised revenues on its platforms, including YouTube, knowingly allowing extreme content to be promoted by its algorithms as a result. The brief suggested that Google-generated recommendations are not “neutral tools” and should not be protected by Section 230.

== Global Youth Summit Against Violent Extremism ==
On 28 September 2015, CEP co-hosted the first Global Youth Summit Against Violent Extremism with the U.S. Department of State and Search for Common Ground at The Roosevelt Hotel in New York City. The event "drew more than 80 youth leaders from 45 countries with the objective of developing outreach and social-media intervention initiatives that can be shared globally". Senior U.S. government officials who addressed the attendees included the U.S. Homeland Security Advisor Lisa Monaco, the Under Secretary of State for Public Diplomacy and Public Affairs Richard Stengel, and the Under Secretary of State for Civilian Security, Democracy, and Human Rights Sarah Sewall. The summit also used presentations from Facebook and Microsoft. A panel of judges at the summit awarded $100,000 to youth activist programs it believed would have the greatest impact.

== NORex ==
In June 2016, CEP unveiled a software tool for use by Internet and social media companies to "quickly find and eliminate extremist content used to spread and incite violence and attacks". A CEP senior advisor. Hany Farid, a computer scientist who specializes in the forensic analysis of digital images, developed the software. It functions similarly to PhotoDNA, a system that uses robust hashing technology that Farid worked on developing with Microsoft, which is "now widely used by Internet companies to stop the spread of content showing sexual exploitation or pornography involving children".

To operate this new technology to combat extremism, CEP proposed the creation of a National Office for Reporting Extremism (NORex), which would house a comprehensive database of extremist content and function similar to the National Center for Missing & Exploited Children. President Obama supported this initiative. Lisa Monaco, Obama's top counterterrorism adviser, said, "We welcome the launch of initiatives such as the Counter Extremism Project's National Office for Reporting Extremism that enables companies to address terrorist activity on their platforms and better respond to the threat posed by terrorists' activities online." Wallace stated that if this system were to be adopted by social media companies and the private sector, it "would go a long way to making sure that online extremism is no longer pervasive".

== Government partnerships ==
CEP has developed partnerships with several international governmental entities to address the complex challenges posed by extremism. One such initiative is the "Alternative Pathways" rehabilitation and reintegration program, developed with the U.S. Department of Homeland Security to fill the gap in formal in-prison recidivism reduction and post-release support for individuals with extremism-related convictions in the United States. The project consists of a ten-week course, delivering a comprehensive counter-radicalization curriculum, administered both in prison settings and through mail correspondence nationwide.

CEP has also established the "Radicalization, Rehabilitation, Reintegration, and Recidivism Network” (4R Network) in collaboration with Parallel Networks and the U.S. Department of Homeland Security. This network aims to facilitate a whole-of-society approach to extremist offender reintegration and recidivism reduction in the United States. Through partnerships with various stakeholders, including law enforcement, mental health providers, and religious leaders, the 4R Network promotes discussions, shares knowledge, and fosters collaborations to address the needs of reintegrating extremism-related offenders.

In partnership with the U.S. Department of State, the "Returning Whole" program provides reintegration and rehabilitation efforts in Tajikistan and Kyrgyzstan. By strengthening the capacity of stakeholders to provide psychosocial support to families of foreign terrorist fighters, the project aims to promote long-term recovery and resilience while addressing root causes of radicalization. A similar State Department collaboration named "Salaama" is focused on the Maldives.

CEP's collaboration with the German Federal Foreign Office resulted in a series of virtual events in 2021 focusing on violent right-wing extremism and terrorism. This initiative aimed to produce concrete policy recommendations and establish a platform for multilateral discussions on disrupting extremist activities. A further partnership with the Federal Foreign Office analyzed the transnational connectivity of right-wing terrorism/violent right-wing extremism, culminating in the publication of the study, Violent Right-Wing Extremism and Terrorism – Transnational Connectivity, Definitions, Incidents, Structures and Countermeasures, in November 2020.

=== Countering terrorist financing ===
CEP was one of two think tanks included in the development of new global regulations for crowdfunding platforms by the intergovernmental Financial Action Task Force (FATF), an initiative of the G7 to develop policies to combat money laundering, and in particular terrorism financing. In the U.S., CEP coordinates and chairs the counter-financing working group of the Eradicate Hate Summit, bringing together U.S. research institutes and the financial industry to stems the flow of money to American extremists. The governments of Austria, Germany, and the UK have regularly commissioned CEP to map out extremist financial networks, and CEP experts have briefed the security authorities in the U.S., the UK, Germany, and Austria on its findings.

== Extremism database ==
CEP's website contains an extensive database of extremist individuals and groups, from the extreme right, left and Islamist spheres, which is regularly updated. The database contains long-form, analytical reports, as well as shorter analysis, blog pieces and commentaries. The research regularly appears in the media and is cited by governments and government organisations. In 2020, the U.S. Library of Congress elected to archive the CEP website in recognition of its status as an important online resource.

== Leaked emails ==
In 2017, GlobaLeaks obtained information allegedly originating from the email account of Yousef Al Otaiba, revealing a relationship between Otaiba, the UAE government, CEP and United Against Nuclear Iran. CEP and UANI are both led by Mark Wallace, who was employed as a senior adviser of The Electrum Group LLC by its chairman, Thomas Kaplan, the UANI's top donor. Kaplan also maintains business relations with the UAE.

The claimed leaks revealed that in January 2015, Frances Townsend wrote an email to Otaiba for arranging meeting with the UAE President, Mohamed bin Zayed Al Nahyan. Both CEP and UANI have also been accused of continuously running campaigns against the Emirati rivals like Iran and Qatar on the request of the UAE. CEP was also supported by The Harbour Group's managing director, Richard Mintz, who served as an adviser to the UAE government for 7 years. Based on the emails, it has also been claimed that CEP receives funding from foreign governments like the UAE and Saudi Arabia.

== See also ==
- Global Counterterrorism Forum
- Global Centre for Combating Extremist Ideology
