= August Hanning espionage case =

German criminal investigation

The August Hanning espionage case is a criminal investigation by Germany's Federal Public Prosecutor General concerning allegations against August Hanning former President of the German Federal Intelligent Service (Bundesnachrichtendienst, BND), from 1998 to 2005.

Hanning is accused of paying his former employee Manfred Dankesreiter to supply him with classified BND documents over the course of years. Hanning allegedly received around 2000 internal documents and used them in his work as a private intelligent consultant. The German prosecutors also suspect he used the information to write an analysis for an intelligence officer of a foreign power, as well as passing political information to other intelligence officers from a foreign power.

Hanning and his former chief of staff Manfred Dankesreiter were arrested on 6 October 2026, with Hanning and his lawyer denying the allegations.

== Background ==
Hanning was head of the German Federal Intelligence Service from December 1998 until November 2005, later serving as a state secretary in the Federal Ministry of the Interior until November 2009. He then worked as a security and business consultant. According to German prosecutors, Manfred Dankesreiter was Hanning's chief of staff at BND and of the latter BND president from 2012 until March 2026. The espionage investigation started while investigating another case. Since 2025, Hamburg prosecutors have been investigating Hanning involvement in the abduction of Christina Block's children from Denmark. The investigation concerned a failed attempt in 2022 and the abduction itself on New Year's Eve 2023-24. Hanning rejected these allegations and is not a defendant on the Hamburg trial. According to NDR, WDR and the Süddeutsche Zeitung, investigators found a USB flash drive in which there were numerous classified BND documents. The Federal Prosecutor General said the case is based on evidence found during the search, and Hamburg prosecutors passed their investigation to the federal prosecutor in May 2026.

== Allegations ==
According to the Federal Prosecutor General's statement, Hanning and Dankesreiter agreed in 2010 that Dankesreiter would continue to provide BND information to Hanning for payment. Prosecutors claim that over the years, up to 2022, Dankesreiter gave Hanning around 2000 documents, most of them classified used to brief senior officials. They believe that Hanning meant to use or trade the information using his work as a consultant. It is not yet clear what information has been used by Hanning. The two main suspicions that were brought to the public's attention are:

- Hanning used classified information to write an analysis for an officer for a foreign intelligence officer, it is yet unclear whether the officer received that analysis.
- Hanning is suspected of passing political information that came from Dankesreiter to another contact representing a foreign intelligence service.

The foreign services involved were not mentioned by the prosecutors, But NDR, WDR and Süddeutsche Zeitung claim the documents include analysis of the Iranian nuclear programme and the Russian military, as well as information from other intelligence services. Federal prosecutors suspect Hanning of treasonous espionage, spying out state secrets, attempted treason and working as a operative for another foreign intelligence service.

Dankesreiter is suspected of aiding and abetting attempted treason and treasonous espionage. According to Legal Tribune Online the crucial factor is whether the documents are containing state secrets under section 93 of the Criminal Code.

German news outlet Der Spiegel reported, that BND had apparently been aware for some time of the work Dankesreiter did for former BND President August Hanning. According to the Spiegel-report, BND issued official authorisation for this activity to Hanning's former chief of staff.

There have also been allegations that Hanning maintained longstanding contacts with former Chinese major general Wang Jianzheng. He allegedly shared confidential information with foreign intelligence agents after retiring in 2005 and becoming an independent security consultant.

== Arrests and proceedings ==
Officers of the Federal Criminal Police Office arrested Hanning at his home in Nordwalde, on the morning of 6 October 2026, while Manfred D. was arrested in Bavaria.

Israeli media highlighted that the way Hanning was caught involved Israeli operatives. The investigation that led to Hanning's exposure actually began with the investigation into the violent international kidnapping of millionaire heiress Christina Block’s children, in which the Israeli private spying firm CGI Group was implicated. Block used the Israelis to abduct her own children from her ex-husband and to plant bogus child sexual abuse images on his property in an attempt to frame him as a child abuser. Yaakov Peri, the former head of the Israeli domestic intelligence agency Shin Bet and current head of CGI Group in Tel Aviv, is not directly accused of espionage, but his prior business dealings with Hanning are the direct catalyst that triggered the entire espionage case. An alleged Israeli participant was extradited from Cyprus to Germany and brought to court. Two other suspects from Israel remain at large.

== Reactions ==
Marc Henrichmann, chair of the Bundestag' intelligence oversight committee, said that if proven, Hanning's conduct would be a breach of his duties, while Konstantin von Notz, a member of the Greens and the same committee, urged the government to find out what damage has been done to the intelligence service. BND's current president, Martin Jäger, stated the agency has begun an extensive internal investigation. According to The Guardian, prosecutors suspect this might be the most serious intelligence breach in Germany's national security history since the Cold War, and that Hanning is the most prominent man suspected of treason since Günter Guillaume in 1974. DW's political editor says this is Germany's biggest espionage scandal of the century.

As a consequence various politicians and intelligence experts demand stricter regulations for former intelligence agency employees. Politicians from the SPD and the Greens, as well as the non-profit Lobbycontrol, called for stricter legal regulations and longer cooling-off periods for former intelligence agency employees. Gerhard Schindler, also a former president of BND, expressed openness to such tighter rules.

== See also ==
- Guillaume affair
- Federal Intelligence Service
- Hans Tiedge
- Herman Simm
