= United Against Nuclear Iran =

American non-profit organization

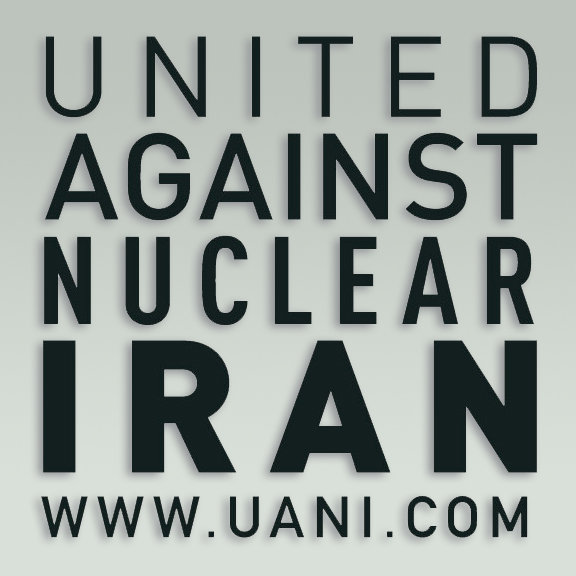
- Formation: 2008
- Type: 501(c)(3) organization
- Tax ID no.: 26-2387657
- CEO: Mark Wallace
- Chairman: Jeb Bush
- Founding co-chairs: Richard Holbrooke; Dennis Ross; James Woolsey
- Website: www.unitedagainstnucleariran.com

United Against Nuclear Iran (UANI) is a bipartisan, non-profit advocacy organization based in the United States. Its stated objective is to "prevent Iran from fulfilling its ambition to become a regional super-power possessing nuclear weapons." Along with other advocacy campaigns, the organization leads efforts to pressure companies to stop doing business with Iran as a means to halt the Iranian government's nuclear program and its alleged development of nuclear weapons.

== Leadership ==
Mark Wallace, who previously served as U.S. ambassador to the United Nations for UN Management and Reform, is founding CEO. Governor Jeb Bush has been chairman since August 2024.

Former Democratic United States Senator from Connecticut Joe Lieberman served as the organization's chairman from 2015 until his death in 2024.

Ambassadors Richard Holbrooke and Dennis Ross were original co-founders and co-chairman, alongside former CIA director James Woolsey, before being appointed to positions in the Obama administration. Ross has since rejoined the advisory board.

Other members of the board, as of September 2024, include Alireza Akhondi, Senator Mark Kirk, Tamir Pardo, John Bolton, Frances Townsend, Sir Ivor Roberts, Lord Charles Guthrie, Sir Graeme Lamb, Olli Heinonen, Ray Takeyh, The Baroness Pauline Neville-Jones, Irwin Cotler, Giulio Terzi di Sant'Agata, Dr. Graham Allison, Walter Russell Mead, Robert Hill, Cresencio S. Arcos, Jr., Roger Noriega, Otto Reich, Mark Salter, Stanley Kalms, Baron Kalms, and Matthias Küntzel. August Hanning, former president of the Federal Intelligence Service (BND) of Germany, is also on the advisory board.

== History ==
=== 2008–09 ===
UANI was founded in 2008 following a chance encounter between James Woolsey and Richard Holbrooke on a train. It hoped to replicate the Save Darfur Coalition which brought together a wide cross section of society to raise awareness about Iran's nuclear ambitions. Mark Wallace was founding CEO with Holbrooke, along with CIA Director James Woolsey and Ambassadors Dennis Ross serving as founding co chairs. At the start of the Obama administration in 2009, Holbrooke and Ross — along with another advisory board member, Gary Samore — left UANI to take positions at the White House.

In the run-up to the September 2009 United Nations General Assembly (UNGA), UANI called on New York City hotels and venues to refuse to host Iranian President Mahmoud Ahmadinejad. In its boycott campaign, UANI succeeded in having the Helmsley Hotel cancel his reservation. Two other New York hotels, Gotham Hall and the Dubai-owned Essex House, followed suit.

=== 2010–19 ===
In May 2012, UANI formed a transatlantic partnership to prevent a nuclear-armed Iran with the Institute for Strategic Dialogue, a London-based think tank. In 2013, Gary Samore returned to UANI as its president following service in the Biden administration, and would remain in the role for 2 years. John Bolton served on the UANI's advisory board until 2018 before leaving to join the Trump administration. In 2019 he returned to the organization as a senior advisor.

In June 2013, UANI launched its Maritime Intelligence Network and Rogue Vessel Analysis (MINERVA) system. According to the New York Times, it uses "publicly available satellite transmissions from ship transponders, including data on speed, identity, direction and destination, and correlated the information with other navigational data and computer algorithms" to track Iranian vessels potentially violating sanctions. The system then creates "vessel behavior profiles that could identify questionable activities even if the transponders were temporarily turned off." According to UANI, "the system had exposed possible sanctions violations that the group had then publicized, forcing the Iranians or their partners to change plans."

Also in 2013, Alireza Miryousefi, a spokesman for Iran's permanent mission to the UN, said the Iranian government considers the activities of UANI "counterproductive and contrary to the policy announced by the new administration in early 2009, which purportedly sought to diplomatically interact with Iran." In 2013, a pair of trusts associated with Thomas Kaplan and Sheldon and Miriam Adelson's family foundation accounted for more than three-quarters of the group's total revenue of $1.7 million for the 2013 tax year.

In September 2014, the United States Department of Justice intervened in a private lawsuit filed against UANI and requested its dismissal on the ground that the continued litigation of the case would jeopardize US national security. The case was in response to a lawsuit brought by Greek shipping magnate Victor Restis against UANI in July 2013. In response, the United States Government filed a motion asserting its right to intervene in the proceedings and requesting that Restis' complaint be dismissed because "continued litigation would risk disclosure" of sensitive matters pertaining to national security. The government's motion for dismissal was granted by Judge Edgardo Ramos on March 23, 2015, a rare case of state secrets privilege being applied in private civil litigation in which the government was not a party. Four prior cases were cited where a US court dismissed lawsuits on state secrets grounds without direct government involvement, but this was the first time neither the government nor a defense contractors were involved.

In August 2015, Senator Joe Lieberman became chairman of UANI, serving until his death in March 2024. In September 2016, Governor Jeb Bush, a Republican, joined the organization's advisory board alongside Governor Bill Richardson, a Democrat who served as Ambassador of the United States to the United Nations under President Bill Clinton.

On September 24, 2019, the Islamic Republic stated it would include UANI in its list of terrorist organizations. This came following UANI playing a key role in the United States decision to list the IRGC as terrorists and before a UANI summit featuring then-Secretary of State Mike Pompeo.

=== 2020–present ===
During the COVID-19 pandemic in Iran, UANI used name and shame tactics against nine pharmaceutical, biotechnology, and medical-device corporations to "end their Iran business." While the companies were exempt from sanctions for humanitarian reasons, the effort "sought to impose reputational costs on companies that engage in lawful and legitimate trade with Iran, including humanitarian trade" according to Tyler Cullis, a legal fellow at the National Iranian American Council.

In June 2022, UANI identified the VHF Transceiver Two-Way Radio manufactured by Icom Incorporated as being used by Hezbollah, a U.S. designated Foreign Terrorist Organization. It sent a letter to Icom outlining its concerns about the dual-use capability of the radios and regarding Icom’s business ties to Power Group (Icom’s representatives in Lebanon) and Faza Gostrar, which claims to be the “Official ICOM representative in Iran.”

In 2022, ATEN International stopped accepting orders from Iran following concerns raised by UANI. In August 2024, UANI announced that former Florida Governor Jeb Bush would succeed Lieberman as the organization's chairman.

== Corporate campaigns ==
UANI runs the Iran Business Registry (IBR), "a running database of reputable media and academic reports of international corporations doing business in Iran." UANI encourages citizens to use the IBR to increase product awareness, divest, contact businesses as well as elected officials. It also calls on companies to sign a declaration to certify their company does not do business with Iran. The registry was launched in 2009 and more than 500 companies are listed on UANI's IBR page.

=== General Electric ===
In September 2009, General Electric (GE) signed UANI's "Iran Business Declaration" to not conduct business with Iran. As part of its pledge, GE will donate profits to charitable organizations from the sale of any humanitarian health care products to Iran.

=== Huntsman ===
In January 2010, the American chemical company Huntsman said it would discontinue sales in Iran after coming under pressure from United Against Nuclear Iran. UANI reported that one of Huntsman's subsidiaries was selling polyurethanes in Iran, a dual-use material which UANI said could be used in the development of solid rocket fuel. In a statement, Huntsman said, "The small amount of business done there does not justify the reputational risk currently associated with doing business with entities located in Iran due to growing international concern over the policies of the current regime."

=== Caterpillar ===
In response to a UANI pressure campaign, the heavy-equipment manufacturer Caterpillar ceased its business in Iran through its non-U.S. subsidiaries. As part of the campaign, UANI erected a roadside billboard near the company's headquarters in Peoria, Illinois which pictured a Caterpillar digger alongside a picture of Mahmoud Ahmadinejad with the slogan "Today's work, Tomorrow's Nuclear Iran."

UANI sought to link the activities of Caterpillar's wholly owned Canadian subsidiary Lovat, a manufacturer of tunnel boring machines, to Iran's alleged construction of tunnels to obscure and shield its nuclear facilities. Additionally, the Iranian company Arya Machinery, which marketed itself on its website as Iran's exclusive dealer of Caterpillar machinery, had been purchasing Caterpillar equipment from a Caterpillar subsidiary in Europe.

=== Ingersoll Rand ===
In March 2010, UANI also succeeded in pressuring the U.S. manufacturing corporation Ingersoll Rand to stop doing business in Iran. In a letter to United Against Nuclear Iran, Ingersoll Rand CEO Michael Lamach said that effective immediately, the company would order its foreign subsidiaries to cease any dealings with Iran "in light of very real and escalating concerns about the intentions of the current regime in Iran." At issue was the use of Ingersoll Rand air compressors used in industrial plants run by the state-owned National Iranian Oil Company.

=== Cranes Campaign ===
In response to the Iranian government's "execution binge" in 2011, UANI launched its "Cranes Campaign" in March 2011 with the goal of pressuring crane manufacturers worldwide to end their business in Iran in order to prevent the use of their equipment in public executions. Through its campaign, UANI has succeeded in pressuring Terex (U.S.), Tadano (Japan), Liebherr, UNIC (Japan), and Konecranes (Finland) to end their business in Iran. Tadano and UNIC, both of Japan, ended their Iran sales after UANI presented graphic photographic evidence of their cranes being used in public executions in the country.

== Legislation ==
In October 2009 Ron Klein (D) and John Mica (R) of Florida introduced the United States House of Representatives Accountability for Business Choices in Iran Act (ABC Iran Act) which would preclude companies that conduct business in Iran from receiving U.S. government contracts. The legislation was created to prevent Iranian business partners like Nokia and Siemens from receiving large government contracts as well as foreign banks like Credit Suisse from receiving federal bailout money. Representative Klein stated, "We need to send a strong message to corporations that we’re not going to continue to allow them to economically enable the Iranian government to continue to do what they have been doing." Klein credited UANI for assisting with drafting the bill. The act fell at the end of the 2009 Congressional session.

== See also ==
- Iran and weapons of mass destruction
- U.S. sanctions against Iran
- Citizens for a Nuclear Free Iran
- Axis of Unity
