= Ostendorff =

Ostendorff is a German surname. Notable people with the surname include:

- Friedrich Ostendorff (born 1953), German politician
- Werner Ostendorff (1903–1945), German SS-general during World War II
