= Aten (disambiguation) =

Aten is the disk of the sun in ancient Egyptian mythology.

Aten may also refer to:

- Aten (city), an ancient city found near Luxor, Egypt
- Aten, Nebraska, a community in Cedar County
- Aten asteroids, a group of near-Earth asteroids
- Aten religion or Atenism, associated with the ancient Egyptian pharaoh Akhenaten
- ATEN International, a Taiwanese technology company
- Aten language, spoken in Nigeria
- Atén River, a river of Bolivia
- 2062 Aten, an asteroid and namesake of an asteroid group
- ATen, the tensor library of PyTorch

== People named Aten ==
- Erhart Aten (1932–2004), Micronesian politician
- Ira Aten (1862–1953), Texas Ranger
- Jan Willem Aten, (born 1953), Brazilian yachtsman
- Murl K. Aten (1901–1971), American politician
