= Karl Schiewerling =

German politician (1951–2021)

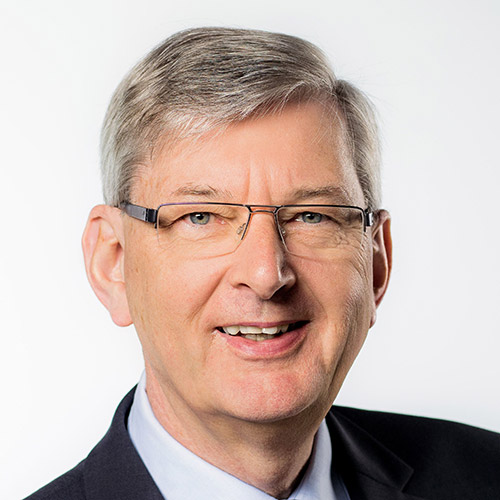
Karl Schiewerling

Karl Schiewerling (Borbeck-Mitte, Essen, North Rhine-Westphalia, West Germany, 18 May 1951 – Nottuln, North Rhine-Westphalia, Germany, 28 February 2021) was a German politician.

== Career ==
Schiewerling was a member of the municipal council of his place of residence, Nottuln, from 1989 to 1994 and from 2004 to 2006.

He was a member of the German Bundestag from 2005 to 2017.

Karl Schiewerling entered the Bundestag as a directly elected Member of Parliament for the constituency of Coesfeld – Steinfurt II, succeeding the CDU Member of Parliament Werner Lensing. In the 2005 Bundestag election, he achieved 51.6% of the first votes here. In the 2009 Bundestag election, he was confirmed in office with 50.8% of the first votes. From November 2009, he was chairman of the "Labour and Social Affairs" working group of the CDU/CSU parliamentary group and its labour market and social policy spokesman. He was also chairman of the Kardinal-Höffner-Kreis, an association of Christian MPs in the CDU/CSU parliamentary group.
