= Marc Henrichmann =

German politician

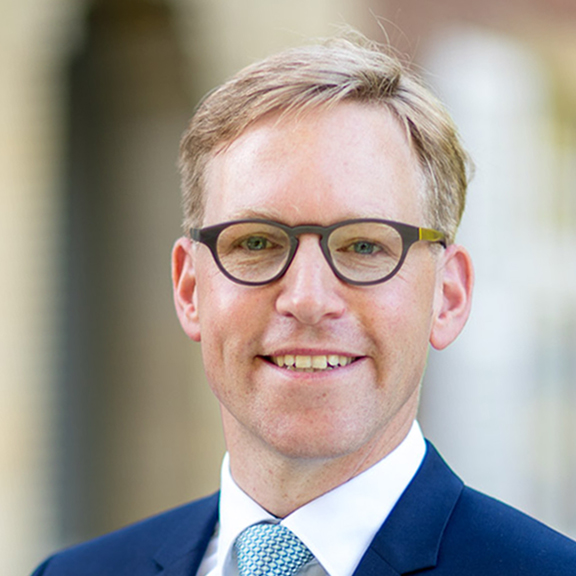
- Marc Henrichmann in 2017

Member of the Bundestag
- Incumbent
- Assumed office 2017

Personal details
- Born: 1 June 1976 (age 50) Münster, West Germany (now Germany)
- Party: CDU
- Education: University of Münster

Marc Henrichmann (born 1 June 1976) is a German lawyer and politician of the Christian Democratic Union (CDU) who has been serving as a member of the Bundestag from the state of North Rhine-Westphalia since 2017. He serves the Coesfeld – Steinfurt II constituency.

Henrichmann is chairmen of the Parliamentary Oversight Panel to controll the intelligent agencys.

== Political career ==
Henrichmann studien law in Münster and worked as lawyer in Havixbeck. Than he was CEO of a lobby foundation of DJV ("natur + mensch") from 2014 to 2017.

Henrichmann became a member of the Bundestag in the 2017 German federal election. He is a member of the Committee on Petitions and the Committee on Home Affairs. In this capacity, he serves as his parliamentary group's rapporteur on gun control.

He is married an has one child.

== Other activities ==
- Foundation for Data Protection, Member of the Advisory Board (since 2022)
- Federal Agency for Civic Education (BPB), Alternate Member of the Board of Trustees (since 2018)
- German Red Cross (DRK), Member
