= Global Center to Combat Extremism =

Saudi Arabian non-profit

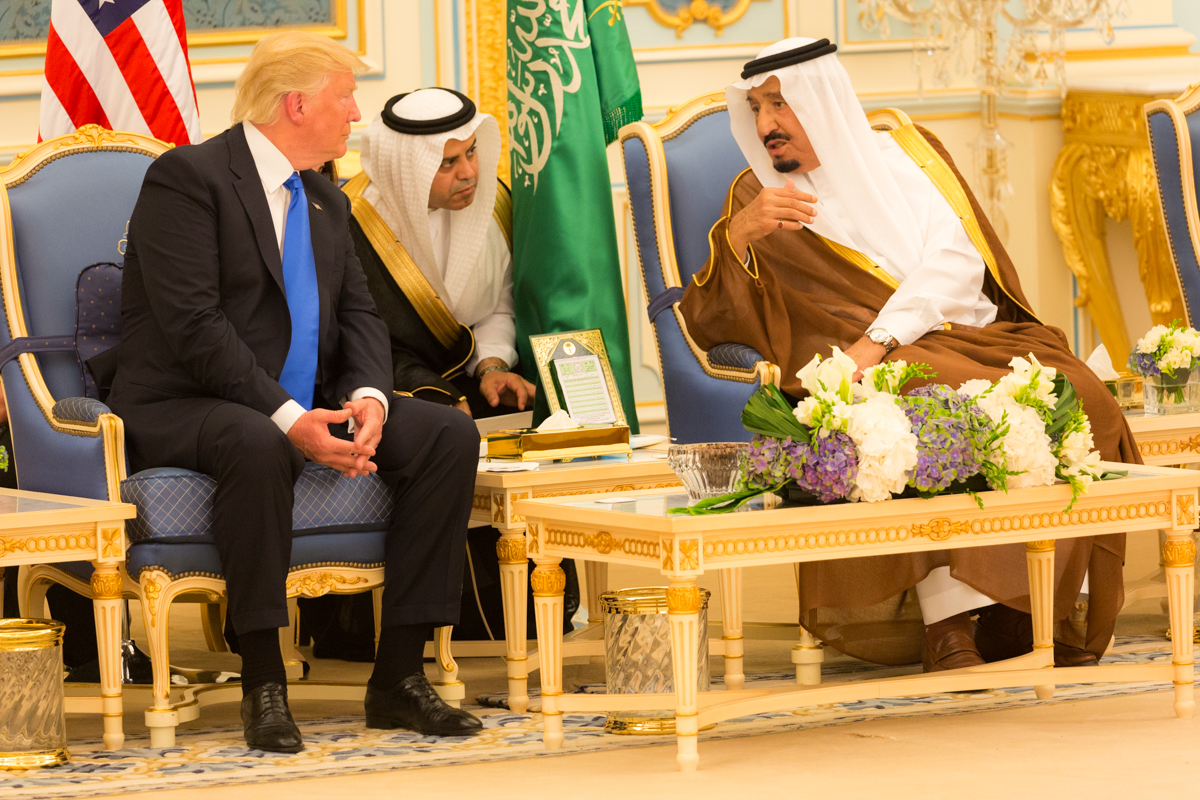
President Trump and King Salman talk during summit proceedings at the Al Yamamah Palace in Riyadh on 20 May 2017.

The Global Center for Combating Extremist Ideology, also known as "Etidal", is a non-profit organization in Riyadh, established for the stated purpose of combating extremism.

== History ==
The organization was founded in 2017 after a meeting between Saudi King Malik Salman bin Abdulaziz Al Saud and US President Donald Trump during the 2017 Riyadh summit.

Since February 2022 it has been removing terrorist content from Telegram.

== Description ==
The organization is governed by a 12-member Board of Directors, consisting of various international organizations and state institutions, that are appointed for a 5-year term.

The use of technology is one of the claimed methods of the center to combat extremism.

The stated purposes of the center are:

- to actively and proactively combat, expose, and refute extremist ideology, in cooperation with governments and organizations concerned.
- Combating national, media, and statistical extremism and support peace and tolerance between nations.
- Strengthen Islamic moderation principles in the world.
- Observe and analyze extremist groups' ideological activities, supporting, informing, and engaging in confronting extremist ideas.
