= Aton LLC =

Investment company in Russia

ATON
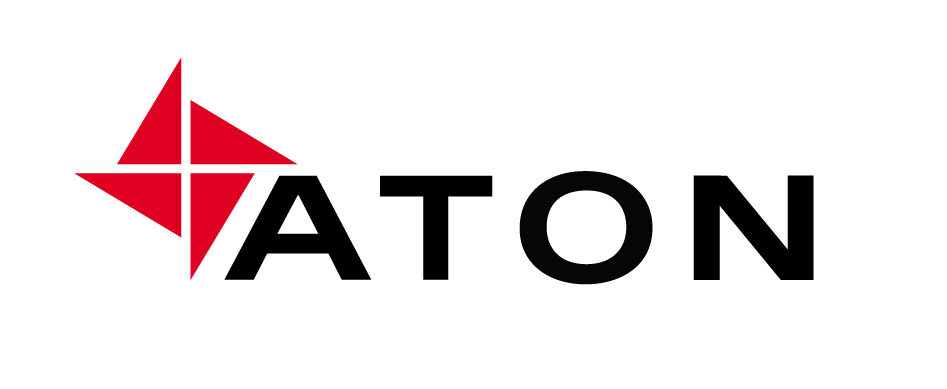
- Company type: Private
- Industry: Finance
- Founded: 1991
- Headquarters: Moscow, Russia
- Products: Brokerage, Investment services, Asset Management, Institutional Brokerage
- Website: www.aton.ru

ATON LLC is one of the oldest investment companies in Russia. It was founded in 1991, sold to UniCredit group in 2007 and recreated in 2009. ATON operates in 30 Russian cities. ATON’s headquarter is in Moscow.

== History ==
In 2013, ATON took part in IPO of the Moscow Stock Exchange as a co-manager and as well as in the SPO of QIWI – the first SPO of foreign equities on MICEX.

From 2018 to 2020, ATON offered its clients to participate in a number of unique Private Equity projects. In 2019, ATON launched fund "Aton Alternative Strategies", which allows private investors to invest in hedge funds. Also in 2019, ATON launched ATON Trading platform that provides direct access trading for a broad range of financial products on the global markets. In 2020, ATON became a partner of Bank Saint Petersburg's Private Banking division. Also in 2020, ATON became the largest market maker of exchange-traded funds in the Russian market.

In 2022, Moody's downgraded the credit rating of ATON to Ca.

In 2022, Fitch Ratings assigned a credit rating B "Negative" to ATON.

== Sources ==
- ATON History
- ATON Capital (previously ATON Capital Partners)
