= Block House (restaurant) =

Restaurant chain based in Hamburg, Germany

- Type: Aktiengesellschaft
- Industry: Restaurant chain
- Founded: September 26, 1968; 58 years ago
- Founder: Eugen Block
- Headquarters: Hamburg, Germany
- Area served: Germany, Portugal, Spain, Austria
- Key people: Eugen Block; Stephan von Bülow; Martin Heuer
- Number of employees: 2,600
- Parent: Eugen Block Holding GmbH
- Website: www.block-house.de

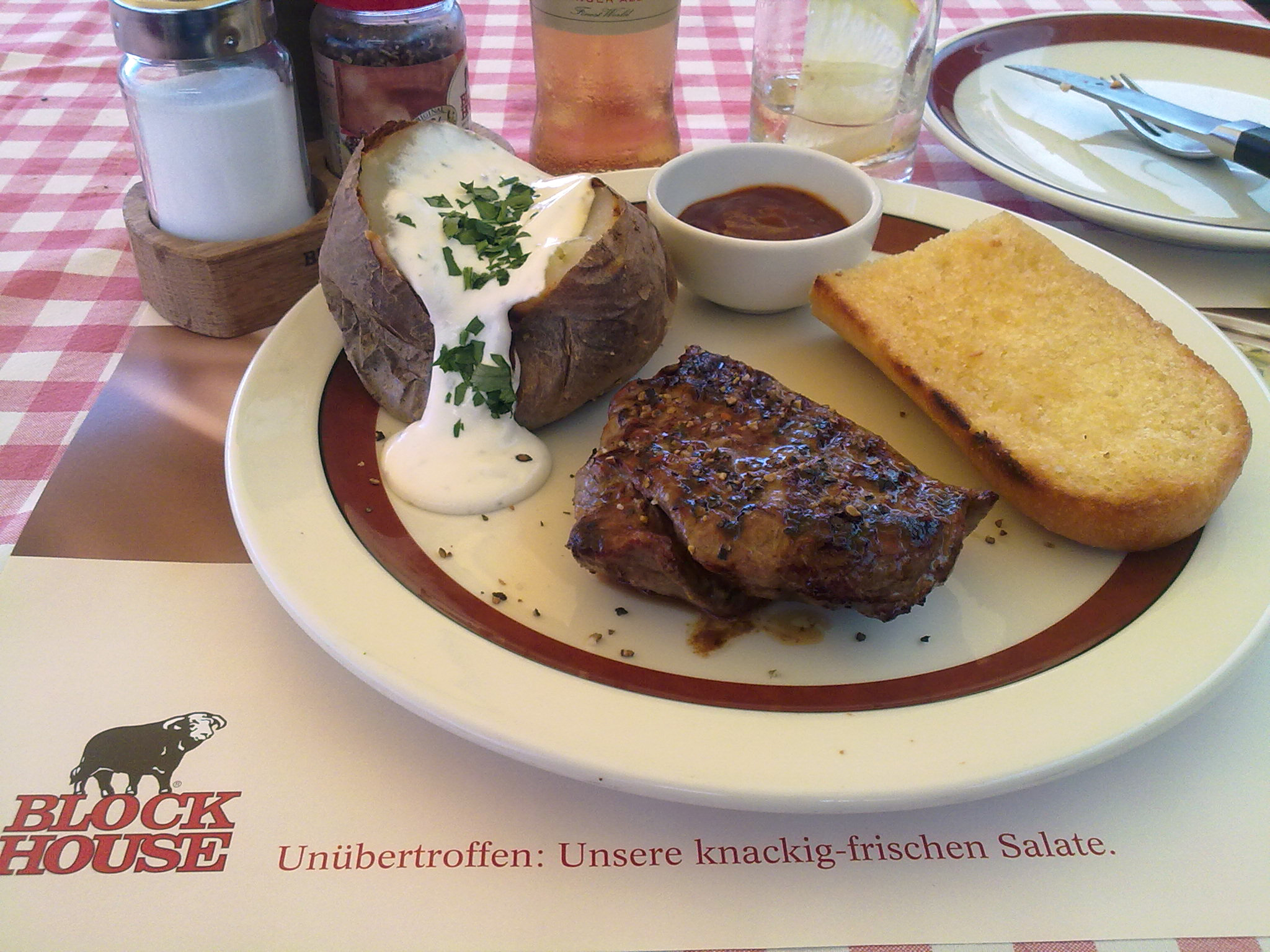
A Block House steak in Portugal

Block House AG is a restaurant chain based in Hamburg, Germany. Block House restaurants specialize in steaks.

The chain was founded in 1968 by Eugen Block and his sister Marlies Head. It owns 53 restaurants in Europe, 42 of which are in Germany, with the others being owned by Franchise partners in Portugal, Spain and Austria. The chain is part of the Block Gruppe (Eugen Block Holding GmbH), which has a total of 2,600 employees.

== History ==
The first restaurant opened on September 28, 1968, on Dorotheenstraße in Hamburg-Winterhude. In 1973 Block founded his own butcher's shop. In 1985 Block established the 5 star hotel Elysée in Hamburg-Rotherbaum, which was renovated and enlarged in 2006 and operates today under the name Grand Elysée.

The first restaurant outside Germany was opened in Malaga in 1996.

Eugen Block's daughter, Christina Block, is the heir to the steakhouse chain. She serves on its management team.

== Jim Block ==
In 1973 the brand Jim Block was created to utilize the meat offcuts from Block's steak production. The main product of Jim Block is hamburgers. Block owns 12 Jim Block restaurants in Hamburg, Berlin and Hannover.
