= Aton Edwards =

American sustainability expert

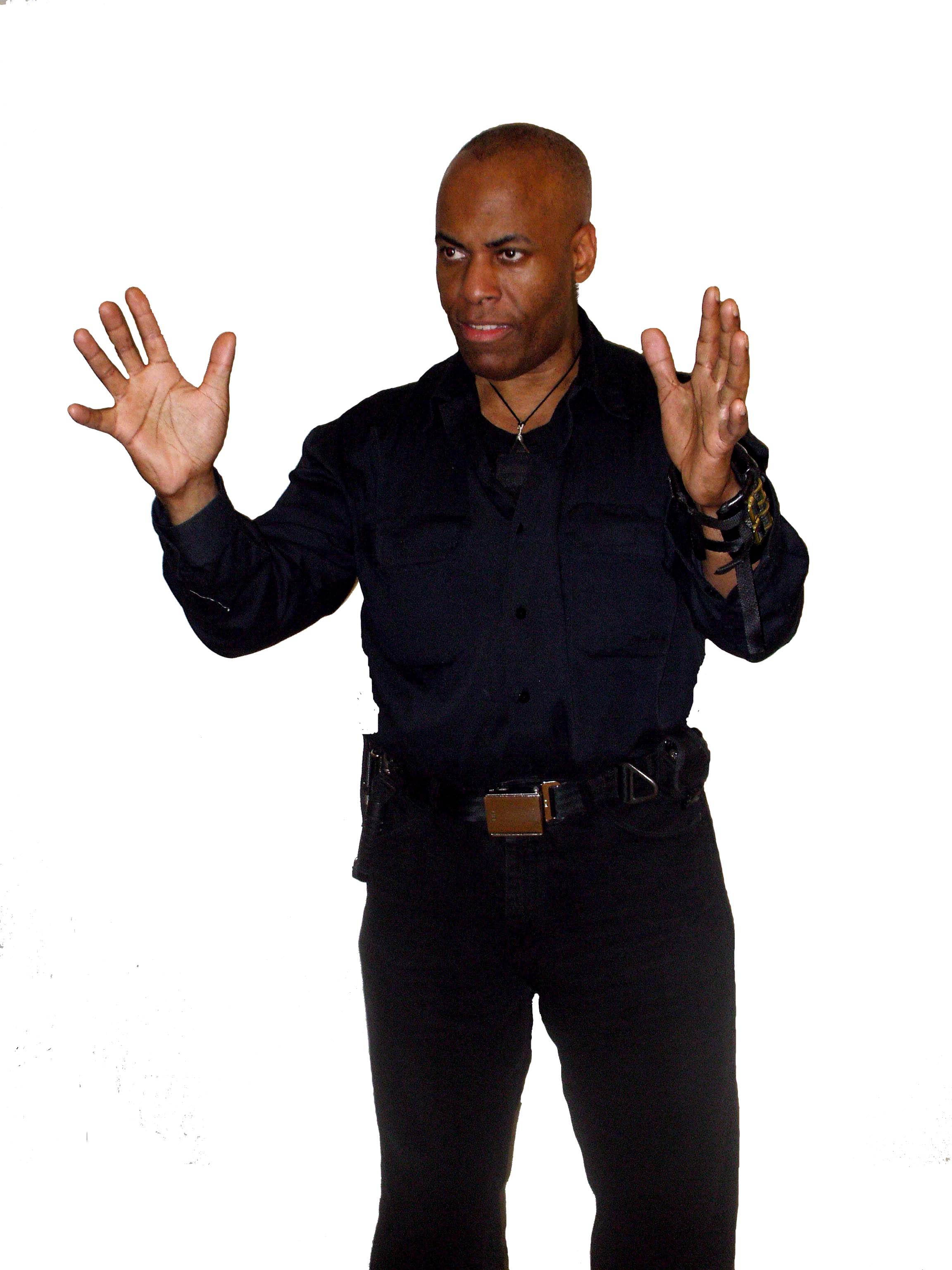
Aton Edwards

Aton Edwards (b. c. 1962) is an American expert in the fields of emergency preparedness, self-reliance and sustainable living. He is also an author, inventor, and environmental/social activist. He founded the International Preparedness Network (I.P.N.) in 1989 and serves as executive director.

== Early life and education ==
Edwards was born in New York about 1962 and grew up in the Bronx, attending public schools. He credits seeing the movie Deliverance (1972) at the age of 10 with inspiring his interest in survivor's skills.

== Entertainment career ==
When he was in his 20s, in the mid- to late 1980s, Edwards worked as a political stand-up comedian called "Badd Guy." He performed on Showtime. In the 1985 re-opening of the Apollo Theater in Harlem, Edwards was selected by Ralph Cooper Sr. as the first house comic; he had won the amateur night competition during NBC's special "Motown's 50th anniversary salute to the Apollo theater", starring Bill Cosby.

== Career ==
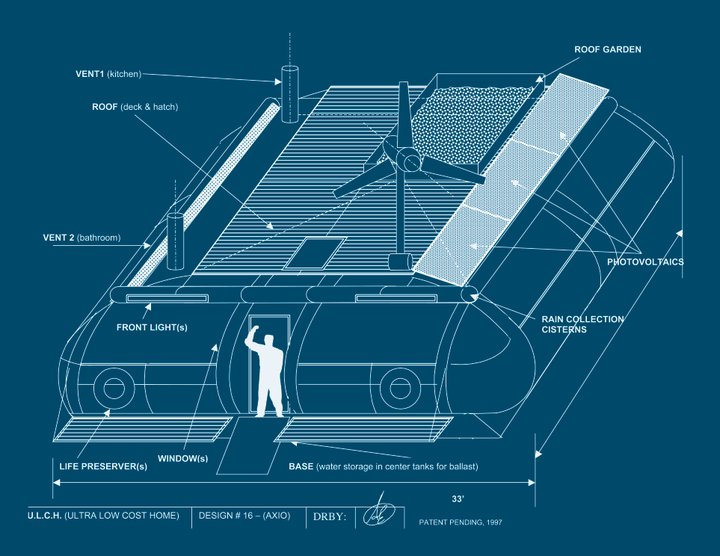
Early Ikhayatat design

Gradually Edwards became more interested in issues of disaster preparedness and how to train for self-reliance. In 1989 he and several friends founded what they later called the International Preparedness Network (IPN). In the early 21st century, it has become a training group to teach civilians how to prepare for, respond to and recover from natural, technological, environmental, civil, cyber, economic disasters. It specializes in the development of survival strategies for catastrophic emergencies such as global geophysical events, pandemics and nuclear, biological or chemical warfare. In 1993, they adopted the current name.

Edwards has created a preparedness/response/self-reliance system called "ia" (pronounced Eye-Aay), short for Improvisational Adaptation. "ia" combines the full range of activities related to preparedness, outdoor survival, sustainable living, personal health, and self-defense into a discipline similar to a martial art.

By the turn of the 21st century, Edwards began to use his stand-up comedy to highlight his views about preparedness. In 2002 he appeared on The Greg Giraldo Show on Comedy Central. In 2007, he appeared in a Current TV short called "Aton's Top Ten".

He was increasingly consulted for TV programs about preparedness. In 2009, he appeared in the National Geographic special, 6-Degrees. In 2010, Edwards hosted the Discovery Channel documentary special Track Me If You Can. In 2011 he was interviewed by Fox News. He has also been featured on MSNBC news and the Today Show as a contributor on disaster preparedness, self-reliance & security.

On September 18, 2011, Edwards was featured in the Discovery Channel special, How Will The World End, starring Samuel L. Jackson.

== Personal life ==
Edwards was once married to actress/comedian Kim Coles. He later entered into a common-law marriage with Ginger Davis.

== See also ==
- Emergency management
- Earthquake preparedness
