= Anne-Monika Spallek =

German politician (born 1968)

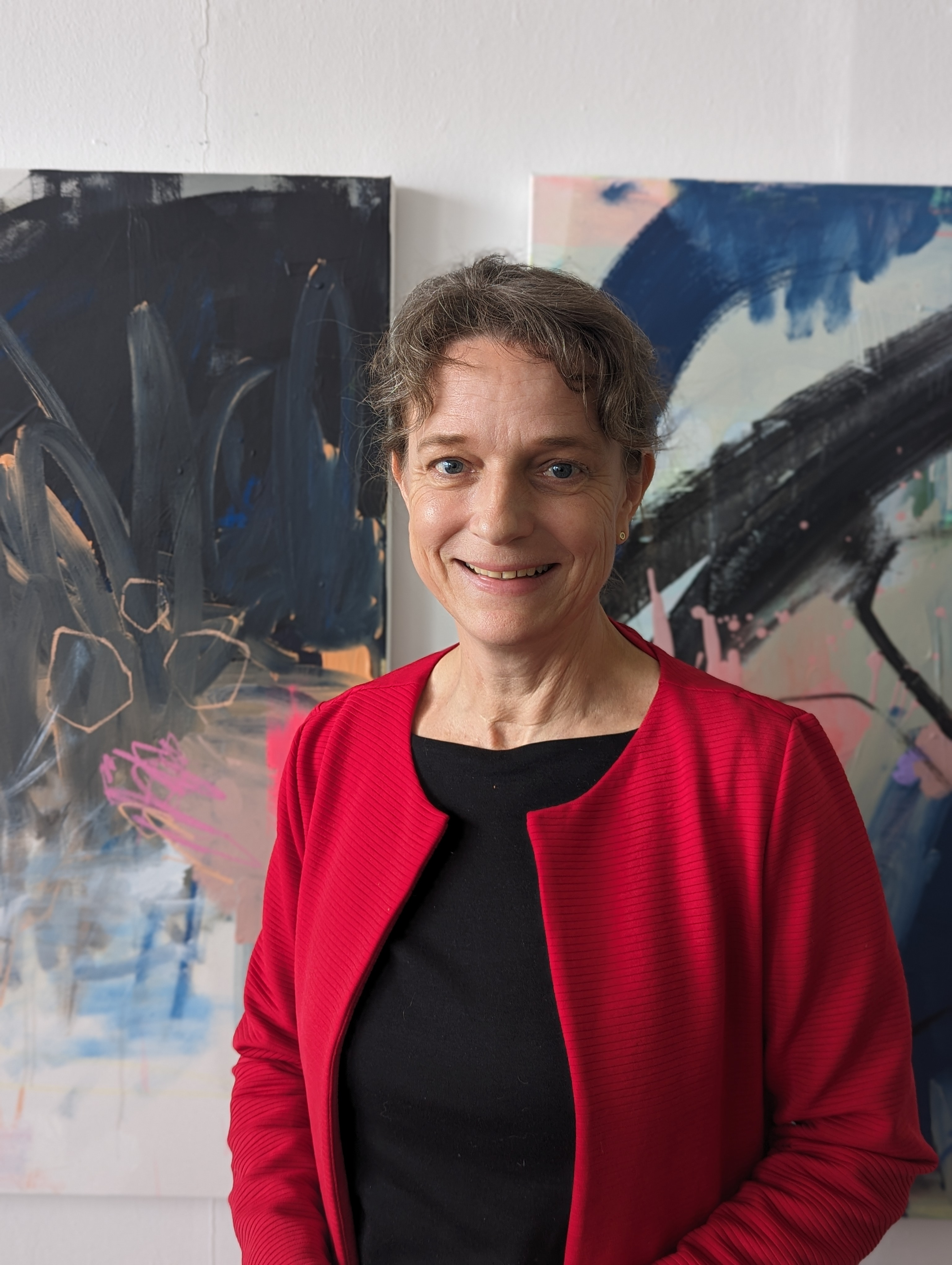
Image of Spallek

Anne-Monika Spallek (born 16 January 1968 in Nottuln) is a German politician for the Alliance 90/The Greens and a Bundestag member since 2021.
