= Kim Anh Vo =

American hacker

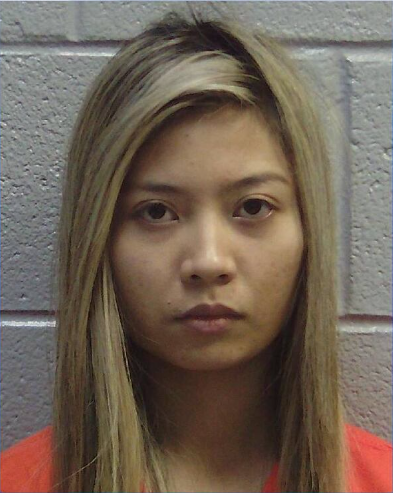
- Mug shot of Kim Anh Vo
- Born: 1998–1999; Georgia, U.S.
- Known for: Hacking for the Islamic State
- Criminal charges: Providing material support for terrorism
- Criminal status: House arrest

Kim Anh Vo (born 1998 or 1999) is an American hacker who did and assisted operations for the Islamic State Hacking Division throughout 2016 and 2018. She was associated with the sector called Kalachnikv E-Security Team where she also helped recruit others to join the group.

== Life ==
Vo was born on 1998 or 1999 in Georgia, United States, where she lived and attended school in Hephzibah, with her high school being 20 minutes south west of Augusta. She loved using computers and showed interest in programming, she would spend most of her time after school using her computer. She also showed interest in working in information technology for the Federal Bureau of Investigation.

=== Hacking and propaganda ===
During her time with the computer, she joined the United Cyber Caliphate, also known as the Islamic State Hacking Division in April 2016 and helped assist with operations to release confidential and private information about people, including soldiers of the United States Armed Forces, in data dumps called kill lists. She also spread Islamic State propaganda and memes in support of the Islamic State. She went by the aliases of F@ng, Zozo, Miss. Bones, and Kitty Lee. She recruited a 14-year-old Norwegian boy to join the division in which he then called for attacks against people in New York. She and the boy, making a video, threatened a nonprofit organization that sought to battle what it called extremist ideologies, including the ideologies of the Islamic State. She also spread propaganda telling others to kill people in New York and Brooklyn as well, with a list of 8,700 U.S. citizens' information being released as another "kill list", she made chats in Islamic State chatrooms about the situation and made social media posts stating "We want them #Dead".

=== Arrest ===
On March 12, 2019, Vo was arrested in her home after being officially indicted on charges of providing material support to a foreign terrorist organization as a violation of the Patriot Act by a New York federal judge. She was kept as a prisoner in the South District of New York. In April 2020, Vo was granted bail which was set at $25,000 and was signed by her mother and a family friend which will let her be released on house arrest in Evans, Georgia, with monitoring of her electronics and strict supervision with mental health and therapy sessions via telemedicine with her only being allowed to travel to the south New York and Georgia federal judicial districts and all points in between necessary for travel between the districts.
