= ATEN International =

Taiwan-based electronics and hardware manufacturer

ATEN International Co., Ltd.
- Native name: 宏正自動科技股份有限公司
- Type: Public company
- Traded as: TWSE: 6277
- Industry: Technology
- Founded: 1979; 47 years ago
- Founder: Shang-Chung Chen
- Headquarters: Xizhi, New Taipei, Taiwan
- Area served: Worldwide
- Key people: Shang-Chung Chen (Chairman/President); Shang-Jen Chen (Vice chairman)
- Products: KVM Switches, Remote Management Solutions, Video Products, USB Peripherals, Data Communication
- Revenue: ▲NT$ 4,898 million (2014)
- Operating income: ▲NT$ 2,878 million
- Net income: ▲NT$ 1,053 million (2014)
- Total assets: ▲NT$ 5.699 billion (2014)
- Total equity: ▲NT$ 3.553 billion (2014)
- Number of employees: 1631 (2014)
- Subsidiaries: U.S.A; Belgium; Japan; U.K. Korea; China; Australia; Taiwan; Russia; Poland
- Website: www.aten.com

Aten CS-1732A Master View KVMP switch USB/PS2 with audio

ATEN International Co.(Ltd) (Chinese: 宏正自動科技; pinyin: Hóngzhèng Zìdòng Kējì) is a multinational manufacturer of connectivity and access management hardware headquartered in Xizhi District, New Taipei, Taiwan. Its products include KVM switches, audiovisual switches and matrices, intelligent power distribution units, information technology management systems, and interface adapters. ATEN has subsidiaries in several countries and is the parent company of IOGEAR.

== History ==
The manufacturer was first founded in 1979, and their first products became available in 1981.

In 1999, the company became a public company and established IOGEAR, a subsidiary with which focuses on consumer electronics and information technology which is US-based.

In 2000, the company developed the first 4-port USB 2.0 hub, which became a USB testing standard for the USB Implementers Forum, Inc.

The company went public in 2003 and has since remained the only listed KVM manufacturer in the world.

In 2010, ATEN began offering professional-grade audio-visual (VanCryst) and green energy (NRGence) products, respectively.

In 2012, ATEN collaborated with the National Taiwan University of Science and Technology to develop "iListen", software aimed at helping the hearing-impaired. The following year, ATEN joined the HDBaseT Alliance and began developing video extenders and matrices featuring HDBaseT technology.

== Operations ==
ATEN has subsidiaries in the United States (established in 1996), Belgium (2000), Japan (2004), the United Kingdom (2006), South Korea (2007), China (2007), and Australia (2015). A representative office in Russia (2013); factories in Taiwan and China (2008); and R&D centers in Taiwan, China, and Canada (1998).

== Products ==
ATEN products use proprietary Application-specific integrated circuit (ASIC) technology, incorporating over 220 patents.

As of July 2015, ATEN holds 466 approved global patents.

KVM

- KVM Switches: Desktop, Cat 5, over IP, Matrix, Rack, Secure
- Computer Sharing Devices
- Extenders
- Modules & Accessories
- Management Software
- Serial Console Server

Professional Audiovisual

- Control System
- Matrix Switches: Modular, Video
- Extenders: HDBaseT, Optical, Wireless
- Splitters
- Adapters

Energy Intelligence Rack PDU

- Metered PDU: Ready, Outlet, Outlet-Switched, Outlet-Critical-Load
- Switched PDU
- Energy & DCIM Management Software
- Energy Monitoring Device
- KVM PDU

Mobility and USB

- Gamepad Emulator
- Host Controller Cards
- Tap (USB to Bluetooth Keyboard/Mouse Switch)
- USB: Converters, Extenders, Peripheral Switches
- USB/FireWire Hubs

Data Communication

- RS-232 Printer Switches
- Network Printer Switches
- RS-232 Interface Converters

Cables

- KVM: DVI, PS/2, PS/2-USB, USB
- AV: HDMI, DVI, DisplayPort, VGA
- Other: Cat 6

== Environmental record ==
ATEN is ISO 14001:2004 UKAS compliant.

== See also ==
- List of companies of Taiwan
- KVM
- Smart environment
- Video wall
- Information technology management
- Electrical cable
- Power distribution units
