= Nordwalde =

- Town
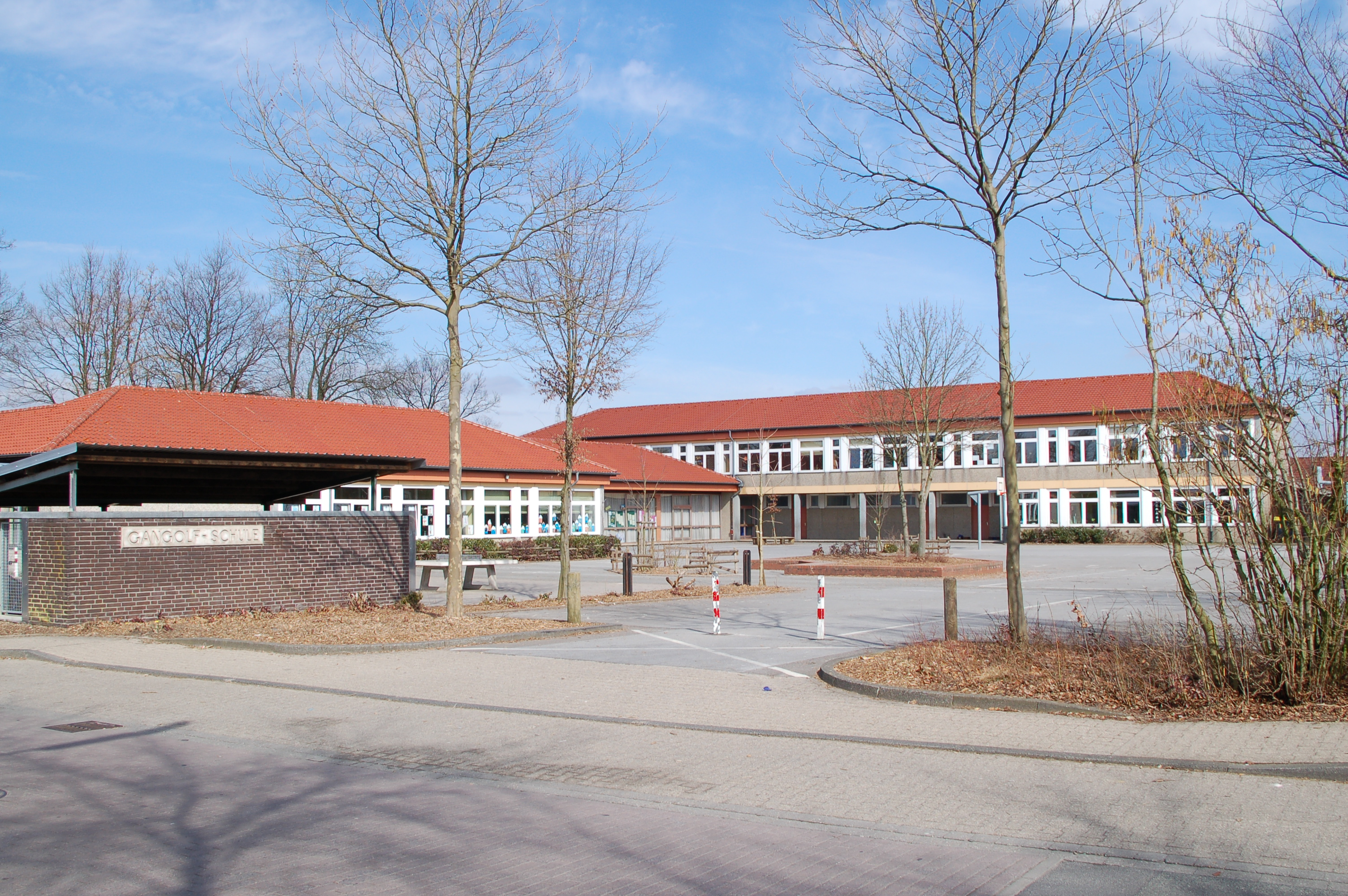
- Elementary School in Nordwalde

- Coat of arms

- Location of Nordwalde within Steinfurt district
- Interactive map of Nordwalde
- Location within Germany Location within North Rhine-Westphalia
- Coordinates: 52°05′N 7°29′E
- Country: Germany
- State: North Rhine-Westphalia
- Admin. region: Münster
- District: Steinfurt
- Subdivisions: 6

Government
  - Mayor (2020–25): Sonja Schemmann (CDU)

Area
  - Total: 51.6 km^{2} (19.9 sq mi)
- Elevation: 55 m (180 ft)

Population (2025-12-31)
  - Total: 10,084
  - Density: 195/km^{2} (506/sq mi)
- Time zone: UTC+01:00 (CET)
  - Summer (DST): UTC+02:00 (CEST)
- Postal codes: 48356
- Dialling codes: 02573
- Vehicle registration: ST, BF, TE
- Website: www.nordwalde.de

Nordwalde (literally: north woods) is a municipality in the district of Steinfurt, in North Rhine-Westphalia, Germany.

== Geography ==
It is situated in the Münsterland area, approximately 12 km south-east of Steinfurt and 20 km north-west of Münster. The distance to the Dutch border is about 30 km.

=== Neighbouring municipalities ===
- Greven
- Emsdetten
- Altenberge
- Steinfurt

=== Division of the town ===
Nordwalde consists of 6 districts:

- Nordwalde
- Feldbauerschaft
- Kirchbauerschaft
- Scheddebrock
- Suttorf
- Westerode

== Population ==
Historical population

Year	Pop.	±% p.a.
1965	6,798	—
1970	7,404	+1.72%
1975	7,753	+0.93%
1980	8,195	+1.12%
1985	8,645	+1.07%
1990	8,612	−0.08%
1995	9,071	+1.04%

Year	Pop.	±% p.a.
2000	9,410	+0.74%
2005	9,551	+0.30%
2010	9,373	−0.38%
2015	9,388	+0.03%
2020	9,683	+0.62%
2025	10,084	+0.81%

Source: Landesdatabank Nordrhein-Westfalen

== Twin towns ==
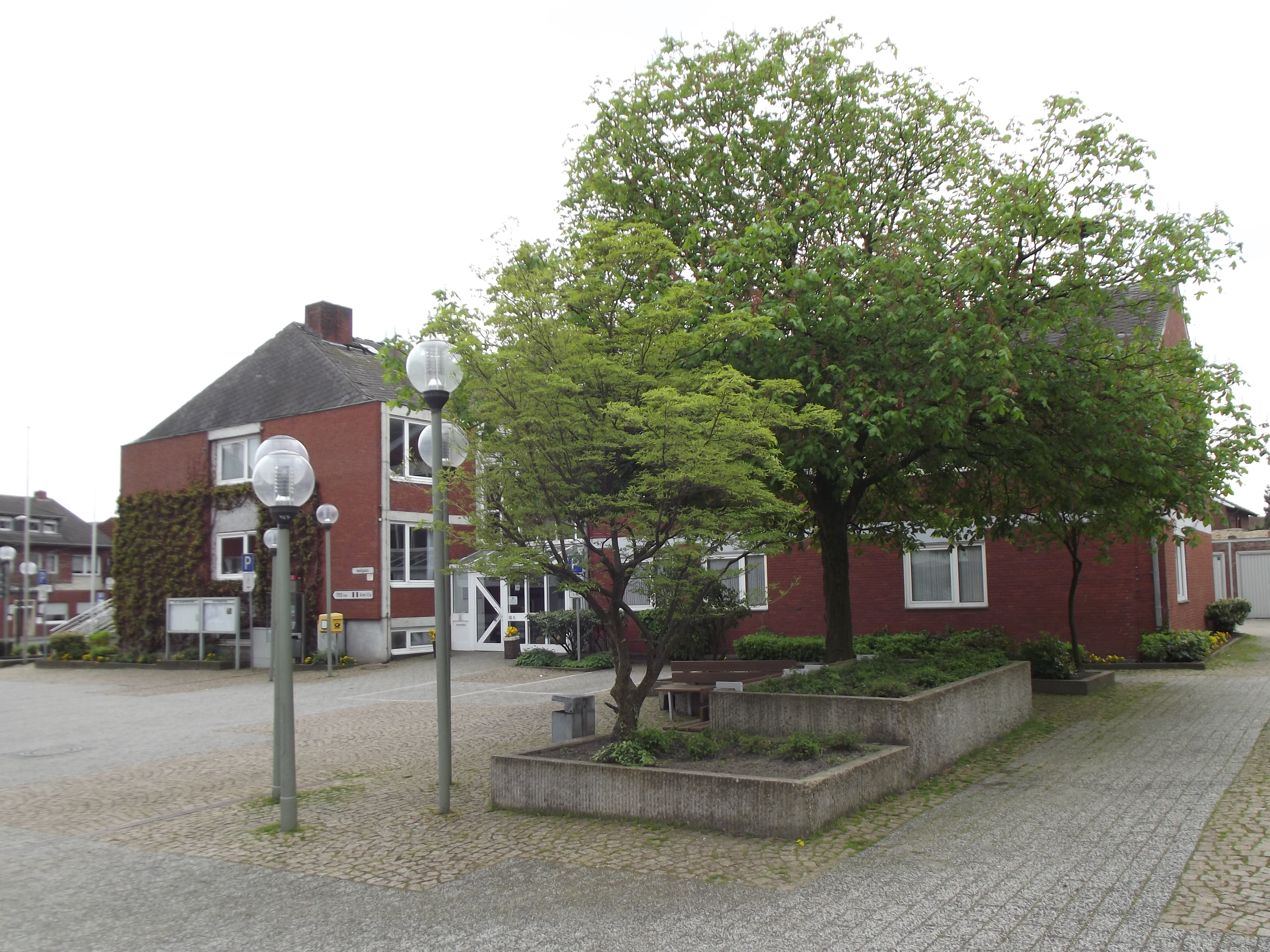
The Amilly Square in the centre of Nordwalde

- Amilly, France
- Treuenbrietzen, Germany

== Transport ==
Nordwalde has a stop at the line RB64 (Münster–Enschede railway) from Muenster to Enschede. Also local busses connect Nordwalde to the public transport. Nordwalde is located in the area of the fare association Westfalen-Tarif, zone number 52560.

== People ==
- August Hanning (born 1946), German former high-ranking German security official at BND
