= Friedrich Ostendorff =

German politician (born 1953)

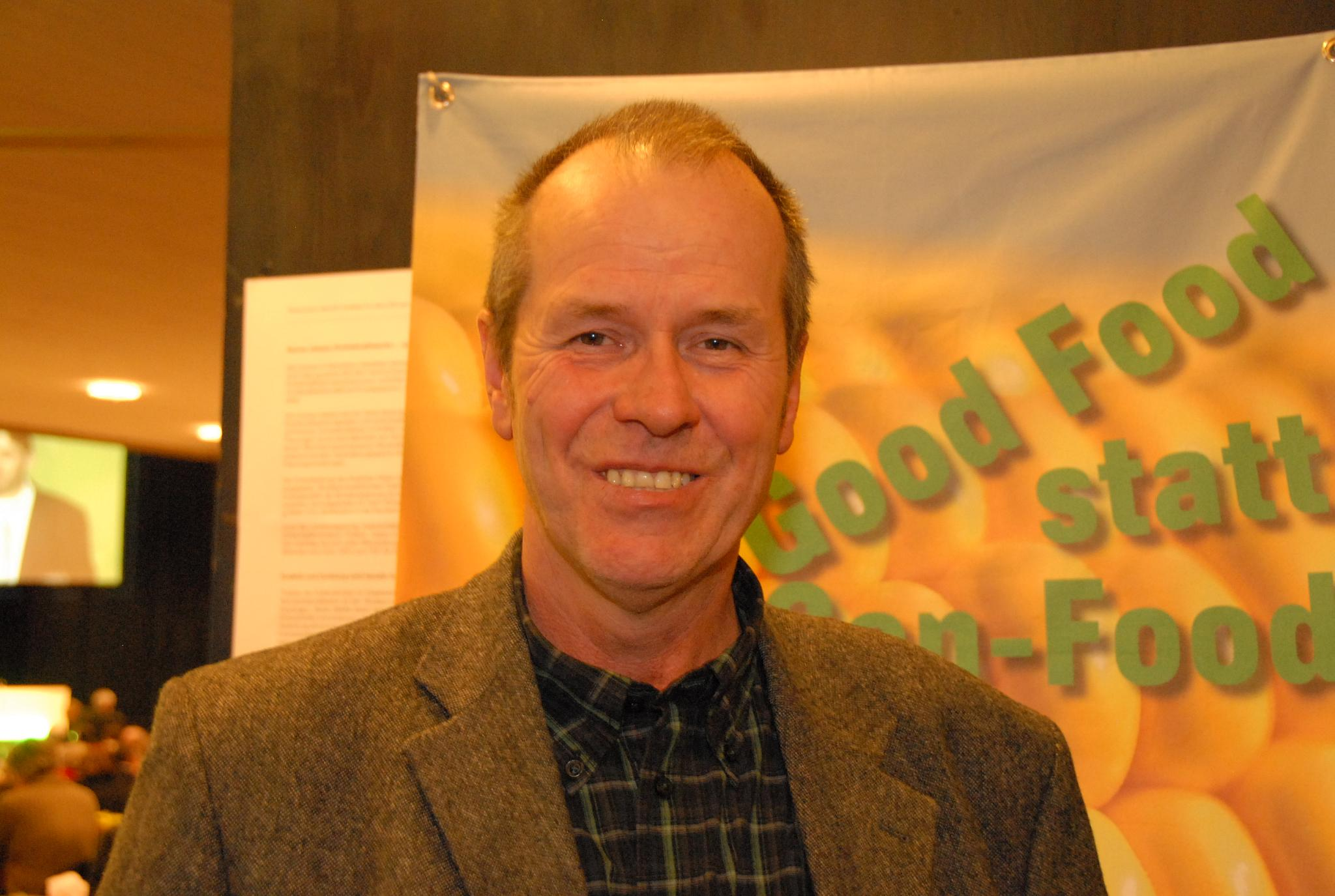
- Friedrich Ostendorff in 2008

Member of the Bundestag for North Rhine-Westphalia
- Incumbent
- Assumed office 27 October 2009
- Constituency: Alliance 90/The Greens List
- In office 17 October 2002 – 18 October 2005
- Constituency: Alliance 90/The Greens List

Personal details
- Born: 12 January 1953 (age 73) Dortmund, West Germany (now Germany)
- Party: Greens

Friedrich Ostendorff (born 12 January 1953) is a German politician. Born in Dortmund, North Rhine-Westphalia, he represents the Alliance 90/The Greens. Friedrich Ostendorff has served as a member of the Bundestag from the state of North Rhine-Westphalia from 2002 till 2005 and since 2009.

== Life ==
After the intermediate school-leaving certificate at the Realschule Oberaden in Bergkamen in 1968 and the subsequent agricultural training from 1968 to 1974, Ostendorff completed his master craftsman's examination as a farmer in 1974. Since 1971, he has been a member of the Westphalia-Lippe Rural Youth. In 1977, an agricultural internship abroad in Japan followed and in 1978 he finally took over his parents' farm in Bergkamen-Weddinghofen. Today, his wife runs the organic farm. In 1983 he converted his farm to organic farming. He is a member of the Bundestag Committee for Food and Agriculture. For his parliamentary group, he is spokesman for agricultural policy.
