= August Hanning =

German civil servant (born 1946)

President of the Federal Intelligence Service
- In office 1998–2005
- Preceded by: Hansjörg Geiger
- Succeeded by: Ernst Uhrlau

Personal details
- Born: 16 February 1946 (age 80) Nordwalde, British occupation zone, Allied-occupied Germany
- Education: University of Münster

August Hanning (born 16 February 1946) is a former high-ranking German security official (civil servant, Beamter) and a businessman in the private security consulting sector. From 1998 to 2005, he served as President of Germany's foreign intelligence agency, the Federal Intelligence Service (BND). He was state secretary at the Federal Ministry of the Interior from 2005 to 2009.

On 6 October 2026, Hanning was arrested by the Federal Criminal Police Office (BKA) on the orders of the Federal Public Prosecutor General on suspicion of treasonous espionage, the betrayal of state secrets, attempted high treason, and acting as an intelligence agent for a foreign power.

== Early life and education ==
August Hanning was born on 16 February 1946 in Nordwalde, North Rhine-Westphalia. His father owned two brickyards. He graduated from high school in Osnabrück, Lower Saxony, in 1966. Hanning studied law in Freiburg im Breisgau and Münster. He received a doctorate in law at the University of Münster in 1975.

== Government career ==
From 1986 to 1990, Hanning was the head of internal counter-espionage at the Permanent Representation of the Federal Republic of Germany in East Germany, a embassy-equivalent organisation for West Germany in East Berlin. In this capacity, he was also responsible for the prisoner release program between West Germany and East Germany. In 1990, Hanning returned to the Federal Chancellery, where he became a close associate of Bernd Schmidbauer, the official responsible for the federal intelligence Services of the chancellery. In 1996, he was appointed head of department and coordinator of the federal intelligence services. As the highest-ranking official of all Germany security agencies, he served under federal interior minister Wolfgang Schäuble (CDU). Hanning became the president of the Federal Intelligence Service in December 1998. His chief of staff was Manfred D.

In 2001, Murat Kurnaz, a Turkish citizen and legal resident of Germany, was abducted and held in extrajudicial detention by the United States. He faced torture at a US base in Kandahar and at the Guantanamo Bay detention camp. By 2002, intelligence officials of the United States and Germany had concluded that accusations against Kurnaz were groundless, and the US offered to release him back to Germany. Despite this, on 29 October 2002, Hanning pleaded for "an entry ban for Germany". Due to this, Kurnaz was kept at the Guantanamo Bay detention camp and tortured for five more years.

In December 2002, Hanning wrote a letter to CIA director George Tenet claiming that allegations made by the whistleblower "Curveball" about Iraq and weapons of mass destruction were "judged as plausible and convincing". This information served as rationale for the 2003 invasion of Iraq. The claim of Iraq having weapons of mass destruction turned out to be false, and the United States blamed Germany for providing incorrect information.

In 2005 Hanning became state secretary at the Federal Ministry of the Interior. Manfred D. moved to the Interior Ministry with Hanning and remained his assistant. In 2009 Hanning retired. Manfred D. served from March 2012 to March 2026 once again as chief of staff to several BND presidents. In 2015, Hanning drafted a "ten-point program" for how he believed the German government should have dealt with the 2015 European migrant crisis. He proposed closing Germany's borders and restricting family reunification, among other policies.

== Intelligence work for the private sector ==
Hanning received a state pension of around €11,000 (based on his former base salary in Group B11 (~€15,900) in service). Immediately after leaving government service Hanning began working in the private sector in his field of expertise as an attorney and legal consultant. Hanning and members of his family hold shares in the business intelligence company GSC4. He is member of the nonprofit organization "United against nuclear Iran".

=== Manfred Dankesreiter ===
The German Public Prosecutor General (GBA) alleged that in the spring of 2010, Hanning and Manfred Dankesreiter agreed that Dankesreiter would continuously procure valuable intelligence from the Federal Intelligence Service (BND) for Hanning in exchange for payment. The GBA alleged that Hanning had intended to profitably use this information within the scope of the private consultancy work. Over the years up to June 2022, Manfred Dankesreiter provided the accused Hanning with approximately two thousand documents, including a large number of items classified as restricted or secret. The material was intended exclusively for the internal purposes of the Federal Intelligence Service. It served to inform and prepare the agency's leadership, particularly for the intelligence situation briefing (ND-Lage) held regularly at the Federal Chancellery involving senior officials from federal ministries and all German security agencies.

=== Azerbaijan ===
Hanning served on the board of the German-Azerbaijani Forum, a network facing criticism for lobbying on behalf of the autocratic regime in Baku. He got elected to the board in 2013. When Germany's relations with Azerbaijan cooled down as a result of the Azerbaijani laundromat scheme, Hanning still remained on the board. Hanning got re-elected to the board in 2025. In 2026 he was suspected of having ties to the Special State Protection Service of Azerbaijan.

=== Pluteos ===
Hanning was a member of the board of Swiss intelligence company Pluteos alongside the German consultant Samuel Danilowitsch. Danilowitsch provides financial and legal advice to companies in the oil and gas sector; he was involved in investments in Russia. They also worked with Thorsten Mehlers, former head of Internal Investigations Unit (DIE) of LKA Hamburg.

Pluetos facilitated a deal involving business jets sold to the Middle East that were to be retrofitted for espionage purposes. In November 2019, the United Arab Emirates Air Force unveiled its plans for a new surveillance aircraft to the public; two Bombardier Challenger 650 was to be equipped with spy technology. The Abu Dhabi-based company Aquila Aerospace was to modify the aircraft so that—according to the company—they could "collect and transmit large amounts of data, voice, video, imagery, and tactical 3D information." Danilowitsch acted as a representative for Aquila. Pluteos advised Aquila, and Danilowitsch was simultaneously a co-managing director of Aquila. In February 2019, August Hanning also traveled to Abu Dhabi and spoke with the then Prince Mohammed bin Zayed Al Nahyan, later President of the UAE.

In 2020, Hanning's name surfaced in connection with the scandal surrounding the US company Augustus Intelligence. German politician Philipp Amthor had attempted to lobby the Federal Ministry of Economics on behalf of the New York-based start-up and received stock options in the company in return. Hanning also maintained ties to Augustus and visited the firm in New York. Hanning also got stock options in the company for unclear consulting services. The company claimed to operate in the field of artificial intelligence, though what Augustus actually did was unclear. In 2021 the company went bankrupt.

=== PNB Banka ===
In late 2013, Russian businessman Grigory Guselnikov became the new major shareholder of the Latvian bank PNB Banka. To fund his expansion plans, Guselnikov secured $75 million from Russian industrialist Pyotr Kondrashev, who also wished to invest in PNB Banka. However, the two men fell out over the project. In 2016, Kondrashev engaged Hanning through Hanning's consulting firm System 360 to mediate the dispute. Hanning's mediation failed, and the conflict between Guselnikov and Kondrashev continued. Just over a year later, in 2017, Hanning joined the supervisory board of PNB Banka. Former NATO Secretary General and Danish Prime Minister Anders Fogh Rasmussen later joined as well. Hanning earned €12,000 a month.

The Latvian financial sector was notorious for money laundering activities. PNB Banka went bankrupt. The insolvency administrator accused Hanning of breaching his supervisory duties. The Latvian police investigated him and a large portion of Hanning's pension was seized. In 2022, Hanning wrote a letter to Chancellor Olaf Scholz asking him to advocate on Hanning's behalf during a visit to Latvia.

=== Block family and CGI Group ===
The Block family is a wealthy entrepreneurial family from Hamburg. Christina Block, the heiress to the steakhouse chain Block House, has been embroiled in a custody dispute with her ex-husband over two of her four children since 2018. The Block family engaged Hanning's company, System 360. According to investigations, Hanning and his colleague Thorsten Mehlers from System 360/Pluteos planned to portray the ex-husband as a pedophile; to this end, his employees allegedly planted a storage device containing child pornography in the garden of ex-husband. Furthermore, Mehlers and Hanning allegedly attempted to abduct two of the children from their father in 2022 and take them to their mother. According to media reports, Hanning then approached Yaakov Peri, the former head of the Israeli domestic intelligence agency Shin Bet and current head of the private security firm CGI Group in Tel Aviv, directly and asked for support with operations on behalf of Christina Block.

In September 2025 Hamburg police searched several buildings and apartments belonging to Hanning to find evidence in the Block case.

== Legal issues ==
=== Christina Block case ===
In 2025, Christina Block, heiress to Germany's steakhouse chain Block House was arrested on charges of aggravated child abduction, grievous bodily harm, and unlawful detention. It is alleged that she hired an Israeli spy firm to violently kidnap her children from her ex-husband in Denmark and bring them to Germany. The children were kidnapped and brought to Baden-Württemberg where Block picked them up before police successfully returned them to Denmark. Hanning is alleged to have put Block in contact with the Israeli spy firm and is an alleged accomplice in the kidnapping.

Hanning and Thorsten Mehlers were also accused of accepting a commission from Block of more than $112,000 in exchange for the child kidnapping. Hanning denied any involvement and also denied having contacted Yaakov Peri. Peri is said to have assembled the Israeli team that carried out the violent kidnapping. An alleged Israeli participant was extradited from Cyprus to Germany and brought to court. Two other suspects from Israel remain at large.

=== Espionage charges ===
During the searches at Hanning properties for the Christina Block case, the Hamburg police found current material from the Federal Intelligence Service (BND) classified as "Secret" at his offices in Berlin. However, this fact did not become public. In May 2026, the Hamburg Public Prosecutor's Office handed over its investigation to the Federal Public Prosecutor General (GBA).

German police arrested Hanning on 6 October 2026, at his home in Nordwalde. He was charged with espionage and attempted treason. An alleged accomplice, identified publicly as Manfred Dankesreiter, was also arrested in Bad Tölz on charges of "aiding and abetting attempted treason and treasonous espionage" after having allegedly provided Hanning with approximately 2,000 classified documents in exchange for money after Hanning had left office. Some of the documents apparently date back as far as the spring of 2022 and included information about the Iranian nuclear program and military intelligence regarding the Russian armed forces.

Prosecutors alleged that Hanning intended to resell the documents and that he used them to "draft an analysis for an officer of a foreign intelligence service". Bayerischer Rundfunk assumes that Hanning may have passed information on to Israeli services. According to Der Spiegel, Hanning wrote an intelligence analysis and handed it over to an officer of the Special State Protection Service of Azerbaijan.

An article by The Times reports that Hanning had also supplied confidential political information over a period of several years to Wang Jianzheng, a retired Chinese army major general and diplomat. When asked, Wang said he had not been in contact with Hanning for a "long time."

Der Spiegel reported that the BND had been aware for some time of the work performed by its employee Manfred Dankesreiter for former BND President August Hanning. According to Der Spiegel, the BND issued official authorisation for this activity to Manfred Dankesreiter
