= Frances Townsend =

American lawyer (born 1961)

Fran Townsend
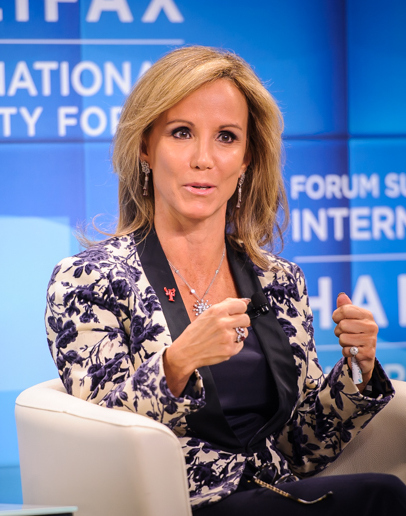

3rd United States Homeland Security Advisor
- In office July 28, 2004 – March 30, 2008
- President: George W. Bush
- Preceded by: John Gordon
- Succeeded by: Ken Wainstein

Personal details
- Born: Frances Mary Fragos; December 28, 1961 (age 64) Mineola, New York, U.S.
- Spouse: John Townsend
- Children: 2
- Education: American University (BA, BS); University of San Diego (JD)

Frances M. "Fran" Fragos Townsend (born December 28, 1961) is an American lawyer and business executive who served as Homeland Security Advisor to United States President George W. Bush from 2004 to 2007, and was formerly the executive vice president for corporate affairs, corporate secretary, and compliance chief officer for Activision Blizzard, until September 2022, due to Microsoft acquiring Blizzard for $75 billion. She previously served as Deputy Assistant to the President and Deputy National Security Advisor for Combating Terrorism. In 2008, Townsend joined CNN as a contributor, but later switched over to CBS where she is a national security analyst. Townsend was president of the Counter Extremism Project.

== Early life, education, and family ==
Frances Mary Fragos was born on December 28, 1961, in Mineola, New York, the daughter of John Fragos, a Greek American roofer, and Dorothy Townsend, an Irish American office manager for a construction company. Raised in Wantagh, Long Island, Townsend was the first in her family to finish high school. At the age of 11, she penned letters requesting that she be allowed to be an altar boy, first to her priest, then to the bishop, the cardinal, and ultimately to the Vatican. After her requests were refused, her priest caught her trying to sneak into Mass with a borrowed robe.

Townsend graduated cum laude from the American University in 1982, receiving a B.A. in political science and a B.S. in psychology. She received her J.D. from the University of San Diego School of Law in 1984.

Frances Fragos married lawyer John Michael Townsend on October 8, 1994, in an Episcopal ceremony at Manhattan's Church of the Incarnation. As of 2006, they have two children, both sons. With a self-professed "triple type-A" personality, Townsend has been described as having a characteristic bluntness and a "sometimes salty, streetwise style" that once led her coworkers to nickname her "The Hurricane".

== Career ==
=== Government ===
Townsend began her prosecutorial career in 1985, serving as an assistant district attorney in Brooklyn, New York. She gained the support and mentorship of federal prosecutors Rudolph Giuliani and Louis Freeh. In 1988, she was hired by Giuliani for the United States Attorney's Office for the Southern District of New York where she worked on white-collar crime. Townsend also ran the office's organized crime unit, where she conducted one-on-one interviews with members of the Gambino crime family.

Townsend moved to the Justice Department in the early 1990s to work on international legal matters. In 1991, she worked in the Office of the Attorney General to assist in establishing the newly created Office of International Programs, the predecessor to the Executive Office for National Security. In December 1993, she joined the Criminal Division where she served as Chief of Staff to the Assistant Attorney General, where she took part in establishing the Division's international training and rule of law programs.

During the Clinton administration, Townsend served in a series of positions at the Justice Department, eventually working as intelligence policy counsel for Attorney General Janet Reno. She served as Director of the Office of International Affairs in the Criminal Division from November 1995 until November 1997, when she was appointed Acting Deputy Assistant Attorney General. Townsend was appointed Counsel for Intelligence Policy in March 1998, heading the office of Intelligence Policy and Review, whose various functions included approving intelligence-gathering activities related to the Foreign Intelligence Surveillance Act. Townsend managed the Justice Department's Office of Intelligence Policy and Review until 2001. She was one of Reno's key advisers, acting as a "back channel" between the attorney general and FBI Special Agent John P. O'Neill, who was also her friend. The incoming Bush administration did not opt to keep Townsend on. Instead, she served as Assistant Commandant for Intelligence for the United States Coast Guard. While she was on maternity leave during the September 11 attacks in 2001, Townsend assisted the Coast Guard in updating intelligence legislation to switch the branch's priority from drug smuggling to the vulnerability of U.S. ports.

Despite concerns about Townsend's past as a Democratic appointee, Secretary of State Condoleezza Rice hired her for the National Security Council in Spring 2003 at the urging of counterterrorism chief Richard A. Clarke and Homeland Security Advisor John A. Gordon. In December 2003, she coordinated government terrorism responses that led to the grounding of flights from Europe during the holiday season. She was appointed Assistant to the President for Homeland Security and Counterterrorism on May 28, 2004. During her tenure, she oversaw an intelligence reorganization and conducted the first post-9/11 review of the White House's anti-terrorism campaign. Townsend served as the public face of the Bush administration while it was under criticism for allegedly overreacting to dated intelligence in its decision to raise terrorist threat levels during an election season. She also inspected Iraq's Abu Ghraib prison as an envoy of President Bush. Townsend was tapped to implement broad changes in the intelligence community recommended by a presidential commission headed by former Senator Chuck Robb and U.S. District Judge Laurence Silberman.

Townsend then served in the United States Department of Justice, including a stint as Counsel to the Attorney General for Intelligence Policy in the George W. Bush administration. In May 2007, she was appointed "National Continuity Coordinator" under the auspices of National Security Presidential Directive (NSPD) 51.

In 2014, Townsend became the President of the Counter Extremism Project, an organization devoted to fighting global extremism, including a program that studies the digital strategy of groups like the Islamic State of Iraq and Greater Syria (ISIS) in an effort to combat their success at spreading propaganda online.

In November 2016, the UAE Ambassador to the United States Yousef Al Otaiba recommended through real estate investor and Trump ally Thomas Barrack that Townsend become President Donald Trump's Director of National Intelligence or Secretary of Homeland Security. In May 2017, Townsend was on the short list for the Director of the FBI following James Comey's firing.

=== Business ===
From 2010 to 2021, Townsend served as vice chairman, general counsel, and chief administrative officer at MacAndrews & Forbes.

In March 2021, Townsend joined Activision Blizzard as executive vice president for corporate affairs, corporate secretary, and chief compliance officer to oversee government affairs, public policy, and communications. While serving as executive vice president of Activision Blizzard, an open letter signed by over 2,000 employees called for Townsend "to stand by her word to step down as Executive Sponsor of the ABK Employee Women's Network" due to her criticized response to a California Department of Fair Employment and Housing lawsuit. It was later revealed that Activision Blizzard CEO Bobby Kotick had written the letter and not Townsend.

Afterwards, Townsend stated that Activision was working to remove employees guilty of bad behavior and had "exited" 20 employees, with another 20 facing disciplinary action.

=== Boards ===
Townsend was previously appointed to the U.S. President's Intelligence Advisory Board.

Townsend is a director on the boards of Chubb and Freeport McMoRan. She also currently serves on the boards of the Council on Foreign Relations, the Trilateral Commission, and the International Republican Institute.

She is a trustee of the Atlantic Council, the Center for Strategic and International Studies, the Intrepid Sea, Air & Space Museum, the McCain Institute, and the New York City Police Foundation.

In July 2022, Townsend helped found a group of U.S. business and policy leaders who share the goal of constructively engaging with China in order to improve U.S.–China relations.

Political offices
Preceded by John Gordon	United States Homeland Security Advisor; 2004–2008	Succeeded by Ken Wainstein
