= List of major crimes in Japan =

This is a list of documented major crimes in Japan.

Date	Name	Deaths	Location	Summary
1923–1924	Satarō Fukiage	7	Kantō and Chūbu	Fukiage raped and murdered six girls. He also raped and murdered a girl in 1906. Exact victim estimates are unknown but one theory puts the number at 93 while another put it at more than 100. Fukiage was executed in 1926.
1925	Aoyama-kai / Mitani-kumi gang war	3+	near Yokohama	In one of the largest battles between Yakuza groups, members of the Aoyama-kai and around thirty gangs led by the Mitani-kumi are involved in a dispute over a construction contract for Tokyo Denryoku Construction in Kanagawa. Aoyama-kai is a subcontractor of Shimizu-gumi and Shimizu-gumi is losing trust due to Hazama-gumi's obstruction, which they regard as Mitani-kumi's interference. After six hours of fighting, reportedly between 600 and 2,000 gangsters are involved with weapons including rifles, pistols, swords and farm implements. The Tokyo police and the Kempei-Tai were called in after the Kawasaki police became unable to handle the situation and, although Japanese officials declared martial law, fighting did not end until a cannon was brought in by the Aoyama-gumi. The battle injured over 150 people and killed at least three.
1936	Sada Abe	1	Tokyo	Sada Abe and Kichizo Ishida (her lover) engaged in erotic asphyxiation resulting in his death. When he died she then cut off his penis and testicles and carried them around with her in a handbag. Because her way of killing him was erotic, her crime gave inspiration to Japanese films, such as Nagisa Oshima's In the Realm of the Senses.
1938	Tsuyama massacre	31	rural hamlets near Tsuyama, Okayama	After cutting off electricity to his village, 21-year-old Mutsuo Toi proceeded to go on a late-night killing spree with a shotgun, a katana, and an axe before killing himself.
1941–1942	Hamamatsu serial murders	9–11	near Hamamatsu, Shizuoka	A deaf boy, Seisaku Nakamura murdered people in Shizuoka. He attempted to rape women and murder his family. He was arrested for nine murders in 1942. He admitted two other murders. He was sentenced to death.
1946–1948	Kotobuki San'in incident	5–84	Tokyo	Miyuki Ishikawa, midwife and director of maternity home, fatally neglected 85 babies, along with several accomplices.
1945–1946	Yoshio Kodaira	7–10	Tokyo, Tochigi	Former soldier Yoshio Kodaira raped and murdered ten women. In China, he admitted that he committed numerous war crimes. He also killed his father-in-law in 1932. Kodaira was executed in 1949.
1948	Teigin Bank robbery	12	Shiina, Toshima, Tokyo	Sixteen people, employees of a branch of Imperial Bank (Teikoku Ginkō, aka Teigin) and their family, are poisoned by cyanide after taking chemicals given to them by a man claiming to be from the health authorities who claimed they were medication to control a nearby dysentery outbreak. The man then stole 160,000 yen before making his escape. Twelve people died. Sadamichi Hirasawa, a painter, was arrested several months later. Although sentenced to death, there were strong suspicions that he was wrongfully convicted, and successive Justice Ministers refused to sign his death warrant, resulting in a stay of execution. During his 33-year imprisonment he wrote his autobiography and died of natural causes in 1987. (Alluded to in Ian Fleming's novel You Only Live Twice: "And down went the honourable medicine and down fell the honourable local manager and staff of the Imperial Bank of Japan. The medicine had been neat cyanide.")
1948–1952	Osen Korogashi incident	8	Chiba, Shizuoka, Tochigi	Serial killer Genzo Kurita murders eight people. He commits necrophilia with several victims and murders a family at the cliff called Osen Korogashi. He is executed in 1959.
1959	The murder of a BOAC flight attendant	1	Suginami, Tokyo	A Japanese woman working as a flight attendant for British Overseas Airways Corporation was found dead under the bridge in a river in March 1959. A Belgian Catholic priest who was her ex-boyfriend was considered a person of interest and possible suspect, but he suddenly went back to Belgium in June that year. The case remains unsolved.
1960	The assassination of Inejiro Asanuma	1	Hibiya, Tokyo	The head of the Japan Socialist Party is stabbed to death by a 17-year-old right-wing extremist Otoya Yamaguchi at a televised rally.
1960	Poisoned Milk Murders	3	Saitama Prefecture	A 31-year-old man who was working for the then state-owned Japan National Railways, had ordered milk for his family. The man, his 4-year-old son, and 2-year-old daughter died after drinking the milk. A neighboring woman who was the wife of another Japan National Railways employee, confessed to tampering with the milk and putting pesticide in the milk.
1963	Murder of Yoshinobu Murakoshi	1	Taito, Tokyo	4 year-old Yoshinobu Murakoshi fails to come home from a local park; several days later his family receives a phone call demanding ransom. Police fail to apprehend the person who collected the ransom, and the case generated massive publicity. Two years later they identified Tamotsu Kohara as the kidnapper, who admitted under questioning to have murdered the child. He is executed in 1971.
1963–1964	Akira Nishiguchi	5	through Japan	Serial killer Akira Nishiguchi cheats people, escapes from police officers, and kills five people. He is executed in 1970. His crimes became the basis for a book by Ryūzō Saki and the Shohei Imamura film Vengeance Is Mine.
1965	Zama and Shibuya shootings	1	Kanagawa Prefecture, Tokyo	18-year-old Misao Katagiri goes on a rampage with a rifle. He shoots two police officers in Zama city, Kanagawa prefecture then hijacks several cars. A gun battle between the gunman and hundreds of special police ensues at a gun store in Shibuya, Tokyo. He is suppressed by police and sentenced to death, and executed in 1972.
1968	Norio Nagayama's robbery spree	4	Tokyo, Kyoto, Hakodate, Nagoya	A series of high-profile robberies in which 19-year-old Norio Nagayama robs people for their money after killing them with a handgun stolen from the US military. After controversial trials, the Supreme Court upholds Nagayama's death in 1990. He is executed in 1997.
1968	300 million yen robbery	-	Fuchū, Tokyo	Disguised as a police officer, an unidentified man stops a security van belonging to the Toshiba Corporation near Tokyo's Fuchu Prison and, in the guise conducting a bomb search, hijacks the van successfully escaping with almost 300 million yen. Despite a massive investigation into what would become the largest robbery in Japanese history, neither the man nor the money was ever found.
1968	Tochigi patricide case	1	Tochigi	Chiyo Aizawa murders her own father. She is an incest victim of her father. In 1973, the supreme court of Japan sentences her to a suspended sentence, saying that the article 200 of penal code is a breach of Japanese constitution. Her sentence becomes the first unconstitutional judgment for the supreme court.
1968 and 2000	Murder, hostage, and attempted murder committed by Kim Hiro	2	Shizuoka and Busan	A Korean man in Japan murdered 2 people at a nightclub in Shizuoka. He then took 13 people hostage at a hot spring. He had justified his crimes against innocent civilians, claiming that he was fighting against racism in Japanese society in general. While in prison, it was revealed that he had received special treatment compared to other prisoners which resulted in suicides and resignations of people in the Justice Ministry and the prison. He was sentenced to life in prison in 1975. He was released in 1999 to go back to his home country, South Korea, on the grounds that he would never be able to set foot in Japan again. In 2000 while in Busan, South Korea, he attempted to murder the husband of the woman he was seeing. He was sent to prison, but released again in 2003. He died in Busan in 2010.
1970	Inland Sea ferry hijacking	1	Hiroshima and the Inland Sea	An armed 20-year-old escaping police hijacks a ferry and takes the crew and passengers hostage. He is shot dead by a police sniper the following morning. The moment that he was shot dead was telecast. This incident is the first example of shooting a criminal to death in Japan.
1971	Kiyoshi Ōkubo	8	Gunma Prefecture	Serial killer Kiyoshi Ōkubo rapes and murders eight women during 41 days. Ōkubo is sentenced to death in 1973 and is executed in 1976.
1971–1972	Purge incident	12	Gunma prefecture	The United Red Army torture and murder their twelve members in base camps. They call the murders "purification". The incident comes to light after the Asama-Sanso incident.
1972	Asama-Sanso incident	2	Karuizawa, Nagano prefecture	Five armed left-wing terrorists of the United Red Army hold up in a mountainside holiday lodge, taking one hostage. Amidst live TV coverage, police storm the lodge after a ten-day standoff, resulting in the deaths of two policemen.
1973	Kidnapping of Kim Dae-Jung	-	Chiyoda, Tokyo	South Korean dissident Kim Dae-Jung, later to be president, is kidnapped from his hotel room in Tokyo by KCIA agents and taken to South Korea.
1974	Mitsubishi Heavy Industries bombing	8	Chiyoda, Tokyo	A terrorist bombing attack took place at the Mitsubishi Heavy Industries headquarters in Tokyo, which left 8 people dead and another 376 injured. A terrorist organization by the name of East Asia Anti-Japan Armed Front claimed responsibility for the attack.
1979	Mitsubishi Bank sporting gun kidnapping	5	Osaka	Akiyoshi Umekawa shot dead four people in a Mitsubishi Bank. His motivation is probably robbery at first, but he takes about 40 hostages and does anything he wants. Osaka police shoot him dead two days later. This would be the last incident of police fatally shooting a criminal suspect until the 2018 fatal knife attack at a police box in Sendai.
1979-	North Kanto Serial Young Girl Kidnapping and Murder Case	4–5	North Kanto	Since 1979 there have been five cases of kidnapping and/or murder of young girls between ages 4–8 (four kidnappings and murders, one kidnapping where the kidnapped girl was never found) occurring within a 20 kilometer radius near to the border between Tochigi and Gunma prefectures. All of these cases took place in Ota City of Gunma prefecture or Ashikaga city of Tochigi prefecture, and there is evidence connecting them. An investigative journalist allegedly found the culprit in 2010 and presented the police with evidence including DNA test results connecting him to the Ashikaga murder case, but no arrests have been made.
1980	Shinjuku bus attack	6	Shinjuku, Tokyo	A mentally disturbed man throws a bucket of petrol and a lit newspaper into a bus. The ensuing fire killed 6 and injured 14. He kills himself in 1997.
1982	Japan Airlines Flight 350	24	Tokyo Bay	Mentally disturbed Captain Seiji Katagiri forces the Japan Airlines Flight 350 to crash. 24 passengers are killed by the crash. He is arrested on suspicion of professional negligence resulting in deaths, but he is not indicted due to his insanity.
1983	Kiyotaka Katsuta	8–22	Kansai and Chūbu	Kiyotaka Katsuta is arrested for a robbery-murder. However he is suspected of a total of 22 murders later, and he admits eight murders. Katsuta is executed in 2000.
1984	Glico Morinaga case	-	Various, across Kansai	A 17-month-long series of extortion against confectionery companies starting in a kidnap of the president of Glico and involving confectionery spiked with cyanide.
1985–1989	Yama-Ichi War	29	Kansai region	A Yakuza gang war between the Yamaguchi-gumi and the breakaway Ichiwa-kai faction that began over the death of kumicho Kazuo Taoka. After being passed over as kumicho, Hiroshi Yamamoto broke away from the Yamaguchi-gumi, formed the rival Ichiwa-kai, and had Taoko's successor, Masahisa Takenaka, murdered, along with two other Yamaguchi members. Following the assassination, Yamaguchi-gumi boss Kazuo Nakanishi vows to wipe out the Ichiwa-kai. During the next few years, the two gangs would engage in an estimated 200 gun battles, killing 26 gangsters and seriously wounding many more, with local newspapers carrying daily "scorecards" of the latest body counts.
1987–1989	Kyoko Kuroda and Michiyo Okabe nude murder case	2	Akashi and Kobe	Serial killer Kazuhisa Yoneda murdered and engaged in necrophilia with two naked girls, Michiyo Okabe (岡部三千代 Okabe Michiyo, 18-year-old Akashi Junior College girl) and Kyoko Kuroda (黒田恭子 Kuroda Kyoko, 20-year-old Kobe Gakuin University girl).
1988	Affair of the Four Children of Sugamo	1	Toshima, Tokyo	Four malnourished children are found in a Tokyo apartment nine months after their mother had left to travel with her boyfriend, during which time a fifth child was discovered to have been murdered by two friends of the oldest child.
1988–1989	Tsutomu Miyazaki	4	Tokyo and Saitama prefecture	Serial killer Tsutomu Miyazaki abducts and murders girls aged four to seven.
1988–1989	Murder of Junko Furuta	1	Tokyo	A 17-year-old boy, Hiroshi Miyano, and three other boys abduct a high school girl, Junko Furuta. They rape and assault her for 40 days. They murder her and encase her body in concrete.
1989	Sakamoto family murder	3	Yokohama	Tsutsumi Sakamoto, a lawyer working on a lawsuit against Aum Shinrikyo doomsday cult disappears with his wife and child. In 1995 it was revealed that cult members had murdered them and buried their bodies.
1990	Sapporo murder	1	Sapporo	Nagata Ryoji murders a robbery victim during a break-in at a Sapporo residence. Ryoji is subsequently added to the Japanese Ten Most Wanted Fugitives list.
1990	Gangland slaying of police officers	7	Okinawa	Hideo Zamami and Takeo Matayoshi, members of the Kyokuryu-kai affiliated Nishiki family, gun down two plainclothes Okinawa police officers mistaking them for rival gangsters. Sentenced to life imprisonment, Zamami later appealed the decision claiming he was innocent of the shooting and used a scapegoat. Although rejecting his appeal, the court denied the prosecution's request for the death penalty. Matayoshi is still at large. A total of seven people, including the two police officers and a high school boy, are killed during the battle.
1994	Matsumoto incident	7	Matsumoto, Nagano	Doomsday cult Aum Shinrikyo release sarin nerve gas in a residential area in the world's first use of chemical weapons by a terrorist group.
1995	Tokyo Sarin Gas Attack	12	Tokyo	Aum Shinrikyo members conduct simultaneous attacks on multiple Tokyo Metro trains using sarin nerve gas, killing 12 and injuring more than 1000.
1995	1995 Okinawa rape incident	-	Okinawa	A 12-year-old Japanese girl was kidnapped, raped and beaten by three U.S Servicemen. This incident caused public outrage to erupt in Japan and led to further debate over the continued presence of U.S. forces in Japan.
1995	Hachiōji supermarket murders	3	Hachiōji, Tokyo	Three employees of a supermarket are found shot dead in a suspected robbery. Despite massive publicity, the case is still unsolved.
1997	Kobe child murders	2	Kobe	Over several months, a 14-year-old boy, alias "Seito Sakakibara", attacks a total of four younger girls with a hammer or a knife, killing one of them. He then strangles and decapitates Jun Hase, an 11-year-old boy, leaving his head in front of his school with a note stuffed in his mouth, and sends taunting letters to a newspaper. The nation is shocked when a 14-year-old is arrested, and eventually prompted the government to lower the age of criminal responsibility from 16 to 14 in 2000.
1997	Murder of Masaru Takumi	2	Kobe	Masaru Takumi, considered to be the heir apparent of Yakuza leader Yoshinori Watanabe's Yamaguchi-gumi organization, is killed by rival Nakano-kai gangsters Kouji Ishihara, Nakaho Kiyohara and Toriyabara Kiyoteru at a popular Kobe hotel. During the attack, dentist Hirai Hiroshi was mistaken as a bodyguard for Takumi and is killed by a four gunman Takeshi Yoshida whose killing of an innocent bystander would eventually lead to the Japanese government's prosecution of the Nakano-kai.
1998	Wakayama curry-poisoning incident	4	Wakayama	Four people are killed and 63 injured after eating curry laced with arsenic at a community festival in Wakayama. Masumi Hayashi, the chief suspect, has been sentenced to death and is currently appealing.
1999	Okegawa stalking murder	1	Okegawa, Saitama	A stalker, Kazuhito Komatsu, murders 21-year-old Shiori Ino with accomplices. The Police ignores her appeal before the murder and slanders her after the murder. The perpetrators were only arrested after journalist Kiyoshi Shimizu's investigation. Komatsu escapes and kills himself in Hokkaido.
1999	Shimonoseki Station massacre	5	Shimonoseki, Yamaguchi Prefecture	Yasuaki Uwabe, a former architect, drove a rented car into Shimonoseki Station and hit at least 7 people, two of whom died before the car got stuck. He then proceeded to stab pedestrians at random with a kitchen knife, injuring 4 and killing a further 3. Uwabe was eventually apprehended by a station worker and was arrested shortly after. Uwabe was executed in 2012.
2000	Niigata girl confinement incident	-	Tokyo	While investigating a domestic disturbance call, police discover a schoolgirl who had been kidnapped in 1990 and held prisoner in an upstairs apartment for over nine years by a mentally disturbed man, Nobuyuki Sato. The girl, Fusako Sano, was returned to her parents while Sato was hospitalized and eventually sentenced to 14 years imprisonment.
2000	Tokyo Bay Sinyo Bay Bank robbery	1	Tokyo	Tominaga Kazuyuki, a career criminal associated with the Yakuza, successfully steals 46,000,000 yen after hijacking a delivery to a pachinko parlor in December 2000. During the robbery, the driver was gunned down by Kazuyuki and an unidentified Chinese accomplice.
2000	Hostess murders	2	Roppongi, Tokyo	Joji Obara, a prominent Osaka businessman, murders and dismembers British hostess Lucie Blackman. After the discovery of her body a year later, he was charged with her murder as well as similar charges against Australian hostess Carita Ridgeway and sexual assault charges against six other women. He was found not guilty of murdering Lucie Blackman due to lack of evidence, but was convicted of the other crimes. Obara was convicted of Blackman's murder following an appeal trial in 2008.
2000	Setagaya family murder	4	Setagaya, Tokyo	In an incident which shocked the nation, a family of four are murdered at their home in suburban Tokyo by an unknown intruder. Despite extensive investigations and a huge media coverage, the case remains unsolved.
2001	Hokuryo Clinic Incident	10?	Sendai, Miyagi	An 89-year-old woman dies mysteriously in Koryo Clinic. Nurse Daisuke Mori is suspected of at least 10 murders. He is arrested for a murder, but he insists that their death are caused by medical errors.
2001	Ikeda school massacre	8	Osaka	37-year-old former janitor Mamoru Takuma entered an elementary school in Osaka, then used a kitchen knife to kill 8 students. He wounded an additional 13 other students and 2 teachers. He was executed in 2004.
2001	Myojo 56 building fire	44	Tokyo	A building caught fire in Kabukichō. Three employees can escape by jumping from the third floor of the building, but 44 people are killed by carbon monoxide in the building. The cause is strongly suspected as arson. However security is poor in Kabukicho and customers use false names. The case is still unsolved.
2002	Kitakyushu serial murders	7	Kitakyūshū	Futoshi Matsunaga forces the victims to kill each other, resulting in killing 7 people between 1996 and 1998. Matsunaga and his common-law wife Junko Ogata are arrested in 2002 after a girl escapes from them.
2003	Super Free rape incident	-	Tokyo	Students of Japanese universities in Tokyo rape women in a circle Super Free. Organizer Shinichiro Wada and 13 other members are arrested for gang rapes. The estimated number of rape victims are up to 500.
2003	Fukuoka family murder case	4	Fukuoka	Businessman Shinjiro Matsumoto, his wife Chika and two children aged 11 and 8 are murdered in a robbery by three Chinese students who broke into their home and dumped their bodies in Hakata Bay. Two of the three - Yang Ning and Wang Liang – fled to China where they were arrested. Yang was executed and Wang sentenced to life imprisonment. The third, Wei Wei, was arrested in Japan and was held on death row until finally executed in December 2019.
2004	Sasebo slashing	1	Sasebo, Nagasaki	Satomi Mitarai, a 12-year-old elementary student, is stabbed to death by her classmate at school. The classmate has not been identified for legal reasons.
2004	Ōmuta murders	4	Ōmuta, Fukuoka	Mob wife Mami Kitamura murders four people with her husband and two sons. The four perpetrators are sentenced to death.
2004	Murder of Kaede Ariyama	1	Nara	Kaede Ariyama, a 7-year-old school girl, is kidnapped and murdered by a local newspaper deliveryman, Kaoru Kobayashi. Following his arrest, he was convicted and sentenced to the death penalty.
2005	Web suicide site murders	3	Osaka	Serial killer Hiroshi Maeue murders three people. They are lured by Maeue via the online suicide club. He has been executed.
2005	Murder of Airi Kinoshita	1	Hiroshima, Japan	7-year-old Airi Kinoshita is abducted on her way home from school and killed by wanted Peruvian sex offender Jose Manuel Torres Yake. He was sentenced to life.
2006	Five dead bodies in Hiratsuka	5	Hiratsuka, Kanagawa	Five dead bodies are found in Hiratsuka. A woman, Chizuko Okamoto, is arrested for a murder of her daughter, but the case is hardly solved due to lack of evidence and statute of limitations.
2006	Murder of Azumi Muto	1	Shibuya, Tokyo	An aspiring actress who was murdered by her 21-year-old brother Yuki Muto.
2007	Murder of Lindsay Hawker	1	Ichikawa, Chiba	A 22-year-old British teacher who was killed in Japan in early 2007 by Tatsuya Ichihashi. He was sentenced to life imprisonment on 21 July 2011.
2007	Iccho Itoh Murder	1	Nagasaki	The mayor of Nagasaki, Iccho Itoh, is shot to death by Tetsuya Shiroo. Shiroo is a member of the Yamaguchi-gumi crime syndicate and was angry over damage to his car that occurred at a city construction site four years earlier.
2007	Nagakute hostage incident	1	Nagakute, Aichi	A former yakuza shot a responding police officer and his two kids before taking his ex-wife hostage after a family dispute, resulting in a 29 hour long stand-off with another officer being killed during the recovery mission of the first police officer.
2007	Murder of Hiroshi Miyamoto	7	Saga and Fukuoka	Gangs, who belong to Dojin-kai, dispute about its leader. Kyushu Seido-kai separates from Dojin-kai and they kill each other. They kill six gang members and a civilian, Hiroshi Miyamoto.
2008	Akihabara massacre	7	Akihabara, Tokyo	25-year-old Tomohiro Kato rammed a truck into a crowd of shoppers and proceeded to stab the run-down victims, killing six men and one woman and injuring 11 others. Kato was sentenced to death on 24 March 2011, and was hanged on 26 July 2022.
2008	Osaka movie theatre fire	16	Naniwa, Osaka	Kazuhiro Ogawa set a pornographic video theater on fire in an attempt to kill himself, but became scared and ran away without putting out the fire, leading to the death of 16 people.
2009	Konohana pachinko arson case	5	Konohana, Osaka	Sunao Takami set a pachinko parlor on fire on 5 July 2009; resulting in 5 people being killed, injured other 10. Takami was given the death sentence in 2016, and was hanged on 21 August 2026.
2011	Amagasaki Serial Murder Incident	8 -	Hyogo, Kochi, Kagawa, Okayama, Shiga, Kyoto	Miyoko Sumida and her family forces the victims to kill each other, resulting in killing at least 8 people between the 1990s - 2000s. The Sumida family was arrested in 2011, while Miyoko committed suicide in 2012. The investigation is ongoing.
2013	Etajima stabbings	2	Etajima, Hiroshima	Chen Shuangxi, a Chinese exchange student and intern attacked his co-workers at a fish processing plant in Etajima, Hiroshima with a knife and shovel, killing 2 people and injuring 6 others.
2014	Sasebo schoolgirl murder	1	Sasebo, Nagasaki	15-year-old Aiwa Matsuo was killed by her friend.
2016	Murder of Rina Shimabukuro	1	Naha, Okinawa	20-year-old Rina Shimabukuro, is raped and murdered by Kenneth Franklin Gadson, a former Marine and civilian contractor who worked at Kadena Air Base. This case prompted renewed protests against the U.S. military presence in Okinawa. Gadson is sentenced to life in prison.
2016	Sagamihara stabbings	19	Sagamihara, Kanagawa	A former employee went on a stabbing spree at a facility for people with disabilities in Sagamihara, killing at least 19 people and injuring up to 50 others.
2016	Murder of Jiang Ge	1	Nakano, Tokyo	24-year-old Chinese student Jiang Ge, is murdered by Chen Shifeng, a Chinese student. The case became controversial in China especially in the actions of Jiang's roommate during her murder. Chen is sentenced to 20 years in prison.
2017	Zama Suicide Pact Slayings	9	Zama, Kanagawa	8 young women including 3 high school girls under 18 and a 20-year-old man, were found dead in the apartment of a sex trade scout.
2017	Murder of Le Thi Nhat Linh	1	Matsudo, Chiba	Shibuya abducted Linh with his vehicle while she was on her way to school on March 24, 2017, then went on to sexually assault and strangle her before abandoning her body near a drainage ditch in the city of Abiko two days later.
2019	Kawasaki stabbings	3	Kawasaki, Kanagawa	A group of schoolchildren waiting for a bus were attacked by a knife-wielding man. A 12-year-old girl and a 39-year-old man died. The suspect reportedly took his own life by stabbing himself in the neck.
2019	Kyoto Animation arson attack	36	Uji, Kyoto	A man walked into Kyoto Animation's studio, sprayed an "unidentified flammable liquid" around the building, and onto people, before lighting it on fire.
2021	October 2021 Tokyo attack	-	Chōfu	On 31 October 2021, a man carried out a knife and arson attack on a Tokyo subway train as it was traveling to Kokuryō Station on the Keiō Line in Chōfu
2021	2021 Osaka building fire	27	Kitashinchi, Kita, Osaka	A man walked in to a psychiatric clinic in Kitashinchi, Osaka, and started a fire by kicking a bag filled with gasoline that he placed next to a heater, causing the entire clinic to be engulfed in smoke and killing 27 people, including the man.
2022	Assassination of Shinzo Abe	1	Nara, Nara Prefecture	Former Prime Minister of Japan Shinzo Abe is assassinated while giving a speech in Nara, Nara Prefecture. The suspect, ex-JMSDF member Tetsuya Yamagami, was apprehended on the scene and prosecuted shortly after.
2023	2023 Nagano attack	4	Nakano, Nagano	On 25 May 2023, a man killed four people in a shooting and stabbing attack in Nakano, Nagano Prefecture, Japan.
2026	Murder of Moe Harukawa	2	Sunshine City, Ikebukuro, Tokyo	On 26 March 2026, Moe Harukawa, 21, a clerk at Pokemon Center Mega Tokyo in the Sunshine City shopping complex was stabbed in the neck and other parts of her body by a man wielding a knife. The suspect, who also fatally stabbed himself afterwards, is identified as 26-year-old Taiki Hirokawa, who was Harukawa's ex-boyfriend having met while working together part-time in late 2023, and later entered a relationship that ended in July 2025. Hirokawa had previously been arrested after Harukawa reported being stalked by him in late 2025.
