= Inagawa =

Inagawa may refer to:

- 5851 Inagawa (provisional designation: 1991 DM1), a main-belt minor planet
- Inagawa, Hyōgo, town in Kawabe District, Hyōgo, Japan
- Inagawa Circuit, 1.030 km motor racing circuit in Japan
- Inagawa Dam, dam in Nagano Prefecture, Japan
- Inagawa-kai, the third largest of Japan's yakuza gangs
- So Inagawa, Japanese DJ and producer

== People with the surname ==
- Kakuji Inagawa, founder of the Inagawa-kai
- Toi Inagawa, son of Kakuji Inagawa and Godfather of the Inagawa-kai
- Yutaka Inagawa, Japanese artist
- Manaka Inagawa, a women's professional shogi player
- Mana Inagawa, a fictional character in Valkyrie Drive- Bhikkhuni
