= 2010 in organized crime =

In 2010, a number of events took place in organized crime. On the first day of the year, reporter Jose Luis Romero was kidnapped for reporting on the Mexican Mafia. While investigating the kidnapping, policeman Jesus Escalante was killed. The Mexican Drug War is an armed conflict taking place between rival drug cartels and government forces in Mexico. Mexican drug cartels, or drug trafficking organizations, have become more powerful since the demise of Colombia's Cali and Medellín cartels in the 1990s. Mexican drug cartels now dominate the illicit drug market in the United States. Arrests of key cartel leaders, particularly in the Tijuana and Gulf cartels, have led to increasing drug violence as cartels fight for control of the trafficking routes into the United States.

== Events ==
=== January ===
- 1 January – Jose Luis Romero, a crime reporter for the Linea Directa radio station, is kidnapped in Los Mochis, a city in the Mexican state of Sinaloa, due to his reporting on Mexico's drug production and trafficking. Jesus Escalante, the chief of investigations for the Sinaloa state police, started an investigation later that day, and was killed by gunmen a few hours later.
- 2 January – Indian Police Service Assistant Commissioner of Police Prakash Wani, along with four other police officers, were suspended after a video circulated showing them dancing with underworld members at a Christmas Eve party hosted by India crime boss Chotta Rajan in Mumbai's Chembur suburb.
- 2 January – A funeral was held for Nick Rizzuto Jr., who was shot to death on 18 December 2009. His father, reputed Montreal mob boss Vito Rizzuto, was not permitted to attend because he was serving a prison sentence in the United States. Police videographers filmed every guest at the funeral.
- 3 January – A homemade bomb exploded at the entrance to a court in the southern Italian city of Reggio Calabria. Nobody was injured. Authorities say the 'Ndrangheta launched the attack, targeting the prosecutor's office due to its work confiscating mafia assets and ongoing appeals in cases against organized crime.
- 3 January – Carlos Beltrán Leyva, a drug lord with the Mexican Beltrán-Leyva Cartel, was arraigned following his 30 December arrest in Culiacán, after he was stopped while driving with a forged license. The arrest came two weeks after Leyva's brother, cartel leader Arturo Beltrán Leyva, was killed in a gun battle with police.
- 4 January – A Weng'an court sentenced 18 people to up to 20-year prison terms for their involvement in organized crimes in China's Guizhou province. Twelve of the arrested were members of the Yushan Gang, who were convicted of organizing racketeering, illegal mining, operating gambling dens, intentional injuring, rape and other offenses.
- 4 January – A total of 29 people were killed in 13 separate drug-related attacks over a 24-hour span in Chihuahua, including two state police officers who were shot by six attackers. Among the slain were a female activist who led protests against alleged rights abuses by police and military deployed to fight organized crime.
- 4 January – Seven Tijuana policemen were detained for alleged ties to organized crime. The arrests stemmed from the interrogation of Luis Gilberto "El Gil" Sanchez Guerrero, an ex-officer arrested 29 December 2008, who allegedly led more than 10 kidnap and murder crews for Tijuana Cartel lieutenant Teodoro García Simental.
- 5 January – Boris "Bobi" Tsankov, a Bulgarian radio presenter and crime writer who wrote about local mafia affairs in a book published in November, was shot to death outside a fast food restaurant. Top Bulgaria crime bosses Krasimir Marinov and Stefan Bonev were arrested later that day.
- 5 January – Andrew Merola, the reputed leader of a North New Jersey faction of the Gambino crime family, pleaded guilty to conspiracy charges. Merola admitted he headed an organization involved in gambling, loan-sharking, scams and labor racketeering during a Newark hearing. He faced up to 20 years in prison.
- 5 January – Italian police arrest 14 alleged members of Camorra clans fighting to seize control of drug trafficking and extortion rackets in some of Naples's northern suburbs.
- 6 January – Piero Grasso, Italy's top anti-mafia prosecutor, announces a new "Mafia campaign" in response to the bombing of a Reggio Calabria courthouse by 'Ndrangheta on 3 January. Grasso called for the strengthening of national investigation procedures to arrest criminals and seize their assets.
- 6 January – Convicted racketeer Mark Strodtman is sentenced to 31 years in prison in Greeley, Colorado, for his role in a mortgage fraud scheme. Strodtman was the first man convicted in Weld County under the state's organized crime statute.
- 6 January – Bing Yi Chen, the lieutenant of a Chinese crime organization, was sentenced to 35 years in prison for helping arrange the July 1994 murder of two Toronto men as a favor for a Hong Kong drug lord. Chen, also known as "Ah Ngai", was convicted on 23 October 2007.
- 7 January – Three Chinese mob leaders and four criminal gang members were executed in Shijiazhuang through lethal injection. The executions were the result of convictions for murder, gun sales, gambling and other crimes that were considered among the worst in Hebei province in six decades.
- 8 January – Li Zhuang, a Chinese lawyer for suspected mafia boss Gong Gangmo, was sentenced to 30 months in prison for falsifying evidence and jeopardizing testimony in Gangmo's trial. State media previously said Gangmo's trial underscored major flaws in China's judicial system.
- 8 January – Pradeep Sharma, Mumbai's former police shootout specialist, and several other police officers, were arrested for allegedly staging the death of Vashi gangster Ramnarayan Gupta. Authorities say Gupta was kidnapped and brought to a Versova park, where Sharma shot him to death.
- 8 January – Kenneth Dunn, a disbarred South Florida lawyer, was sentenced to 43 months in prison for laundering money and committing other crimes for a local mafia crew affiliated with the Bonanno crime family in New York City.
- 9 January – The dead bodies of Yulian "Kunfuto" Lefterov, a former member of the Bulgarian mafia group SIC, and Ivaylo "Yozhi" Evtimov, leader of "The Impudent" gang, are found in the Plana Mountain in western Bulgaria.
- 9 January – A planned extradition to Italy of Marisa Merico, daughter of Calabrian godfather Emilio di Giovine and wife of henchman Bruno Merico, was delayed when she receives death threats.
- 11 January – Nicolo Romeo, a 72-year-old owner of an animal feed business, was shot to death outside the Italian town Corleone, allegedly because he refused to pay a pizzo to local Sicilian Mafia bosses.
- 12 January – Seventeen men with suspected ties to the 'Ndrangheta are arrested around Italy, including in Rosarno and Bologna. Some were arrested for their alleged roles in violent clashes with immigrant workers, whereas others were already in prison on different charges. Among those arrested were suspected members of Pesce-Bellocco clan, one of the most powerful 'Ndrangheta clans, who were suspected of taking orders from clan ringleader Carmello Bellocco, serving a prison term for racketeering.
- 12 January – Alleged Chinese gang boss Yue Ning and 30 accomplices faced trial for a prostitution business inside Chongqing. Ning also faces charges of firearms possession and bribery, among other crimes.
- 13 January – Alleged mobster Nikolai Marinov, also known as "The Little Margin Brother", was officially declared a wanted man after he failed ito appear in court on charges of conspiring to murder three people. His brother, Krasimir Marinov, was previously arrested for the murder of Boris Tsankov and his younger brother Nikolai Marinov has been missing ever since.
- 14 January – Anggodo Widjoj, a Chinese businessman, was arrested on suspicion of bribing two deputies with Indonesia's anti-mafia Corruption Eradication Commission. The commission announced $2.2 trillion had been lost from embezzlement within the organization.
- 14 January – United States federal prosecutors announced they would not retry alleged mafia don John A. Gotti on racketeering charges. Gotti had been free on $2 million bail since 1 December 2009, when a jury deadlocked during a fourth trial against him.
- 27 January – Paolo Di Mauro of the Camorra, wanted since 2003 and on the list of most wanted fugitives in Italy, was arrested in Barcelona.

=== May ===
- 20 May – Paolo Renda disappeared.

=== November ===
- 10 November – Nicolo Rizzuto was killed at his residence in the Cartierville borough of Montreal when a single bullet from a sniper's rifle punched through double-paned glass of the rear patio doors of his mansion
- 18 November – Kiyoshi Takayama, the head of the Kodo-kai and the "de facto leader" of the Yamaguchi-gumi, the largest yakuza syndicate in Japan, was arrested.

=== December ===
- 1 December – Tadashi Irie, the head of the Takumi-gumi and the number three leader of the Yamaguchi-gumi, the largest yakuza syndicate in Japan, was arrested.

== Arts and literature ==
- January – Gomorrah (2008) is released on Blu-ray through The Criterion Collection

== See also ==
- Timeline of the Mexican drug war
- Timeline of organized crime

== Bibliography ==
=== References ===
- Kelly, Robert J.; Schatzberg, Rufus; Chin, Ko-lin (1994). Handbook of organized crime in the United States (1994 ed.). Greenwood Publishing Group. ISBN 0-313-28366-4.
- Vilalta, C. (2011). "Monthly patterns, trends, and trajectories in the count of deaths related to organized crime, 2006-2010" (PDF). Conference at UAEM (in Spanish), 26 April 2011. Archived from the original (PDF) on 17 August 2011.
