= Tadashi Irie =

Japanese mafia

- 入江 禎
- Born: December 9, 1944 (age 81); Uwajima, Ehime
- Occupation: Yakuza
- Organization(s): Takumi-gumi; Yamaguchi-gumi

Tadashi Irie (入江 禎, Irie Tadashi; born December 9, 1944 in Uwajima, Ehime) is a yakuza, the head (kumicho) of the Osaka-based 2nd Takumi-gumi and the grand general manager (so-honbucho) of the 6th Yamaguchi-gumi. He is regarded as the number-three leader of the 6th Yamaguchi-gumi, the largest known yakuza syndicate.

== Career ==
Irie began his career as a yakuza when he joined the Fukui-gumi, a Yamaguchi affiliate based in Osaka. He later joined the Takumi-gumi in 1978 when Masaru Takumi, then the number-two member (wakagashira) of the Fukui-gumi, became an executive underboss (jikisan) of the 3rd Yamaguchi-gumi. Prior to this he was the head of his own clan, the Irie-gumi, which he formed in 1975, but following this he merged it into the Takumi-gumi.

He was known for his unwavering loyalty to Masaru Takumi; he had been offered the Yamaguchi-gumi's executive position several times, but he repeatedly declined, preferring to be Takumi's henchman. In 1997 when Takumi was assassinated by the Nakano-kai, he succeeded as the head of the Takumi-gumi, retaliating ruthlessly against the Nakano-kai.

He entered the Kobe headquarters of the Yamaguchi-gumi in 1997 when he became the head of the Takumi-gumi. He was promoted to wakagashira-hosa (one of the number-three underbosses) in 2005, and following the start of the sixth era headed by Shinobu Tsukasa from the Kodo-kai of Nagoya, he attained the de facto number-three position (so-honbucho).

He has been involved in the Yamaguchi-gumi's important yakuza wars such as the Osaka War (1975–1978, against the Matsuda-gumi) and Yama-Ichi War (1984–1989, against the Ichiwa-kai).

On December 1, 2010 — just 2 weeks after the arrest of the "number-two of the Yamaguchi-gumi" Kiyoshi Takayama —, Irie, as the "number-three of the Yamaguchi-gumi", was arrested on suspicion of compensating the relatives of a hitman (a member of the Takumi-gumi) who had been jailed for murdering a senior member of the Nakano-kai. He was charged with paying 3.9 million yen ($46,555) to the hitman's relatives, whom he had paid a total of at least approximately US$250,000. He was released on bail on December 24 of that year, and received a jail sentence of 10 months in March 2011.

== After moving to Kobe Yamaguchi-gumi ==
On August 27, 2015, he left the sixth-generation Yamaguchi-gumi and formed a new organization, the Kobe Yamaguchi-gumi, with more than a dozen members, including Kunio Inoue (assistant to the sixth-generation Yamaguchi-gumi Wakatou and fourth-generation Yama-kengumi) and Osamu Teraoka (the younger brother of the Yamaguchi-gumi and president of the Toyukai). Irie becomes the vice-president. On the same date, he was insulated from the sixth generation Yamaguchi-gumi.

Preceded by Masaru Takumi	Kumicho of Takumi-gumi; 1997-present	Succeeded by (none)
