= Susumu Ishii =

Japanese yakuza leader (1924–1991)

Susumu Ishii (Japanese: 石井 進; 1924–1991) was the second kaicho (godfather) of the Inagawa-kai yakuza gang in Japan. He was also fifth socho of the Yokosuka-ikka.

Ishii was born in Yokosuka in 1924. As a child, he moved with his family to Kamakura where they ran a small noodle shop. In World War II, he was assigned to a kaiten unit of the Japanese Navy but was not given the chance to take part in a suicide attack. After the war, he became a yakuza and joined the Inagawa-kai in 1958. He rose to the number two position in that gang, but was imprisoned for a gambling scam from 1978 to 1984. After serving his time in prison Ishii spoke to the media, saying; "We cannot succeed in the yakuza world unless we are active and aggressive until our early forties. After that, we have to adapt our lives to ordinary society. We cannot always be so forceful."

His house remains in Yokosuka city, a three-storey, brick house in French, Greek and Italian styles.

Ishii owned the Iwama Country Club, with a 36 holes, luxurious golf course. Ishii gathered the wealthiest of Japan and asked them to buy memberships, at a cost of over 200,000 USD. The golf course was a success, bringing millions to Ishii.

He was released from prison at the start of Japan's bubble economy in 1984. Through various loans, banking deals, and real estate scams, he accumulated assets of over $4 billion which he invested in projects around the world, including in Korea and the United States. In 1989, his group even hired Prescott Bush Jr., the brother of President George H. W. Bush, as an advisor (Bush denied knowing his clients' criminal background).

The Yomiuri Shimbun newspaper stated, "Almost every money transaction was related to Susumu Ishii in the 80s and 90s." Ishii's money went overseas as well. He invested in hotels in Monaco, Hong Kong and America. In total he invested 700 million dollars around the world. Throughout various investments he was able to have successful international relations and grow his money.

Ishii was known as the "World's Richest Gangster" or "The Gangster With the Golden Touch".

== Stock market manipulations ==
Under Ishii's leadership, the two largest Japanese investment firms, Nomura Securities and Nikko Securities, lent money to the Inagawa-kai; the sales director of Nomura personally administered Ishii's account. Using $200 million in loans, Ishii was able to manipulate the stock market, including buying 27 million shares in the Tokyu Corporation. He made a profit of almost 2 billion dollars from his Tokyu investment. Ishii also received credit and loans totaling to $2.5 billion from Sagawa Kyubin. The president of Nikko Securities and the chairman and president of Nomura resigned when their links to Ishii became public.

== Later life ==
But as the Japanese economic bubble burst, Ishii was no longer "the world's richest gangster". His assets and his health declined rapidly, and in September 1990 he retired as kumicho. He was replaced by Yuko Inagawa, son of the gang's original founder Kakuji Inagawa.

Ishii died on September 3, 1991, at Keio University Hospital at age 67. Over 6,000 people attended his funeral at the Ikegami Honmon-ji temple in Ōta, Tokyo.

Preceded by Seijo Inagawa	Kaicho of Inagawa-kai; 1985-1990	Succeeded by Yuko Inagawa
