= Kakuji =

- Gender: Male

Origin
- Origin: Japanese
- Meaning: Different meanings depending on the kanji used

Kakuji (written: 角二 or 覚治) is a masculine Japanese given name. Notable people with the name include:

- Kakuji Inagawa (稲川 角二) (1914–2007), Japanese yakuza member
- Kakuji Kakuta (角田 覚治) (1890–1944), Imperial Japanese Navy admiral
