= Aizukotetsu-kai =

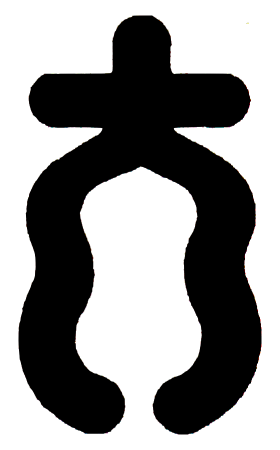
- The daimon of Aizukotetsu-kai
- Founded: 1868; 158 years ago
- Founder: Senkichi Kousaka
- Founding location: Kyoto, Japan
- Membership: 40
- Leader: Kensei Takayama
- Allies: Yamaguchi-gumi

The Aizukotetsu-kai (会津小鉄会, Aizukotetsu-kai) (sometimes written Aizu-Kotetsukai or Aizu Kotetsu-kai) is a yakuza organization in Japan based in Kyoto. Its name comes from the Aizu region, "Kotetsu", a type of Japanese sword, and the suffix "-kai", or society.

In 1992 the Aizukotetsu-kai became one of the first yakuza syndicates named under Japan's new anti-boryokudan legislation, which gave police expanded powers to crack down on yakuza. Its chairman at the time, Tokutaro Takayama, campaigned publicly against the new laws, and the group launched a lawsuit challenging their constitutionality. In September 1995 the Kyoto District Court threw out the lawsuit. At its peak in 1993 the group had 1,600 active members.

In October 2005, the group allied with the Sixth Yamaguchi-gumi, Japan's largest yakuza clan now led by Kenichi Shinoda (Oyabun) and his second-in-command (Wakagashira) Kiyoshi Takayama.
