= Kaneyoshi =

- Gender: Male

Origin
- Origin: Japanese
- Meaning: Different meanings depending on the kanji used

Kaneyoshi (written: 兼良, 兼吉, 銀芳, 金義 or かねよし in hiragana) is a masculine Japanese given name. Notable people with the name include:

- Ichijō Kaneyoshi (一条 兼良) (1402–1481), Japanese kugyō
- Kaneyoshi Izumi (和泉 かねよし), Japanese manga artist
- Kaneyoshi Kuwata (桑田 兼吉) (1939–2007), Japanese yakuza member
- Kaneyoshi Muto (武藤 金義) (1916–1945), Japanese World War II flying ace
- Kaneyoshi Tabuchi (田渕 銀芳) (1917–1997), Japanese photographer
- Prince Kaneyoshi
