= Harukichi =

- Gender: Male

Origin
- Origin: Japanese
- Meaning: Different meanings depending on the kanji used

Harukichi (written: 春吉 or 晴吉) is a masculine Japanese given name. Notable people with the name include:

- Harukichi Hyakutake (百武 晴吉; 1888–1947), Japanese general
- Harukichi Shimoi (下位 春吉; 1883–1954), Japanese poet and writer
- Harukichi Yamaguchi (山口 春吉; 1881–1938), Japanese mob boss
