= Bobi Tsankov =

Boris "Bobi" Tsankov
- Born: 12 August 1979; Sofia, Bulgaria
- Died: 5 January 2010 (aged 30); Sofia, Bulgaria
- Occupations: Journalist, crime writer and radio personality

Bobi Tsankov (Bulgarian: Боби Цанков; 12 August 1979 – 5 January 2010) was a Bulgarian journalist, crime writer and radio personality, who was killed in Sofia for unclear reasons.

== Biography ==
Boris "Bobi" Tsankov was born in Sofia on 12 August 1979. A controversial figure, in 2003 he was arrested and in 2006 he was convicted for fraud. He has been a host for Viva Radio. In September 2009 he started publishing a series on article on the tabloid Weekend about local crime figures. On TV he claimed to be close to some of underworld bosses of Bulgaria.

In November 2009 he published Secrets of the Mobsters, described as an autobiographical thriller, while according to the police it was a mix of fact and fiction.

== Murder of Tsankov ==
In 2004 a bomb exploded in front of Tsankov's home. On 5 January 2010, he was shot dead in central Sofia in broad daylight by two gunmen. He was 30 years old. Two other men were wounded: they were his bodyguards according to Dnevnik while according to the police they were clients of the same law firm that Tsankov had previously visited.

Director-General of UNESCO Irina Bokova and Nina Ognianova of the Committee to Protect Journalists condemned the killing. Mark Gray, a spokesperson for the European Commission, and EurActiv noted that shootings were a serious problem in Bulgaria.

Krasimir Marinov, a suspected crime boss, was arrested and charged with incitement to murder, but was later freed. Authorities were seeking also his brother Nikolai Marinov. Stefan Bonev was also detained. The motives of his murder remain unclear: it has been argued that it could have been related to his writings or to his frauds.

== See also ==
- List of journalists killed in Europe
- List of Bulgarian journalists
- Bulgarian mafia
- 2010 in organized crime
