= Noboru Yamaguchi (yakuza) =

Japanese mob boss

- Born: 1902; Nada-ku, Kobe, Japan
- Died: October 4, 1942 (aged 39–40)

Noboru Yamaguchi (山口 登, Yamaguchi Noboru; Japanese: [jamaɡɯt͡ɕi noboɾɯ]) was the second kumicho, or Godfather, of the Yamaguchi-gumi yakuza gang in Japan.

He assumed control of the gang in 1925 from his father, the gang's founder, Harukichi Yamaguchi. He ruled until 1942, and was succeeded in 1946 by his protégé, Kazuo Taoka.

Preceded by Harukichi Yamaguchi	Kumicho of Yamaguchi-gumi; 1925-1942	Succeeded by Kazuo Taoka
