= Tomihisa Taue =

Japanese politician and mayor

- 田上 富久
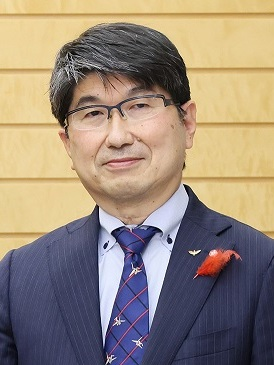
- Tomihisa Taue in November 2021

Mayor of Nagasaki
- In office April 22, 2007 – April 25, 2023
- Preceded by: Iccho Itoh
- Succeeded by: Shiro Suzuki

Personal details
- Born: December 10, 1956 (age 69) Gotō, Nagasaki, Japan
- Education: Kyushu University

Tomihisa Taue (田上 富久, Taue Tomihisa; born December 10, 1956) is a Japanese politician and who served as the mayor of Nagasaki, the capital city of Nagasaki Prefecture, Japan from 2007 to 2023.

== Early life ==
Taue is a graduate of Kyushu University, and majored in jurisprudence.

He began his career as a civil servant at the municipal government, which he first joined in 1980, eventually serving as a department manager of the statistics department.

== Political career ==
Taue was elected mayor of Nagasaki in a special election in 2007 following the assassination of Iccho Itoh in the midst of the 2007 unified local elections. He was re-elected in the April 2011 elections and ran unopposed in the April 2015 elections, the first uncontested mayoral election in Nagasaki history.

In 2007, Taue criticized Fumio Kyuma, then the Minister of Defense, as the mayor of Nagasaki for his remark on the atomic bombings of Hiroshima and Nagasaki in 1945.

He retired at the end of his fourth term in 2023 and succeeded by Shiro Suzuki.

Political offices
Preceded by Iccho Itoh	Mayor of Nagasaki; 2007–2023	Succeeded by Shiro Suzuki
