= Kenichi Yamamoto (yakuza) =

Founder of the Yamaken-gumi gang

- Born: March 5, 1925; Chūō-ku, Kobe, Japan
- Died: February 4, 1982 (aged 56)
- Occupation: Yakuza
- Known for: Founder of the Yamaken-gumi; Wakagashira of the Yamaguchi-gumi

Kenichi Yamamoto (山本 健一, Yamamoto Ken'ichi; March 5, 1925 – February 4, 1982) was a Japanese yakuza boss who founded the Yamaken-gumi, the largest and most powerful affiliate gang of the Yamaguchi-gumi, Japan's largest crime syndicate. By the time of his death, Yamamoto had risen to the rank of wakagashira (the number-two boss) and was considered the heir apparent to the Yamaguchi-gumi's third godfather, Kazuo Taoka.

== Biography ==
Yamamoto was the eldest son in his family; his father was an engineer for Kawasaki Heavy Industries. In 1942, he graduated from Osaka Electric School, after which he briefly worked at the Yokosuka Naval Arsenal before being drafted into the Imperial Japanese Army's Tottori Unit in January 1945.

After the war, Yamamoto returned to his hometown of Kobe. He fell in with associates of the Yamaguchi-gumi and was arrested in January 1953 for his role in an attack on the actor Kōji Tsuruta. Shortly after his release, he was involved in an attack on the rival Tanizaki-gumi in September 1954, an act for which he was imprisoned for three years in Kakogawa prison. Upon his release, Yamamoto's violent reputation earned him praise from the Yamaguchi-gumi's leader, Kazuo Taoka, and in 1961 he formed his own gang, the Yamaken-gumi, in Kobe.

Under Yamamoto's leadership, the Yamaken-gumi grew to become the largest subsidiary of the Yamaguchi-gumi. His success and loyalty earned him the position of wakagashira, the second-in-command of the entire syndicate. He was widely viewed as the natural successor to godfather Kazuo Taoka (1913-1981), but he died of liver disease on February 4, 1982, throwing the syndicate's succession plans into chaos. His last position at the Yamaguchi-gumi was as wakagashira.

Preceded by (none)	Kumicho of the Yamaken-gumi; 1961–1982	Succeeded by Yoshinori Watanabe
