= Kodo-kai =

Criminal organization based in Nagoya, Japan

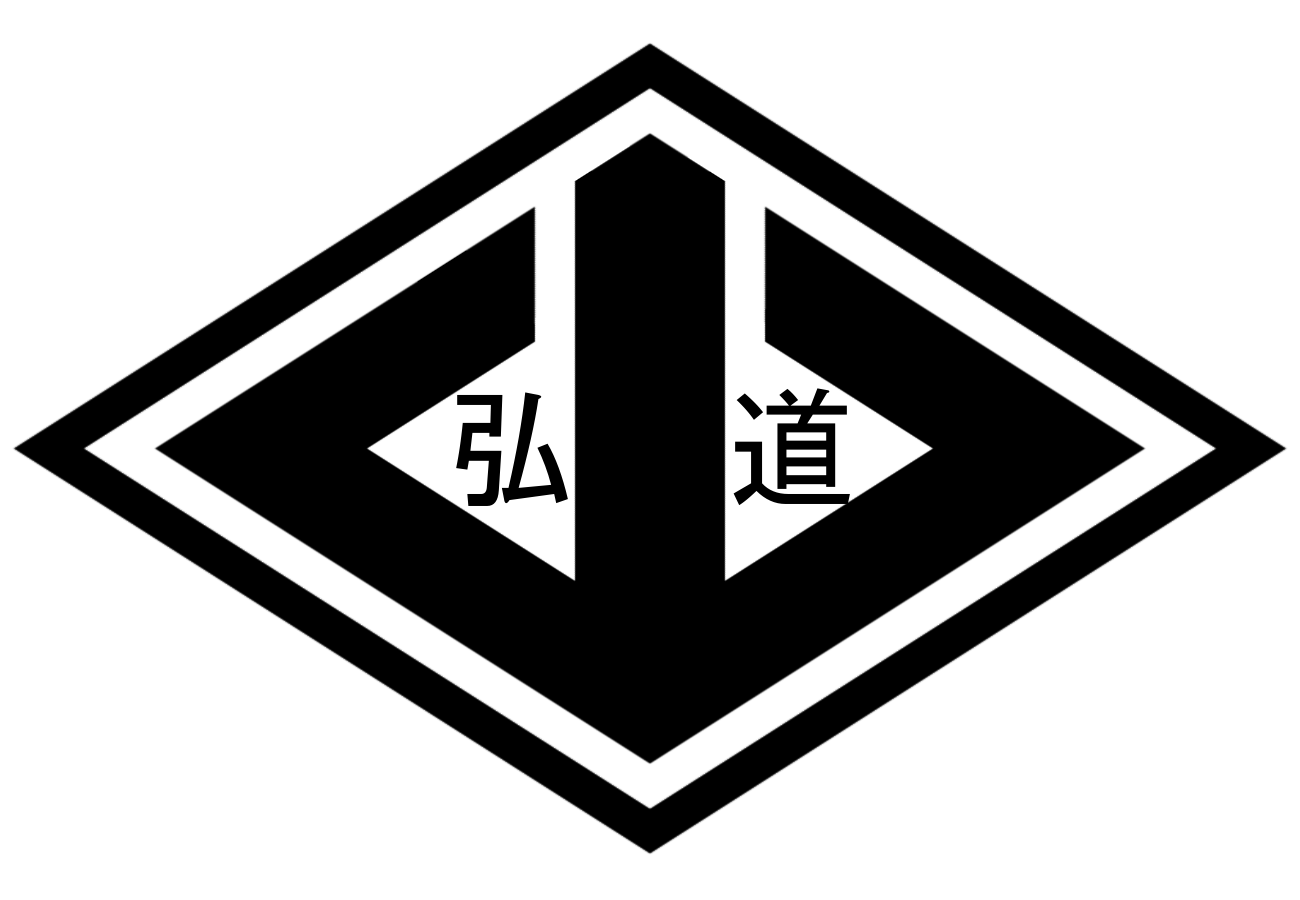
- The daimon of the Kodo-kai
- Founded: 1984
- Founder: Shinobu Tsukasa, 24 other members including Kiyoshi Takayama
- Years active: 1984-present
- Territory: Nagoya, Japan
- Ethnicity: Japanese
- Membership: 4000
- Activities: Banking, investment banking (for the criminal underworld) real estate, securities, show business
- Allies: Seibu Rengo, Komatsu-gumi, Koike-gumi, Fukushima Rengo, Jido-kai, Omi-ikka

The Kodo-kai (弘道会 Kōdō-kai, Koh-doh-kai) is a yakuza criminal organization based in Nagoya, Japan. It is a secondary organization of the Sixth Yamaguchi-gumi, the largest known yakuza syndicate in Japan. With an estimated membership of 4,000, it is the second-largest Yamaguchi affiliate after the Yamaken-gumi, and operates in at least 18 prefectures.

The Kodo-kai is under close surveillance by the National Police Agency, as the NPA considers the organization to not be a traditional yakuza organization, but to be more like a mafia-type organization or terrorist organization. The Kodo-kai is notorious for its defiant attitude toward the official, and has dispensed with the yakuza's traditional policy of co-operating with the police.

The Kodo-kai has been one of the wealthiest clans in the Yamaguchi-gumi, with an immense working capital estimated at around $5 billion.

== History ==
The Kodo-kai was founded in 1984 by Shinobu Tsukasa with 24 other members including Kiyoshi Takayama. At this time, Tsukasa became a formal member of the Fourth Yamaguchi-gumi. When the Fifth Yamaguchi-gumi started in May 1989, Tsukasa assumed the position of wakagashira-hosa (one of the third-ranking bosses).

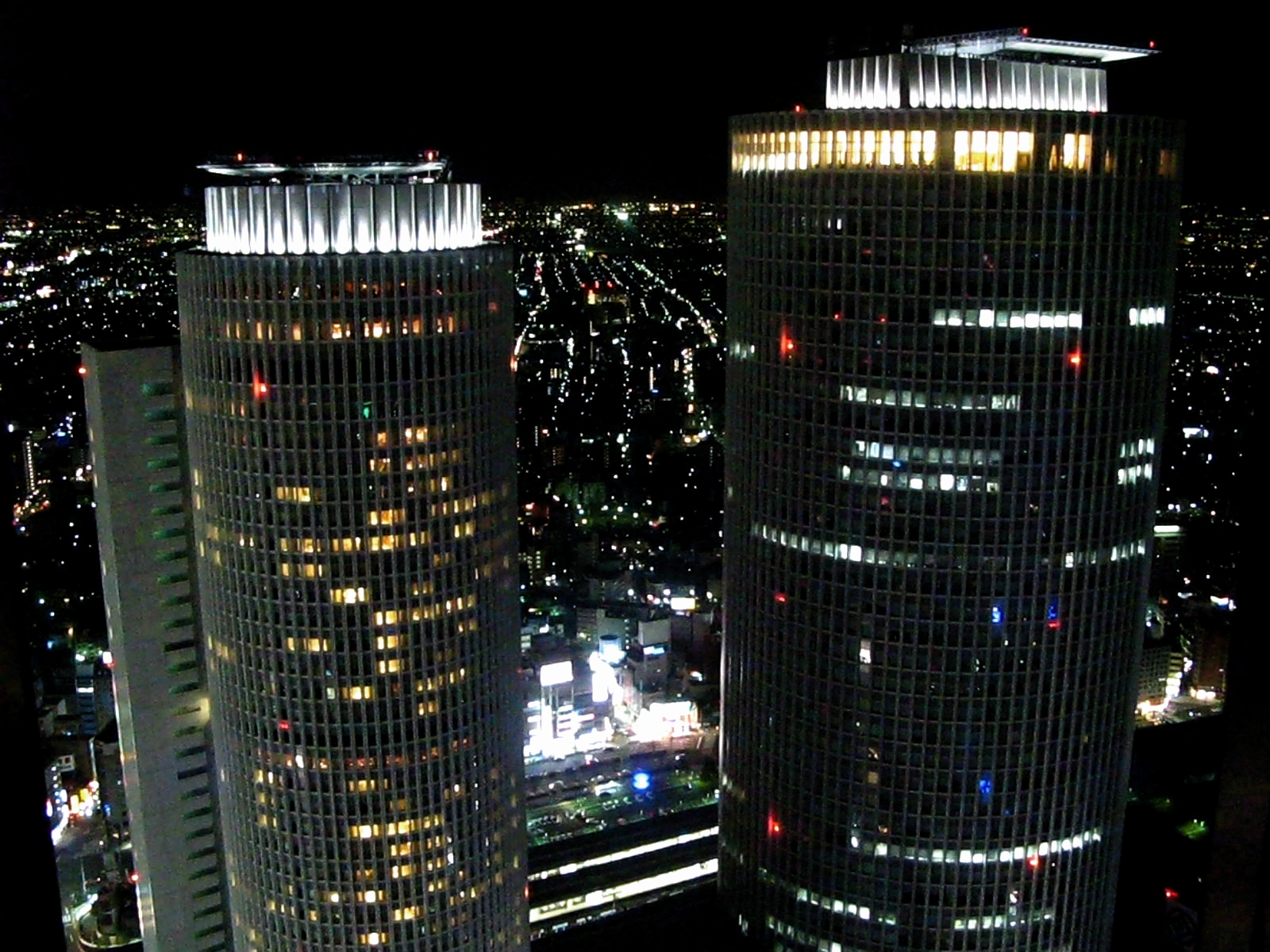
The Kodo-kai's territories include Sakae, the largest downtown in the Nagoya area.

Kiyoshi Takayama was promoted to the number-two boss (wakagashira) in 1989, and to the 2nd president (kaicho) in March 2005. The Kodo-kai expanded under Takayama's administration, and by late 2009 its total membership reached 4,000.

Takayama became a formal member of the Fifth Yamaguchi-gumi in April, 2005, and assumed the position of wakagashira-hosa in June, 2005. And when Tsukasa became the kumicho (Godfather) of the Sixth Yamaguchi-gumi in July 2005, his Kodo-kai partner Takayama was given the position of the wakagashira (number-two boss) on August 8.

== Era ==
=== 1st (1984–2005) ===
Shinobu Tsukasa, also one of the third-ranking bosses (wakagashira-hosa) of the Fifth Yamaguchi-gumi and the founding head of the Tsukasa-kogyo. He would later become the head of the Hirota-gumi and the supreme boss of the Sixth Yamaguchi-gumi.

=== 2nd (2005–) ===
Kiyoshi Takayama who is the number-two boss (wakagashira) of the Sixth Yamaguchi-gumi and the founding head of the Takayama-gumi, and former chief director (rijicho) of the Ryoshin-kai.

== Activities ==
Described as a "financial mafia" by a former officer of the Aichi Prefectural Police Department, the Kodo-kai's activities include banking or investment banking for the criminal underworld. The Kodo-kai is allegedly also very active and powerful in traditional "yakuza-friendly" businesses, such as the real estate business, securities business and show business.

A senior member of another Yamaguchi-affiliate has revealed that the Kodo-kai manages a private intelligence organization which specializes in espionage including police-targeted intelligence.

According to Japanese media sources, the organization is among the most profitable of all the yakuza factions in Japan. Kodo-kai reportedly raked in an immense amount of money by being the sole supplier of rock, sand, and gravel for the Chūbu Centrair International Airport construction project. The organization continues to earn large revenue by controlling the stevedoring and warehousing companies at the Port of Nagoya, and having a monopoly on sex-oriented establishments in the Nagoya area.

== Affiliates ==
The Kodo-kai's known branch organizations have included :

- Seibu Rengo, based in Hakata, Fukuoka, Kyushu.
- Komatsu-gumi, based in Tokyo. Launched around 1987, Komatsu-gumi have its offices in several districts in Tokyo, including Taito and Minato.
- Koike-gumi, based in Chiba.
- Fukushima Rengo, based in Sapporo, Hokkaido.
- Jido-kai, based in Nagano, Nagano, the largest Kodo affiliate in Nagano Prefecture.
- Omi-ikka, based in Otsu, Shiga. The Omi-ikka was founded in 2003 by the eldest son of Tokutaro Takayama, the fourth president of the Kyoto-based Aizukotetsu-kai.

among others.
