= Kantō-kai =

Japanese underworld organization (1964–1965)

The Kantō-kai (関東会) was a Japanese underworld organization formed by Yoshio Kodama in 1964, and named for the Kantō region from which it drew most of its membership. Kodama envisioned the Kantō-kai as a secret national police force, with the aim of forwarding the far right-wing views he and other organized criminals often held.

Kodama had originally envisioned a Japan-wide gangster society, but in 1963 Kazuo Taoka and his Kansai-based Yamaguchi-gumi gang refused to join, leaving Kodama with a Kantō-heavy organization.

The group disbanded in January 1965, after only fifteen months, but was a crucial step in uniting the many post-war gangs into a more coherent entity (the modern yakuza) instead of disparate, warring factions.
