= Kaneyoshi Kuwata =

- Born: September 23, 1939; Osaka, Japan
- Died: April 5, 2007 (aged 67)

Kaneyoshi Kuwata (桑田 兼吉, Kuwata Kaneyoshi, September 23, 1939 – April 5, 2007) was a yakuza gang member, the fifth generation wakagashira of the Yamaguchi-gumi, was the third kumicho of the Yamaken-gumi yakuza gang, and second generation kaicho of Kenryu-kai. He was an Osaka graduate.

In 1969, Kuwata was active in the Yamaguchi-gumi. In 1989, he climbed up to Yoshinori Watanabe's personal secretary, which within a year, he was promoted up to the head assistant.

Kuwata was involved in a December 1997 assassination in Tokyo. Tokyo police found a handgun which had been dropped by one of Kuwata's subordinates after a drive-by shooting. He was charged with weapons possession in 1998, and was sentenced to 7 years in prison by the Tokyo District Court. His appeal was rejected by the Tokyo High Court and then the Japanese Supreme Court in May 2003.

During his time in jail, Kunio Inoue adopted his child in 2004. In 2005, the kumicho status of Yamaken-gumi was transferred to Kunio Inoue when Kuwata sufficiently retired. During his time in Hachiiozi medical prison, Kuwata's liver disease deteriorated vastly and the Tokyo Public Prosecutor's Office ended his prison term on March 15, 2007. Three weeks later, on April 5, 2007, in his home in Osaka, he died at the age of 67.

== Notes and references ==
Translated from the corresponding article in Japanese Wikipedia

Preceded by Yoshinori Watanabe	Kaicho of Kenryu-kai; 1982–1989	Succeeded by Kazuhiro Yamamoto
Preceded by Yoshinori Watanabe	Kumicho of Yamaken-gumi; 1989–2005	Succeeded by Kunio Inoue
