= Kazuo Nakanishi =

Kazuo Nakanishi (中西 一男, Nakanishi Kazuo; October 25, 1922 – September 1, 2003) was briefly the leader of the Yamaguchi-gumi yakuza syndicate in the chaotic years of the Yama–Ichi War. He was also the founder and 1st kumicho of the Nakanishi-gumi.

Nakanishi accepted the temporary leadership position after the assassination of Masahisa Takenaka, but was never considered an official kumicho (supreme Godfather) of the Kobe-based gang, despite heading it from 1985 to 1989. During these years, Yoshinori Watanabe was his underboss.

Following the Yama–Ichi War, Nakanishi ran for the role of fifth kumicho, but lost to Watanabe.

After Watanabe's accession, Nakanishi continued to work for the gang as a senior advisor and leader of 15 sub-gangs in Osaka. He died in September 2003.

| Preceded by (none) | Kumicho of Nakanishi-gumi ?-2003 | Succeeded by Koji Nunokawa |
