= Zama and Shibuya shootings =

1965 mass shootings in Japan

- Location: Zama, Kanagawa and Shibuya, Tokyo in Japan
- Date: July 29, 1965; 11:00–19:18 (UTC+09:00)
- Attack type: Spree shooting, hostage crisis, shootout
- Weapons: Howa Model 300 semi-automatic rifle; Handgun
- Deaths: 1
- Injuries: 17
- Perpetrator: Misao Katagiri

The Zama and Shibuya shootings were the double spree shootings in Japan on July 29, 1965, by Misao Katagiri (片桐 操, Katagiri Misao; April 15, 1947 – July 21, 1972), which left one police officer dead and 17 people injured, at the conclusion of which he was captured by police officers. Katagiri was later executed.

== Timeline ==
Katagiri was born in Setagaya, Tokyo and reportedly loved guns. On July 29, 1965, he shot one policeman dead and injured another with a rifle in Zama, Kanagawa. He stole a handgun and hijacked four cars. In Shibuya, Tokyo, he entered a gun shop near the Shibuya fire station and took four hostages, which resulted in a gun battle with the police. About 5,000 people, including Norio Nagayama, witnessed the gunfight, during which he injured 16 people. One hostage attacked him and police officers eventually captured him. Katagiri was sentenced to death and was executed on July 21, 1972.

== See also ==
- Capital punishment in Japan
- List of major crimes in Japan
