= Suishin-kai =

Japanese yakuza gang based in Nagasaki

The Suishin-kai was a Japanese yakuza gang based in Nagasaki. The gang, affiliated with the Yamaguchi-gumi, Japan's largest yakuza syndicate, came to prominence in April 2007 when its former underboss (then demoted to Captain), Tetsuya Shiroo, shot and killed the mayor of Nagasaki, Iccho Itoh.

The killing is believed to have been the result of a personal grudge on the part of Shiroo, and was not authorized by the Yamaguchi leadership or by Shiroo's colleagues in the Suishin-kai.

After the killing, the Suishin-kai faced intense police and public scrutiny as investigators raided their Nagasaki offices in the search for evidence. A few days later, the Suishin-kai announced that it would voluntarily disband, and most of its members are now affiliated with other groups.
