= Masaru Takumi =

Japanese criminal (1936–1997)

- 宅見 勝
- Takumi featured on a nonfiction book after his death
- Born: June 22, 1936; Chuo-ku, Kobe, Hyogo, Japan
- Died: August 28, 1997 (aged 61); Oriental Hotel, Kobe
- Cause of death: Assassination by gunshots
- Known for: Organized crime figure
- Allegiance: Yamaguchi-gumi

Masaru Takumi (宅見 勝 Takumi Masaru; June 22, 1936 – August 28, 1997) had been a powerful Japanese organized crime figure until he was assassinated in 1997. Until his death, he was the second-in-command (wakagashira) and financial overseer of Japan's largest yakuza gang, the Yamaguchi-gumi. Known as "the man who never sleeps", he also headed his own sub-organization, the 1000-member Takumi-gumi.

== Death ==
He was considered a likely successor to the Yamaguchi-gumi's fifth godfather, Yoshinori Watanabe, but in August 1997, Takumi was shot and killed in a coffee shop on the fourth floor of the Oriental Hotel in Kobe's Shin Kobe Oriental City by members of a breakaway Yamaguchi affiliate, the Nakano-kai. An innocent bystander was killed by a stray bullet in the attack, which led to the downfall of the Nakano-kai.

== Last job ==
His last position at the Yamaguchi-gumi was as wakagashira (the number-two), and after his death, the wakagashira post became vacant and had been vacant until 2005 when it was succeeded by Kiyoshi Takayama. The Takumi-gumi's head position was succeeded by Tadashi Irie.

== Spouse ==
His mistress was the sister of Hideki Saijo, a Japanese singer and actor.

Preceded by (none)	Kumicho of Takumi-gumi; 1967-1997	Succeeded by Tadashi Irie
