= Kiyoshi Takayama =

Japanese mob boss

Takayama Kiyoshi
- 髙山 清司
- Born: September 5, 1947 (age 79); Tsushima, Aichi, Japan
- Occupation: Yakuza
- Years active: 1967-Present
- Known for: The number-two position (Wakagashira) of Yamaguchi-gumi (2005-2025)
- Allegiance: Yamaguchi-gumi
- Criminal charge: Blackmail
- Penalty: 6 years' imprisonment (2014)

Kiyoshi Takayama (髙山 清司, Takayama Kiyoshi; born September 5, 1947 in Tsushima, Aichi) is a yakuza best known as the second-in-command (wakagashira) of the 6th-generation Yamaguchi-gumi, the largest known yakuza syndicate in Japan, and the president of its ruling affiliate, Kodo-kai, based in Nagoya. He stepped down as wakagashira in 2025 and assumed the position of sōdanyaku (advisor).

Takayama has been considered the key person in the entire history of the Kodo-kai and behind the sixth Yamaguchi-gumi, being kept under close surveillance by the National Police Agency. The National Police Agency once distributed a report on its operations against the Yamaguchi-gumi to every police department across the country, which had a special section devoted to him and even made reference to his personality.

In 2012, the Obama administration of the United States imposed sanctions on him as the second-in-command of the Yamaguchi-gumi. The sanctions also targeted Kenichi Shinoda as the leader of the Yamaguchi-gumi, along with several individuals linked to three other transnational organized crime groups, the Brothers' Circle of Russia, the Camorra of Italy, and the Los Zetas of Mexico.

== Career ==
Takayama entered the underworld in his teenage years, and his career as a yakuza officially began at the age of 20 when he joined the Sasaki-gumi, a Yamaguchi-gumi affiliate based in Nagoya. The Sasaki-gumi was a sub organization of the Nagoya-based Hirota-gumi (later known as the Kodo-kai), and in 1969, four members of a Hirota-affiliated organization were murdered by a Kobe-based yakuza syndicate. Along with two other Hirota members (one being Shinobu Tsukasa), he was convicted of murdering the boss of a clan of the syndicate. After spending 4 years in prison, he was released in 1973, becoming the number-two boss (wakagashira) of the Sasaki-gumi in 1975. In 1976 when he was promoted to the managing director (rijicho) of the Sasaki-gumi, he founded his own organization, the Takayama-gumi.

=== Road to the Kobe ===
Shinobu Tsukasa formed the Kodo-kai as the successor to the Hirota-gumi in 1984 after the Hirota-gumi disbanded due to its boss' retirement. Following this, Takayama became the number-three (wakagashira-hosa) of the Kodo-kai, and after his achievements at the Yama-Ichi War, he became the number-two (wakagashira) in 1989, starting a radical reform of the Kodo-kai and forcing many "unwelcome" members including the senior managers into retirement. He succeeded Tsukasa as president (kaicho) of the Kodo-kai in March 2005 when Tsukasa was promoted to the Yamaguchi-gumi's provisional number-two (wakagashira), entering the Kobe headquarters of the Yamaguchi-gumi, as a senior manager (jikisan).

=== The sixth wakagashira ===
Takayama had rapidly been promoted in the headquarters of the Yamaguchi-gumi, and following Tsukasa's assumption of the leadership of the Yamaguchi-gumi, in 2005, he flew the number-two position (wakagashira) at the largest known yakuza syndicate only four months after his entrance into its headquarters. The wakagashira post had been vacant since 1997 when the fifth wakagashira, Masaru Takumi, was assassinated. In 2008, under his dominating influence, the headquarters purged a total of nine "big names" from the syndicate, including Tadamasa Goto as the head of the Goto-gumi, and forced two into temporary suspension, resulting in causing some serious controversies in the entire Yamaguchi-gumi community.

Also in 2008, it was noted that Takayama, as the Yamaguchi-gumi's wakagashira, attended the funeral of Hideo Mizoshita, the third president of the Kudo-kai. The Kudo-kai was a Kyushu-based independent syndicate known as the leading member of an anti-Yamaguchi federation, and he attended this historic funeral as the deputy leader of the Yamaguchi-gumi while the actual leader Tsukasa was in prison.

Meanwhile, in Nagoya, by late 2009, the Kodo-kai's membership had reached 4,000. Originally started with just 25 members, the clan grew to an exceedingly powerful, 4,000-member organization within only 26 years, as noted in the National Police Agency's anti-Yamaguchi strategy report distributed in 2009, and this rapid growth, as an "astounding success", was largely attributed to Takayama.

=== 2010 arrest ===
In November 2010, Takayama, as the "de facto leader of the Yamaguchi-gumi", was arrested on suspicion of extorting more than US$400,000 from a businessman in the construction industry. "If Takayama is successfully prosecuted it will be devastating for the Yamaguchi-gumi, and could even spark a war for control of the organisation," said Jake Adelstein. This arrest came shortly before the top, Shinobu Tsukasa, was due to be released from prison, and soon after this, in December, the number-three boss of the Yamaguchi-gumi, Tadashi Irie, was also arrested.

==== Controversy ====
At the time of the arrest, the victim was reported to be just a 65-year-old man engaged in the construction business. However several doubts had been cast about his true identity, as he did not seem to be a "decent civilian" (katagi); he was reported to be an influential figure in Kyoto's raw concrete industry, and a senior manager of a buraku organization based in Kyoto, who allegedly had a connection with the Yamaken-gumi or even been a member of this Yamaguchi-gumi clan. Yamaken-gumi had been a major internal rival of the Kodo-kai especially since Takayama and Tsukasa joined the headquarters of the Yamaguchi-gumi. Also, the person had allegedly worked as a corporate blackmailer, besides, he had at least one blatant criminal record; he had been convicted of murdering some Korean person in a conflict in his young years. The person's name was later revealed to be Tohbeh Ueda by himself. He was the president of the Kyoto-based buraku organization "Liberal Dowa Association Kyoto", who had been considered a "tycoon" in Kyoto's buraku community. One theory suggests that there was an internal conflict in the Yamaguchi-gumi over the "Kyoto concession(s)" behind the arrest. Many believe that it was highly unlikely for Takayama to make such a "cheap blunder" like that, for a relatively small amount of money (for Takayama). Many believe the Yamaken conspiracy theory, but Takayama has kept silent about the situation

==== Release ====
Takayama was released on bail of 1.5 billion yen (US$19 million) in June 2012.

=== Sōdanyaku ===
In April 2025, wakagashira (underboss) Kiyoshi Takayama stepped down to become a sōdanyaku (advisor), and wakagashira-hosa (deputy underboss) Teruaki Takeuchi was promoted to wakagashira.

== In prison ==
Takayama was held in Fuchū Prison from 2014 but was released in 2019.

== See also ==
- List of crime bosses convicted in the 21st century

Preceded by Shinobu Tsukasa	President of Kodo-kai; 2005–2013	Succeeded by Teruaki Takeuchi
