= Yamaken-gumi =

Street gang founded in Kobe, Japan

- Founded: 1961; 65 years ago
- Founder: Kenichi Yamamoto
- Founding location: Kobe, Japan
- Years active: 1961–present
- Territory: Kobe, Japan
- Ethnicity: Japanese
- Membership (est.): ~800

The Fourth Yamaken-gumi (四代目山健組, Yondaime Yamaken-gumi) is a yakuza gang based in Kobe, Japan. It was the largest affiliate, followed by the Nagoya-based Kodo-kai, of the largest known yakuza syndicate in Japan, the Yamaguchi-gumi until 2015.

== History ==
Yoshinori Watanabe was kumicho (Godfather) of the Yamaken-gumi from 1982 to 1989 before becoming kumicho of the Yamaguchi-gumi. Watanabe retired from that post in July 2005, but the Yamaken-gumi remains largely loyal to him. Many of its members were upset that the sixth Yamaguchi don was not chosen from their ranks, instead, the Nagoya-based Kenichi Shinoda was chosen.

In 2015, the Yamaken-gumi, along with several other organisations, withdrew from the Yamaguchi-gumi and formed the Kobe Yamaguchi-gumi. From 2015 to 2020, it was under the umbrella of the Kobe Yamaguchi-gumi. In August 2020, Koji Nakata, the head of the Yamaken-gumi, declared that the Yamaken-gumi had become independent of the Kobe Yamaguchi-gumi.

On 16 September 2021, the Yamaguchi-gumi announced that it will be welcoming back Yamaken-gumi members who had disunited from them in 2015. As a result, the Yamaken-gumi once again became the umbrella organisation of the Yamaguchi-gumi.

Before the split, the Yamaken-gumi was estimated to have between 3,000 and 7,000 members. Following the split the number dropped to around 800.

== Leadership ==
- 1st kumicho (1961-1982): Kenichi Yamamoto (山本 健一) who was a eldest son (若頭, wakagashira) of the Third Yamaguchi-gumi. He was a former member of Yasuhara-kai (安原会).
- 2nd kumicho (1982-1989): Yoshinori Watanabe (渡辺 芳則) who was wakagashira of the Fourth Yamaguchi-gumi. He was 1st kaicho (会長) of the Kenryu-kai (健竜会), and would later become kumicho of the Fifth Yamaguchi-gumi.
- 3rd kumicho (1989-2005): Kaneyoshi Kuwata (桑田 兼吉) who is a eldest son's assistant (若頭補佐, wakagashira-hosa) of the Fifth Yamaguchi-gumi. He was kaicho of the Second Kenryu-kai.
- 4th kumicho (2005-2018): Kunio Inoue (井上 邦雄) who was a kambu (幹部) of the Sixth Yamaguchi-gumi. He was kaicho of the Fourth Kenryu-kai. He is an adopted son of Kuwata.
- 5th kumicho (2018-): Koji Nakata (中田 浩二) who is a kambu (幹部) of the Sixth Yamaguchi-gumi. He was kaicho of the Fifth Kenryu-kai.
