= Takumi-gumi =

Japanese yakuza gang

The Second Takumi-gumi is a Japanese yakuza syndicate. The Kansai-based yakuza was founded in 1967 by Masaru Takumi, the longtime second-in-command (wakagashira) and financial oversteer of the Yamaguchi-gumi.

Takumi was kumicho of yakuza's 1000-members until his assassination in Kobe in 1997 by members of the Nakano-kai. His successor, Tadashi Irie, is the current kumicho.

In 2015, the Takumi-gumi, along with other yakuza organisations, withdrew from the Yamaguchi-gumi to form the Kobe Yamaguchi-gumi, which withdrew from the Kobe Yamaguchi-gumi in 2022. By 2023 they had only about 20 members.
