= Shiro Suzuki (politician) =

Japanese politician and mayor (born 1967)

- 鈴木 史朗
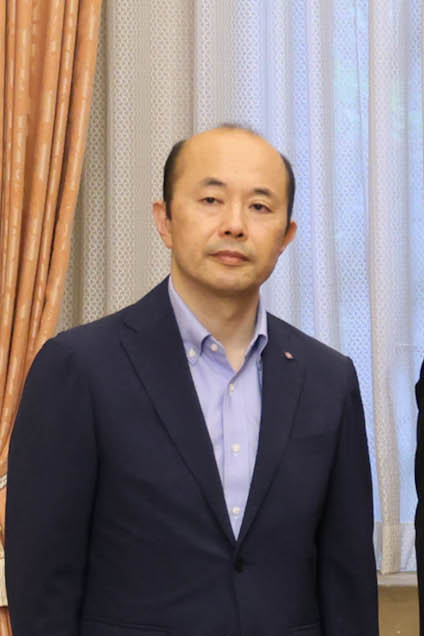
- Suzuki in 2024

Mayor of Nagasaki
- Incumbent
- Assumed office April 26, 2023
- Preceded by: Tomihisa Taue

Personal details
- Born: July 16, 1967 (age 59) Nagasaki, Japan
- Party: Independent
- Education: University of Tokyo
- Website: suzuki46.jp

Shiro Suzuki (鈴木 史朗, born July 16, 1967) is a Japanese politician serving as the mayor of Nagasaki, the capital city of Nagasaki Prefecture.

== Education and career ==
After graduating from the University of Tokyo, Faculty of Law, Shiro Suzuki joined the former Ministry of Transport in 1991. Suzuki completed his graduate studies at London School of Economics and Political Science (1998), The George Washington University Law School (2007), The Fletcher School of Law and Diplomacy, Tufts University (2008).

He left the current Ministry of Land, Infrastructure, Transportation and Tourism in December 2022 to run for the Mayor of Nagasaki. On April 26, 2023, Shiro Suzuki became the 36th Mayor of Nagasaki. His grandfather, Tsutomu Tagawa (田川 務) was also the Mayor of Nagasaki during 1951 - 1967. Tagawa was a lawyer.

== Controversy ==
On 2 August 2024, Suzuki announced that Israeli ambassador Gilad Cohen was not invited to the ceremony marking the 79th anniversary of the atomic bombing of Nagasaki due to concerns over potential protests related to the Gaza war. In response, the ambassadors of the United States and the United Kingdom chose not to attend the event on 9 August and sent lower-ranked diplomats instead. The ambassadors of Russia and Belarus were also not invited to the ceremony, while the Palestinian ambassador was invited.

Political offices
Preceded by Tomihisa Taue	Mayor of Nagasaki; 2023–present	Incumbent
