= Toi Inagawa =

Japanese yakuza member

Toi Inagawa (稲川 土肥, Inagawa Toi; 1940 – May 29, 2005), a.k.a. Yuko Inagawa (稲川 裕紘, Inagawa Yuko), was kaicho (Godfather) of the Inagawa-kai yakuza gang in Japan from 1990 until 2005. He was also second socho of the Inagawa-ikka.

Inagawa was the son of Kakuji Inagawa, the gang's founder. In 1990, he took over from Susumu Ishii to become the Inagawa-kai's third kaicho.

Toi Inagawa died in May 2005. As of October 2005, a clear successor has not emerged, but Inagawa's son Hideki Inagawa is seen as the most likely candidate.

Preceded by Susumu Ishii	Kaicho of Inagawa-kai; 1990–2005	Succeeded by Hideki Inagawa?
