= Hitoshi Motoshima =

Japanese politician (1922–2014)

- 本島 等

Mayor of Nagasaki
- In office 2 May 1979 – 1 May 1995
- Preceded by: Yoshitake Morotani
- Succeeded by: Iccho Itoh

Member of the Nagasaki Prefectural Assembly
- In office 1959–1979

Personal details
- Born: 20 February 1922 Shin-Kamigotō, Nagasaki, Japan
- Died: 31 October 2014 (aged 92) Nagasaki, Japan
- Party: Liberal Democratic
- Education: Kyoto University
- Occupation: Teacher

Hitoshi Motoshima (本島 等, Motoshima Hitoshi; 20 February 1922 – 31 October 2014) was a Japanese politician. He served four terms as mayor of Nagasaki from 1979 to 1995. He publicly made controversial statements about the responsibility of Japan and its then-reigning Emperor for World War II, and survived a retaliatory assassination attempt in 1990 by a right wing fanatic. His mayoral successor, Iccho Itoh, was killed in an unrelated assassination in 2007.

== Early life and education ==
Motoshima was born on 20 February 1922, in Shinkamigotō, Nagasaki. During World War II the Japanese authorities suspected Motoshima of espionage because he was a descendant of Kakure Kirishitans and born out of wedlock. When he was twenty-one he was drafted into the Imperial Japanese Army and became an artillery officer; he was stationed near Kumamoto and did not see combat before the war ended. Motoshima witnessed the aftermath of the atomic bombing of his hometown when he returned to Nagasaki about six weeks after it was bombed.

He was admitted to the Kyoto University Engineering Department, but due to World War II did not graduate until he was twenty-seven years old. Motoshima worked as a teacher before entering politics.

== Political career ==
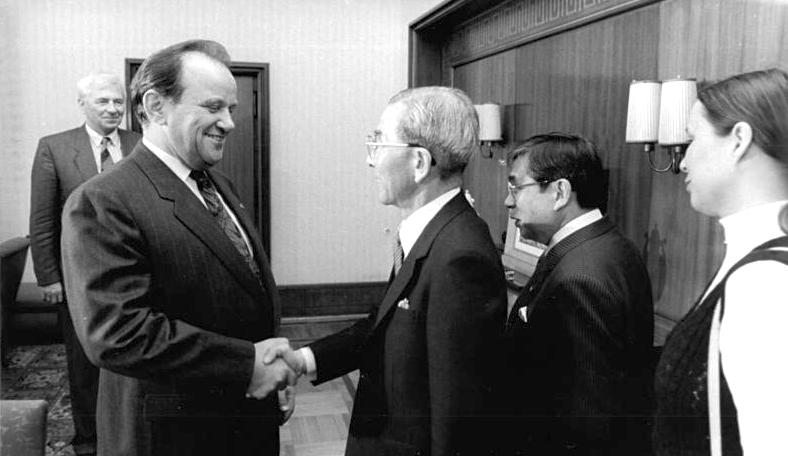
The delegations from Hiroshima, led by Mayor Takeshi Araki (centre) and from Nagasaki, led by Mayor Hitoshi Motoshima (right), were welcomed by the Mayor of Berlin, Erhard Krack (left) on the occasion of the international meeting of mayors to mark Berlin's 750th anniversary.

Motoshima served as a Nagasaki Prefectural Legislature representative for five terms (twenty years) before being elected mayor of Nagasaki. While mayor he worked as chairman of the Liberal Democratic Party Nagasaki Prefecture Committee.

Following the mayor's controversial remarks and an attempt on his life, in the 1991 mayoral election the Communist Party did not run their own candidate and essentially supported Motoshima, who won re-election to a fourth term with additional cooperation from other progressive forces. However, facing much criticism, Motoshima lost the 1995 election to Liberal Democratic Party-endorsed opponent, Iccho Itoh, and retired from politics.

=== Assassination attempt ===
In late 1988 during his third mayoral term, news that the Shōwa Emperor was gravely ill and not expected to live long had put Japan into a somber mood. On 7 December Motoshima was asked in a city council meeting by a council member from the Japanese Communist Party his opinion of the Emperor's responsibility for World War II. He answered:

Forty-three years have passed since the end of the war, and I think we have had enough chance to reflect on the nature of the war. From reading various accounts from abroad and having been a soldier myself, involved in military education, I do believe that the emperor bore responsibility for the war...

— (Buruma 1994:249)

The Liberal Democratic Party Prefectural Committee immediately demanded that he retract the statement, but Motoshima rejected the demand, saying he could not betray his conscience. In response, the Party Prefectural Committee removed him from the post of committee advisor, and many conservative organizations vilified the mayor. Furthermore, many extreme right-wing groups converged on Nagasaki and demonstrated in the streets with more than eighty speaker trucks calling out for divine retribution upon the mayor.

On 18 January 1990, when police had relaxed their guard on the mayor, Kazumi Wakashima, also known as Kazumi Tajiri (born 1949), a member of the right-wing group Seikijuku, shot Motoshima in the back, but he survived the assassination attempt. Wakashima was found guilty of attempted murder and sentenced to 12 years in prison. He served out his full term, and was released from prison in 2002.

In 1998 Motoshima again attracted controversy by making statements such as, "It was a matter of course for atomic bombs to have been dropped on Japan, which had launched a war of aggression. Japan does not have the right to criticize the atomic bomb." for Kyodo News's interview. He is also quoted as saying, conversely, that the bombing was "one of the two great crimes against humanity in the 20th Century, along with the Holocaust."

== Awards and honors ==
In 2002 Motoshima was awarded both the first Korea/Japan Peace and Fellowship Prize and the Order of Merit of the Federal Republic of Germany.

== Death ==
On 31 October 2014, he died at the age of 92.

== See also ==
- Uyoku dantai
- Japanese militarism
- Sonnō jōi

Political offices
Preceded by Yoshitake Morotani	Mayor of Nagasaki; 1979–1995	Succeeded by Iccho Itoh
