= Inagawa Circuit =

Motor racing circuit in Inagawa, Kawabe, Hyōgo, Japan

- Location: Inagawa, Kawabe District, Hyōgo Prefecture, West Japan
- Coordinates: 34.97465°N 135.30685°E
- Opened: Unknown
- Closed: 2015
- Major events: SL Inagawa Series
- Website: http://www.ab.auone-net.jp/~inagawa/
- Length: 1.021 km (0.63 miles)
- Turns: 9

Inagawa Circuit was a 1.021-kilometre (0.63 mi) motorcycle and kart racing circuit in Inagawa, Kawabe, Hyōgo, Japan. The facility also had an off-road course for motorcycle trials.

Prior to 2010, it was an officially recognized circuit of the Motorcycle Federation of Japan. The track was temporarily closed and renovated in 2012, playing host to the SL Inagawa Series kart championship (run by the SL Kartsports Organization), and closed indefinitely in 2015 following a 2014 lawsuit.
