= Yutaka Inagawa =

Japanese artist (born 1974)

- Born: February 23, 1974 (age 52); Tokyo
- Occupation: Artist

Yutaka Inagawa (b. 23 Feb 1974) is a Japanese artist trained in painting, line drawing, and photography who specialises in exploiting digital photomontage.

== Biography ==
Born in Tokyo, Japan, he grew up in the Ikebukuro district. In 1997, he graduated first in his class at the Tokyo National University of Fine Arts and Music, then went on to gain a master's degree in fine arts in 2004 from Chelsea College of Art and Design in London, England. Since then he has lived and worked in London.

Inagawa's art blends the delicate and the grotesque, juxtaposing photographic fragments, line art and painting to produce complex abstract works. His work is inspired by the concept of uneasy lack of harmony between tradition and modernity in the fast-paced, constantly changing urban world. He sees parallels between his work and the way in which his home city, Tokyo, has absorbed western conventions into Japanese culture without any "proper synthesis or reconciliation". He builds his organic-looking images from collections of carefully cut out photographic elements - including machinery, fish, road signs, leaves, weapons, furniture - the everyday alongside the unusual - the threatening with the benign - but intertwined so that the original forms are almost indiscernible.

Inagawa's work has been on display in numerous exhibitions throughout the world. He was shortlisted for the Celeste Art Prize in both 2006 and 2007.

== Exhibitions ==
- 1996: "Sanyou-Ten", Myu Gallery, Kanda, Tokyo, Japan
- 2004: XHIBIT 04, The Arts Gallery, London
- 2004: MA fine art show, Chelsea College of Art and Design
- 2005: Galerie Suty, Coye-la-Forêt, France
- 2005: St'Art, Strasbourg Art Fair, Strasbourg, France
- 2005: "Hybrid", Style Cube Zandari, Seoul, South Korea
- 2005: Summer Exhibition 2005, Royal Academy of Arts, London
- 2006: "Synchro-Tron", Aqffin Gallery, London
- 2007: New Art Center, New York City
- 2008: "Cosmopolis", Pippy Houldsworth Gallery, London
- 2008: "Around the Clock", I-MYU, London
- 2008: "Nonplace overlay", Bodhi Gallery, London
- 2009: "Sensory Cocktails", Gallery Zandari, Seoul, Korea
- 2009: "Crazytokyo", Galerie Suty, France
- 2013: "Slow Life: Generation in Exchanges", Yachiyono Oka Museum of Art, Akitakata, Hiroshima
- 2016: "OTAK JEPUN", Lorong Kekabu, Kuala Lumpur
- 2014–15: "Yutaka Inagawa: The Invasion of Cyberspace", curated by Christina Mitrentse, Unit 24 Gallery, London
- 2017–18: "Floating Urban Slime/Sublime", presented and directed by Yutaka Inagawa, Art Gallery Miyauchi, Hiroshima
