= Nakano-kai =

The Nakano-kai (中野会) was a notorious Osaka-based yakuza gang, founded by Taro Nakano (born October 30, 1936, in Oita) in the years after World War 2. The Nakano-kai was known for its fierce bellicosity and thus sometimes dubbed the "Dojin-kai in the Yamaguchi-gumi".

Before 1997, the Nakano-kai had been an affiliate of the Kobe-based Yamaguchi-gumi, Japan's largest yakuza group. But in July of that year, the Nakano-kai broke spectacularly from its parent in a violent attack that led to the group's disbanding.

In August 1997, four Nakano-kai gunmen walked into the Oriental Hotel in Kobe and assassinated Masaru Takumi, number 2 in the Yamaguchi-gumi and the expected successor to Yoshinori Watanabe. The Nakano-kai was reportedly angry at Takumi for ordering them to cease hostilities in a local Osaka gang war. The attack also killed an innocent bystander, dentist Hiroshi Hirai. Public outrage over the shooting led to a police crackdown and the arrest of many of the gang's members (however, two of the hotel gunmen are still at large as of 2005). The gang was disbanded shortly thereafter.
