= Tokutaro Takayama =

Zainichi Korean yakuza boss (1928–2003)

Tokutaro Takayama 高山 登久太郎
- Born: Kang Oe-soo (강외수); 1928; Higashinari-ku, Osaka, Japan
- Died: June 15, 2003 (aged 74–75)

Tokutaro Takayama (高山 登久太郎, Takayama Tokutarō; 1928 – June 15, 2003) was a yakuza, the president of the Fourth Aizukotetsu-kai. An ethnic Korean, he rose to power as the head of the Kyoto-based gang until his retirement in the 1990s.

When he was a young man, his parents returned to Korea, leaving him to earn a living alone in Japan: "At that time," Takayama said in 1998, "I had no choice but to join the Japanese gangster world. This is because segregated people at that time had no way to survive in Japan."

For a yakuza boss, he was a remarkably public figure, often granting interviews to Japanese and foreign reporters for articles in which he always came off as a gentleman. He even filed a lawsuit against the Shiga Prefectural Police for infringing on his rights to free expression. (See court testimony). He viewed himself as an honorable outlaw, championing the weak and upholding the yakuza code of ninkyo (chivalry): "We did not regard ninkyo as a bad thing," he said. "Thus, we never killed anyone without reason. I strongly believed ninkyo must help the people. It was my job."

In 1992 the Aizukotetsu-kai became one of the first yakuza syndicates named under Japan's new anti-violence group legislation, which gave police expanded powers to crack down on yakuza. Takayama campaigned publicly against the new laws, even writing a book on the subject, and the group launched a lawsuit challenging their constitutionality. Takayama eventually faced pressure from outside and from within his group to drop the suit, but he refused to compromise. According to Manabu Miyazaki, Takayama said at the time: "I can't accept what the government is doing. If I pull out now, I won't be able to die in peace. I'm not prepared to make any compromises, and I certainly don't intend to quit." In September 1995 the Kyoto District Court threw out the lawsuit.

Takayama retired as kaicho (Godfather) in 1997. He died in June 2003.

Preceded by Yoshitaro Nakagawa	kumicho of Nakagawa-gumi; 1969-19**	Succeeded by Takeo Tsuda
Preceded by Riichi Zukoshi	kaicho of Aizukotetsu; 1986-1997	Succeeded by
