= Yama–Ichi War =

Japanese Yakuza war (1985–1989)

Yama-Ichi War
Date	1985–1989
Location	Kansai region, Japan
Result	Yamaguchi-gumi victory: Several Yamaguchi-gumi members later arrested due to increased police attention

Combatants
Government of Japan: Prefectural Police; In Hawaii: US Government: Federal Bureau of Investigation	Ichiwa-kai	Yamaguchi-gumi

Casualties and losses
None	Unknown	Unknown
- Over 36 killed in total

The Yama–Ichi Feud (山一抗争, Yama-Ichi Kōsō) was a yakuza conflict mainly fought in the Kansai region of Japan from 1985 to 1989, between the Yamaguchi-gumi and the Ichiwa-kai gangs.

== Background ==
Kazuo Taoka was the third boss of the Kobe-based Yamaguchi-gumi, who made the family into by far the biggest yakuza family in Japan. When he died of natural causes in 1981, then wakagashira (underboss) Kenichi Yamamoto was in prison and the other top lieutenants decided to wait for his release. However, in early 1982, Yamamoto suddenly died of liver failure. After his death, the top lieutenants could not immediately elect a boss, and they temporarily chose Hiroshi Yamamoto as acting boss and Masahisa Takenaka as wakagashira.

The circumstances that precipitated the conflict were as follows: Hiroshi Yamamoto, accompanied by 18 of his lieutenants and 3,000 other individuals, seceded from the Yamaguchi-gumi to establish his own organization, the Ichiwa-kai. This division stemmed from professional envy, as Yamamoto was viewed as a potential candidate for the esteemed title of kumicho, or supreme godfather, within the Yamaguchi-gumi. However, his aspirations were thwarted when Masahisa Takenaka was chosen for the role by the other members, including the influential Fumiko Taoka, widow of Kazuo Taoka.

== Feud ==
On January 26, 1985, Yamamoto sent a team of hitmen to Takenaka's girlfriend's home in Suita. While waiting for an elevator, Takenaka, underboss Katsumasa Nakayama, and one other member of the family were shot dead, sparking a bloody nationwide conflict that came to be known as the Yama–Ichi War. The enraged Yamaguchi-gumi and its newly chosen acting boss Kazuo Nakanishi and wakagashira Yoshinori Watanabe vowed to wipe out the Ichiwa-kai in revenge.

In the years that followed, 36 gangsters were killed and many more were seriously wounded in an estimated 300 gun battles. At the time, local newspapers carried daily "scorecards" with the latest body counts on both sides.

The war continued for several years, and the Yamaguchi-gumi eventually prevailed. It proved to be a pyrrhic victory however, as many of the gang's members, including Masahisa Takenaka's high-ranking brother Masashi, were arrested in the ensuing police crackdowns. Realizing they were outnumbered and outgunned, many Ichiwa-kai members sought police protection. With the help of a neutral Tokyo gang, the Inagawa-kai, a peace accord was finally brokered under which the remaining Ichiwa-kai defectors were allowed to rejoin the Yamaguchi-gumi.

== Aftermath ==
In 1989, Yoshinori Watanabe was elected as fifth kumicho of the Yamaguchi-gumi.
