= Iccho Itoh =

Japanese politician (1945–2007)

- 伊藤 一長

Mayor of Nagasaki
- In office 2 May 1995 – 18 April 2007
- Preceded by: Hitoshi Motoshima
- Succeeded by: Tomihisa Taue

Personal details
- Born: 23 August 1945 Nagato, Yamaguchi, Japan
- Died: 18 April 2007 (aged 61) Nagasaki, Japan
- Party: Liberal Democratic
- Education: Waseda University

Iccho Itoh (伊藤 一長, 23 August 1945 – 18 April 2007) was a Japanese politician who served as the mayor of Nagasaki from 1995 to 2007.

Itoh was fatally shot by Tetsuya Shiroo, a member of the yakuza, on 17 April 2007 and died the following morning.

== Early life ==
Kazunaga Itō was born on 23 August 1945 in Nagato, Yamaguchi Prefecture, 8 days after the Surrender of Japan and two weeks after the atomic bombings of Hiroshima and Nagasaki. Itoh's family moved to his father's hometown of Nagasaki when he was three years-old. Itoh first aspired to become mayor of Nagasaki while attending Nishi Prefectural High School, and after graduating from Waseda University with a degree in political science began working for the Nagasaki City Development Corporation.

Itoh's first name (一長) was originally pronounced Kazunaga in the kun-yomi reading, but he elected to use more euphonious on-yomi reading of Itchō or Iccho for his mayoralty. Itoh's name was romanized as Itcho Ito by Mainichi Shimbun, Reuters, and Al-Jazeera. CNN used the Iccho Ito romanization. The Asahi Shimbun used Iccho Itoh. Itoh spelled his name romanized as Iccho Itoh in his English language letter to U.S. President George W. Bush.

== Career ==
In 1973, Itoh became the chairman of the Nagasaki City Youth Organization Council, overseeing an event of 700 young people sailing from Nagasaki to Naha, Okinawa Prefecture and Busan, South Korea as part of a program to strengthen Nagasaki's ties with those cities.

Itoh served in the Nagasaki city assembly and the Nagasaki Prefecture assembly as a member of the Liberal Democratic Party before he was elected as the mayor of Nagasaki in 1995. Itoh was recommended by the Liberal Democratic Party as their main candidate for mayor of Nagasaki, favored over more established LDP politicians and the controversial incumbent LDP mayor Hitoshi Motoshima. Itoh defeated Motoshima in the mayoral election in 1995, and was re-elected for his second term as mayor in 1999. Itoh won his third term in 2003, supported by both the LDP and Komeito, defeating candidates supported by the Liberal Party and the Communist Party by a large margin.

=== Mayor of Nagasaki ===
Itoh began his first term as mayor of Nagasaki on 2 May 1995, running a city government that was characterized as promoting tourism and revitalization of the city.

Itoh was a vocal critic of nuclear weapons as mayor of Nagasaki, and the United States as one of the world's main nuclear states in particular. On 7 November 1995, Itoh made a speech at the International Court of Justice in the Hague stressing that, as the mayor of a city where an atomic bomb was dropped just two weeks before his birth, the use of nuclear weapons is a violation of international law. In August 2002, at a commemoration of the atomic bombing of Nagasaki, Itoh criticized the United States' nuclear weapons policy in the aftermath of the September 11 attacks. In May 2005, at a Nuclear Non-Proliferation Treaty conference, Itoh claimed that mankind and nuclear weapons cannot co-exist together. In 2006, Itoh criticized the United States and North Korea for conducting nuclear tests. Early in Itoh's mayorship, there was controversy over plans to demolish some ruins from the atomic bombing of Nagasaki to reuse the land, but this was eventually scrapped after a protest at Nagasaki Peace Park.

Itoh's city government ran a program encouraging Nagasaki schools to use vegetables and other ingredients produced in the local area in their school meals.

In 2005, Itoh opened the Nagasaki Museum of History and Culture and Nagasaki Prefectural Art Museum to replace the former Nagasaki Prefectural Museum and Art Museum that had closed in 2002.

== Assassination ==
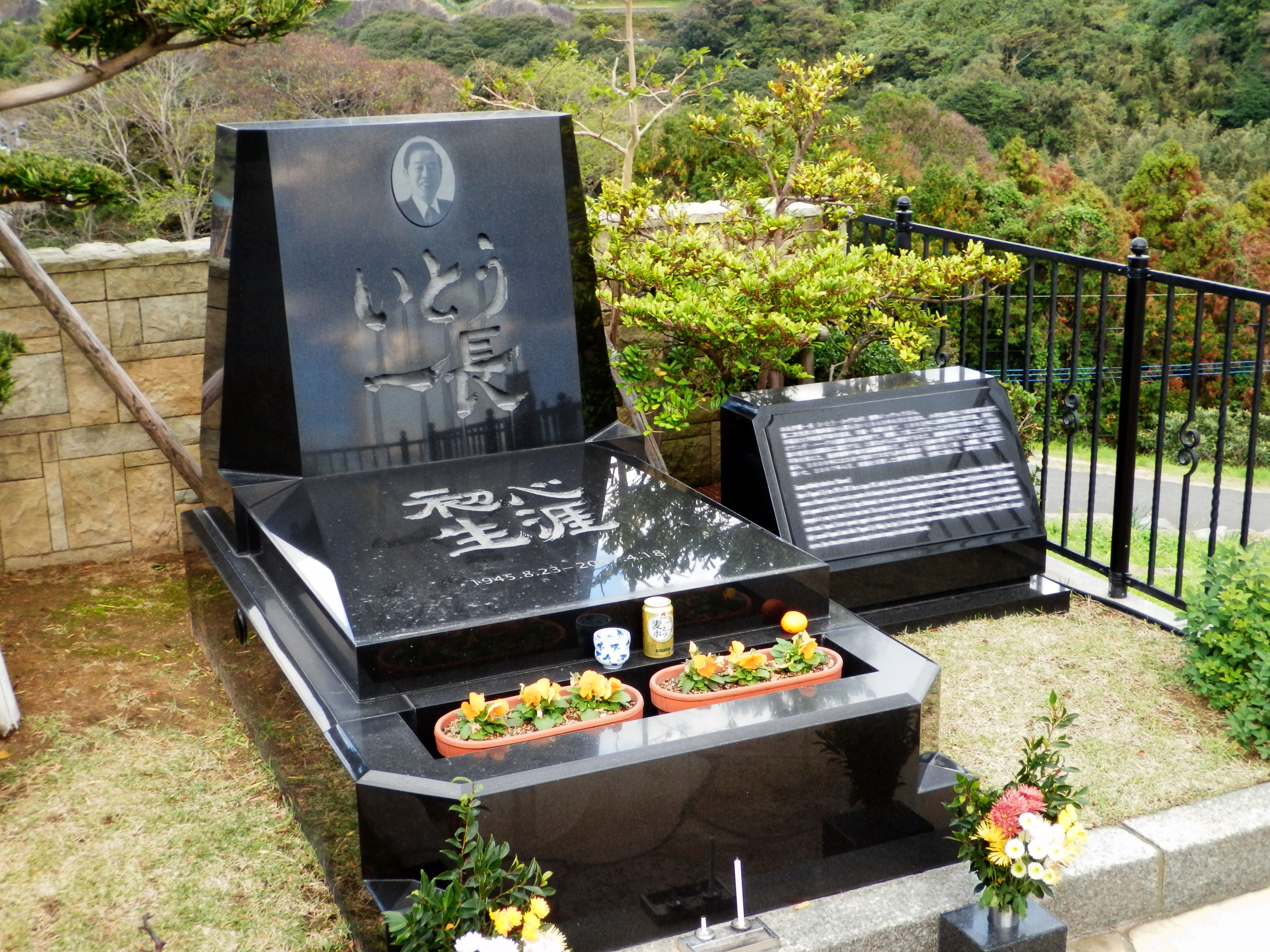
Itoh's gravesite in Sotome, Nagasaki.

On 17 April 2007, while campaigning for re-election for his fourth term, Itoh was shot twice in the back at point-blank range by Tetsuya Shiroo while exiting a car in front of his campaign office outside Nagasaki Station. Itoh was taken to the Nagasaki University Hospital in a state of cardiopulmonary arrest and underwent four hours of emergency operations, but he died early the next morning due to blood loss. Itoh's death triggered a new mayoral election held on 22 April 2007. Itoh's son-in-law, Makoto Yokoo (橫尾 誠, Yokoo Makoto), and a city official, Tomihisa Taue (田上 富久, Taue Tomihisa), filed for candidacy in the election. Taue was elected as Itoh's successor.

Police arrested Shiroo on suspicion of the murder after he was detained by Itoh's entourage and passersby following the shooting. Shiroo was a leader of the Suishin-kai, a Nagasaki-based yakuza group affiliated with the Yamaguchi-gumi, the largest yakuza organization in Japan. Shiroo had shot Itoh with a Smith & Wesson Model 36 and was found with 20 bullets in his possession upon arrest. Several theories exist for Shiroo's motive to shoot Itoh, with the main theory being a personal grudge against Itoh and the city government for an incident in 2003. Shiroo filed an insurance claim for damage to his car when he drove it into a hole dug for public works, but the city refused to compensate him. Shiroo had mailed a letter to TV Asahi about the issue, and it was public knowledge before the shooting. Additionally, Shiroo was also reportedly angry that a construction company linked to the Suishin-kai had been denied a contract by the city government. Itoh's assassination had not been approved by the Yamaguchi-gumi and led to greater public scrutiny of yakuza activity. The Suishin-kai's offices were raided by police for evidence, and the gang announced their intention to voluntarily disband days later.

On 26 May 2008, the Nagasaki District Court sentenced Shiroo to death, but the Fukuoka High Court revoked the death sentence and resentenced him to life in prison.

Itoh was the second mayor of Nagasaki to be shot; his immediate predecessor Hitoshi Motoshima (本島 等, Motoshima Hitoshi) was shot in 1990, but survived.

Political offices
Preceded by Hitoshi Motoshima	Mayor of Nagasaki; 1995–2007	Succeeded by Tomihisa Taue
