= Kiyoshi Ōkubo =

Japanese serial killer and rapist

- Born: Kiyoshi Ōkubo; January 17, 1935; Gunma, Empire of Japan
- Died: January 22, 1976 (aged 41); Tokyo Detention House, Tokyo, Japan
- Cause of death: Execution by hanging
- Other names: Gunma's Stalin; The Gunma Kodaira
- Penalty: Death

Details
- Victims: 8
- Span of crimes: March 31 – May 10, 1971
- Country: Japan
- State: Gunma
- Date apprehended: May 14, 1971

Kiyoshi Ōkubo (大久保 清, Ōkubo Kiyoshi; January 17, 1935 – January 22, 1976) was a Japanese serial killer. Between March 31, 1971, and May 10, 1971, he raped and murdered eight girls and women. He used a pen name, Tanigawa Ivan (谷川伊凡).

== Early life ==
Ōkubo was born in Takasaki, Gunma Prefecture. He was a quarter Russian. His mother, who was half Russian and half Japanese, doted on him even after he grew up. He was bullied by other children after the Pacific War began on December 8, 1941.

== Sexual offenses and murders ==
He raped a woman on July 12, 1955. On December 26, 1955, he attempted to rape another woman but was unsuccessful. He was arrested, put in jail, and then released on December 15, 1959. On April 16, 1960, he attempted to rape another woman but was again unsuccessful. The victim, however, withdrew the charge.

On May 5, 1961, he married a woman and had a son and a daughter. He threatened a man on June 3, 1965, and then raped two women on December 23, 1966, and February 24, 1967. On June 7, 1967, he served a prison sentence in Fuchū Prison for rape and blackmail, but he was later released on parole on March 2, 1971, and returned home.

Between March 31 and May 10, 1971, he killed eight women. On May 7, 1971, a 21-year-old female office worker in Fujioka City disappeared while riding a bicycle. Later, on May 13, her brother found her bicycle in Fujioka City and saw a man driving a Mazda Rotary Coupe. When the brother approached to question him, Ōkubo ran away. The brother then reported the man's license plate, and Ōkubo was caught in Maebashi by the police. In two months, Ōkubo has invited more than 150 young women; nearly 50 women got in the car, 30 of whom he had sex with, and the 8 women who were killed and their bodies abandoned because they resisted. He found Ōkubo, and the police finally arrested him on May 14, 1971. The eight women whom he killed are:

1. Miyako Tsuda (津田 美也子, Tsuda Miyako) – 17 years old
2. Mieko Oikawa (老川 美枝子, Oikawa Mieko) – 17 years old
3. Chieko Ida (伊田 千恵子, Ida Chieko) – 19 years old
4. Seiko Kawabata (川端 成子, Kawabata Seiko) – 17 years old
5. Akemi Sato (佐藤 明美, Satō Akemi) – 16 years old
6. Kazuyo Kawaho (川保 和代, Kawaho Kazuyo) – 18 years old
7. Reiko Takemura (竹村 礼子, Takemura Reiko) – 21 years old
8. Naoko Takanohashi (鷹嘴 直子, Takanohashi Naoko) – 21 years old

== Trial and execution ==
The district court in Maebashi sentenced Ōkubo to death by hanging on February 22, 1973. He did not appeal and was executed on January 22, 1976. It was reported that he could not stand up on the day of his execution.

== In media ==
Ōkubo's crime led to Tsukuba Akira writing a book called "Spring of 1971 in Gunma: The Crime of Kiyoshi Okubo". It later became a TV drama on August 29, 1983, titled The Crime of Kiyoshi Ōkubo (大久保清の犯罪, Ōkubo Kiyoshi no Hanzai). Takeshi Kitano played Ōkubo in the drama.

== See also ==
- List of serial killers by country
- Volunteer (capital punishment)
