= Masahisa Takenaka =

Japanese mob boss

- Born: Himeji, Japan
- Died: 1985; Osaka, Japan

Masahisa Takenaka (竹中 正久, Takenaka Masahisa; d. 1985) was the fourth-generation boss of Yamaguchi-gumi, Japan's largest yakuza gang. The New York Times called him "Japan's Godfather".

Takenaka took the role of kumichō in 1984, in a televised investiture ceremony in which Fumiko, the widow of former Yamaguchi-gumi leader Kazuo Taoka, handed him a dagger. However, Takenaka was assassinated at a girlfriend's home in Osaka early the following year by a rival group, the Ichiwa-kai, led by Hiroshi Yamamoto, who had seceded from the clan.

Takenaka's Buddhist funeral service was televised, with more than 1,000 gangsters attending in person to mourn the death of their leader. The killing sparked the Yama–Ichi War.

Preceded by Kazuo Taoka	Kumicho of Yamaguchi-gumi; 1984–1985	Succeeded by Yoshinori Watanabe
