= Kenichi Shinoda =

Japanese yakuza (born 1942)

Kenichi Shinoda 篠田建市
- Born: January 25, 1942 (age 84); Ōita, Ōita Prefecture, Empire of Japan
- Other name: 司 忍 Tsukasa Shinobu

Kenichi Shinoda (篠田 建市, Shinoda Ken'ichi; born January 25, 1942), also known as Shinobu Tsukasa (司 忍, Tsukasa Shinobu), is a Japanese yakuza and the sixth and current kumicho (supreme kingpin, or chairman) of the Yamaguchi-gumi, Japan's largest yakuza organization.

== Career ==
Shinoda was born in Ōita, Kyushu.

After graduating from Oita Prefectural Fisheries High School (currently Oita Prefectural High School of Marine Science), he got a job at a major local fisheries company.

He began his yakuza career in 1962 when he joined the Hirota-gumi, a Nagoya-based Yamaguchi-gumi affiliate. Following the disbanding of the Hirota-gumi, he founded the Kodo-kai with Kiyoshi Takayama among others in 1984 as the successor to the Hirota-gumi.

Under Shinoda and his long-term partner Takayama, the Kodo-kai was a successful branch of the Yamaguchi-Gumi, establishing branches in 18 prefectures—including expansion into the Kantō region, traditionally not Yamaguchi territory.

Shinoda took control of the 40,000-strong gang on July 29, 2005 after the retirement of previous don Yoshinori Watanabe. Under Shinoda, the Kobe-based Yamaguchi-gumi is expected to continue that expansion into Tokyo and Eastern Japan. According to both yakuza and police, this movement would inevitably create conflict between the Yamaguchi-gumi and the Kanto-Hatsukakai, a federation of Tokyo-based yakuza groups including the Inagawa-kai and the Sumiyoshi-kai.

Shinoda is the first Yamaguchi-gumi kumicho not to hail from the Kansai region. He also eschews the "supreme Godfather" image, at least in public; after his appointment as kumicho, he insisted on taking the train to his induction ceremony instead of a chauffeured limousine. He also reportedly stopped in a street ramen noodle restaurant on the way to the lavish yakuza banquet arranged in his honor.

== Arrests ==
In the early 1970s, Shinoda was convicted of murdering a rival yakuza boss with a katana, and spent 13 years in prison. He was also involved, as the head of the Kodo-kai, in the Yamaguchi-gumi's numerous historic yakuza wars. Notably his achievements at the Yama-Ichi War in the late 1980s was a major reason for his entrance into the Yamaguchi-gumi's Kobe headquarters.

On December 4, 2005, only four months after being named kumicho, Shinoda began serving a six-year prison sentence for gun possession after the Japanese Supreme Court finally rejected his appeal of a 1997 conviction. In the 1997 case, one of his bodyguards was caught with an illegal pistol, and Shinoda was convicted of "conspiring" with the bodyguard.

== After release ==
In September 2011, Shinoda responded to an interview with a Sankei newspaper and criticized the police authorities for the gang exclusion ordinance. In 2012, it was reported that he and his executives had visited Kobe Gokoku Shrine in Hyogo Prefecture, HQ early on New Year's Day, which was closed to the general public. At midnight on January 1, 2016, he visited Kobe Gokuni Shrine for the first time since the Yamaguchi-Gumi split.

== U.S. sanctions in 2012 ==
In 2012, the Obama administration of the United States imposed sanctions on him as the leader of the Yamaguchi-gumi, along with his second-in-command Kiyoshi Takayama. The sanctions also targeted several individuals linked to three other transnational organized crime groups, the Brothers' Circle of Russia, the Camorra of Italy, and Los Zetas of Mexico.

Preceded by Yoshinori Watanabe	President of Yamaguchi-gumi; 2005-present	Succeeded by (incumbent)
Preceded by Takeshi Hirota (former Hirota-gumi)	President of Kodo-kai; 1984-2005	Succeeded by Kiyoshi Takayama
