= Harukichi Yamaguchi =

Japanese mob boss (1881–1938)

- Born: April 29, 1881; Tsuna, Hyōgo
- Died: January 17, 1938 (aged 57)

Harukichi Yamaguchi (山口 春吉, Yamaguchi Harukichi; April 29, 1881 – January 17, 1938) was the founder of the Yamaguchi-gumi, which grew to become Japan's largest and most powerful yakuza organization.

Yamaguchi established the group in Kobe in 1915, and was its kumicho or Godfather until 1925 when he was succeeded by his son Noboru Yamaguchi.

Yamaguchi died at the age of 57.

Preceded by (none)	Kumicho of Yamaguchi-gumi; 1915-1925	Succeeded by Noboru Yamaguchi
