= Nina Ognianova =

Bulgarian journalist and activist

Nina Ognianova (Bulgarian: Нина Огнянова) is a Bulgarian journalist and rights activist, coordinator of the Europe and Central Asia Program of the Committee to Protect Journalists since 2006. Formerly a staff writer for the International Journalists' Network, since 2007 she has been a prominent figure in the investigations of the murders of Russian, Central Asian and Turkish journalists. In September 2009 she published a report Anatomy of Injustice on unsolved journalist murders in Russia, and in October 2012 published Turkey's Press Freedom Crisis, which investigates the anti-press campaign under Prime Minister Recep Tayyip Erdoğan. She has written numerous articles for major world newspapers; in September 2009 she authored an article "Getting away with murder in Russia:The unsolved killings of 17 journalists has had a chilling effect on the work of Russia's press" for The Guardian.
