= Tetsuya Shiroo =

Former leader of Suishin-Kai (1947–2020)

- Born: 1947
- Died: January 22, 2020 (aged 72–73); Osaka Medical Prison, Osaka, Japan
- Organization: Suishin-kai
- Penalty: Death; commuted to life imprisonment

Tetsuya Shiroo (城尾 哲弥, Shiroo Tetsuya; 1947 – 22 January 2020) was the former leader of the Suishin-kai, a Nagasaki-based yakuza group affiliated with the Yamaguchi-gumi, the largest yakuza organization in Japan.

== Murder of Iccho Itoh ==
On April 17, 2007, Shiroo shot Iccho Itoh, the mayor of Nagasaki, who died early the next morning.

Shiroo's apparent motive for the assassination was a grudge over an insurance claim. City officials had refused to compensate him for a Yamaguchi-gumi vehicle that was damaged at a public works construction site in 2003. It was reported in the Japanese press that prior to the shooting, Shiroo had mailed a letter to TV Asahi outlining his grudges against the mayor and the city government. In addition to the insurance claim, Shiroo was also reportedly angry that a construction company linked to his gang had been denied a contract by the city government. He later told police that he had been planning the assassination since February. Shiroo approached Itoh at 7:50 pm outside his campaign office near Nagasaki Station, shooting him twice in the back with an American-made revolver. Local police quickly subdued and arrested Shiroo, who reportedly later told police that he had planned to commit suicide after killing the mayor. Shiroo was indicted by the Nagasaki District Public Prosecutor's office for murder, gun possession and obstruction of election campaigning. Two of Shiroo's associates, Hiromi Ogawa and Masaki Yamashita, were arrested for helping Shiroo plan the killing, but charges were later dropped due to insufficient evidence. Shiroo denied that he had told anyone of his plans to assassinate Itoh. Police sources stated that the killing was a result of this personal grudge, and was not authorized by the Yamaguchi-gumi leadership. After the mayor's death, Shiroo's gang, the Suishin-kai, announced that it would voluntarily disband.

== Legal proceedings and conviction ==
His trial began on January 22, 2008. Prosecutors sought capital punishment for him and he was sentenced to death on May 26, 2008. However, the Fukuoka High Court revoked the death sentence and sentenced him to life imprisonment on September 29, 2009. Shiroo died at Osaka Medical prison in 2020.

== See also ==
- Capital punishment in Japan
