= Inagawa Dam =

Coordinates: 35°41′30″N 137°44′21″E

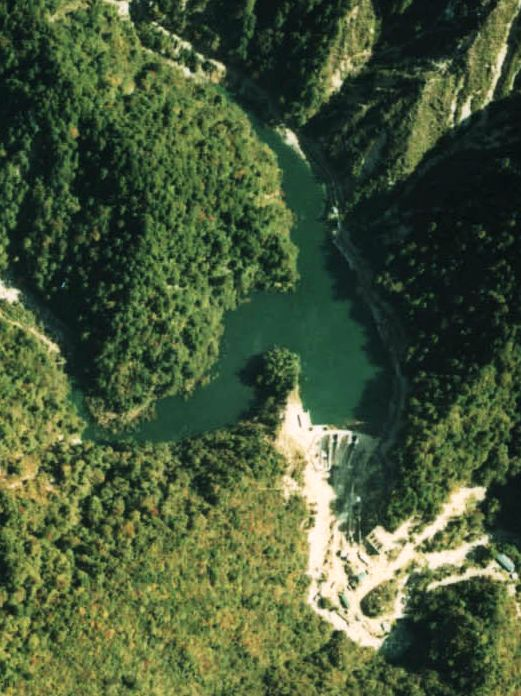
- Interactive map of Inagawa Dam
- Location: Ōkuwa, Nagano, Japan
- Construction began: 1974
- Opening date: 1977

Dam and spillways
- Height: 43 m (141 ft)
- Length: 105 m (344 ft)
- Dam volume: 55,000 m^{3}

Reservoir
- Total capacity: 803,000 m^{3}
- Catchment area: 76 km^{2}
- Surface area: 6 ha

Inagawa Dam (伊奈川ダム, Inagawa damu) is a dam in Ōkuwa, Nagano Prefecture, Japan, completed in 1977.

== See also ==
- List of dams and reservoirs in Japan
