= Ichiwa-kai =

1984-1989 Yakuza group

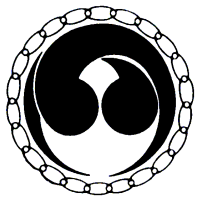
Daimon of Ichiwa-kai

The Ichiwa-kai (一和会) was a yakuza gang based in Osaka, Japan.

It was formed on June 13, 1984 when Hiroshi Yamamoto, a top lieutenant in the Yamaguchi-gumi, broke from that gang to form his own organization with over 10,000 members. The split stemmed from professional jealousy: Yamamoto had been seen as a contender for the role of kumicho, or Godfather, in the Yamaguchi-gumi, and was enraged when a rival, Masahisa Takenaka, was chosen.

In 1985, the Ichiwa-kai faction sent a team of hitmen to assassinate Takenaka at his mistress's home in Suita, Osaka. The killing of the Yamaguchi Godfather sparked a Kansai-wide yakuza war between the two groups in which over 20 gangsters were killed. The Yamaguchi-gumi eventually won what became known as the Yama-Ichi War, but it proved to be a Pyrrhic victory as many of its members were arrested in the process.

Most of the Ichiwa-kai defectors were eventually allowed to return to the Yamaguchi-gumi.

Yamamoto retired, and the Ichiwa-kai dissolved in March, 1989.
