= Yoshinori Watanabe =

Japanese yakuza boss (1941–2012)

- Born: January 5, 1941; Mibu, Tochigi prefecture, Japan
- Died: December 1, 2012 (age 71); Kobe, Japan
- Occupation: Yakuza
- Known for: 5th Kumicho of the Yamaguchi-gumi

Yoshinori Watanabe (渡辺 芳則, Watanabe Yoshinori; January 5, 1941 – December 1, 2012) was a yakuza, the fifth kumicho (chairman or Godfather) of the Yamaguchi-gumi, Japan's largest yakuza organization. He became kumicho in 1989. He was known for a more low-key approach than his predecessors, partly due to an anti-gang law passed in 1992. He retired in 2005.

== Yakuza career ==
Yoshinori Watanabe joined the Yamaken Gumi, a subgroup of the Yamaguchi Gumi Yakuza, after moving to Kobe. In 1960, the Yamaguchi Gumi was involved in a deadly gang war in which Yoshinori Watanabe proved himself to be violent but effective mediator in resolving disputes. His hard work and talent helped propel him upward in the ranks of the Yakuza underworld. In 1961, Watanabe spent a year in prison for possession of weapons, and he was again arrested in Osaka in the mid-70s for weapons possession. He became leader of Yamaken-gumi in 1982, and became the head of Yamaguchi-gumi in July 1989, at a ceremony in Kobe attended by over 100 affiliated gang leaders. At the time of his succession, which happened after a four-year gang war between the Yamaguchi-gumi and the Ichiwa-kai, Watanabe was the fifth head of the Yamaguchi-gumi.

During the first few years of being the 5th Generation Kumicho (Don, Chairman, or Godfather), Yoshinori Watanabe made very few changes to the Yamaguchi Gumi Yakuza organization. In the early 1990s, Yoshinori Watanabe started to make some radical changes in the Yamaguchi Gumi Yakuza organization. He successfully restructured the Yamaguchi Gumi in such a way that it increased the control the organization had over internal and external dilemmas; moreover, it made decreases to the police's ability to scrutinize all of the organization's activities. In order to make the Yamaguchi Gumi into a powerhouse of organized crime nationwide, Yoshinori Watanabe strengthened bonds with allies and formed new ones with rivals. By the year 2000, Yoshinori Watanabe had increased the size of the Yamaguchi Gumi by 5,000 gangsters and maintained offices in 43 of the 47 Japanese prefectures.

His home and headquarters in Kobe occupied the area of a city block, and was known to neighbours as "the castle." It was unscathed by the 1995 earthquake, and under Watanabe's order the Yamaguchi-gumi claimed to have given away 1 billion yen of goods and 20,000 free lunches to survivors, although there were accusations that the motives were not wholly altruistic. Police estimated that he received US$1 million a month from his aides in honoraria, and the full-time members of Yamaguchi-gumi had increased by one-third to 16,500 a decade after Watanabe took over. In November 2003, the Osaka High Court ordered that Watanabe and three others pay 80 million yen in damages for the killing of an off-duty policeman in 1995 by a Yamaguchi-gumi affiliate, and his appeal to the Supreme Court failed a year later. The rulings were historic in that they set a precedent in recognizing that a crime boss, though not directly involved in the criminal act, is responsible for the act if his subordinates are found guilty of that crime. These decisions specified what yakuza activities were considered business activities and that gang violence is “closely related with the business.” It was believed this new precedent would greatly affect the money-making ability of Yoshinori Watanabe, Yamaguchi Gumi, and other yakuza organizations. He retired from his position in July 2005, reportedly due to ill health.

== Accession to Kumicho ==
The 1980s was a turbulent time for the Yakuza organizations, the Yamaguchi Gumi that Yoshinori Watanabe belonged to was not excluded from this turmoil. Kazuo Taoka, the Third Generation Kumicho of the Yamaguchi Gumi, died of a heart attack in 1981. The heir apparent, Kenichi Yamamoto, died in 1982 of liver disease. Kazuo Taoka's widowed wife acted as Kumicho until she named Masahisa Takenaka to lead the Yamaguchi Gumi in 1984. Masahisa Takenaka's succession led to a violent division in the Yamaguchi Gumi and a violent gang war. Masahisa Takenaka was gunned down in 1985 by the Ichiwa-kai gang, a Yamaguchi Gumi splinter gang. Four weeks later, two Ichiwa-kai gangsters were killed at a bicycle track. The war between Yamaguchi Gumi and the splinter group killed more than 30 gang members and a few bystanders. This war would be known as the Yama-Ichi War. In 1989, Yoshinori Watanabe took the position of 5th Generation Kumicho of Yamaguchi Gumi and ended nearly ten years of violent power struggle within the largest yakuza organization. Yoshinori Watanabe's huge ceremony to commemorate accession was held at a local shrine and infused traditional and feudal aspects of the yakuza society. All the leadership of the Yamaguchi Gumi wore traditional Japanese clothing and carried fans. During the ceremony, Yochinori Watanabe and Kazuo Nakanishi, the then-acting boss of Yamaguchi and Watanabe's main rival, formally exchanged cups.

== Great Hanshin Earthquake ==
On January 17, 1995 a powerful earthquake struck Japan. Yoshinori Watanabe's house and headquarters, the Castle, seemed not to be damaged by the quake, but one of Yoshinori Watanabe's office buildings was destroyed. Yoshinori Watanabe ordered his affiliates to provide food and water to the needy, but it is believed that the yakuza forced businesses to provide them food and water at discounted price or even for free. After the quake, the Yamaguchi Gumi bought a lot of the land in Kobe for very cheap because many of the owners could not afford to pay for the reconstruction. The reconstruction of Kobe cost more than 120 billion dollars. Yamaguchi Gumi was active in the construction industry of Kobe before the earthquake. It is believed that the Yoshinori Watanabe was the largest beneficiary of the earthquake because of his organization's extensive links in the Kobe construction industry. Because of the nature of the business, it is very difficult to prosecute someone for illegal practices in the construction industry.

== Personal life ==
He was born in Tochigi Prefecture in 1941, and had five siblings. He moved to Tokyo after graduating from high school. While in Tokyo, Watanabe Yoshinori made noodles. After two years of making noodles, he moved to Kobe, where he joined the Yamaken Gumi, one of many gangs that are part of the Yamaguchi Gumi Yakuza. He was very private as kumicho, giving no media interviews. His interests were golf, weight-lifting, jogging, and Chinese history.

Preceded by (none)	Kaicho of Kenryu-kai; 1969?-1982	Succeeded by Kaneyoshi Kuwata
Preceded by Kenichi Yamamoto	Kumicho of Yamaken-gumi; 1982–1989	Succeeded by Kaneyoshi Kuwata
Preceded by Masahisa Takenaka	Kumicho of Yamaguchi-gumi; 1989–2005	Succeeded by Shinobu Tsukasa
