= Kazuo Taoka =

Japanese mob boss

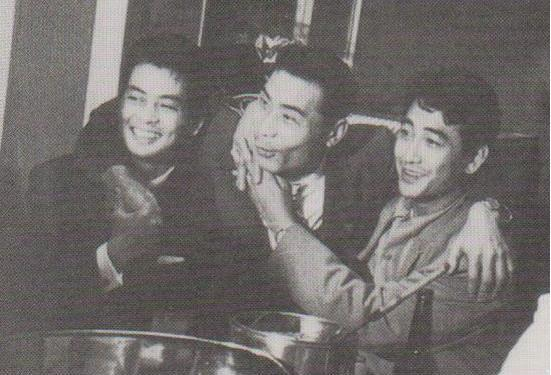
- From left to right, Mitsuru Ono, Kazuo Taoka, Kōji Tsuruta. 1952.
- Born: March 28, 1913; Higashimiyoshi, Tokushima, Japan
- Died: July 23, 1981 (aged 68); Amagasaki, Japan
- Spouse: Fumiko Taoka (m. 1944–1981)
- Relatives: Kitarō (son-in-law)

Kazuo Taoka (田岡 一雄, Taoka Kazuo; March 28, 1913 – July 23, 1981) was one of the most prominent yakuza godfathers.

Known as the "Godfather of Godfathers" and "The Japanese Godfather", Taoka was third kumicho of the Yamaguchi-gumi, Japan's largest yakuza organization, from 1946 to 1981.

== Early life ==
Taoka, an orphan, grew up as a young street fighter in Kobe under the guidance of Noboru Yamaguchi, the Yamaguchi-gumi's boss. He earned his lifelong nickname "Kuma" ("the Bear") because of his signature attack of clawing at an opponent's eyes.

== Career ==
Taoka was imprisoned for murder from 1937 to 1943 and assumed the role of kumicho three years later, at the age of 33. As World War II and the subsequent occupation of Japan wound down, however, more national focus would be given onto the internal criminal syndicates. Consequently, severe police crackdowns and arrests would be constantly imminent, making it a high cost venture for relatively low profit. Taoka realized that the economic activities in the back alleys would quickly come to a dead end, and a suggestion from a friend made Taoka start a full-fledged port cargo handling business instead.

In his time as boss, Taoka expanded the Yamaguchi-gumi from a small strikebreaking gang on the Kobe docks to the world's largest criminal syndicate, with over 10,000 members during its peak. Notoriously suspicious and wary of rival yakuza clans, he notably refused to join the Kanto-kai, an inter-yakuza confederation in 1963. In 1972, following a period of tension between both gangs, Taoka forged an alliance between the Yamaguchi-gumi and the Inagawa-kai at a sakazuki ceremony at his home.

Taoka survived a 1978 assassination attempt when he was shot in the back of the neck by a member of the Matsuda-gumi (松田組), a rival gang to the Yamaguchi-gumi, during a limbo dance exhibition at a nightclub in Kyoto. His attacker was found dead several weeks later in the woods near Kobe.

== Death ==
Taoka led the Yamaguchi-gumi until his death from a heart attack in 1981. His wife, Fumiko, briefly filled the gang's leadership role until a new kumicho, Masahisa Takenaka, was chosen in 1984.

== Personal life ==
From 1983 to 1990, Taoka's daughter Yuki (1964–) was married to Kitarō, a noted Japanese new-age musician. His son Mitsuru Taoka (1943–2012) was a producer of films in Japan and was married to actress Eiko Nakamura until her suicide at their home by gas poisoning in 1975.

Preceded by Noboru Yamaguchi	Kumicho of Yamaguchi-gumi; 1946-1981	Succeeded by Masahisa Takenaka
