= Yamaguchi-gumi =

Japanese organized crime (yakuza) group

- "Yamabishi" (山菱), the daimon of the Yamaguchi-gumi
- Founded: 1915; 111 years ago
- Founder: Harukichi Yamaguchi
- Founding location: Kobe, Japan
- Years active: 1915–present
- Territory: Primarily based in Kobe but has territory all over Japan, including in Nagoya, Tokyo and Hawaii, United States
- Membership (est.): 3,100 members 3,200 quasi-members
- Leader: Kenichi Shinoda
- Activities: Arms trafficking, assassinations, bid rigging, blackmail, bookmaking, contract killing, drug trafficking, extortion, fraud, human trafficking, illegal gambling, Internet pornography, loansharking, match fixing, money laundering, murder, prostitution, racketeering, securities fraud, sōkaiya, and infiltration of legitimate businesses
- Allies: Inagawa-kai; Soai-kai; Matsuba-kai; Kyōsei-kai; Aizukotetsu-kai; Toa-kai; Fukuhaku-kai; Gōda-ikka; Shinwa-kai
- Rivals: Kobe Yamaguchi-gumi; Kizuna-kai; Ikeda-gumi

The Sixth Yamaguchi-gumi (六代目山口組, Rokudaime Yamaguchi-gumi; Japanese: [ɾokɯdaime jamaɡɯt͡ɕi ɡɯmi]) is Japan's largest yakuza organization. It is named after its founder, Harukichi Yamaguchi. It originated as a loose labor union for dockworkers in Kobe before World War II.

Once one of the largest criminal organizations in the world, the group's membership has declined considerably since its peak in the 1960s. According to the National Police Agency, it had 3,100 active members at the end of 2025.

The Yamaguchi-gumi are among the world's wealthiest gangsters, acquiring billions of US dollars a year through extortion, gambling, prostitution, arms trafficking, drug trafficking, real estate and construction kickback schemes. They are also involved in stock market manipulation and Internet pornography.

The Yamaguchi-gumi has its headquarters in Kobe, but it operates all across Japan and has overseas operations. Its current kumichō (Boss), Shinobu Tsukasa, has declared an expansionist policy—even making inroads into Tokyo, traditionally not Yamaguchi territory.

== History ==
=== Relief support after disasters ===
Immediately after the Kobe earthquake of 1995, the Yamaguchi-gumi started a large-scale relief effort for the earthquake victims, helping with the distribution of food and supplies. This help was essential to the Kobe population, because official support was inconsistent and chaotic for several days.

The Yamaguchi-gumi also provided relief in the wake of the 2011 Tōhoku earthquake and tsunami by opening its offices to the public and sending supplies to affected areas.

=== Newsletter ===
In an effort to boost morale, the Yamaguchi-gumi launched an eight-page newsletter in July 2013. However, it was only distributed to full members. The publication bridges communication gaps and includes articles on the group's opinion and traditions, as well as columns on angling, with an editorial section written by Kenichi Shinoda.

=== Assassination of Iccho Itoh ===
On April 17, 2007, Tetsuya Shiroo, a senior ranking member of the Suishin-kai (an affiliated yakuza family to the Yamaguchi-gumi), assassinated Iccho Itoh, the mayor of Nagasaki, over an apparent dispute over damage done to Shiroo's car at a public works construction site. On May 26, 2008, Tetsuya Shiroo was sentenced to death. However, the Fukuoka High Court revoked the death sentence and sentenced him to life imprisonment on September 29, 2009.

=== Decline in membership ===
Yakuza membership has been steadily declining since the 1990s. According to the National Police Agency, the total number of registered gangsters fell 14% between 1991 and 2012, to 78,600. Of those, 34,900 were Yamaguchi-gumi members, a decline of 4% from 2010. Its membership had further declined by 2013, with an estimated 28,000 members, and dropped again to 23,400 members in 2014. By 2025, the group's membership had collapsed to 3,100, with another 3,200 affiliated members.

=== Split in 2015 ===
On August 27, 2015, Japanese police confirmed that powerful factions, including the Kobe-based Yamaken-gumi, the Osaka-based Takumi-gumi, and the Kyoyu-kai, broke away from the Yamaguchi-gumi and formed a new group called the Kobe Yamaguchi-gumi. Prior to the split, the organization consisted of seventy-two factions. This was the first major split since the forming of Ichiwa-Kai more than thirty years ago.

In April 2025, the Yamaguchi-gumi informed the Hyogo Prefectural Police of its intention to end its conflict with organizations such as the Kobe Yamaguchi-gumi, which had split from the Yamaguchi-gumi. The move is believed to be aimed at lifting its designation as a "Designated Specified Conflict-Related Organized Crime Group" (Tokutei kōsō shitei bōryokudan, 特定抗争指定暴力団), a status under which gatherings of five or more members or the use of offices can result in penalties. In the same month, wakagashira (underboss) Kiyoshi Takayama stepped down to become a sōdanyaku (advisor), and wakagashira-hosa (deputy underboss) Teruaki Takeuchi was promoted to wakagashira.

== Activities ==
On January 14, 2021, the Tokyo Metropolitan Police Department arrested Hiroki Sakata, a member of the Yamaguchi-gumi, for connection to a scam in 2018 where the damage was worth 60 million yen ($475,059 US dollars in 2022).

== Leadership ==
- 1st kumichō (1915–1925): Harukichi Yamaguchi
- 2nd kumichō (1925–1942): Noboru Yamaguchi, son of Harukichi Yamaguchi
- 3rd kumichō (1946–1981): Kazuo Taoka

When Taoka inherited the title of kumichō, it was merely a local family with only a few dozen members. It was Taoka who made Yamaguchi-gumi Japan's largest criminal organization. He urged his underlings to have legitimate businesses and allowed them to have their own families, which became quasi-subsidiary families of Yamaguchi-gumi. He also created a structural system in the family. Wakagashira were elected as underbosses to the kumichō and some powerful members were elected as wakagashira-hosa (deputy underbosses).

- 4th kumichō (1984–1985): Masahisa Takenaka

After the death of Taoka, the heir apparent, wakagashira Kenichi Yamamoto (kumichō of the Yamaken-gumi), was serving a prison sentence. He died of liver failure shortly afterward. Taoka's wife, Fumiko Taoka, stepped forward to fill the leadership void until a new kumichō could be selected by a council of eight top-level bosses. In 1984, the elders chose Masahisa Takenaka (kumichō of the Takenaka-gumi) to be the fourth kumichō of Yamaguchi-gumi. One of the other contenders, Hiroshi Yamamoto (kumichō of the Yamahiro-gumi), broke away from Yamaguchi-gumi with many of its powerful members and more than 3,000 of its soldiers to form the Ichiwa-kai. A bitter rivalry existed between the two groups, which led to an all-out war (the Yama-Ichi War) after the Ichiwa-kai's 1985 assassination of Takenaka and wakahashira Katsumasa Nakayama. During the war, acting-kumichō Kazuo Nakanishi (kumichō of the Nakanishi-gumi) and wakagashira Yoshinori Watanabe (kumichō of the Yamaken-gumi) briefly took the leadership role until 1989.

- 5th kumichō (1989–2005): Yoshinori Watanabe

The Yama-Ichi War ended with the retirement of Hiroshi Yamamoto, which was arbitrated by one of the most respected bosses, Seijo Inagawa. After that, the clan elected wakagashira Yoshinori Watanabe as 5th kumichō of the organization. Masaru Takumi (kumichō of Takumi-gumi) was elected as wakagashira. He was so powerful and respected within the organization that his influence overshadowed that of kumichō to some extent.

Watanabe retired to private life—uncommon in yakuza circles, as bosses usually do not retire.

- 6th kumichō (2005–present): Shinobu Tsukasa (real name: Kenichi Shinoda)

In 1997, then-powerful wakagashira Masaru Takumi was assassinated by underlings of then-wakagashira-hosa (deputy underboss) Taro Nakano. After this assassination, they were unable to choose a new wakagashira for more than eight years. As a result, leadership of the organization became weaker. In 2005, wakagashira-hosa Shinobu Tsukasa (then kumichō of the Hirota-gumi) was chosen as new wakagashira and shortly afterward, in August 2005, Tsukasa inherited the position of the 6th kumichō of the Yamaguchi-gumi.

Under Tsukasa's leadership, the 6th Yamaguchi-gumi has resumed expansion. Kiyoshi Takayama, kumichō of the Kodo-kai, was elected as wakagashira. They absorbed the Tokyo-based gang Kokusui-kai, acquiring lucrative turf in the capital. Tsukasa was imprisoned in December 2005 for illegal gun possession, and was released in April 2011 after serving nearly six years in jail.

== Sanctions ==
In February 2012 the U.S. Treasury Department announced a freeze on American-owned assets controlled by the organization and its top two leaders. The Obama administration imposed sanctions on the Yamaguchi-gumi as one of four key transnational organized crime groups, along with the Brothers' Circle from Russia, the Camorra from Italy, and Los Zetas from Mexico.

== In popular culture ==
- The main antagonist of the 1991 martial arts film The Godfather's Daughter Mafia Blues, Kuyama (played by Ken Lo), is the current kumichō of the Yamaguchi-gumi after the death of his father Tetsuya, who was the previous head of the syndicate. Unlike his father (who was known as a pacifist), Kuyama is an arrogant, greedy, and reckless leader.
- In Marvel's Earth-616, the Yamaguchi-gumi are enemies of the Shogun Warriors and the X-Men's Wolverine. The Yamaguchi-gumi have two known oyabuns in Earth-616: Maikeru Mishu (who is responsible for trying to steal and control the Shogun Warriors) and Shinji Kizaki (who becomes Wolverine's enemy after he defeats one of Kizaki's mercenaries).
- The Yamaguchi-gumi are one of the main antagonists of Hitman 2: Silent Assassin. In the game, the Yamaguchi-gumi is led by Masahiro Hayamoto and his son Masahiro Hayamoto Jr., and both are priority targets for Agent 47.
- In Tom Clancy's Rainbow Six: Take-Down – Missions in Korea, the Yamaguchi-gumi is involved in a bloody gang war with the Ikeshita-gumi (a powerful yakuza syndicate that serves as one of the main antagonists of the game).
