= Kakuji Inagawa =

Japanese yakuza boss

Kakuji Inagawa (稲川 角二 Inagawa Kakuji), also known as Seijō Inagawa (稲川 聖城 Inagawa Seijō; November 1914 – December 22, 2007) was a Japanese yakuza boss best known for founding the Inagawa-kai, Japan's third-largest yakuza syndicate.

Inagawa, son of a Meiji University graduate who fell on hard times, never attended school. He was recruited into the yakuza as an enforcer when he was a teenage judo student.

After serving in World War II, Inagawa formed the Inagawa-gumi, the predecessor to the current Inagawa-kai, in Atami, Shizuoka, in 1949.

Inagawa was regarded as an "elder statesman" of the yakuza, and a peacemaker skilled in settling disputes between rival gangs. In the early 1960s, he headed the short-lived Kanto-kai, a federation of Kantō region gangs organized by Yoshio Kodama. That organization's rightist philosophy was summed up by Inagawa: "We bakuto cannot walk in broad daylight", he said. "But if we unite and form a wall to stop Communism, we can be of service to our nation."
