= Inagawa-kai =

Japanese mafia group

- The daimon of Inagawa-kai
- Founded: 1949
- Founder: Kakuji Inagawa
- Founding location: Shizuoka, Japan
- Years active: 1949–present
- Territory: Tokyo
- Membership: 1,600 members 1,000 quasi-members
- Leader: Kazuya Uchibori

The Inagawa-kai (稲川会) is the third largest of Japan's yakuza groups, with approximately 1,600 members as of 2025. It is based in the Kantō region, and was one of the first yakuza organizations to begin operating overseas.

== History ==
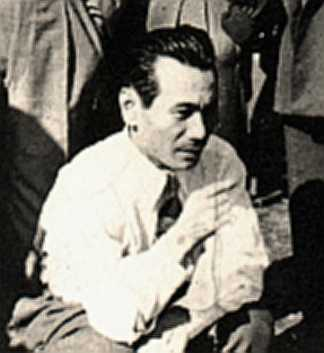
Tatsuo Deguchi (b. 1923 in Miyazaki – 1955), an important underboss in the early Inagawa history

The Inagawa-kai was founded in Atami, Shizuoka in 1949 as the Inagawa-gumi (稲川組) by Kakuji Inagawa. Most of its members were drawn from the bakuto (traditional gamblers), and illegal gambling has long been the clan's main source of income. It has also expanded into such fields as drug trafficking, blackmail, extortion, and prostitution.

The Inagawa-gumi was renamed the Inagawa-kai in 1972. After Kakuji Inagawa, the gang was led by Susumu Ishii, who led it to unprecedented financial prosperity during the 1980s Japanese bubble economy. At one point the clan's assets were estimated to be over $1.5 billion. After Ishii's death in 1990, Inagawa's son Toi Inagawa took over as kumicho and led the clan until his death in May 2005. Yoshio Tsunoda took up the mantle in 2006, heading the clan until his death in February 2010.

The Inagawa-kai quietly helped to provide relief in the wake of the 2011 Tōhoku earthquake and tsunami by sending supplies to affected areas. As a whole, the group shipped over 100 tons of supplies, including instant ramen, bean sprouts, paper diapers, batteries, flashlights, tea and drinking water, to the Tōhoku region.

== Key persons ==
Inagawa-kai's renowned figures in the 20th century include Tatsuo Deguchi (known as the "Moroccan Tatsu" or "Tatsu of Morocco"), Kingo Yoshimizu, Kijin Inoue, Takamasa Ishii, Haruki Sho, and Kiichiro Hayashi.

== Leadership ==
In April 2025, Jirō Kiyota, the former fifth kaichō (会長, chairman) and then-current sōsai (総裁, supreme advisor), died of illness. As a result, Kazuya Uchibori became the leader of the Inagawa-kai in both name and reality as its sixth kaichō.

- 1st kaicho: Seijo Inagawa (real name: Kakuji Inagawa)
- 2nd kaicho: Takamasa Ishii (real name: Susumu Ishii)
- 3rd kaicho: Yūkō Inagawa (real name: Toi Inagawa)
- 4th kaicho: Yoshio Tsunoda
- 5th kaicho: Jiro Kiyota (Real name: Shin Byong-Kyu)
- 6th kaicho: Kazuya Uchibori (Real name: Kazuo Uchibori)

== In popular culture ==
- In the 2010 movie Predators, one of the main characters is a yakuza enforcer known as Hanzo (played by Louis Ozawa Changchien) who is revealed to be a high-ranking member of Inagawa-kai.
- In the popular tabletop role-playing game Shadowrun, the kaicho (boss/head/oyabun) of Inagawa-kai in the Shadowrun universe is Michizane Oi, a notorious Japanese elf and yakuza gangster and son of a powerful executive, Samba Oi, the chairman of the board of Mitsuhama Computer Technologies (or MCT), one of the largest keiretsus in Japan.
- In Hitman 2: Silent Assassin, one of the characters, Tanaka Kusahana, is a high-ranking member of Inagawa-kai (saiko-komon or senior advisor).
- In the video game Terra Invicta, Inagawa-kai is one of many organizations the player can recruit for their faction.
