= Yellow economic circle =

System of classifying Hong Kong businesses

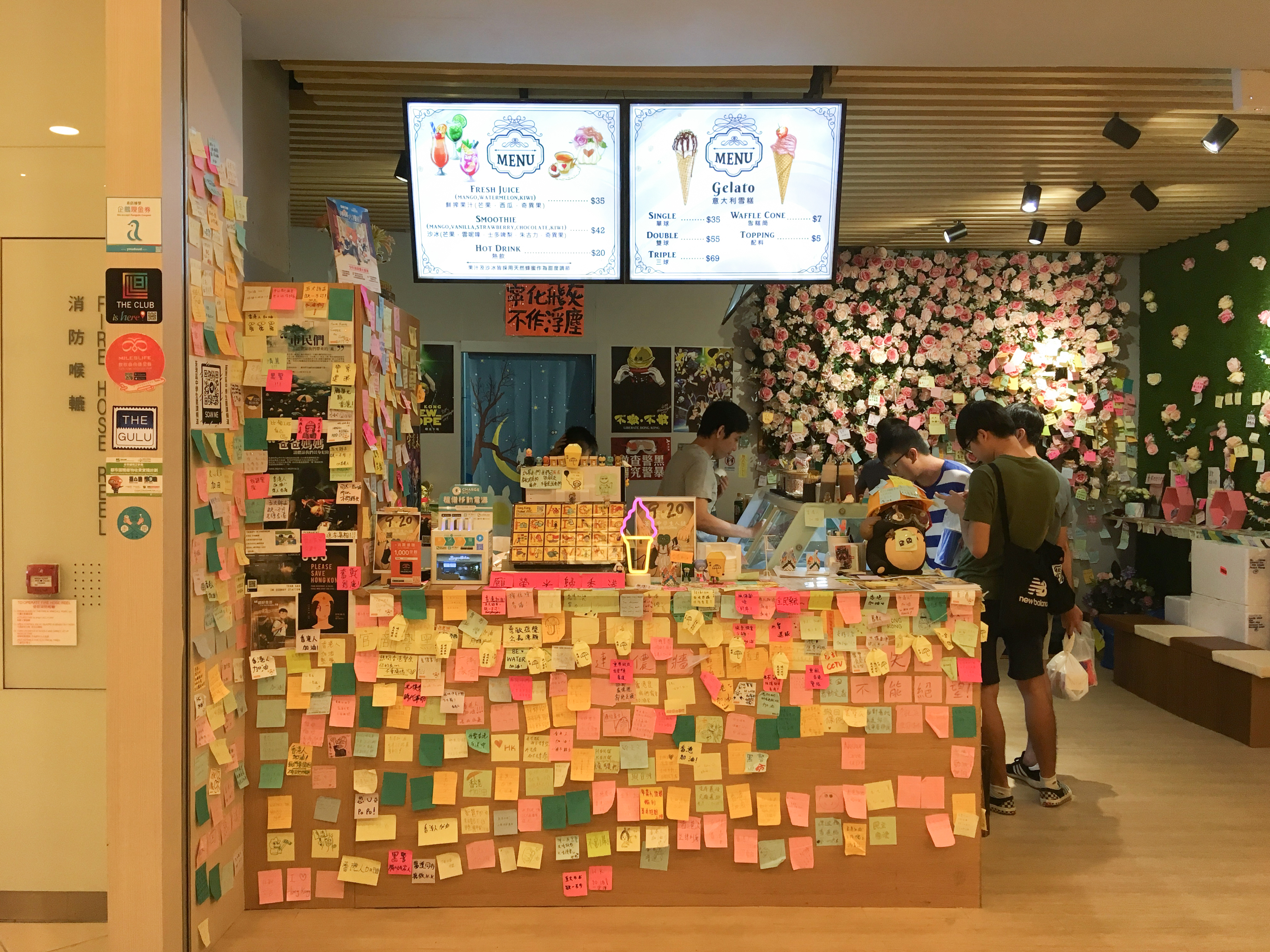
- A "yellow shop" featuring a Lennon Wall and posters supporting protesters
- Traditional Chinese: 黃色經濟圈
- Simplified Chinese: 黄色经济圈
Transcriptions
Standard Mandarin
- Hanyu Pinyin: huángsè jīngjì quān
Yue: Cantonese
- Yale Romanization: wòhngsīk gīngjai hyūn
- Jyutping: wong4sik1 ging1zai3 hyun1

Anti-communist economic circle
- Traditional Chinese: 反共經濟圈
- Simplified Chinese: 反共经济圈
Transcriptions
Standard Mandarin
- Hanyu Pinyin: fǎngòng jīngjì quān
Yue: Cantonese
- Yale Romanization: fáanguhng gīngjai hyūn
- Jyutping: faan2gung6 ging1zai3 hyun1

The yellow economic circle, also known as the yellow economy, was a form of consumer activism in Hong Kong, in which businesses are classified based on their support or opposition to the 2019–2020 protests in the city. It was created by protesters to enable dollar voting and support like-minded businesses, sustain the livelihoods of pro-democracy business owners, create job opportunities for supporters of the movement, and reduce local dependence on businesses that are connected to the Chinese Communist Party. Local political analysts suggested that the yellow economic circle could have increased votes for the pro-democracy camp in the Catering, Wholesale, and Retail functional constituency in the later postponed 2020 legislative election.

The passing of the Hong Kong national security law on 30 June 2020 led to a cooling of the movement, as pro-democracy businesses distanced themselves from the yellow economic circle due to fears of persecution under the new law.

== Origins ==
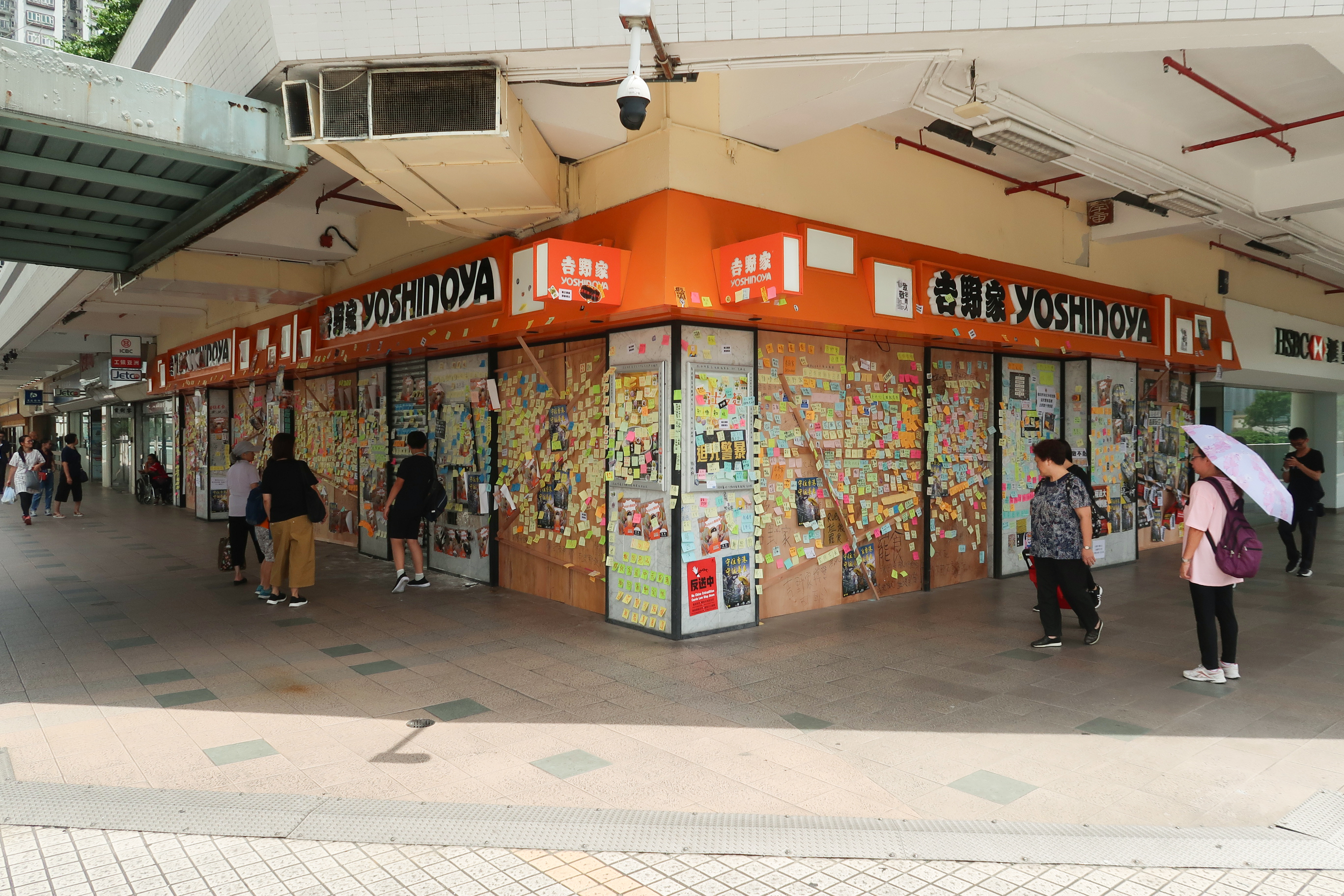
A Yoshinoya restaurant in Sha Tin, covered in post-it notes following the company's decision to fire employees over a satirical advertisement.

In July 2019, Yoshinoya, a Japanese fast food chain, created a Facebook advertisement mocking local police for removing notes from a Lennon Wall. The advertisement was taken down shortly thereafter, and the company's Hong Kong branch announced that it had fired the employees who created the post. The decision prompted supporters of the protesters to boycott Yoshinoya.

In the same month, a captain from Cathay Pacific made an announcement reassuring his passengers that the airport protests were peaceful and orderly. He ended with a few words in Cantonese, saying: "Keep it up, Hongkongers! Be careful and stay safe." (Chinese: 香港人加油，萬事小心) Soon after, the captain was reported to have left the airline, but it was unclear whether he resigned or was fired. Cathay Pacific has since been criticised for alleged political bias.

Following these incidents, citizens supporting the protests developed their own economic circle by boycotting blue shops and solely patronising yellow shops. Several smartphone apps, such as "和你eat" and "WhatsGap," were developed to help citizens identify and avoid spending money at shops with opposing political views.

Protestors developed the slogan "Refurbish the black, embellish the red, boycott the blue, support the yellow shops" after the 2019 Yuen Long mob attack, which was to be interpreted as "Vandalise the shops related to gangsters who attacked protesters, draw graffiti on state-owned shops and banks, boycott the shops that support the police and the government, spend more in pro-democracy shops."

== Classification ==
"Yellow shops" are businesses which supported protesters through direct action or financial support. This includes businesses which participated in general strikes, donated money to legal funds for protesters such as the 612 Fund and the Spark Alliance, donated food or protective gear to protesters, or set up a Lennon Wall for customers to leave Post-it Notes with messages of support for the protests.

Proponents of the yellow economic circle frequent "yellow shops" and boycott "blue shops", the latter supporting the Hong Kong Police Force. Businesses affiliated with ("red shops") or owned by ("black shops") the Chinese Communist Party are also targets of boycotts and vandalism by protesters, which has led to the use of the alternate name anti-communist economic circle. Politically neutral businesses are labelled "green shops". Yellow shops that have supported pro-democracy protesters since the 2014 Umbrella Movement are sometimes referred to as "golden shops".

== Methods ==
=== Online platforms ===
After the 5 August 2019 general strike in Hong Kong, several mobile apps and websites were developed to identify the political stance of shops and restaurants. These online platforms provide guidance to the supporters of the yellow economic circle, allowing them to identify and patronise nearby yellow shops, as well as avoid blue and red shops. Some of the platforms use a crowd-sourcing strategy to gather information on the political stances of shops, where the users can collectively determine the political stance of a certain shop by voting.

=== Promotional campaigns ===
Netizens supporting the yellow economic circle have organised promotional campaigns to encourage the patronage of yellow shops. Organisers typically promote the campaigns through forums and chat groups, encouraging supporters of the yellow economic circle to shop at yellow shops more frequently during the campaign periods. Long lines are often seen outside popular yellow shops during the campaigns. The following is a list of some notable campaigns:

- Day of Thanks (全民黃店感謝日) on 10 October 2019
- Shopping Spree Day (爆買黃店日) on 26 October 2019
- Golden Week (五一黃金週) from 1 May 2020 to 7 May 2020

==== Chinese New Year Fairs ====
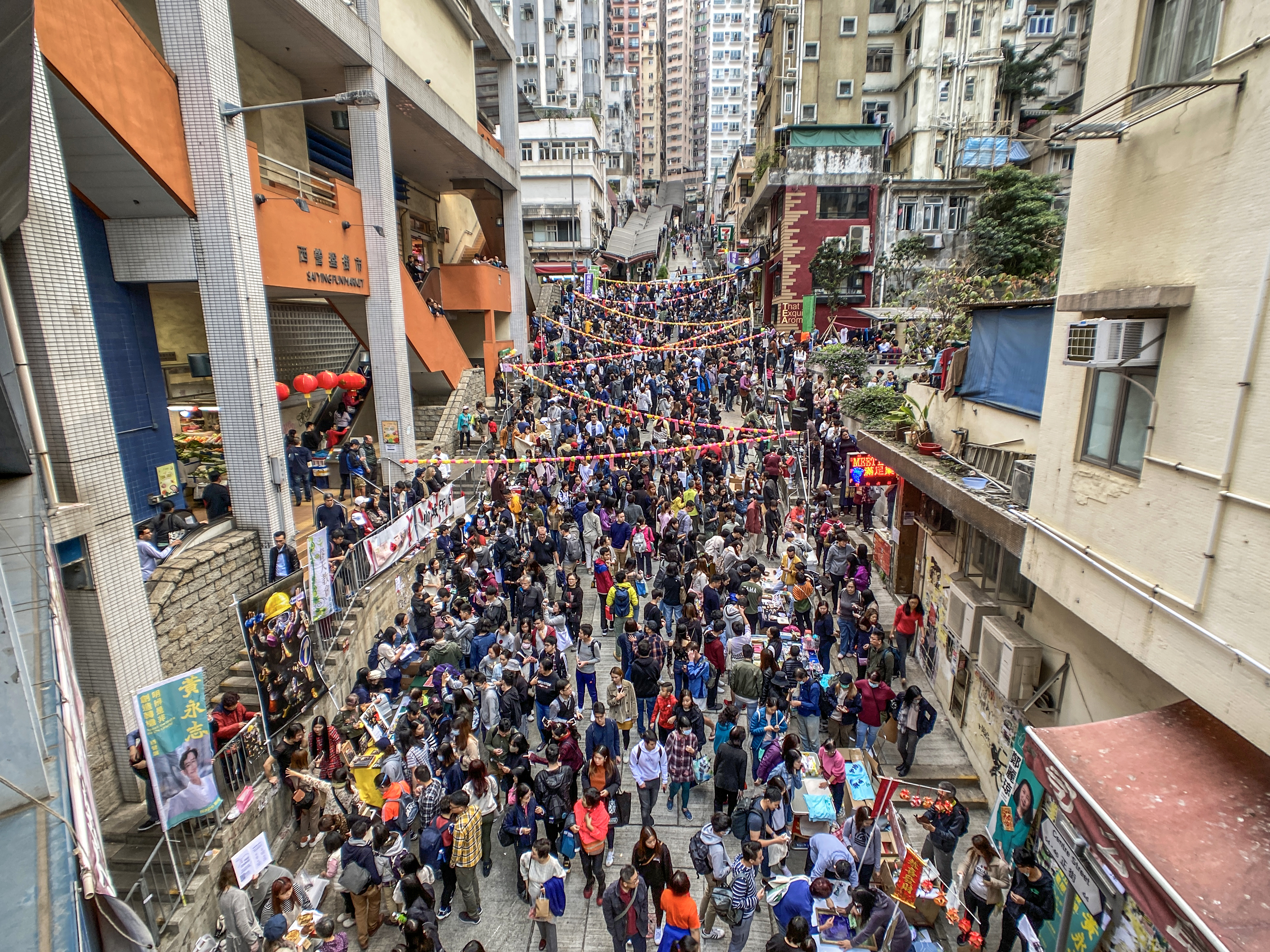
The wo lei siu of the Central and Western District

The Chinese New Year Fair is a traditional fair held annually a few days before Lunar New Year, typically organised by the Hong Kong government. After the government announced on 7 November 2019 that there would not be any dry good stalls at the 2020 fairs, a group of netizens and pro-democracy district councillors organised independent fairs called "wo lei siu" (Chinese: 和你宵; lit. 'our evening'). The organisers aimed to provide a platform for yellow shops to promote their products and services, while at the same time encouraging citizens to boycott the fairs organised by the government.

However, the government refused to approve the wo lei siu organisers' venue applications, forcing them to host the fairs in a different form or at a smaller venue. After the pro-Beijing political organisation District Council Observers accused Kwai Chung's wo lei siu of promoting political propaganda, the Housing Department cancelled the venue booking three days before the wo lei siu was scheduled to start. As for the wo lei siu of Central and Western District, the Food and Environmental Hygiene Department refused to issue a Temporary Places of Public Entertainment License, even though activities of a similar scale have been held in the same venue during past Lunar New Year celebrations without any opposition from the government. In response to this setback, a group of Central and Western district councillors announced that they would set up street counters separately on the original venue, hosting stall games and performances. Several other independent fairs have faced similar opposition from the government.

=== Cross-promotions ===
Yellow shops close to each other have occasionally joined to organise cross-promotions. For instance, in October 2019, when the famous yellow drink shop Kingyo in Yuen Long was facing a potential shutdown, its neighbouring yellow restaurant Watergate Chicken Rice announced that it would stop selling drinks, and that customers could instead show their receipt from Watergate Chicken Rice at Kingyo to get ten per cent discount. This promotion successfully increased Kingyo's sales and saved it from closing.

It is also common for multiple yellow shops in the same region to form alliances, offering support and cross-promoting one another. For example, yellow shops in Mong Kok have formed the "Small Mong Kok Alliance," which offers customers a yellow discount card to shop at other members’ outlets. Similar alliances are seen in the Central and Western District, Tai Po District and Kwun Tong District, with the yellow shops employing various promotion strategies, such as stamp cards and VIP cards.

=== Boycotts of blue shops ===
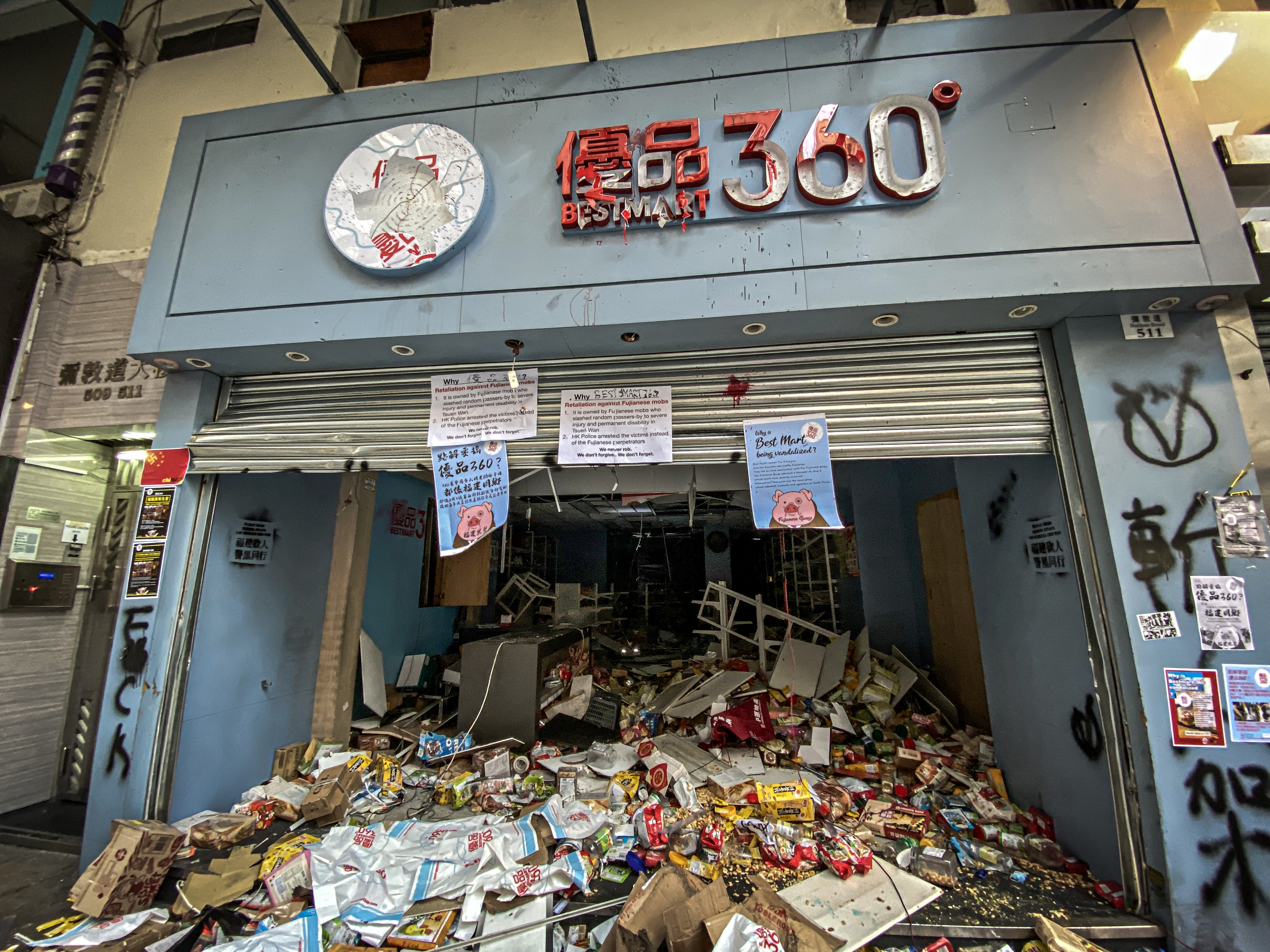
Trashed Best Mart 360 branch

Businesses that have openly voiced opposition to the pro-democracy movement are labelled "blue shops" and face large-scale boycotts from supporters of the yellow economic circle. Some of the more prominent blue shops include Maxim's Caterer, Best Mart 360, and Yoshinoya. Maxim's has become one of the most widely boycotted restaurant chains in Hong Kong ever since 11 September 2019, when Annie Wu, the daughter of the company's founder, called for the expulsions of faculty and students who boycott, and publicly denounced the Hong Kong protests at the United Nations Human Rights Council. The revenue of Maxim's Caterer dropped drastically after the incident due to a widespread boycott by protesters. Best Mart 360, a chain store that sells snacks, saw a similarly rapid decline in profit after protesters started a boycott campaign due to the company's relationship with the triad Fujian gang, which has assaulted protesters on several occasions.

Boycotts against blue shops are not limited to the retail and catering industries; corporations in various trades such as the media and transportation industries have also been labelled blue and subsequently boycotted. TVB, one of the four free-to-air television broadcasters in Hong Kong, has been accused of selectively reporting the economic disruption caused by the protests while down-playing police violence and the underlying political frustration. As a result, netizens launched several campaigns against the broadcaster, such as writing to businesses to persuade them to withdraw their ads airing on TVB. Many businesses have subsequently withdrawn or postponed their advertising campaigns with TVB.

=== Attacks on blue, red, and black shops ===
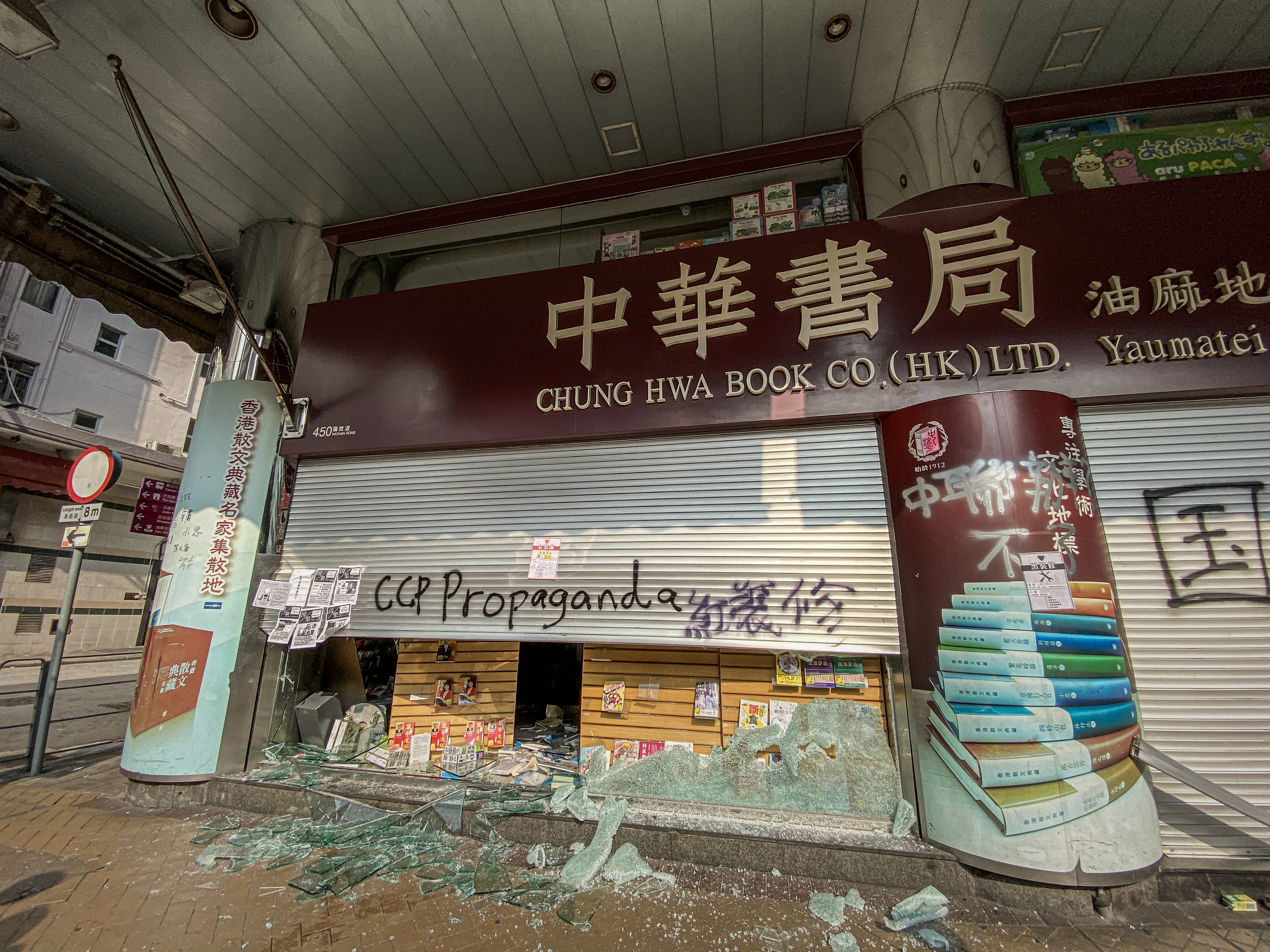
Vandalised Zhonghua bookstore

Some shops that are considered pro-Beijing were physically damaged during protests in 2019. Chinese Communist Party-affiliated businesses, labelled "red shops" by protesters, and Chinese Communist Party-owned businesses, labelled "black shops", were frequent targets of vandalism. Mainland Chinese bank branches had their ATMs destroyed and interiors vandalised. Other mainland Chinese brand stores were set alight and had their windows smashed. A fashion chain whose founder was allegedly sympathetic to the Hong Kong Police Force was also targeted. Some "blue shops" have also been attacked with molotov cocktails. Maxim-owned restaurants and Starbucks branches were also ransacked.

== Use abroad ==
The concept of the yellow economic circle has been adopted by pro-democracy supporters in Hong Kong's diaspora communities, most notably in Canada and the United States. In late 2019, a Hong Kong Canadian Facebook group published a crowdsourced list of yellow and blue shops in Metro Vancouver. Leo Shin, an associate professor of History and Asian Studies and the Convenor of the Hong Kong Studies Initiative at the University of British Columbia, commented that such lists could create "a great deal of division within the Chinese communities [in Canada]," and so the two opposing political camps should instead "promote coming together in one form or another."

== Impact of the national security law ==
After the Hong Kong national security law was passed on 30 June 2020 and following the disbandment of Demosistō, some pro-democracy businesses began distancing themselves from the yellow economic circle due to fears of persecution under the new law. Businesses reportedly removed promotional posters from their storefronts and anti-establishment remarks from their official social media accounts.

== Effectiveness ==
Kay Lam, a political analyst, stated that the yellow economic circle is the result of people's political awakening triggered by the social movement. Through boycotting businesses affiliated with the Chinese Communist Party and supporting local entrepreneurs, a counter-political pressure will be generated that compels business owners to think carefully before participating in pro-government propaganda. According to the owner of a dried seafood shop, by setting up a local economic circle, Hong Kong businesses can prove to others that they do not need help from the Chinese Communist Party. Political scientist Kenneth Chan commented that the yellow economic circle is "a form of protest in daily life which breeds a sense of self-determination and solidarity against the government". Others argued that " consumer activism has helped revive small businesses, which have more autonomy to express their political opinions."

At least 71 restaurants or bakeries from Maxim's Catering Group were forced to suspend their operations for five or more days in a row in November 2019.

Economists have stated that the yellow circle is unlikely to impact Hong Kong's main industries of finance, tourism, trading and logistics, which currently are strongly linked to mainland China.

== Reactions ==
=== Positive ===
Joshua Wong, the secretary general of Demosistō, stated that the yellow economic circle may be a chance for Hong Kong to restructure its economy. He pointed out that Hong Kong relies highly on the consumption of luxury products by mainland Chinese tourists, which may be unhealthy for the Hong Kong economy in the long term. However, the yellow economic circle may restructure the economy of Hong Kong to focus more on local consumption.

Alan Leong, the chairperson of the Civic Party, commented that the yellow economic circle had great economic potential and contributed significantly to the 2019–2020 Hong Kong protests, for example, promoting pro-democracy parties' campaigns in the lead up to the later popstponed 2020 Legislative Council election.

=== Negative ===
Edward Yau Tang-wah, the Commerce and Economic Development Secretary of Hong Kong, criticised the yellow economic circle by doubting whether the economy could last if it continued. A pro-Beijing Hong Kong businessman, Shih Wing-ching, also mentioned that the yellow economic circle is "not feasible" and will further divide Hong Kong society, without creating any economic benefits. Newspaper Ta Kung Pao compared the yellow economic circle to Nazi practices and hatred of the mainland.

The People's Daily, the official newspaper of the Central Committee of the Chinese Communist Party, also condemned the yellow economic circle. The newspaper claimed that it undermines citizens' rights to choose what they want to eat and buy, and at the same time, spreads more hatred in Hong Kong.

Some yellow restaurants have been criticised for their refusal to serve Mandarin speakers (except those from Taiwan) during the COVID-19 pandemic. From January to March 2020, the Equal Opportunities Commission reported nearly 600 inquiries and complaints about restaurants and other businesses refusing to serve Mandarin speakers and people from mainland China, a trend that analysts believe to be partly due to Hong Kong's political environment as a result of the protests.

== See also ==
- Community-based economics
- Critical consumerism
- Ethical consumerism
- Dollar voting
- Identity economics
