= Manhattan Hill =

Housing estate in Lai Chi Kok, Hong Kong

Coordinates: 22°20′06″N 114°08′33″E

- 曼克頓山
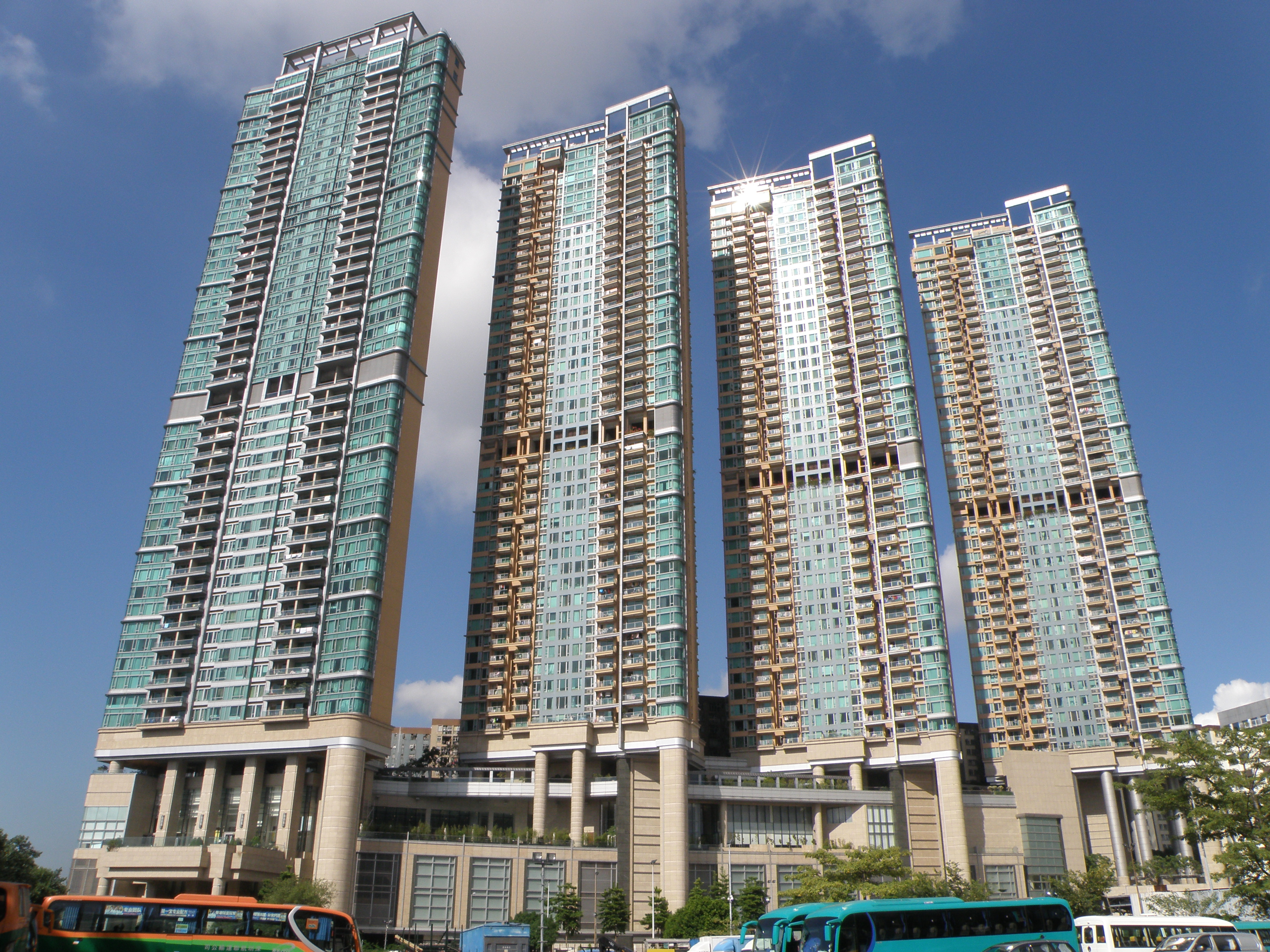
- The south facade of Manhattan Hill
- Interactive map of the Manhattan Hill area

General information
- Status: Completed
- Type: Residential
- Location: 1 Po Lun Street, Lai Chi Kok, Hong Kong
- Opening: 2007; 19 years ago

Height
- Roof: 193 m (633 ft) (Towers 1-2); 186 m (610 ft) (Towers 4,5 and 6)

Technical details
- Floor count: 51

Design and construction
- Architect: Ronald Lu and Partners
- Developer: Sun Hung Kai Properties

Manhattan Hill (Chinese: 曼克頓山), or 1 Po Lun Street, is a 198-metre-tall luxury residential skyscraper in the Lai Chi Kok district of Kowloon in Hong Kong. (Note: The complex consists of four towers, which only one rises to 198 metres (650 ft), the other three towers rise to 186 metres (610 ft)). It was completed in January 2007, and designed by Ronald Lu and Partners.

The building adjoins Mei Foo Sun Chuen, the first large scale private housing estate in Hong Kong and the headquarters of the Kowloon Motor Bus (KMB), the largest bus operator in Hong Kong by its fleet and route size. The site was previously used by Kowloon Motor Bus.

The skyscraper has won the following awards:

- Leisure and Cultural Services Department Green Award – Merit Award
- HKIS Property Marketing Award – Top Ten Property Layouts Awards
- 30th Anniversary Award for Achievement in Marketing Excellence - Bronze Award

== History ==
Prior to the construction of Manhattan Hill and the bus depot, the site served as the brewing plant of Oriental Brewery from 1908 to 1912 until its liquidation, before being acquired by KMB in 1965 for 40 years. Its relocation in 2002 partially gave way for the site of Manhattan Hill, as well as a highly-dense quadplex residential development to the west nicknamed the "Four Little Dragons (四小龍)".

== Architecture ==
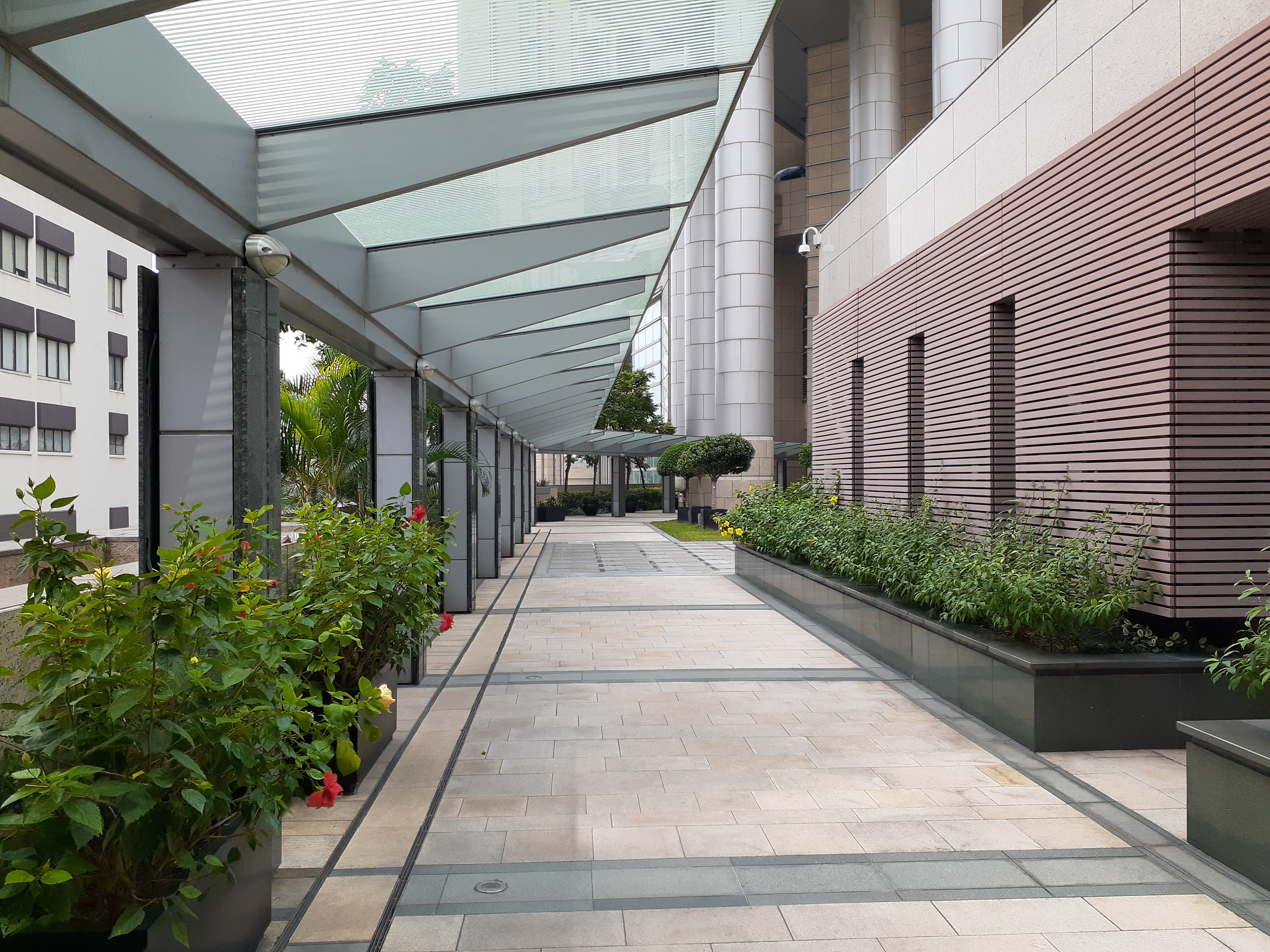
A section of the terraced walkway

The buildings were designed by Ronald Lu and Partners. The four towers are aligned 45 degrees to the east in order to optimise views of Victoria Harbour and to maximise sunlight. There is an outdoor and covered terrace connecting all four towers. A section of the terrace on the second floor is a public open space that opens daily from 7 AM to 11 PM.

The clubhouses, 'Jag' and 'JAG1609' opened in September of 2007 with a total floor space of 150,000 square feet. Jag is three-stories tall and features an atrium with ivory walls and glass chandeliers. Amenities include a restaurant, home theatre, two pools, a gym, music room, etc. JAG1609 is exclusively available for residents of Towers 1 and 2. The construction of the clubhouses cost around $300 million HKD, or $38 million USD.

== Structure ==
Name	Chinese name	Height (m)	Height (ft)	Floor count
Manhattan Hill 1-2	曼克頓山第一至二座	193	650	51
Manhattan Hill 3	曼克頓山第三座	186	650	49
Manhattan Hill 5	曼克頓山第五座	186	650	49
Manhattan Hill 6	曼克頓山第六座	186	650	49

== Controversies and incidents ==
Early residents from Manhattan Hill, as well as residents of the broader Sham Shui Po / Lai Chi Kok community complained of pungent smells as a result of southerly winds blowing foul odor from the West Kowloon reclamation project. With the completion of the reclamation phase of West Kowloon Cultural District and government sewage cleanups in the nearby Victoria Harbour, the odor has subsided.

On 6 July, 2018, a 39-year old woman was arrested for stealing a net worth of $720,000 HKD via forced entry into a resident's car inside the Manhattan Hill carpark.

== Midtown Manhattan ==
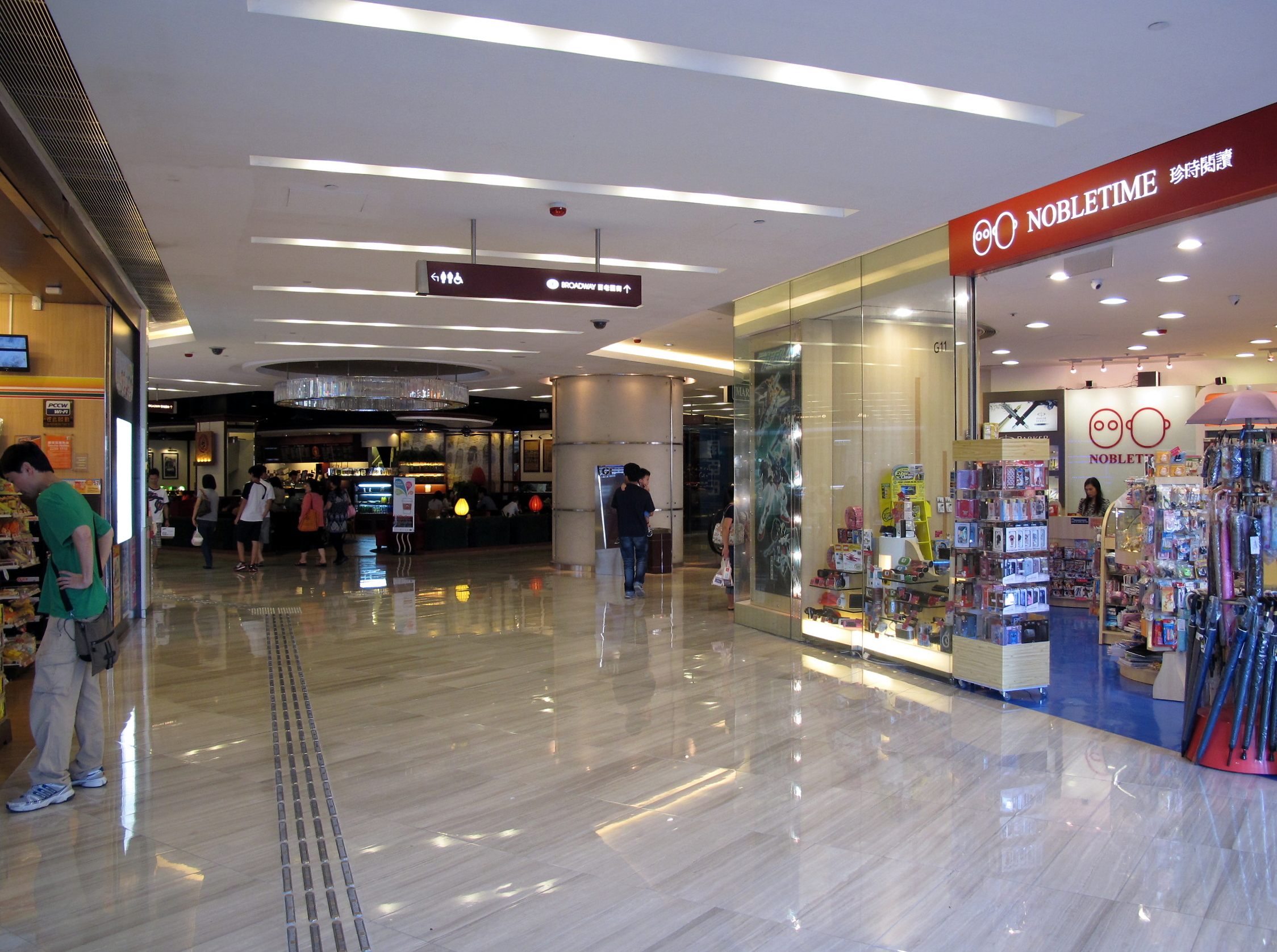
Manhattan Midtown in 2011

Owned by Lai Chi Kok Commercial Properties Limited (LCKCP), a subsidiary of Transport International Limited, the complex features a shopping centre with retail, restaurants and services, most notably including:

G/F: 7-Eleven, Pacific Coffee, Genki Sushi

1/F: 759 Store,SF Express

== See also ==
- List of tallest buildings in Hong Kong
- Mei Foo Sun Chuen
