= Best Mart 360 =

Hong Kong snack store

- Company type: Public
- Traded as: SEHK: 2360
- Industry: Food retailing
- Founded: 2013; 13 years ago
- Headquarters: 14/F, SML Tower; 165 Hoi Bun Road; Kwun Tong, Kowloon; Hong Kong
- Number of locations: 167 stores in 3 regions: Hong Kong: 159; Macau: 7; China: 1; (2023)
- Area served: Hong Kong; Macau
- Key people: Hui Chi Kwan, CEO; Lin Tsz Fung; Hui Ngai-fan
- Number of employees: 723 (2019)
- Website: bestmart360.com

Best Mart 360
- Traditional Chinese: 優品360
- Simplified Chinese: 优品360
- Literal meaning: Excellent Product 360
Transcriptions
Standard Mandarin
- Hanyu Pinyin: Yōu Pǐn 360
Yue: Cantonese
- Jyutping: jau1 ban2 360

Best Mart 360 (Chinese: 優品360) is a chain store in Hong Kong selling snacks and non-perishable groceries. At December 2023, the company operated 167 stores.

Best Mart 360 was founded in 2013 by Lin Tsz Fung, Hui Chi-kwan and Hui Ngai-fan, with its first store in Sheung Shui. It initially targeted tourists, though it refocused to Hong Kong residents following a decline in tourists visiting Hong Kong in 2016. Its main direct competitor is 759 Store. The company was listed on the Hong Kong Stock Exchange in January 2019. In 2023, China Merchants Hoi Tung Trading, wholly owned by Mainland state-owned enterprise China Merchants Group, took a 49% stake in the company.

Hui Chi-kwan has been CEO of the company since 2015.

The Securities and Futures Commission completed an enquiry into the ownership of Best Mart 360 in June 2019, finding that the company's shareholding was highly concentrated. As at 23 May 2019, the top 20 shareholders held 95.77% of the company's shares, of which 75% were held by controlling shareholder Long Ease Holdings Limited, a company 50% owned by Lin Tsz Fung. The SFC warned shareholders to exercise extreme caution when dealing in the shares of the company, noting that the share price could fluctuate substantially on trading in even a small number of shares.

Best Mart 360 was one of the main targets to be vandalised during 2019–2020 Hong Kong protests because it was accused of having ties to "Fujian gangs" that clashed with anti-government demonstrators. In response, the company announced a plan to shift focus to Mainland Chinese market to reduce dependence on Hong Kong market, including the opening of 15 to 20 stores in Macau within two years, while denying that the company had any connection with Fujian gangs. Despite the damage caused by the demonstrators, the company decided to keep operating the 72 affected stores (out of total 102 stores in Hong Kong).

The first store in Macau opened in December 2019, and by the end of 2023 the company operated a total of seven stores in the enclave.

In August 2024, CEO Hui Chi-kwan was arrested by the Independent Commission Against Corruption (ICAC) under the Prevention of Bribery Ordinance.
