= Yakuza exclusion ordinances =

Japanese anti-gangster laws

Yakuza exclusion ordinances or Organized crime exclusion ordinances (暴力団排除条例, Bōryoku-dan Haijo Jōrei) is the Japanese collective term for ordinances or local laws that aim to cut the citizen–yakuza relationship. The intent is to shift from "the yakuza versus the police" to "the yakuza versus society". The ordinances prohibit citizens from making or keeping up a relationship with the yakuza. The targeted acts and treatment for the violators differ between prefectures. Some prefectures only set an obligation of "endeavor" to citizens, or a penalty in which companies in violation of the law are publicly exposed. But others impose imprisonment or a fine on their citizens. Among the prefectures, Fukuoka leads the way in toughening the regulations.

There is criticism based on violation of freedom of expression and the yakuza's human rights. Yamaguchi-gumi leader Tsukasa denounced the ordinances as a "policy of social discrimination" (身分政策).

== History ==
Fukuoka Prefecture was the first prefecture where the comprehensive ordinance came into force: commencing April 10, 2010. This included a campaign where businesses post no gang signs as a warning for any yakuza member that entering the premises will result in fines or restraining orders. Once the ordinances of Okinawa and Tokyo went into effect on October 10, 2011, all of Japan's prefectures have had the ordinance.

The ordinances pursue cutting any implicit relationships between citizens and the yakuza. Some of the prohibitions contain punishment against citizens. But a few of the definitions and their range of application are blurry. Especially what acts should be regarded as "a payoff that assists the yakuza's activity or operation" and "close association with the yakuza"; these definitions remain somewhat arbitrary for the authorities.

== Criticism ==
There is criticism based on violation of freedom of expression and the yakuza's human rights. Yamaguchi-gumi leader Tsukasa denounced the ordinances as a "policy of social discrimination" (身分政策).

== Tokyo ordinance ==
Article 24-1 prohibits business owners from giving property benefits to the yakuza and its associates as payback for illegal demanding acts or illegal acts which benefit the business owner him/herself. For example, such acts are variations of cases where a business owner asks for the yakuza to intimidate a rival company; or to obstruct a local residents' campaign.

Anti-boryokudan law also covers a business owner's requests for illegal demanding acts. But the clause can also cover scenarios when the request is difficult to define, such as when a business owner pays money after the yakuza has acted without knowing in advance of the illegal acts conducted by the yakuza.

Penalty

On the first offense, the company receives a warning from the public safety commission. On the next offense, the police will reveal the company's name to the public. If the company violates the clause once again within a year after revelation of its name, the public safety commission then issues an order to stop the acts. If the company still does not obey the order, then the authorities can impose the penalty of imprisonment for not more than a year, or a fine of not more than 500,000 yen.

Article 24-3 prohibits business owners from giving property benefits to the yakuza which assists the yakuza's activity or operation, knowing they are the yakuza. The clause has a wider scope than the "Prohibition of Payoff" (Article 24–1). It does not limit the case in which benefits are given to the yakuza for business, but includes mere dealing, delivery, and contract. For example, many of the daily transactions — lending a room for a convention, delivering pizzas, repairing an office — could be considered a violation of this case if they are regarded as assisting the yakuza's activities or operations.

Providing lifelines such as electricity, water, and gas is permitted by the "exceptions clause" granted in article 24–3.

Penalty

There is no criminal code for violators. The only penalty is public revelation of a violating company. It is executed if the company doesn't follow warning again within a year after receiving the first warning from the public safety commission.

There is no prohibition for close contact with the yakuza in the Tokyo law. However, when a person participates in a party which the yakuza sponsors, this act could be regarded as an "...assist of the yakuza's activity or operation..." which is prohibited on Article 24–3. And also, when a business owner repeatedly plays golf or eats with members of the yakuza, the owner could be excluded from public projects, which is defined in Article 9.

Article 18 declares the obligation of endeavor for citizens. When a company makes a contract with a customer, the company is encouraged to add a term to confirm that the customer (whether operating as a business or an individual) is not a yakuza member. Adding this clause to the contract gives a reason to break out of the contract after discovering that he is a yakuza. In addition, this clause makes it easier to file a claim for indemnity against the yakuza.

Article 19 aims to prevent the yakuza from opening a new office anywhere in Tokyo.
