= Satoru Nomura =

Japanese Yakuza president (born 1946)

Satoru Nomora
- Born: 1946 (age 79–80); Kokura, Fukuoka Prefecture, Japan
- Occupation: Yakuza member (formerly)
- Criminal charges: Murder, Assault
- Criminal penalty: Life in Prison

Satoru Nomura (野村 悟, Nomura Satoru; born 1946) is a Japanese former Yakuza from Fukuoka Prefecture. He is the fifth president of the yakuza group Kudo-kai.

== Early life ==
Nomura was born in 1946 as the sixth and youngest child in a rich peasant family. As a teenager, he was addicted to gambling and dedicated his fortunes to this habit and became a delinquent. He was often sent into a juvenile home for various crimes, including stealing a car. Nomura did not graduate from secondary school. It was only in his 20s when he joined Kudo-kai, a Yakuza gang.

During his years in the underworld, Nomura was involved in crimes such as real estate fraud and illegal gambling dens, which earned him huge revenues. He also rose through the ranks to later become a Yakuza leader. At the peak of his criminal career in 2008, he had over 1,200 members under his wing, although by 2020 that number had fallen to around 400.

In 1998, Nomura publicly shot a leader of a fishery business. In 2012, a retired police officer who had been probing Kudo-kai was shot in the leg on Nomura's orders, while in 2013, a nurse at a cosmetic surgery clinic was stabbed after Nomura was displeased by her attitude and the outcome of his operation.

== Arrests ==
On September 11, 2014, Nomura was arrested by Riot Police for his involvement in the shooting and murder of Kunihiro Kajiwara, a former fishermen's union leader in Kitakyushu. On October 1, he was re-arrested for the stabbing and attempted murder of a nurse. On May 22, 2015, he was re-arrested for the stabbing and attempted murder of a dentist. On June 16, he was re-arrested on suspicion of tax evasion. On July 6, he was re-arrested for the attempted murder and shooting of a former police inspector.

== Trial and conviction ==
Nomura's trial opened January 14, 2021. On August 24, 2021, the Fukuoka District Court sentenced Nomura to death for ordering four assaults, including murder.

Nomura was the first "designated yakuza" (指定暴力団, Shitei Bōryokudan) boss to be sentenced to death. His right hand man Fumio Tanoue was sentenced to life imprisonment in the same trial. Nomura reportedly threatened presiding judge Tsutomu Adachi, stating that he would regret sending him to the gallows, which led to tightened security around the judge and all those involved in the court proceedings. He is currently appealing against the sentence.

On March 12, 2024, the Fukuoka High Court overturned Nomura's death sentence and downgraded it to life imprisonment. The High Court found him not guilty of murder.
