= Fujianese organized crime =

Crime syndicate

- Founding location: Fujian, China
- Years active: 1900s–present
- Territory: Global Chinese communities
- Ethnicity: Fuzhou people Putian people Hokkien people Zhenan people Teochew people Hailufeng people She people
- Criminal activities: Violence and bribery, collaboration with police brutality, human trafficking, narcotrafficking, racketeering
- Allies: Triad (Hong Kong); Big Circle Gang; Yakuza (Japan); Yamaguchi-gumi; American Mafia; Chinese Communist Party; Hong Kong Federation of Trade Unions; Grand Alliance for Safeguarding Hong Kong
- Rivals: Anti-communist, Hong Kong pro-democracy protestors: Hong Kong and Kowloon Trades Union Council; HK First; Professional Commons; People Power; League of Social Democrats; Action 18; National Socialism Association; China Youth Service & Recreation Centre

Fujianese organized crime or Fujian gangs (simplified Chinese: 福建帮; traditional Chinese: 福建幫) refers to crime syndicates, similar to triad gangs, composed of Fujianese people. The term primarily refers to Fujianese immigrant gangs in Hong Kong, but can also refer more broadly to Fujianese community associations or to native crime syndicates in the province of Fujian.

In recent years, Fujian gangs have come under global attention due to their role in attacks against Hong Kong pro-democracy protestors such as 2019 Yuen Long attack and the attack in North Point on 8 November 2019.

== History ==
=== 20th century and prior ===
Between the Qing dynasty and the reform and opening-up era of the People's Republic of China, many residents of mainland China, including those from Fuqing, Fujian, smuggled out of China. Fuqing emigrants and Fujianese in Japan faced difficult conditions and therefore organized community associations, which later evolved into the Fuqing Gang (Chinese: 福清帮; pinyin: fúqīngbāng), also called the Fulong Gang (Chinese: 福龍幫), a crime syndicate that became active internationally and monopolized underground casinos in Tokyo as its main source of income. Hong Kong media reports indicated that the Fuqing Gang collaborated with the Japanese Yakuza, the American Mafia, and Triads operating in mainland China in the operation of underground casinos and the trafficking of illegal drugs in East Asia.

Prior to the 1960s, a large exodus of Fujianese people moved from mainland China into North Point. It, along with Yuen Long, are regarded as the "territories" of Fujian gangs by Hong Kong media, with iron-vote support for their pro-Beijing ally Hong Kong Federation of Trade Unions. Early in the 1950s and 60s, the two districts, especially North Point which occasionally dubbed as the "Little Fujian" for once housing many Fujianese-run storefronts, served as the main "base of operations" for the pro-Beijing camp. The Fujianese supported left-wing labour associations and students during the 1967 Hong Kong riots, and the Chinese Goods Centre (Chinese: 華豐國貨) served as the command centre for the leftist.

=== 21st century ===
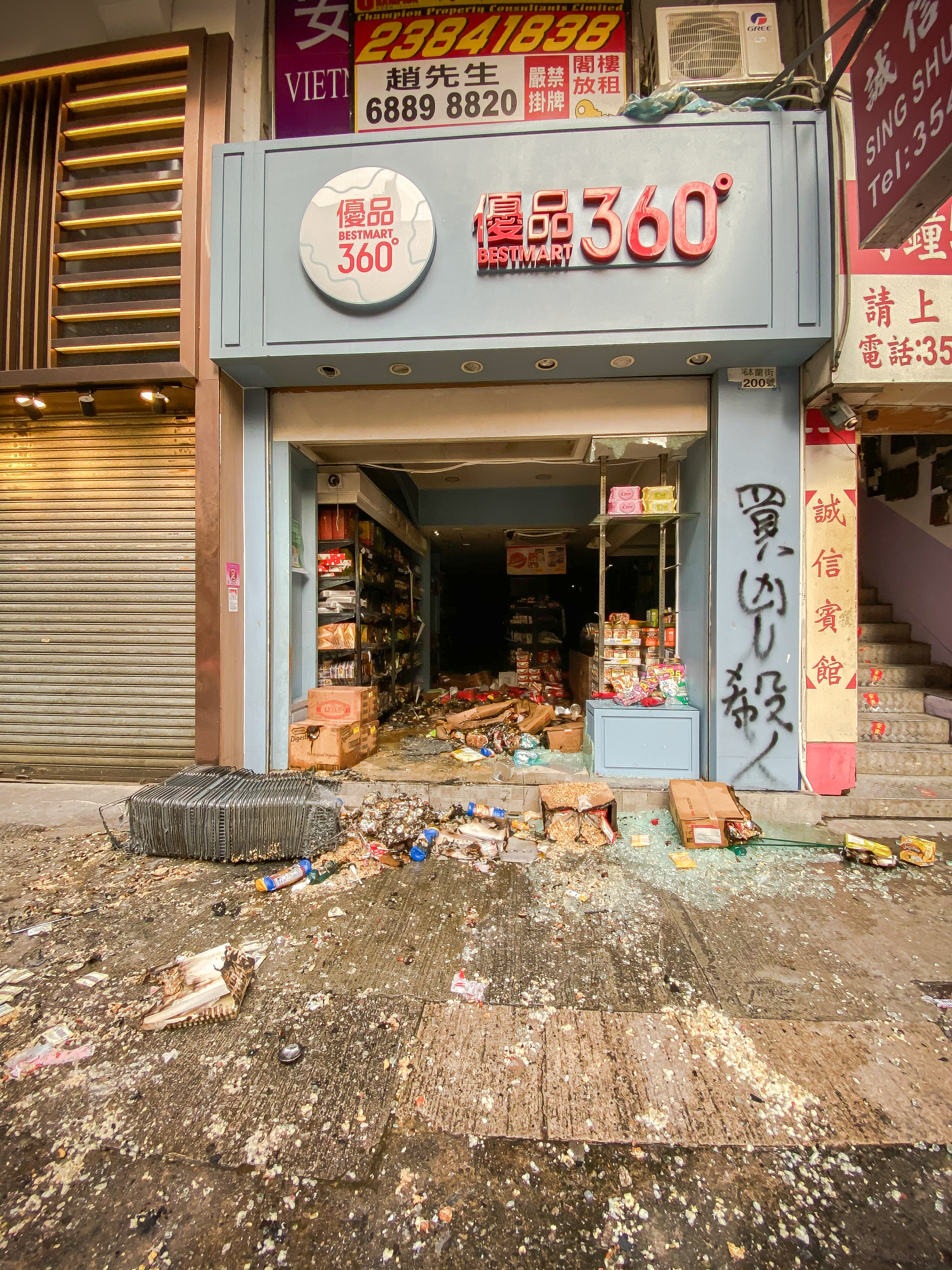
A vandalised Best Mart 360 storefront due to alleged links to Fujian gangs

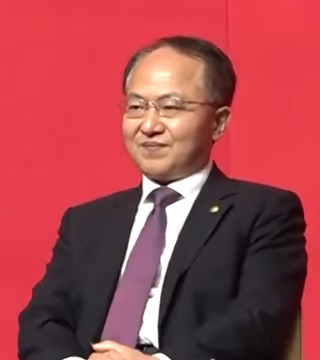
Wang Zhimin, then-director of Hong Kong Liaison Office from Fujian.

On 20 July 2019, during the 2019–20 Hong Kong protests, the radical pro-Beijing group "Grand Alliance for Safeguarding Hong Kong" (Chinese: 守護香港大聯盟) organised an assembly in support of the police, in which Shek Kang-chuen, founder of Hong Kong Economic Times, advocated violent attacks on anti-government protestors. The day after, scores of anti-government protestors were attacked in Yuen Long. A similar assault on protestors occurred in North Point on 11 August, in which some assailants identified themselves as Chinese or Fujianese. On 17 August, Grand Alliance supporters, including Fujian gang members, gathered again to show their support to authorities.

Following the violent assaults on protestors, Chinese state-run enterprises and businesses run by Fujianese were targeted. Among those was Best Mart 360, whose founder's links to Fujianese community associations led to vandalism, arson attacks, and looting of the company's approximately 360 branches. In September and October of the same year, Best Mart 360 denied any relationship with "Fujian gangs". Following the violent incidents, pro-Beijing sources praised the Fujianese in Hong Kong for demonstrating "patriotism", while state media People's Daily and Global Times called for "patriots who love Hong Kong" to take to the streets and "prepare to battle".

The director of the Hong Kong Liaison Office Wang Zhimin, a former member of the People's Liberation Army from Xianyou, Fujian, was suggested to have deep ties with Fujian gangs. On 4 January 2020, Wang was recalled by the State Council of the People's Republic of China and replaced by Luo Huining.

== In popular culture ==
The main antagonists of the 1999 film, The Corruptor are a powerful and violent gang called "The Fukienese Dragons", which is very similar to the real Fujian gang, both in criminal methods and activities, as well as in the violence and origin of the gang (which as its name gives, are originally from Fujian, China). In the film, this gang, led by violent and volatile gangster Bobby Vu (played by Byron Mann), fights a bloody war for control of Chinatown with a powerful tong, the Tung Fung Benevolent Association (in this case led by Benny 'Uncle Benny' Wong, played by Kim Chan), which is also involved in criminal activities and is the most powerful gang in Chinatown.

== See also ==
- List of Chinese criminal organizations
- Triad
- Snakehead
