= 759 Store =

Hong Kong chain store

- Type: Private
- Industry: Retail
- Founded: 2010
- Founder: Coils Lam
- Headquarters: Hong Kong
- Parent: CEC International Holdings Ltd (SEHK: 759)
- Website: 759store.com

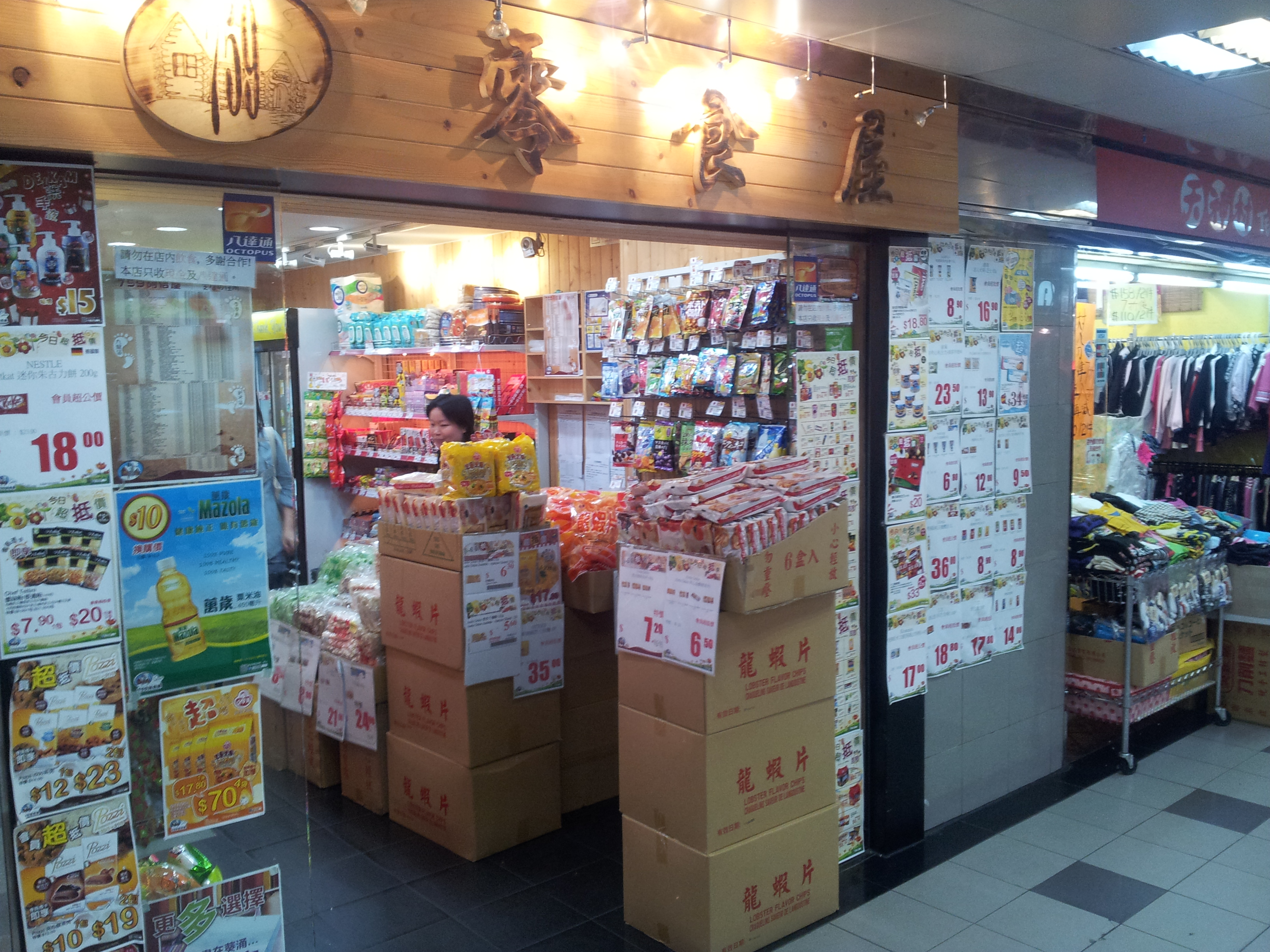
The first branch of 759 Store in Kwai Fong in Hong Kong.

759 Store is a Hong Kong chain store selling groceries and snacks. The name 759 is the Hong Kong Stock Exchange code for its parent company, CEC International Holdings Limited. Its Chinese name originated from the Japanese drama Oshin. 759 stores mainly import Japanese, Korean and other foreign food items and sells them more cheaply than other supermarkets in Hong Kong.

== History ==
The first 759 store opened in Kwai Chung Plaza on 7 July 2010. Following this, 11 branches were opened around Hong Kong. A membership scheme offers members a flat discount on undiscounted items. Between one-third and two-thirds of 759 Store's products are imported from Japan. 759 Store has also expanded to other places, including Korea, Taiwan, and Europe. As it expanded, it started to source more items from the places that it had expanded to, like Taiwan and Korea.

Expansion was rapid. By July 2012, 90 branches in total had been opened. At the end of 2012, the chain operated more than 120 convenience stores in Hong Kong. A year later there were 160, and by 2016 the number totalled 290. However, lower numbers of tourists and high rents led to losses and a cut back to around 190 stores in the city by 2018, focusing on residential areas, which narrowed the deficits.

The company announced that in December 2013 it would open a 759 Store Household Market, selling household goods and small appliances. The company also operates two 759 Store supermarkets, selling groceries and household items (with five planned to be open in January 2014).

On the founder's death in August 2018, the stock doubled in value on the first day's trading, in expectation of restructuring, or a possible merger or takeover. However, Tang Fung-kwan, who was quickly appointed Chairwoman (of CEC International), said that there were no plans to sell or any need to raise funds, and that she would continue to pursue Lam's "mission to turn around the company", with the backing of Lam's family, who remain majority shareholders.

=== Founder ===
Coils Lam Wai Chun (Chinese: 林偉駿, family name: Lam) (1958–2018) founded the company after an active business career built around his electronics manufacturer he founded in 1979. He was the founder of Coils Electronic Co., Ltd. (高雅線圈製品公司), an electronic-component company that had been running for 30 years. Under pressure during the 2008 financial crisis, including losing an element of control of the company, he started the 759 chain, under CEC. Lam died, aged 60, on 18 August 2018.

Lam's son Billy Lam, born 1991, is expected to take over the running of the business, at some point in the future.

== Business strategy ==
The early mission for 759 Stores was to fight against large-chain supermarkets. 759 Stores practises a 'Small Profit, Quick Return' strategy: selling each product at a wafer-thin margin with the aim of gaining through volume sales. In 2012, 759 Stores had achieved its goal of high turnover and income reached HK$3.5 billion. With the support of its parent company, CEC International Holdings Limited, 759 Store is capable of surviving even with its current low profit rate. 759 Store's unexpectedly low selling prices have threatened other small shops and invited critics to comment that 759 Store has become a killer of small entrepreneurship, which it denies.

More than 95 percent of products sold in the chain are imported directly, bypassing local distributors who the firm believes may be susceptible to anti-competitive pressure by Hong Kong's established retailers.

In April 2016, 759 announced the closure of 15 of its stores, blaming an appreciating yen and increased operating costs. The chain also adjusted pricing policy to make the discounts more consistent – a mark-up of around 35 percent on the dealer price, rather than the previous three levels of mark up, from 32 percent to 40 percent. Membership card holders get 33 percent off many products reducing their mark-up to 2 percent.

== Controversies ==
=== Coca-Cola incident ===
In early October 2011, Coca-Cola's Hong Kong franchise holder Swire Group stated that 759 Stores were selling Coca-Cola below its suggested retail price, and demanded that the chain raise its Coca-Cola retail price. 759 Store owner Lam at first declined, however, Swire Group later exercised its monopoly power over the beverage and increased the wholesale price of a can of Coca-Cola from HK$2 to HK$2.2.

On 10 October 2011, Lam decided to stop selling Coca-Cola. Swire Coca-Cola later admitted they provided suggested retail prices to customers of various sales channels for their reference. This incident caused a stir and urged the establishment of the Competition Bill to protect the small businesses in Hong Kong.
