= Human rights in Japan =

Japan is a constitutional monarchy. The Human Rights Scores Dataverse ranked Japan somewhere in the middle among G7 countries on its human rights performance, below Germany and Canada and above the United Kingdom, France, Italy, and the United States. The Fragile States Index ranked Japan second last in the G7 after the United States on its "Human Rights and Rule of Law" sub-indicator.

According to the statistics of the Ministry of Justice (MOJ) for 2022, the MOJ human rights organs received 159,864 consultations on human rights violations, completed 7,627 cases of remedial measures for victims, and initiated 7,859 cases of remedial measures. Of the cases in which the MOJ completed redress for victims, the largest number of cases related to discriminatory treatment were for discriminated burakumin (406 cases), followed by the physically disabled, the sick, foreign residents, women, the elderly, and gender identity. Of the cases in which the MOJ initiated redress for victims, 18.6% involved privacy violations, 14.5% involved labor rights, 13.3% involved school bullying, 12.8% involved assault and abuse, and 10.2% involved extortion and coercion. According to the MOJ, the number of human rights violations has decreased from year to year, but the number of cases of school bullying and human rights violations on the Internet remained high.

Foreigners in Japan may face human rights violations that Japanese citizens do not. In recent years, Western media has reported that Japanese firms frequently confiscate the passports of guest workers in Japan, particularly unskilled laborers from the Philippines and other poorer Asian countries.

== Major issues ==
Japan has a criminal conviction rate of over 99%. In several cases, courts have acknowledged confessions were forced and released those imprisoned. To combat this, a law was passed in 2016 requiring some interrogations to be videotaped. However, this only applies to people accused of serious crimes, such as murder, arson and kidnapping, which make up only 3% of cases. In common law countries which practice trial by jury, a high conviction rate may indicate that defendants are not receiving a fair trial. Sometimes Japanese prosecutors decide not to prosecute in the case of minor crimes or when there is a high possibility of innocence. Some Japanese researchers believe that is one of the causes of the high conviction rate in Japan. The prosecution rate in Japan is 33.4%. 64.3% was not pursued. Japan also practices the death penalty, to which the U.N. objects, as do several prominent NGOs and the European Union (see Capital punishment in Japan).

There is much controversy surrounding the social and legal treatment of minorities. Although the Japanese consider themselves to be a homogeneous people, minorities do exist, and they often suffer discrimination. The largest indigenous minority are the two to four million hisabetsu buraku ("discriminated communities"), descendants of the outcast communities of feudal Japan. Other such minorities include the Ainu, the indigenous inhabitants of northern Japan, and the people of Okinawa. Japan also has several hundred thousand native residents of Korean and Chinese descent who together with other foreign residents experience varying forms and degrees of discrimination.

== Judicial system ==
=== Confessions ===
The Constitution and the Criminal Code include safeguards to ensure that no criminal suspect can be compelled to make a self-incriminating conviction. In 2003, the use of leather restraining body belts was abolished. Softer leather handcuffs without body belts were instituted as substitute restraining devices. Amnesty International has urged Japan to reform its police interrogation methods.

=== Deaths of prisoners ===
There have been accounts of prisoners in Japan that have died under suspicious circumstances while in custody.

- On June 20, 1994, Iranian national Arjang Mehrpooran died from unknown causes while in custody for a visa violation at the Minami Senju police station. Allegations have been made that his death was caused by assault.
- On August 9, 1997, Mousavi Abarbe Kouh Mir Hossein, an Iranian national, had his neck broken and died while in the custody of the Kita Ward Immigration Detention Center.
- In 2001, two Nagoya prison guards reportedly sprayed a high-power water hose at an "unruly" inmate's anus, resulting in his death the following day. In the outcome of his March 2003 trial, the warden was warned to prevent further abuses by his subordinates.
- In 2002, an inmate at Nagoya Prison died after guards, as a disciplinary measure, used leather handcuffs and body belts too tightly clinched.
- On March 22, 2010, Abubaka Awudu Suraj, a citizen of Ghana, died while in the custody of the Japanese Immigration Bureau while being deported from Japan.
- On March 6, 2021, Wishma Sandamali, a Sri Lankan woman, died in custody at an immigration detention facility in Nagoya after her requests for provisional release and adequate medical care were denied.

In 2003, the Justice Ministry formed a special team to investigate 1,566 prisoner deaths from 1993 to 2002. A preliminary report suggested that nearly one third of the cases involved suspicious circumstances. However, in June, the Ministry announced that there was evidence of abuse only in the two Nagoya fatalities. Regarding the other suspicious deaths, the Ministry said that approximately 10 deaths could be attributed to poor medical care. The authorities reported they had lost the documentation on nine deaths in Tokyo's Fuchū Prison. The remaining deaths were determined to be "not suspicious".

As of May 2019, Japan has not signed nor ratified the Optional Protocol to the Convention against Torture and other Cruel, Inhuman or Degrading Treatment or Punishment.

=== Prison system ===
Prison conditions met international standards; although some lacked adequate medical care and sufficient heating in the winter or cooling in the summer and some facilities were overcrowded. Prisoners were not allowed to purchase or receive supplementary food. While death records are kept for 10 years, many of them were missing, which sparked an ongoing review of the prison system. Prisons operated at an average 117% capacity. In some institutions, two inmates were placed in cells designed for one inmate, and thirty or sixty in cells meant for 15.

According to prison officials at Fuchū and Yokohama prisons, medical attention was inadequate. The MOJ's Corrections Bureau likewise acknowledged that correctional facilities lacked medical preparedness. The Government's Project Team on Medical Issues of Correctional Institutions continued to consult with related organizations on such issues as increasing medical staff, upgrading medical conditions during nights and weekends, and strengthening cooperative relationships with medical institutions in the community. In May, the Minister formed a subcommittee to improve prison medical facilities.

In some institutions clothing and blankets were insufficient to protect inmates against cold weather. Most prisons did not provide heating during nighttime hours in winter despite freezing temperatures, subjecting inmates to a range of preventable cold injuries. Foreign prisoners in the Tokyo area continued to present to visiting diplomats during the year fingers and toes affected by chillblains of varying severity, the direct result of long-term exposure to cold.

According to the Japan Federation of Bar Associations, the authorities are permitted to read letters sent or received by prisoners and they are not required to disclose this practice to prisoners. If the content is deemed "inappropriate", the letter may be censored or confiscated. All visits with convicted prisoners were monitored; however, prisoners whose cases were pending were allowed private access to their legal representatives.

The MOJ is not required to inform a condemned inmate's family prior to the person's execution. Human rights organizations reported that lawyers also were not told of an execution until after the fact and that death row prisoners were held for years in solitary confinement with little contact with anyone but prison guards. Parole may not be granted for any reason, including medical and humanitarian reasons, until an inmate has served two thirds of his or her sentence.

The JFBA and human rights groups have criticized the prison system, with its emphasis on strict discipline and obedience to numerous rules. Prison rules remained confidential. While the Prison Law Enforcement Regulation stipulates that the maximum time prisoners may be held in single cells is 6 months, activists claim that wardens continued to have broad leeway in enforcing punishments selectively, including "minor solitary confinement", which may be imposed for a minimum of 1 and not more than 60 days. Claims have also been made that prisoners were sometimes forced to kneel motionless in an empty cell for several hours at a time; however, foreigners and the handicapped were allowed to sit on a hard stool, at the discretion of the prison warden.

In December, the Upper House passed both a Crime-Victims law and a revision to the 1908 Prison Law. The Crime-Victims law calls for compensation and counseling for crime victims, upholding victims' rights, and providing victims with criminal investigation information. Aimed at toughening penalties against felons, the Penal Code revision establishes new charges for gang rape, increases maximum prison terms and penalties for life-threatening crimes, and extends the statute of limitations for prosecuting capital offenses from 15 to 29 years.

In February 2003, the government ratified the Convention on the Transfer of Sentenced Persons, allowing foreign prisoners to petition to serve their sentences in their home country. The government added the stipulation that prisoners must serve at least one third of their sentence in Japan before petitions will be considered. As of June 2007, 10 American prisoners have been transferred to the United States to complete their sentences.

Women and juveniles were housed separately from men; however, male prison guards sometimes guarded female prisoners. During the year, a male prison warden was charged with "violence and cruelty by a special public officer" for engaging in sexual acts with a female inmate awaiting trial. During the year, some women's detention facilities were operating over stated capacity. Pretrial detainees were held separately from convicted prisoners.

While the government limited access by human rights groups to detention facilities, prison visits were allowed. However, Amnesty International claimed that human rights groups were not allowed access to Nagoya prison because of ongoing court cases related to alleged abuses.

=== Prohibition of arbitrary arrest or detention ===
The Constitution prohibits arbitrary arrest and detention, and the Government generally observes these prohibitions. The law provides for judicial determination of the legality of detention. Persons may not be detained without charge, and prosecuting authorities must be prepared to demonstrate that probable cause exists to detain the accused. Under the law, a suspect may be held in detention at either a regular detention facility or "substitute" (police) detention facility for up to 72 hours. A judge must interview suspects prior to detention. A judge may extend preindictment custody by up to two consecutive 10-day periods based on a prosecutor's application. These extensions were sought and granted routinely. Under extraordinary circumstances, prosecutors may seek an additional 5-day extension, bringing the maximum period of preindictment custody to 28 days.

The National Police Safety Commission oversees the National Police Agency (NPA). In addition, each prefecture has a prefectural police safety commission as well as a prefectural police agency, which was primarily funded by the prefecture's budget. Corruption and impunity were not problems within either the national or the prefectural police forces.

Under the Criminal Procedure Code, police and prosecutors have the power to control or limit access by legal counsel when deemed necessary for the sake of an investigation. Counsel may not be present during interrogations at any time before or after indictment. As a court-appointed attorney is not approved until after indictment, suspects must rely on their own resources to hire an attorney before indictment, although local bar associations provided detainees with limited free counseling. Critics charged that access to counsel was limited both in duration and frequency; however, the Government denied that this was the case. Incommunicado detention could be used for up to 23 days.

Critics charged that allowing suspects to be detained by the same authorities who interrogated them heightened the potential for abuse and coercion. The Government countered that cases of persons sent to police detention facilities tended to be those in which the facts were not in dispute. An MOJ regulation permits officials to limit the amount of documentation related to ongoing court cases retained by prisoners.

The Law for Expediting Court Procedure became effective in 2003. The average trial period in 2005 was 3.2 months for criminal cases and 8.2 months for civil cases. The length of time before a suspect was brought to trial depended on the nature of the crime, but rarely exceeded 3 months from the date of arrest; the average was 1 to 2 months.

=== Trials ===
The Constitution provides for an independent judiciary, and the Government has generally respected this provision in practice. The Cabinet appoints judges for 10-year terms, which can be renewed until judges reach the age of 65. Justices of the Supreme Court can serve until the age of 70, but face periodic review through popular referendums.

There are several levels of court, including high courts, district courts, family courts, and summary courts, with the Supreme Court serving as the final court of appeal. Normally a trial begins at the district court level, and a verdict may be appealed to a higher court, and ultimately, to the Supreme Court. The government generally respected in practice the constitutional provisions for the right to a speedy and public trial by an impartial tribunal in all criminal cases. Although most criminal trials were completed within a reasonable length of time, cases occasionally took several years to work their way through the trial and appeals process.

In July 2003, the Diet passed legislation aimed at reducing the average time required to complete criminal trials and civil trials that include witness examination. Its provisions include hiring substantial numbers of additional court and MOJ personnel, revising bar examinations, establishing new graduate law schools to increase the overall number of legal professionals threefold by 2010, and requiring that courts and opposing litigants jointly work to improve trial planning by allowing for earlier evidence collection and disclosure. The advisory panel on judicial reform released the official standards for setting up graduate law schools, and in March 2004, 68 universities (22 public and 46 private) opened new law schools.

The July 2003, law also makes the Supreme Court responsible for accelerating proceedings in lower courts, imposes a 2-year time limit for courts to bring criminal and civil trials to conclusion, and requires the government to take the legal and financial measures necessary to accomplish these goals. A defendant is informed of the charges upon arrest and is assured a public trial by an independent civilian court with defense counsel and the right of cross-examination. There was no trial by jury; however, a judicial reform bill passed in May will allow serious criminal cases to be tried by a six-person, randomly selected jury and panel of judges. The law was scheduled to take effect in 2009.

The defendant is presumed innocent. The Constitution provides defendants with the right not to be compelled to testify against themselves as well as to free and private access to counsel; however, the Government contended that the right to consult with attorneys is not absolute and can be restricted if such restriction is compatible with the spirit of the Constitution. Access sometimes was abridged in practice; for example, the law allows prosecutors to control access to counsel before indictment, and there were allegations of coerced confessions. Defendants are protected from the retroactive application of laws and have the right of access to incriminating evidence after a formal indictment. However, the law does not require full disclosure by prosecutors, and material that the prosecution does not use in court may be suppressed. Critics claimed that legal representatives of defendants did not always have access to all needed relevant material in the police record. A defendant who is dissatisfied with the decision of a trial court of first instance may appeal to a higher court.

No guidelines mandate the acceptable quality of communications between judges, lawyers, and non-Japanese speaking defendants, and no standard licensing or qualification system for certifying court interpreters exists. A trial may proceed even if the accused does not understand what is happening or being said. Foreign detainees frequently claimed that police urged them to sign statements in Japanese that they could not read and were not translated adequately.

As of May 2019, Japan has not signed nor ratified the First Optional Protocol to the International Covenant on Civil and Political Rights and Second Optional Protocol to the International Covenant on Civil and Political Rights.

There were no reports of political prisoners.

=== Other issues ===
- The Constitution does not prohibit arbitrary interference with privacy, family, home, or correspondence but prohibit them by case law on interpretation on Article 13 of the Constitution, and the government generally respects these prohibitions in practice. In April 2003, the Public Security Investigation Agency extended surveillance of the terrorist group Aleph (formerly known as Aum Shinrikyo) because the government declared the group still posed a danger to society. In 2002, the Defense Agency confirmed reports that it had violated a law protecting personal information when it compiled lists of citizens seeking official documents. A privacy bill to prevent such actions passed the Diet on May 2, 2003.
- The government's attitude regarding international and nongovernmental investigation of alleged violations of human rights is generally cooperative and responsive to human rights groups' views, although the government restricts their access to detention facilities. A number of domestic and international human rights groups generally operated without governmental restrictions, investigating and publishing their findings on human rights cases. Government officials generally were cooperative and responsive to their views, although the Government restricted access by human rights groups to detention facilities.
- In December 2008 United Nations Human Rights Committee gave a recommendation to Japan relating to public welfare in Article 12 and 13 of the Constitution that "while taking note of the State party's explanation that 'public welfare' cannot be relied on as a ground on placing arbitrary restrictions on human rights, the Committee reiterate its concern that the concept of 'public welfare' is vague and open-ended and may permit restrictions exceeding those permissible under the Covenant (art. 2)."

== Civil liberties ==
=== Freedom of speech and of the press ===
The Japanese Constitution provides for freedom of speech and of the press. In theory, an independent press, an effective judiciary, and a functioning democratic political system combine to ensure freedom of speech and of the press. However, Japan's system of exclusive press clubs has been criticised by press freedom groups. The clubs often provide major media outlets with exclusive access to news sources, while generally barring foreign and freelance reporters. The clubs provide the establishment press with access to official press conferences and background briefings with politicians, lawyers and business leaders. Critics say the club system allows the authorities to suppress news that they consider unfavorable to them and that it lowers the quality of news coverage.

Free speech and press issues include:

- In July 2003, the Diet passed legislation prohibiting the solicitation of sex from minors through the Internet. The Japan Internet Providers Association and the Telecom Services Association expressed concerns about the definitions of child prohibited sites and about the actions providers are required to take to prevent illegal use of Internet sites.
- In 2015 journalists and political experts report that the government of Prime Minister Shinzō Abe is engineering a fundamental shift in the balance of power between his administration and the news media, using tactics to silence criticism that go beyond anything his predecessors tried. These include:
  - more aggressive complaints to the bosses of critical journalists and commentators, causing some reporters and commentators to lose their jobs;
  - more blatant retaliation against outlets that persist in faulting the administration;
  - appointing a new chairman to the national public broadcaster, NHK, who declared that the network will not deviate too far from the government's views; and
  - openly hinting at revoking the broadcasting licenses of overly critical networks under a law that requires that TV news reports not intentionally twist facts.

Journalists, commentators and media experts say that news outlets are now censoring their own coverage or removing critical voices to avoid drawing official ire.

Under Article 4 of the Broadcasting Law, Japanese television broadcasting requires political fairness, and there are penalties such as license revocation. This law has existed since before the Abe administration. The license revocation issue was an answer to the opposition party's question on the Broadcasting law. However, Japanese media strongly opposed this. UNCHR calls for the removal of Article 4, but many Japanese media strongly oppose the removal of Article 4.

Ichiro Furutachi is a journalist who lost his job. He told Sankei Shimbun, “The administration is not putting pressure,” “If our report is lie, our program will be crushed, so there is a self-regulation to make a safe report afraid of it.”

==== Internet freedom ====
Freedom House rated Japan's Internet access as “free” with scores as low as 22.

Internet access in Japan is absolutely unrestricted. There are neither government restrictions on Internet access nor reports that the government checks on e-mail or Internet chat rooms without appropriate legal authority in the country. The constitution and law broadly protects free expression, and the government respects this right in practice. The government does not interfere with access to Internet publications. Individuals and groups engage in the pleasant expression of views via the Internet, including e‑mail. The law and constitution prohibit arbitrary interference with privacy, family, home, or correspondence, and the government generally respects these prohibitions in practice.

=== Freedom of peaceful assembly and association ===
The Constitution provides for the freedom of assembly and association, and the Government generally respects these rights in practice.

=== Freedom of religion ===
The Constitution provides for freedom of religion.

Article 20 states:

Freedom of religion is guaranteed to all. No religious organization shall receive any privileges from the State, nor exercise any political authority.

(2) No person shall be compelled to take part in any religious act, celebration, rite or practice.

(3) The State and its organs shall refrain from religious education or any other religious activity.

Members of the Unification Church alleged that police did not respond to allegations of forced deprogramming of church members. While deprogramming cases decreased during the year, a Unification Church spokesman reported that prosecutors dropped two cases due to insufficient evidence. Although one member reportedly was kidnapped by her family during the year, the Unification Church did not report the case to police. Concerns remained regarding the tendency of officials to judge deprogramming as a family matter. Unlike in previous years, Jehovah's Witnesses reported that their religious rights were respected by the Government during the year.

=== Freedom of movement ===
The Constitution provides for the freedom of movement within the country, foreign travel, immigration, and repatriation, and the Government generally respects them in practice. Citizens have the right to travel freely both within the country and abroad, to change their place of residence, to emigrate, and to repatriate voluntarily. Citizenship may be forfeited by naturalization in a foreign country or by failure of persons born with dual nationality to elect citizenship at the required age. The law does not permit forced exile, and it is not used.

The law provides for the granting of refugee status or asylum to persons in accordance with the 1951 U.N. Convention Relating to the Status of Refugees or its 1967 Protocol. In practice, the government provided protection against refoulement, the return of persons to a country where they feared persecution, but did not routinely grant refugee or asylum status. The Government cooperated with the office of the United Nations High Commissioner for Refugees and other humanitarian organizations in assisting refugees.

In May 2003, the Diet passed a bill abolishing the 60-day application deadline previously required for aliens seeking refugee status. The previous refugee recognition law stipulated that those seeking refugee status had to apply within 60 days upon arriving in Japan or within 60 days of learning that they were likely to be persecuted in their home country. An alien recognized as a refugee has access to educational facilities, public relief and aid, and social welfare benefits.

Government records indicated that 523,617 persons were detained in 2003 at immigration detention centers. According to media reports, several deportations were carried out in secret. In July, two Kurdish families staged a 72-day protest against their deportation orders in front of the United Nations University in Tokyo.

As of 2005, the government has granted refugee and asylum status to those claiming fear of persecution in only a small number of cases. A nongovernmental organization (NGO), in a statement to the Sub-Commission on the Promotion and Protection of Human Rights, noted that, from 1982 to December 2002, 301 persons were accepted as refugees. The Government considered that most persons seeking asylum in the country did so for economic reasons. In 2003, there were approximately 7,900 refugees and asylum seekers in the country, of whom an estimated 7,700 were Vietnamese and Cambodian refugees. Out of 336 refugee claims submitted in 2003, the Government granted asylum to 10 persons from Burma, Burundi, and Iran and issued long-term residence permits based on humanitarian considerations to 16. As part of its ongoing family-reunification program for close relatives of Indochinese refugees resettled in earlier years, the Government admitted 147 refugees from Vietnam and Cambodia in 2003.

In May 2003, a law was passed granting the Justice Minister authority to issue temporary stay permits to persons seeking asylum. While this law provides a way for asylum seekers to have legal status in the country during the refugee recognition process, in practice it was quite difficult to obtain such permits. In January 2003, the Immigration Bureau began to give detailed, written explanations of decisions not to grant refugee status to asylum-seekers and opened an information office at Narita Airport for potential asylum seekers.

== Political rights ==
The Constitution provides citizens with the right to change their government peacefully, and citizens exercised this right in practice through periodic, free, and fair elections held on the basis of universal suffrage. The country is a parliamentary democracy governed by the political party or parties able to form a majority in the lower house of its bicameral Diet. The LDP and the Japan Innovation Party form the existing coalition government. Except for brief hiatuses in the 1990s and from 2009 to 2012, the LDP has been the dominant party in every government since the mid-1950s. The last general elections were held on October 27, 2024, and elections for the Upper House were held on July 20, 2025.

According to National Police Agency figures for January through June 2003, there were 43 arrests involving political corruption for such charges as bribery, bid-rigging, and violation of the Political Funds Control Law. This was an increase of 14 cases from the previous year for the same time period. In recent years, the numbers of women holding public office has slowly increased. As of August 2023, women held 46 of 465 seats in the Lower House of the Diet and 69 seats in the 248-seat Upper House. As of August 2023, there were two women in the Cabinet. As of August 2023, 2 of the country's 47 governors were women.

As of August 2023, Japan had not ratified nor signed the Genocide Convention, the 1926 Slavery Convention or the United Nations 1956 Supplementary Convention on the Abolition of Slavery.

== Discrimination ==
The Constitution prohibits discrimination of citizens on the basis of race, creed, gender, social status, or family origin; non-citizens are not protected from these forms of discrimination by the constitution nor the law as of 2014.

=== Gender identity harassment ===
For the first time ever, MHLW, the Ministry of Internal Affairs and Communications, and MEXT issued ministerial regulations and formal notices requiring corporations, local governments, and schools attend to issues pertaining sexual orientation and gender identity harassment and publicly outing a person as LGBT. This took place in May 2019.

== Violence against women ==
Violence against women, particularly domestic violence, often goes unreported due to social and cultural concerns about shaming one's family or endangering the reputation of one's spouse or children. NPA statistics on violence against women probably understated the magnitude of the problem. According to NPA statistics, there were 12,568 cases of alleged domestic violence and 1,499 restraining orders issued in 2003. Police took action in 41 cases in which court orders were violated. Between April and September, the 120 preferential consultation centers received 24,818 cases of domestic violence consultations. Of the total 103,986 consultations since fiscal 2002, 99.6% were for women.

The law allows district courts to impose 6-month restraining orders on perpetrators of domestic violence and to sentence violators up to 1 year in prison or impose fines of up to 1 million yen. According to Supreme Court figures from January through September 2003, 1,579 applications for restraining orders against abusive spouses were sought, and 1,256 were issued. The orders either banned perpetrators from approaching their victims or ordered them to move away from the home, or both. The law also covers common-law marriages and divorced individuals; it also encourages prefectures to expand shelter facilities for domestic abuse victims and stipulates that local governments offer financial assistance to 40 private institutions already operating such shelters.

The revision to the Law for the Prevention of Spousal Violence and the Protection of Victims passed in May expanded the definition of spousal violence to include mental, sexual, and physical abuse and increased the length of restraining orders from 2 weeks to 2 months.

The Supreme Court ruled in favor of article 750 of the Civil Code in December 2015. That article requires a husband and wife to adopt the same surname.

== Rape ==
NPA statistics reported 2,472 rapes in 2003. Husbands have been prosecuted for spousal rape; usually these cases involved a third party who assisted in the rape. In light of several high-profile gang rapes in 2003 involving college students at Waseda University, the Upper House passed a bill in December making gang rape an offense punishable by a minimum penalty of 4 years in prison. In November 2004, a former student was sentenced to 14 years in prison for raping two women at a party organized by the "Super Free" student group, as well as a third woman in December 2001. All 13 other defendants received jail sentences of up to 10 years. Many local governments responded to the need for confidential assistance for abused women by establishing special women's consultation departments in police and prefectural offices. However, as of 2018, women were still deterred from reporting rape and sexual assault by legal and practical obstacles, by the treatment of women who speak out, such as Shiori Itō, and by many other difficulties. The former chief of the Osaka District Public Prosecutors Office sexually assaulted an inebriated female prosecutor and she was threatened. The charges were filed and the case went to trial in 2024, six years later.

== Comfort women ==
Several cases filed by women forced to work as "comfort women" (women and girls forced into sexual slavery) during World War II were finalized during 2004. In February, the Tokyo High Court rejected an appeal by 7 Taiwanese former "comfort women", while in November the Supreme Court dismissed a damage suit filed in 1991 by 35 Korean wartime "comfort women". In December 2004 the Tokyo High Court dismissed an appeal by 4 Chinese former "comfort women", and the Supreme Court rejected a suit filed in 1993 by 46 Filipina wartime "comfort women".

== Marriage and divorce ==
=== Custody ===
When couples divorce there is a strong bias in Japanese family courts which gives 80% of the mothers custody of children according to 2004 statistics from the National Institute of Population and Social Security Research. Joint physical custody or shared parenting is uncommon.

=== Abduction ===
There is major criticism about divorced Japanese parents and foreign parents who are denied access to their children post-divorce. Many of these divorced people lose access and contact with their children. Foreign parents post-divorce can suffer from child-abduction. In 2020, lawmakers of the European Union adopted a non-binding resolution for Japan to adhere to parental access, visitation rights and to return abducted children.

=== Corporal punishments ===
In February 2020 all use of corporal punishments against children in Japan ended after the Ministry of Health, Labour and Welfare (MHLW) issued guidelines to implement 2019 amendments made to laws on children.

== Rights of children ==
Boys and girls have equal access to health care and other public services. Education is mostly free and compulsory through the lower secondary level (age 14 or ninth grade). Education was available widely to students who met minimum academic standards at the upper secondary level through the age of 18. Society places an extremely high value on education, and enrollment levels for both boys and girls through the free upper secondary level exceeded 96%.

Children under the age of 14 cannot be held criminally responsible for their actions. Under juvenile law, juvenile suspects are tried in family court and have the right of appeal to an appellate court. Family court proceedings are not open to the public, a policy that has been criticized by family members of juvenile crime victims. For the last several years, juvenile crime has shown a trend toward more serious offenses such as murder, robbery, arson, and rape. The Tokyo prefectural government continued programs to protect the welfare of stateless children, whose births their illegal immigrant mothers had refused to register for fear of forcible repatriation.

=== Child abuse and neglect ===
Public attention has focused increasingly on reports of frequent child abuse in the home. The law grants child welfare officials the authority to prohibit abusive parents from meeting or communicating with their children, although due to Japanese cultural views on family matters being "private", this enforcement option is rarely exercised. The law also bans abuse under the guise of discipline and obliges teachers, doctors, and welfare officials to report any suspicious circumstances to 1 of the 182 nationwide local child counseling centers or to a municipal welfare center. In May 2003, the Ministry of Health, Labor, and Welfare reported that 108 children died as a result of child abuse since the enactment of the Child Abuse Prevention Law in 2000.

In 2003, there were a record 23,738 cases of child abuse, up almost 2% from 2002, according to the Cabinet Office. Approximately 50% of the cases involved violence, and 40% were cases of parental neglect. Child welfare centers likewise reported a record 26,573 calls in 2003, an increase of 2,800 calls from the previous year. Generally accepted statistics indicate that upwards of 70% of child abuse cases involve a female perpetrator, usually the child's mother. Although the Government offered subsidies to local governments to combat record-high child abuse, only 13% accepted the offer. Most of the local governments declining the subsidies stated they could not afford to pay their share of the bill.

in 2014 the police reported 13,037 cases of child abuse including sexual abuse and death.

On July 20, 2020, a report by HRW revealed that child athletes in Japan have routinely suffered physical, sexual and verbal abuse from their coaches, which led some of them to take their own lives. The report “‘I Was Hit So Many Times I Can’t Count’: Abuse of Child Athletes in Japan, documented the country's history of corporal punishment in sport, known as taibatsu in Japanese, and revealed child abuse in sports training throughout Japanese schools, federations, and elite sports.

== Trafficking in persons ==
The Constitution prohibits holding persons in bondage of any kind. Under the criminal code, involuntary servitude is prohibited unless as punishment for a crime. The criminal code prohibits the buying and selling of human beings; there is no legislation for institutions and practices similar to slavery.

Although Japan has laws that criminalise sex trafficking and labor trafficking, these laws are not considered to be comprehensive with definitions that are in line with international law.

In April 2004, the Government of Japan created a task force to combat trafficking in persons. In December of the same year, the Government released its Action Plan to combat trafficking in persons. The Action Plan focuses on the prevention and elimination of trafficking in persons, and the protection of trafficking victims. The Action Plan calls for a review of "entertainer" visas, strengthened immigration control, revision of the penal code to make trafficking in persons a crime, and added protection of victims through shelters, counselling, and repatriation assistance.

As of May 2019, Japan has ratified the Convention against Transnational Organized Crime, the Protocol to Prevent, Suppress and Punish Trafficking in Persons, especially Women and Children, and the United Nations Convention Against Corruption.

=== Sexual exploitation ===
Trafficking of women and girls into the country has been a problem. Women and girls, primarily from Thailand, the Philippines, and Eastern Europe, were trafficked into the country for sexual exploitation and forced labour. Women and girls from Colombia, Brazil, Mexico, South Korea, Malaysia, Burma, and Indonesia also were trafficked into the country in smaller numbers. The country was a destination for illegal immigrants from China who were trafficked by organized crime groups and held in debt bondage for sexual exploitation and indentured servitude in sweatshops and restaurants. The Government reported that some smugglers used killings and abduction to enforce cooperation.

Although reliable statistics on the number of women trafficked to the country were unavailable, human rights groups reported that up to 200,000 persons, mostly Southeast Asian women, are smuggled annually into the country and forced to work in the sex industry. In 2003, the NPA arrested 41 individuals for trafficking-related offenses, 8 of whom were traffickers. Of these individuals, 36 were convicted, 14 received prison terms, 17 received fines, and 5 received both a fine and prison term. In February 2003, 17 prefecture police offices and the Tokyo Metropolitan police simultaneously raided 24 strip clubs and rescued 68 trafficking victims.

== Rights of persons with disabilities ==
There were an estimated 3.4 million persons over the age of 18 with physical disabilities and roughly 3 million with mental disabilities. Although not generally subject to overt discrimination in employment, education, or in the provision of other state services, persons with disabilities faced limited access to public transportation, "mainstream" public education, and other facilities. The Deliberation Panel on the Employment of the Handicapped, which operates within the Ministry of Health, Labour and Welfare, has mandated that private companies with 300 or more employees hire a fixed minimum proportion of persons with disabilities. The penalty for noncompliance is a fine.

The law does not mandate accessibility to buildings for persons with disabilities; however, the law on construction standards for public facilities allows operators of hospitals, theaters, hotels, and similar enterprises to receive low-interest loans and tax benefits if they build wider entrances and elevators to accommodate persons with disabilities.

The Law to Promote the Employment of the Handicapped includes those with mental disabilities. The law also loosened the licensing requirements for community support centers that promote employment for persons with disabilities, and it introduced government subsidies for the employment of persons with mental disabilities in part-time jobs. In 2003, workers with disabilities employed by private companies comprised on average 1.5% of the total number of regular employees, somewhat less than the legally stipulated rate of 1.8%. While nearly 70% of large corporations (1,000 or more employees) fell short of this goal, several large corporations had special divisions for workers with disabilities, including Omron, Sony, and Honda. For example, 80% of Omron's Kyoto factory staff of 82 had disabilities, with the majority having severe disabilities. These employees earn an average of 3 million yen per year, which is above the minimum wage.

At the end of 2002, all prefectural governments and 91.5% of local city governments had developed basic plans for citizens with disabilities. In June, the Disabled Persons Fundamental Law was revised, obligating all municipalities to draw up formal plans for the disabled.

As of June 2015, Japan has ratified the Convention on the Rights of Persons with Disabilities but not signed nor ratified the Optional Protocol to the Convention on the Rights of Persons with Disabilities.

== Minorities ==
Burakumin, Koreans, Chinese, and alien workers experienced varying degrees of societal discrimination, some of it severe and longstanding. The approximately 3 million Burakumin (descendants of feudal era "outcasts"), although not subject to governmental discrimination, frequently were victims of entrenched societal discrimination, including restricted access to housing and employment opportunities.

According to the MOJ, there were nearly 1.85 million legal foreign residents as of 2002. The largest group, at approximately 625,400, was ethnic Koreans, followed by Chinese, Brazilians, and Filipinos. Despite improvements in legal safeguards against discrimination, Korean permanent residents (so-called Zainichi Koreans, most of whom were born, raised, and educated in Japan) were subject to various forms of deeply entrenched societal discrimination. Harassment and threats against pro-North Korean organizations and persons reportedly have increased since the 2002 admission by North Korea that it had kidnapped more than a dozen Japanese citizens. Other foreigners also were subject to discrimination. There was a widespread perception among Japanese citizens that foreigners committed many crimes. According to a government survey, more than 70% of citizens worried that an increase in the number of illegally employed foreign workers could undermine public safety and result in human rights abuses against the workers themselves. Nevertheless, more than 80% said the country should accept foreign laborers conditionally or unconditionally.

As of May 2019, Japan has not ratified the Convention against Discrimination in Education.

== Worker rights ==
=== Right of association ===
The Constitution provides for the right of workers to associate freely in unions.

=== Sexual harassment law in the workplace ===
The Equal Employment Opportunity Law of Japan created in 1972 only advises or recommends employers to take measures to prevent sexual harassment. Sexual harassment is the most reported category labor cases at the Ministry of Health, Labour, and Welfare in Japan.

In 1999 the Equal Employment Opportunity Act was revised and a provision was added that required employers to take measures to prevent sexual harassment against women in the workplace. It was revised again in 2007 to include male victims, and it was revised again in 2014 to include same-sex sexual harassment.

=== Right to organize and bargain collectively ===
The Constitution provides unions with the right to organize, bargain, and act collectively.

=== Prohibition of forced or compulsory labor ===
The Constitution provides that no person shall be held in bondage of any kind. Involuntary servitude, except as punishment for crime, is prohibited.

=== Prohibition of child labor ===
The Constitution bans the employment of children.

=== Acceptable work conditions and minimum wage ===
Minimum wages are set on a regional (prefectural) and industry basis, with the input of tripartite (workers, employers, public interest) advisory councils. Employers covered by a minimum wage must post the concerned minimum wages, and compliance with minimum wages was considered widespread. Minimum wage rates ranged according to prefecture from 606 to 710 yen per hour. Minimum wage rates were considered sufficient to provide a worker and family with a decent standard of living.

The Labor Standards Law provides for a 40-hour work week for most industries and mandates premium pay for hours worked over 40 in a week or 8 in a day. However, labor unions frequently criticized the government for failing to enforce maximum working hours regulations in smaller firms. Activist groups claimed that employers exploited or discriminated against foreign workers, who often had little or no knowledge of the Japanese language or their legal rights.

The government tried to reduce the inflow of illegal foreign workers by prosecuting employers of such workers. According to NPA figures, 175 persons were charged with "illegal employment assistance" during the first half of 2002. The immigration law provides for penalties against employers of undocumented foreign workers. Maximum fines for illegal employment assistance were raised to 3 million yen in December. Suspected foreign workers also may be denied entry for passport, visa, and entry application irregularities. The Government continued to study the foreign worker issue, and several citizens' groups were working with illegal foreign workers to improve their access to information on worker rights.

The Ministry of Labor effectively administered various laws and regulations governing occupational health and safety, principal among which is the Industrial Safety and Health Law. Standards were set by the Ministry of Labor and issued after consultation with the Standing Committee on Safety and Health of the Central Labor Standards Council. Labor inspectors have the authority to suspend unsafe operations immediately, and the law provides that workers may voice concerns over occupational safety and remove themselves from unsafe working conditions without jeopardizing their continued employment.

According to new reports from the Business & Human Rights Resource Center, approximately 197 allegations of human rights abuses have been revealed against renewable energy projects. In 2019, a London-based group that promotes human rights, documented 47 attacks, ranging from frivolous lawsuits to violence on individuals who raised concerns about human rights abuses in the industry.

=== Foreign worker issues ===
==== Passport confiscation ====
It is common practice for Japanese companies to take the passport of foreign employees. It is illegal for companies to confiscate passports of Japanese citizens, but not of foreign workers. There are only government guidelines against confiscation. Companies fear that foreign employees could run away. According to activist lawyers, forcing people to work while taking their passports is akin to forced labor. They have implored the Japanese government to make it illegal in order to protect human rights. The specific number of cases is unclear, but many cases are underreported due to language barriers and threats of deportation.

== See also ==
- Ainu people
- Demographics of Japan
- Ethnic issues in Japan
- Flag of Japan
- Freedom of Information Rights in Japan
- Homelessness in Japan
- Homosexuality in Japan
- Human trafficking in Japan
- International child abduction in Japan
- LGBT rights in Japan
- North Korean abductions of Japanese citizens
- Prostitution in Japan
- Raelyn Campbell
- Ryukyuan People
- Ryukyu independence movement
- Women in Japan
- Sex trafficking in Japan

International:

- Human rights in Asia
- Human rights in Europe
- Human rights in Australia
- Human rights in the United States
- Human rights in Russia
- Human rights in China
