= Raelynn =

Raelynn may refer to:

- RaeLynn, stage name of American singer Racheal Lynn Woodward (born 1994)
- Raelyn Campbell, Senior Program Officer for the Asia-Pacific Region at the Bill and Melinda Gates Foundation
- Raelynn Hillhouse, American national security and Intelligence community analyst, former smuggler during the Cold War, spy novelist and health care executive.
- Rae Lynn Job, American politician

== Other uses ==
- Raelynn (given name)
