= Crime in Japan =

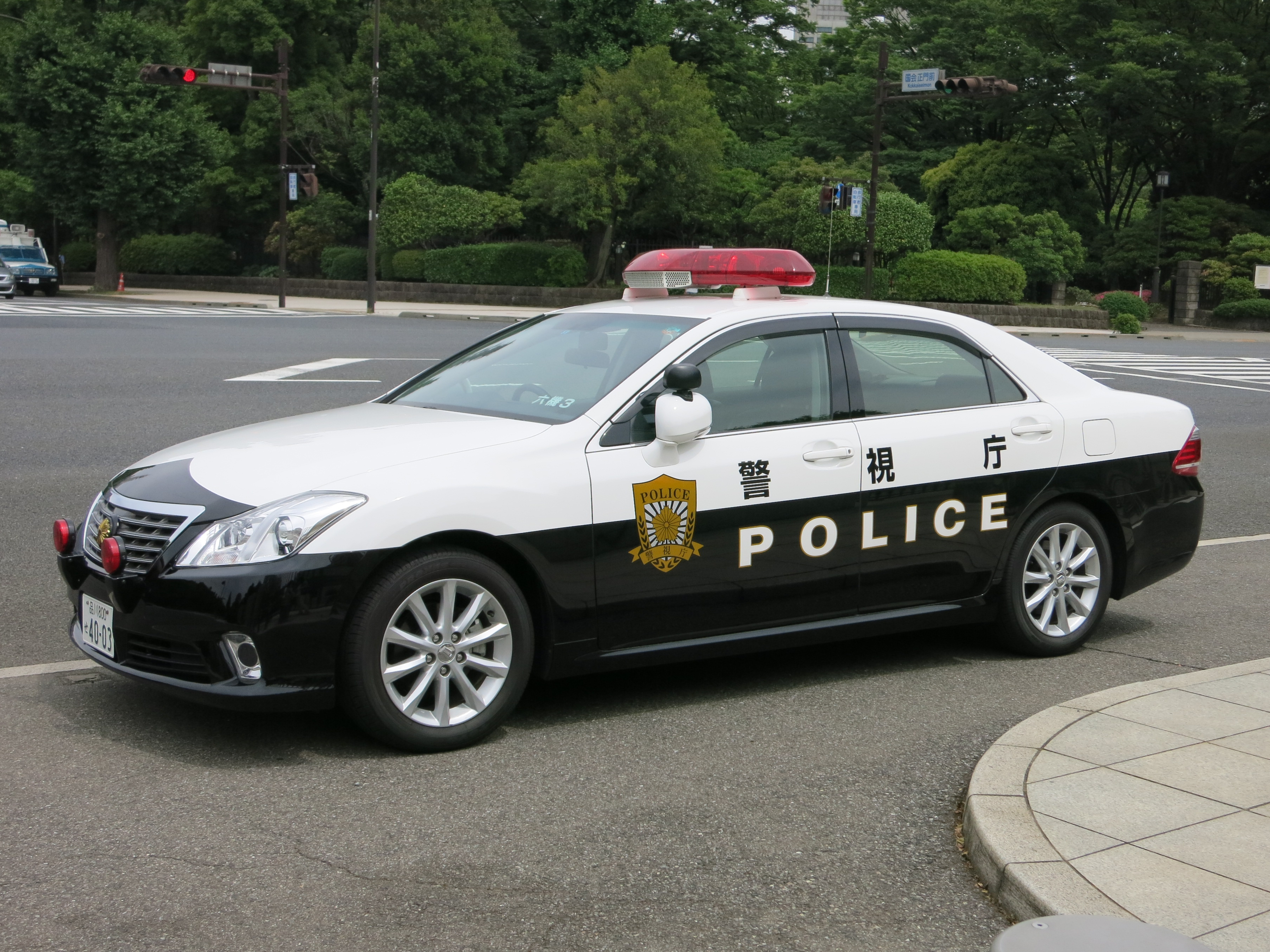
Japanese police car

Crime in Japan has been recorded since at least the 1800s, and has varied over time.

== History ==
Before the Meiji Era, crime was handled often severely at a daimyo level.

== Yakuza ==
The yakuza existed in Japan well before the 1800s and followed codes similar to the samurai. Their early operations were usually close-knit, and the leader and his subordinates had father-son relationships. Although this traditional arrangement continues to exist, yakuza activities are increasingly replaced by modern types of gangs that depend on force and money as organizing concepts. Nonetheless, yakuza often picture themselves as saviors of traditional Japanese virtues in postwar society, sometimes forming ties with traditionalist groups espousing the same views and attracting citizens not satisfied with society.

Yakuza groups in 1990 were estimated to number more than 3,300 and together contained more than 88,000 members. Although concentrated in the largest urban prefectures, yakuza operate in most cities and often receive protection from high-ranking officials. After concerted police pressure in the 1960s, smaller gangs either disappeared or began to consolidate in syndicate-type organizations. In 1990, three large syndicates (Yamaguchi-gumi, Sumiyoshi-kai, Inagawa-kai) dominated organized crime in the nation and controlled more than 1,600 gangs and 42,000 gangsters. Their number has since swelled and shrunk, often coinciding with economic conditions.

The yakuza tradition also spread to the Okinawa Island in the 20th century. The Kyokuryu-kai and the Okinawa Kyokuryu-kai are the two largest known yakuza groups in Okinawa Prefecture and both have been registered as designated bōryokudan groups under the Organized Crime Countermeasures Law since 1992.

Yakuza leader Takeshi Ebisawa, pleaded guilty to trafficking nuclear material that had been smuggled through Myanmar for an illicit arms deal. The deal had involved military weaponry, including air-to-surface missiles. On 9 January 2025, Yakuza confessed in court to his involvement in the trafficking of nuclear material, including weapon-grade plutonium, as disclosed by U.S. Attorney Edward Kim.

=== Pseudo-Yakuza ===
"Pseudo-Yakuza" is a term used to describe individuals or groups that resemble formal crime syndicates like the Yakuza, but lack the organization and structure to be formally classified as such. These groups usually engage in illegal activities such as gambling, extortion, and drug trafficking. Beginning in 2013, the National Police Agency re-classified the Chinese Dragons, Kanto Rengo, and bōsōzoku biker gangs as "pseudo-yakuza" organizations.

== Statistics ==
In 1989 Japan experienced 1.3 robberies and 1.1 murders per 100,000 population. In the same year, Japanese authorities solved 75.9% of robberies and 95.9% of homicides.

In 1990 the police identified over 2.2 million Penal Code violations. Two types of violations — larceny (65.1 percent of total violation) and negligent homicide or injury as a result of accidents (26.2%) — accounted for over 90 percent of criminal offenses.

In 2002, the number of crimes recorded was 2,853,739. This number decreased to less than one-third by 2017 with 915,042 crimes being recorded. In 2013, the overall crime rate in Japan fell for the 11th straight year and the number of murders and attempted murders also fell to a postwar low.

As of 2012, on average there are two gun related homicides per year.

According to the 2024 National Police Agency statistics, Japan's rate of intentional homicide per 100,000 population was one of the lowest in the world at 0.78 per 100,000 inhabitants.

=== Immigration and crime ===
A survey of existing research on immigration and crime in Japan found that "prosecution and sentencing in Japan do seem to result in some disparities by nationality, but the available data are too limited to arrive at confident conclusions about their nature or magnitude". According to a 1997 news report, a large portion of crimes by immigrants are by Chinese in Japan, and some highly publicized crimes by organized groups of Chinese (often with help of Japanese organized crime) have led to a negative public perception of immigrants. According to the National Police Agency in 2015, Vietnamese nationals overtook Chinese as having the highest number of criminal offenses for foreigners. The number of offenses has reportedly been on the rise as of 2021, and has been linked to the lower economic status of Vietnamese in Japan.

== Crimes ==
Of particular concern to the police are crimes associated with modernization. Increased wealth and technological sophistication has brought new white collar crimes, such as computer and credit card fraud, larceny involving coin dispensers, and insurance fraud. Incidence of drug abuse is minuscule, compared with other industrialized nations and limited mainly to stimulants. Japanese law enforcement authorities endeavor to control this problem by extensive coordination with international investigative organizations and stringent punishment of Japanese and foreign offenders. Traffic accidents and fatalities consume substantial law enforcement resources. There is also evidence of foreign criminals traveling from overseas to take advantage of Japan's lax security. In his autobiography Undesirables, English criminal Colin Blaney stated that English thieves have targeted the nation due to the low crime rate and because Japanese people are unprepared for crime. Pakistani, Russian, Sri Lankan, and Burmese car theft gangs have also been known to target the nation.

=== Stabbing ===
In 2025 a series of knife attacks carried out by several teenagers prompted worries that Japanese youth are feeling increasingly stressed and isolated in a highly competitive society. The suspects, from 15 to 17 years old, had targeted family members, classmates, and strangers, resulting in three deaths. Experts are also concerned that people may copy past attacks such as the Ikeda school massacre and the Kawasaki stabbings.

=== Rape ===
Rape has been an issue in Japan since before industrialization. There have been criticisms regarding the lack of justice for and support of victims in the nation.

=== Sex Trafficking ===
Japanese and foreign women and girls have been victims of sex trafficking in Japan. They are raped in brothels and other locations and experience physical and psychological trauma.

== Crime by region ==
Okinawa Prefecture is home to 74% of all US bases in the country and around 26 thousand military personnel. The prefecture saw from, 1972 to 2011, 5,747 criminal cases involving US military personnel, however during the same period the rest of Okinawa's populace had a crime rate more than twice as high — 69.7 crimes per 10,000 people, compared with 27.4 by U.S. military affiliated members.

Local government and treaties, such as the Status of Forces Agreement (SOFA), have been viewed by some to turn a blind eye to crimes perpetrated by US forces, especially of this type and against women. Policies surrounding the punishment of these crimes and the protection of Okinawan women are few and far between, trials are most often handled by military courts-martial. State-led initiatives did not offer much to help face and punish these aggressions, civilians took matters into their own hands, in 1995 a group of women-led protests of over 85,000 people in the capital of the prefecture and started their own organization to protect themselves from these crimes: the Okinawa Women Act Against Military Violence. International actions were taken that same year, following the subsequent political discussion the organization created, the Special Action Committee of Okinawa with representatives from Washington, Okinawa, and Tokyo, decided on a referendum, whereby 21% of military occupied areas should be returned to Okinawa, in the hope of improving diplomatic relations.

As Okinawa's importance continues to increase, and political tensions in the region rise, further compromises by the US military to improve diplomatic relations with the prefecture and Tokyo have been made, through policies to protect Okinawan women, and punish military criminals, can be expected.

== See also ==
- Criminal justice system of Japan
- List of major crimes in Japan
- Human trafficking in Japan
- Ethnic issues in Japan
- List of countries by intentional homicide rate
