= Human trafficking in Japan =

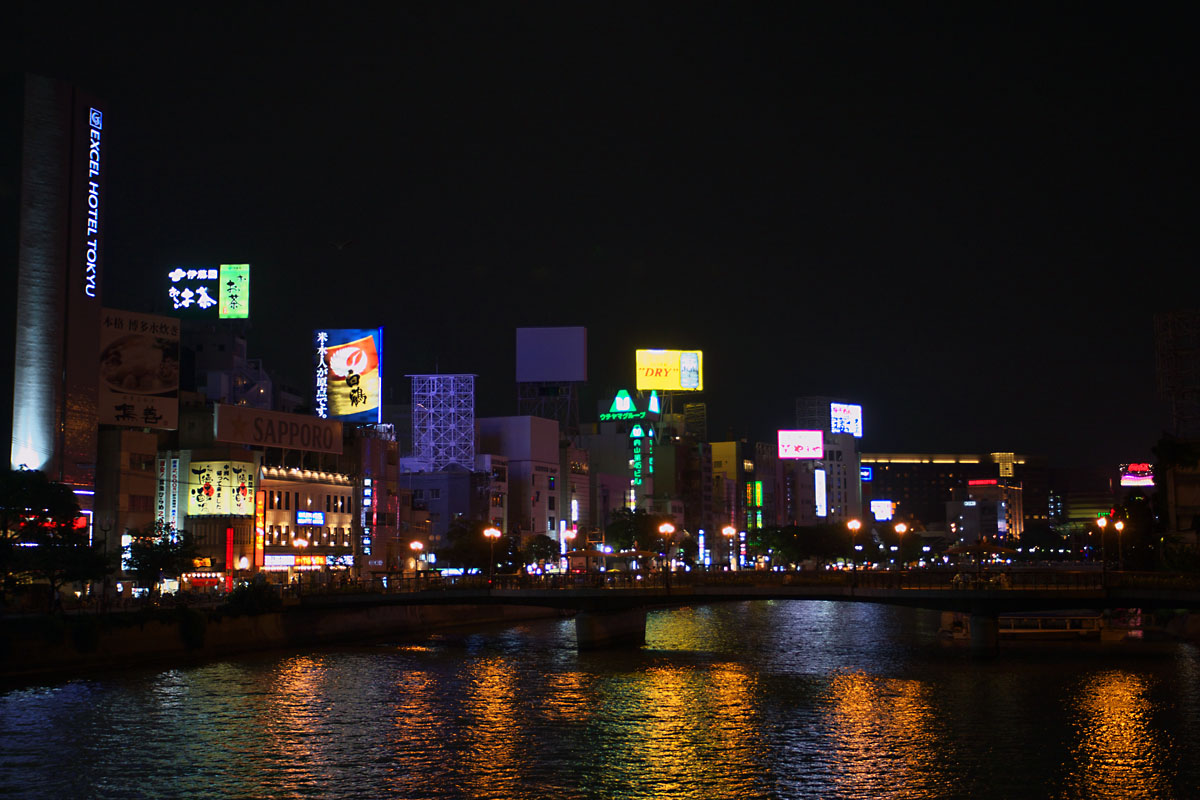
- Red-light districts are popular hangouts for sex workers. (Nakasu, Fukuoka)
- Sources: Japan, China, Southeast Asia, South Asia, Post-Soviet states, Latin America
- Perpetrators: Snakehead, Yakuza, Russian mafia, Triads, Iranian gangs, Nigerian gangs, American gangs

According to the United States' State Department, Japan is a major destination, source, and transit country for men and women subjected to forced labor and sex trafficking. Victims of human trafficking include male and female migrant workers, women and children lured to Japan by fraudulent marriages and forced into prostitution, as well as Japanese nationals, "particularly runaway teenage girls and foreign-born children of Japanese citizens who acquired nationality." 'According to the 2024 U.S. State Department's Trafficking in Persons Report, The Government of Japan does not fully meet the minimum standards for the elimination of trafficking but is making significant efforts to do so.'

U.S. State Department's Office to Monitor and Combat Trafficking in Persons placed the country in "Tier 2" in 2024. Japan ratified the 2000 UN TIP Protocol on July 11, 2017.

In 2005 Irene Khan, then the Secretary General of Amnesty International, stated that the country received the largest number of trafficked persons globally, with the most common points of origin of victims being Southeast Asia, Eastern Europe, and South America.

== History ==
Karayuki-san was the name given to Japanese girls and women in the late 19th and early 20th centuries who were trafficked from poverty stricken agricultural prefectures in Japan to destinations in East Asia, Southeast Asia, Siberia (Russian Far East), Manchuria, and British India to serve as prostitutes and sexually serviced men from a variety of races, including Chinese, Europeans, native Southeast Asians, and others.

Trafficking was also present in the form of obtaining citizens from Korea during the Imjin War. During this, the Japanese military abducted an estimated 1.5% of Korean Citizens and mainly took teenagers. After the war, some prisoners were returned but those released were primarily males even though the ratio of male to female taken was comparable to one another.

There was also significant involvement of trafficking alongside foreigners via the Portuguese Slave Trade. In cities such as Nagasaki and Hirado the Portuguese not only sold slaves but also bought Japanese slaves to be shipped elsewhere in the world. Many Japanese that were sold through Nagasaki were captured from other areas of the country. Buyers were referred to as hitokai (人買) and the brokers were referred to as hitoakibito (人商人).

== Sex trafficking ==
Japanese and foreign women and girls have been victims of sex trafficking in Japan. They are raped in brothels and other locations and experience physical and psychological trauma. Sex work during the late medieval period moved away from familial control to having prostitutes moved around by pimps. Women during this period would also be taken when a family would be conquered by another. The women who were abducted from Korea during the Imjin War were likely used as concubines or utilized for other forms of sex work.

Urbanization also caused an increase in sex trafficking. As cities grew and men moved to live in urban settings, the demand for sex work increased drastically. When women were taken into cities, they would often be prostituted in designated pleasure districts (Yūkaku). Women were also accepted as collateral on loans by moneylenders since they were seen as property.

== Labor trafficking ==
Japan has a declining population, and is therefore experiencing an extreme labor shortage. As a result, it is an attractive destination for foreign migrant workers, especially from South East Asian countries. Many workers enter the country on a student visa as part of the Technical Intern Training Program, a government sanctioned program where workers can learn a trade while earning a living. The original intent of the program was positive, but due to many loopholes there is widespread exploitation of the vulnerability of workers. The government has now decided to abandon the program, but it will take several years to implement the changes and critics are not convinced that it will solve the problem.

== Child trafficking in Japan ==
The commercial sexual exploitation of children (CSEC) in Japan take the form of exploiting children under 18 for prostitution or child sexual abuse material. Increasingly, children are also the victims of online sextortion, coerced into producing nude images or videos of themselves and then extorted for money or more images. These images may be sold online or on the dark web.

The sexual objectification of children through manga, anime and other art forms is normalized in society, and the general public does not consider it to contribute to the physical exploitation of children. This kind of content is not illegal in Japan.

In performing arts, sexual objectification of children is also normalized in the country's J-POP Idol industry. The decades long sex trafficking of Japanese boys by Johnny Kitagawa was exposed in a BBC documentary in 2023, and came as a huge shock to the nation.

== NGOs combating trafficking in Japan ==
The Japan Network Against Trafficking In Persons (JNATIP) consists of a number of NGOs that provide a wide range of services to trafficking survivors. The members work together to advocate for policy reform and offer an annual seminar in Japanese that is open to the public.

== How to report potential human trafficking ==
- The Immigration Services Agency provides an online form where you can report incidents of visa policy violations, which may be connected to human trafficking. This form is in Japanese only.
- The Japanese government releases a poster annually to raise awareness about human trafficking, and provide a hotline for victims.
- The government provides a One Stop Support Center for victims of sexual crimes and sexual violence. When in trouble, a victim can simply call #8891 from their phone and their call will be redirected to the nearest center. The full list of centers is available here.
- The Internet Hotline Center (IHC) receives reports on behalf of the National Police Agency of all online illegal content, including human trafficking, child sexual abuse images or ads that meet the definition of illegal prostitution. URLs can be reported anonymously through their website.
- PAPS, and NGO combating online sexual violence, receives reports and offers consultations via phone or through their website in multiple languages.
- ZOE Japan, an NGO focused on children under 18 offers an online reporting form in Japanese or English through their website.

== See also ==
- Sex trafficking in Japan
- Human rights in Japan § Trafficking of persons
- Crime in Japan
- Polaris Project
- Jake Adelstein
