= Raelynn (given name) =

- Gender: feminine

Origin
- Origin: English
- Meaning: Combination of Rae and Lynn

Raelynn is a feminine given name of English origin, a modern combination of the names Rae and Lynn. Names ending in -lyn are currently popular for girls in the United States.

== Popularity ==
The name has been among the top one thousand names for girls in the United States since 2008, among the top five hundred names since 2011, and among the top one hundred and fifty names since 2017.

Variants of the name in use include Raelin, Raelinn, Raelyn, Raelynne, Railyn, Railynn, Ralyn, Rayelynn, Raylan, Raylen, Raylenn, Raylin, Raylinn, Raylon, Raylyn, Raylynn, Raylynne, Reylin, Reylynn, Rhaelyn, and Rhaelynn.

== Notable people ==
- RaeLynn, stage name of American singer Racheal Lynn Woodward (born 1994)
- Raelyn Campbell, Senior Program Officer for the Asia-Pacific Region at the Bill and Melinda Gates Foundation
- Raelynn Hillhouse, American national security and Intelligence community analyst, former smuggler during the Cold War, spy novelist and health care executive.
- Rae Lynn Job, American politician
