= Sexual assault =

Act of sexual abuse

Sexual assault (SA) is an act of sexual abuse in which one person intentionally sexually touches another person without that person's consent, or coerces or physically forces a person to engage in a sexual act against their will. It is a form of sexual violence that includes child sexual abuse, groping (forcing unsolicited, sexualized touching onto another person), rape (forced sexual penetration, no matter how slight), forced kissing, drug facilitated sexual assault, or the torture of the person in a sexual manner often with nudity as a precursor.

== Definition ==
Generally, sexual assault is defined as unwanted sexual contact. The National Center for Victims of Crime states:

Sexual assault takes many forms including attacks such as rape or attempted rape, as well as any unwanted sexual contact or threats. Usually a sexual assault occurs when someone touches any part of another person's body in a sexual way, even through clothes, without that person's consent.

In the United States, the definition of sexual assault varies widely among the individual states. However, in most states sexual assault occurs when there is lack of consent from one of the individuals involved. Consent must take place between two adults who are not incapacitated and consent may change, by being withdrawn, at any time during the sexual act. Sexual assault can be defined as violation of consent according to standards of substantive equality or formal equality.

== Types ==
=== Child sexual abuse ===
Child sexual abuse is a form of child abuse in which an adult or older adolescent abuses a child for sexual stimulation. Forms of child sexual abuse include asking or pressuring a child to engage in sexual activities (regardless of the outcome), actual sexual contact against a child, physical contact with the child's genitals, or using a child to produce child pornography, including live streaming sexual abuse.

The effects of child sexual abuse include depression, post-traumatic stress disorder, anxiety, propensity to re-victimization in adulthood, physical injury to the child, and increased risk for future interpersonal violence perpetration among males, among other problems. Sexual assault among teenagers has been shown to lead to worse school performance, an increase in mental health problems, and social exclusion. Sexual abuse by a family member is a form of incest. It is more common than other forms of sexual assault on a child and can result in more serious and long-term psychological trauma, especially in the case of parental incest.

Approximately 15 to 25 percent of women and 5 to 15 percent of men were sexually abused when they were children. Most sexual abuse offenders are acquainted with their victims. Approximately 30 percent of the perpetrators are relatives of the child – most often brothers, sisters, fathers, mothers, uncles, aunts or cousins. Around 60 percent are other acquaintances such as friends of the family, babysitters, or neighbors. Strangers are the offenders in approximately 10 percent of child sexual abuse cases.

Studies have shown that the psychological damage is particularly severe when sexual assault is committed by parents against children due to the incestuous nature of the assault. Incest between a child and a related adult has been identified as the most widespread form of child sexual abuse with a huge capacity for damage to a child. Often, sexual assault on a child is not reported by the child for several of the following reasons:

- children are too young to recognize their victimization or put it into words
- they were threatened or bribed by the abuser
- they feel confused by fearing the abuser
- they are afraid no one will believe them
- they blame themselves or believe the abuse is a punishment
- they feel guilty for consequences to the perpetrator

In addition, many states have criminalized sexual contact between teachers or school administrators and students, even if the student is over the age of consent.

=== Domestic violence ===
Domestic violence is violence or other abuse by one person against another in a domestic setting, such as in marriage or cohabitation. It is strongly correlated with sexual assault. Not only can domestic abuse be emotional, physical, psychological and financial, but it can be sexual. Some of the signs of sexual abuse are similar to those of domestic violence.

=== Elderly sexual assault ===
About 30 percent of people age 65 or older who are sexually assaulted in the U.S. report it to the police. Assailants may include strangers, caretakers, adult children, spouses and fellow facility residents, although perpetrators of elder sexual assault are less likely to be related to the victim than perpetrators of other types of elder abuse.

=== Groping ===
Groping is a type of sexual assault with the touching or fondling of another person in a sexual way without the person's consent. Groping may occur under or over clothing.

=== Rape ===
Outside of law, the term rape (sexual intercourse or other forms of sexual penetration carried out against a person without that person's consent) is often used interchangeably with sexual assault. Although closely related, the two terms are technically distinct in most jurisdictions. Sexual assault typically includes rape and other forms of non-consensual sexual activity.

Abbey et al. state that female victims are much more likely to be assaulted by an acquaintance, such as a friend or co-worker, a dating partner, an ex-boyfriend or a husband or other intimate partner than by a complete stranger. In a study of hospital emergency room treatments for rape, Kaufman et al. stated that the male victims as a group sustained more physical trauma and were more likely to have been a victim of multiple assaults from multiple assailants. It was also stated that male victims were more likely to have been held captive longer.

In the U.S., rape is a crime committed primarily against women, with 27% of women having reported an experience that meets the definition of rape A national telephone survey on violence against women conducted by the National Institute of Justice and the Centers for Disease Control and Prevention found that 18% of women surveyed had experienced a completed or attempted rape at some time in their lives. Of these, 22% were younger than 12 years and 32% were between 12 and 17 years old when they were first raped. In the U.K., attempted rape under the Criminal Attempts Act 1981 is a 'sexual offence' within section 31(1) of the Criminal Justice Act 1991. The removal of a condom during intercourse without the consent of the sex partner, known as stealthing, may be treated as a sexual assault or rape in some jurisdictions.

=== Sexual harassment ===
Sexual harassment is intimidation, bullying or coercion of a sexual nature. It may also be defined as the unwelcome or inappropriate promise of rewards in exchange for sexual favors. The legal and social definition of what constitutes sexual harassment differ widely by culture. Sexual harassment includes a wide range of behaviors from seemingly mild transgressions to serious forms of abuse. Some forms of sexual harassment overlap with sexual assault.

In the United States, sexual harassment is a form of discrimination which violates Title VII of the Civil Rights Act of 1964. According to the Equal Employment Opportunity Commission (EEOC): "Unwelcome sexual advances, requests for sexual favors, and other verbal or physical conduct of a sexual nature constitutes sexual harassment when submission to or rejection of this conduct explicitly or implicitly affects an individual's employment, unreasonably interferes with an individual's work performance or creates an intimidating, hostile or offensive work environment." In the United States:

- 79% of victims are women, 21% are men
  - 51% are harassed by a supervisor
  - Business, Trade, Banking, and Finance are the biggest industries where sexual harassment occurs
  - 12% received threats of termination if they did not comply with their requests
- 26,000 people in the armed forces were assaulted in 2012^{[18]}
  - 302 of the 2,558 cases pursued by victims were prosecuted
  - 38% of the cases were committed by someone of a higher rank
- Sexual harassment is a form of sex discrimination that violates Title VII of the Civil Rights Act of 1964.
  - Title VII of the Civil Rights Act of 1964 is a federal law that prohibits employers from discriminating against employees on the basis of sex, race, color, national origin, and religion. It generally applies to employers with 15 or more employees, including federal, state, and local governments. Title VII also applies to private and public colleges and universities, employment agencies, and labor organizations.^{[19]}
  - "It shall be an unlawful employment practice for an employer [...] to discriminate against any individual with respect to his compensation, terms, conditions, or privileges of employment, because of such individual's race, color, religion, sex, or national origin."

=== Mass sexual assault ===
Mass sexual assault takes place in public places and in crowds. It involves large group of people surrounding and assaulting the victim(s) and engaging in conduct such as groping, manual penetration, frottage, and rape.

=== Sexual coercion and sexual assault ===
Force is not the primary tactic used by perpetrators of sexual assault, but coercion; with alcohol and verbal coercion being common tactics. Examples of verbal coercion can range from threats, guilting, lies, etc. Sexual coercion may cause a person to agree to sex they do not want. This is also referred to as; "Working the Yes Out".Trust and a previous relationship with the victim are factors exploited by perpetrators while using coercion as a means to commit sexual assault. This supports that, in the context of the United States, acquaintance rape makes up about 2/3rds of rapes reported. Coercion with alcohol is when alcohol is used to disable a target's ability to give or withdraw consent. Of Perpetrators who used sexual coercion, 94% were male. The NISVS reported that 96% precent of rapists and sexual abusers were male.

== Emotional and psychological effects ==
Aside from physical traumas, rape and other sexual assault often result in long-term emotional effects, particularly in child victims. These can include, but are not limited to: denial, learned helplessness, genophobia (fear of sex), anger, self-blame, anxiety, shame, nightmares, fear, depression, flashbacks, guilt, rationalization, moodswings, numbness, hypersexuality, loneliness, social anxiety, difficulty trusting oneself or others, and difficulty concentrating.

Sexual assault increases an individual's risk to developing psychopathology. It is most strongly related to the development of suicidality and trauma-related disorders (including post-traumatic stress disorder), as well as the development of bipolar and obsessive–compulsive disorders. Experiencing sexual assault also increases the risk of developing anxiety disorders, major depressive disorder, eating disorders, addiction, or other psychopathologies. Individuals who develop psychological disorders following sexual assault have increased frequency and severity of psychopathology compared with individuals who have not experienced sexual assault. Family and friends of individuals who have been sexually assaulted experience emotional scarring, including a strong desire for revenge, a desire to "fix" the problem or move on, and a rationalization that "it wasn't that bad".

== Physical effects ==
While sexual assault, including rape, can result in physical trauma, many people who experience sexual assault will not suffer any physical injury. Rape myths suggest that the stereotypical victim of sexual violence is a bruised and battered young woman. The central issue in many cases of rape or other sexual assault is whether both parties consented to the sexual activity or whether both parties had the capacity to do so. Thus, physical force resulting in visible physical injury is not always seen. This stereotype can be damaging because people who have experienced sexual assault but have no physical trauma may be less inclined to report to the authorities or to seek health care. However, women who experienced rape or physical violence by a partner were more likely than people who had not experienced this violence to report frequent headaches, chronic pain, difficulty sleeping, activity limitation, poor physical health, and poor mental health.

== Economic effects ==
Due to rape or sexual assault, or the threat of, there are many resulting impacts on income and commerce at the macro level. Excluding child abuse, each rape or sexual assault costs $5,100 in tangible losses (lost productivity, medical and mental health care, police/fire services, and property damage) and $81,400 in lost quality of life. This issue has been addressed in the U.S. Supreme Court. In his dissenting opinion of the U.S. Supreme Court case U.S. v. Morrison, Justice Souter explained that 75% of women never go to the movies alone at night and nearly 50% will not ride public transportation out of fear of rape or sexual assault. It also stated that less than 1% of victims collect damages and 50% of women lose their jobs or quit after the trauma. The court ruled in U.S. v. Morrison that Congress did not have the authority to enact part of the Violence Against Women Act because it did not have a direct impact on commerce. The Commerce Clause of Article I Section VII of the U.S. Constitution gives authority and jurisdiction to the Federal government in matters of interstate commerce. As a result, the victim was unable to sue her attacker in Federal Court.

Sexual assault also has adverse economic effects for survivors on the micro level. For instance, survivors of sexual assault often require time off from work and face increased rates of unemployment. Survivors of rape by an intimate partner lose an average of $69 per day due to unpaid time off from work. Sexual assault is also associated with numerous negative employment consequences, including unpaid time off, diminished work performance, job loss, and inability to work, all of which can lead to lower earnings for survivors. The ability to test backlogged sexual assault kits and have the results uploaded into CODIS is cost effective in terms of reducing the costs associated with sexual assaults' by spending the money on testing evidence.

== Treatment of victims ==
In the emergency room, emergency contraceptive medications are offered to women raped by men because about 5% of such rapes result in pregnancy. Preventative medication against sexually transmitted infections are given to victims of all types of sexual assault (especially for the most common diseases like chlamydia, gonorrhea, trichomoniasis and bacterial vaginosis) and a blood serum is collected to test for STIs (such as HIV, hepatitis B and syphilis). Any survivor with abrasions are immunized for tetanus if five years have elapsed since the last immunization. Short-term treatment with a benzodiazepine may help with acute anxiety and antidepressants may be helpful for symptoms of PTSD, depression and panic attacks. Eye movement desensitization and reprocessing (EMDR) has also been proposed as a psychiatric treatment for victims of sexual assault. With regard to long term psychological treatment, prolonged exposure therapy has been tested as a method of long-term PTSD treatment for victims of sexual abuse.

== Mistreatment of victims ==
After the assault, victims may become the target of slut-shaming to cyberbullying. In addition, their credibility may be challenged. During criminal proceedings, publication bans and rape shield laws may operate to protect victims from excessive public scrutiny. Negative social responses to victims' disclosures of sexual assault have the potential to lead to post-traumatic stress disorder symptoms. Social isolation, following a sexual assault, can result in the victim experiencing a decrease in their self-esteem and likelihood of rejecting unwanted sexual advances in the future. Victims have already been through a traumatic assault and it can be exacerbated the unwillingness of law enforcement to move their case along in the forensic testing process because law enforcement officials develop preconceived notions about the victims willingness to participate in the investigation.

== Prevention ==
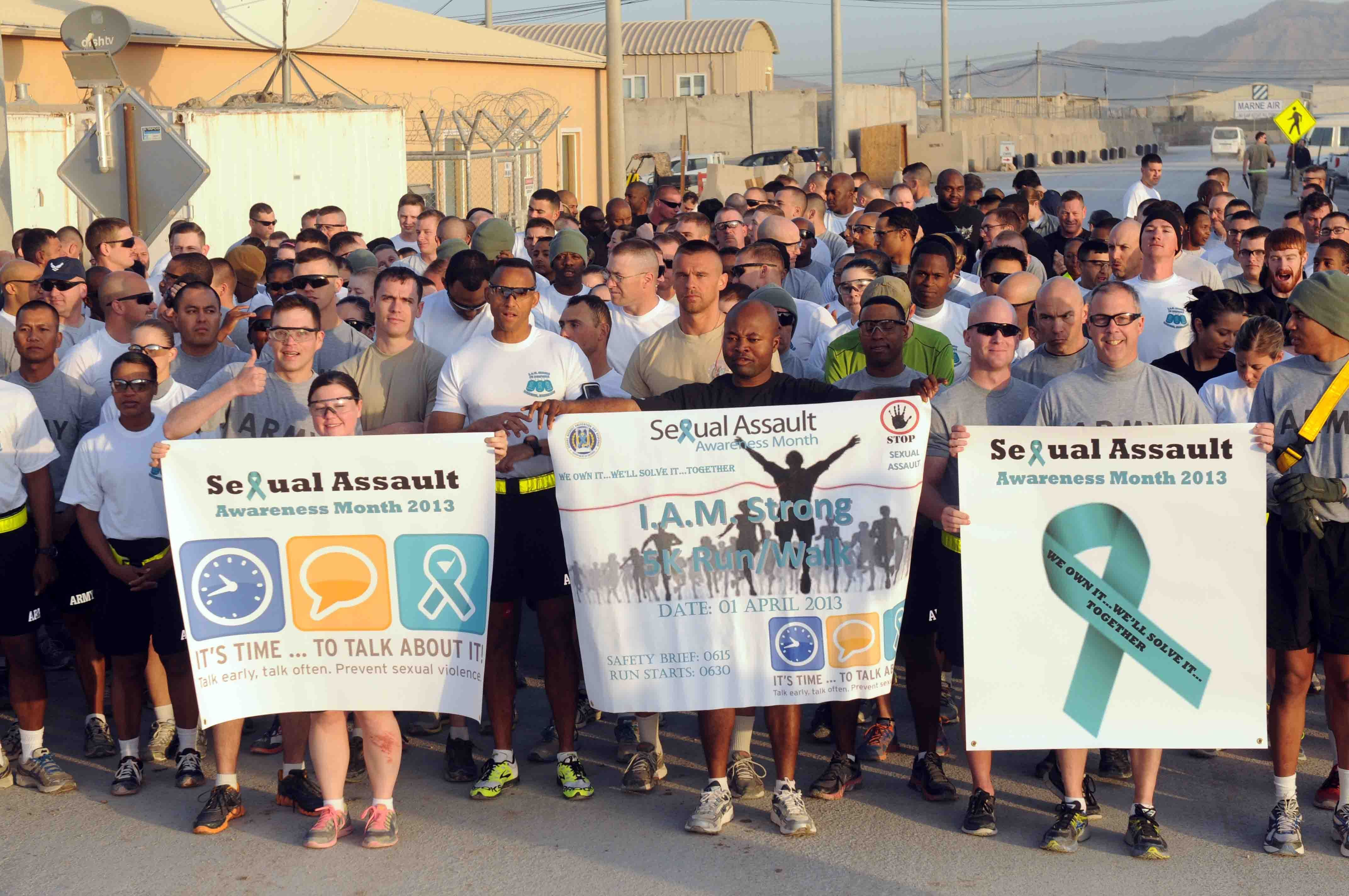
U.S. troops in Afghanistan hold a 5K run/walk for Sexual Assault Awareness Month.

Sexual harassment and assault may be prevented by secondary school, college, workplace and public education programs. At least one program for fraternity men produced "sustained behavioral change". At least one study showed that creative campaigns with attention grabbing slogans and images that market consent are effective tools to raise awareness of campus sexual assault and related issues.

Several research-based rape prevention programs have been tested and verified through scientific studies, and several rape prevention programs have the strongest empirical data in the research literature. The Men's and Women's Programs, also known as the One in Four programs, were written by John Foubert. and is focused on increasing empathy toward rape survivors and motivating people to intervene as bystanders in sexual assault situations. Published data shows that high-risk persons who saw the Men's and Women's Program committed 40% fewer acts of sexually coercive behavior than those who did not. They also committed acts of sexual coercion that were eight times less severe than a control group. Further research also shows that people who saw the Men's and Women's Program reported more efficacy in intervening and greater willingness to help as a bystander after seeing the program. Several additional studies are available documenting its efficacy.

Bringing in the Bystander was written by Victoria Banyard. Its focus is on who bystanders are, when they have helped, and how to intervene as a bystander in risky situations. The program includes a brief empathy induction component and a pledge to intervene in the future. Several studies show strong evidence of favorable outcomes including increased bystander efficacy, increased willingness to intervene as a bystander, and decreased rape myth acceptance. The MVP: Mentors in Violence Prevention was written by Jackson Katz. This program focuses on discussing a male bystander who did not intervene when a woman was in danger. An emphasis is placed on encouraging men to be active bystanders, rather than standing by when they notice abuse. The bulk of the presentation is on processing hypothetical scenarios. Outcomes reported in research literature include lower levels of sexism and increased belief that participants could prevent violence against women.

The Green Dot Bystander Intervention program was written by Dorothy Edwards. This program includes both motivational speeches and peer education focused on bystander intervention. Outcomes show that program participation is associated with reductions in rape myth acceptance and increased bystander intervention. The city of Edmonton, Canada, initiated a public education campaign aimed at potential perpetrators. Posters in bar bathrooms and public transit centers reminded men that "It's not sex when she's wasted" and "It's not sex when he changes his mind". The campaign was so effective that it spread to other cities. "The number of reported sexual assaults fell by 10 per cent last year in Vancouver, after the ads were featured around the city. It was the first time in several years that there was a drop in sexual assault activity."

President Barack Obama and Vice President Joe Biden introduced in September 2014 a nationwide campaign against sexual assault entitled "It's on us". The campaign includes tips against sexual assault, as well as broad scale of private and public pledges to change to provoke a cultural shift, with a focus on student activism, to achieve awareness and prevention nationwide. UC Berkeley, NCAA and Viacom have publicly announced their partnership. Additionally, CODIS checks whether the qualifying offense sample, DNA taken from an offender for committing a crime, was also a sexual assault. If a person committed sexual offenses in the past, this system would reveal a pattern of serial sexual offending. Using CODIS to compare backlogged rape kit tests can lead to prevention of future sexual assaults.

== Prevalence ==
=== Reported by country ===
United Nations Office on Drugs and Crime (UNODC) reports compiled from government sources show that more than 250,000 cases of sexual violence were reported to the police annually. The annual recorded sexual assaults per capita for the last available year is shown below for individual countries. The United Nations Office on Drugs and Crime categorizes sexual assault and rape as distinct forms of sexual violence, hence the below statistics on sexual assault exclude rape. Definitions of sexual assault differs between countries.

| Country | Sexual assaults per 100,000 | Year |
|---|---|---|
| Albania | 2.5 | 2023 |
| Algeria | 0.5 | 2023 |
| Andorra | 14.4 | 2019 |
| Antigua and Barbuda | 26.8 | 2023 |
| Argentina | 70.7 | 2023 |
| Armenia | 0.5 | 2023 |
| Austria | 30.7 | 2023 |
| Azerbaijan | 0.1 | 2021 |
| Bahamas | 2.5 | 2022 |
| Barbados | 25.5 | 2023 |
| Belarus | 3.1 | 2019 |
| Belgium | 61.6 | 2023 |
| Belize | 14.9 | 2022 |
| Benin | 0.1 | 2017 |
| Bermuda | 67.6 | 2017 |
| Bhutan | 5.6 | 2020 |
| Bolivia | 27.2 | 2023 |
| Bosnia and Herzegovina | 2.3 | 2023 |
| Brazil | 4.2 | 2020 |
| Bulgaria | 8.1 | 2023 |
| Cabo Verde | 12.5 | 2018 |
| Canada | 93.2 | 2023 |
| Chile | 71.7 | 2023 |
| Colombia | 11.1 | 2023 |
| Costa Rica | 131.8 | 2023 |
| Croatia | 9.2 | 2023 |
| Cyprus | 2.2 | 2023 |
| Czech Republic | 0.9 | 2023 |
| Denmark | 73.8 | 2023 |
| Dominica | 75.2 | 2023 |
| Dominican Republic | 20.6 | 2023 |
| East Timor | 8.3 | 2015 |
| Ecuador | 53.5 | 2023 |
| El Salvador | 23.5 | 2022 |
| England and Wales | 125.9 | 2022 |
| Estonia | 17.2 | 2023 |
| Eswatini | 8.6 | 2021 |
| Finland | 66.5 | 2023 |
| France | 72.2 | 2023 |
| Germany | 46.8 | 2023 |
| Ghana | 0.1 | 2020 |
| Greece | 6.7 | 2023 |
| Grenada | 26.5 | 2023 |
| Guatemala | 15.6 | 2023 |
| Guinea-Bissau | 3.8 | 2014 |
| Guyana | 7.4 | 2023 |
| Honduras | 8.6 | 2023 |
| Hong Kong | 15.6 | 2023 |
| Iceland | 18.1 | 2023 |
| Indonesia | 1.0 | 2022 |
| Ireland | 37.3 | 2023 |
| Israel | 65.2 | 2023 |
| Jamaica | 30.9 | 2023 |
| Japan | 4.9 | 2023 |
| Jordan | 8.1 | 2023 |
| Kazakhstan | 2.0 | 2017 |
| Kenya | 0.7 | 2022 |
| Kosovo | 4.2 | 2021 |
| Kyrgyzstan | 0.1 | 2018 |
| Latvia | 14.9 | 2023 |
| Lebanon | 0.0 | 2023 |
| Liechtenstein | 18.6 | 2016 |
| Lithuania | 3.1 | 2023 |
| Luxembourg | 51.4 | 2014 |
| Macau | 17.3 | 2022 |
| Madagascar | 1.6 | 2015 |
| Malaysia | 1.5 | 2023 |
| Maldives | 68.7 | 2017 |
| Malta | 17.6 | 2023 |
| Mexico | 43.1 | 2023 |
| Moldova | 2.4 | 2023 |
| Monaco | 0.0 | 2016 |
| Mongolia | 0.0 | 2023 |
| Montenegro | 3.9 | 2023 |
| Morocco | 13.8 | 2023 |
| Myanmar | 0.1 | 2023 |
| Namibia | 0.2 | 2021 |
| Nepal | 1.8 | 2016 |
| Netherlands | 14.1 | 2023 |
| New Zealand | 56.3 | 2023 |
| Northern Ireland | 99.7 | 2023 |
| Norway | 45.1 | 2023 |
| Oman | 3.2 | 2023 |
| Palestine | 2.2 | 2023 |
| Panama | 0.2 | 2022 |
| Paraguay | 12.7 | 2018 |
| Peru | 39.1 | 2022 |
| Philippines | 0.1 | 2023 |
| Poland | 1.0 | 2023 |
| Portugal | 26.1 | 2023 |
| Puerto Rico | 24.8 | 2017 |
| Qatar | 4.0 | 2021 |
| Romania | 2.9 | 2023 |
| Russia | 7.0 | 2020 |
| Saint Kitts and Nevis | 62.0 | 2023 |
| Saint Lucia | 26.2 | 2023 |
| Saudi Arabia | 12.3 | 2019 |
| Scotland | 93.8 | 2023 |
| Senegal | 1.7 | 2015 |
| Serbia | 6.6 | 2023 |
| Slovakia | 1.3 | 2023 |
| Slovenia | 4.1 | 2023 |
| South Africa | 11.8 | 2017 |
| Spain | 29.7 | 2023 |
| Sri Lanka | 3.3 | 2019 |
| St. Vincent and Grenadines | 38.5 | 2023 |
| Suriname | 19.2 | 2023 |
| Sweden | 101.7 | 2023 |
| Switzerland | 7.6 | 2023 |
| Syria | 0.1 | 2018 |
| Tanzania | 1.8 | 2015 |
| Thailand | 1.9 | 2023 |
| Trinidad and Tobago | 2.4 | 2020 |
| Turkey | 9.7 | 2023 |
| Uganda | 1.3 | 2016 |
| United Arab Emirates | 1.9 | 2022 |
| Uruguay | 83.2 | 2023 |
| Uzbekistan | 0.5 | 2021 |
| Vatican City | 0.0 | 2023 |
| Zimbabwe | 30.7 | 2023 |

=== United States ===
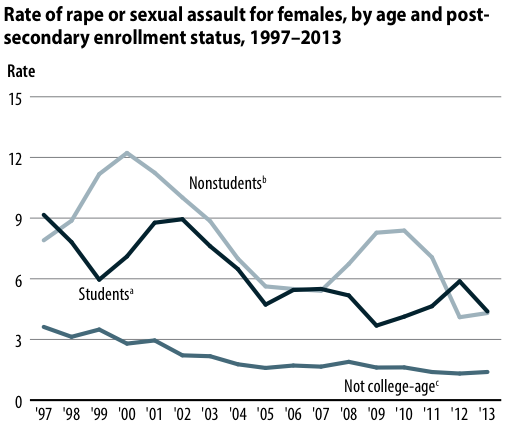
Reported rates in the United States (BJS)

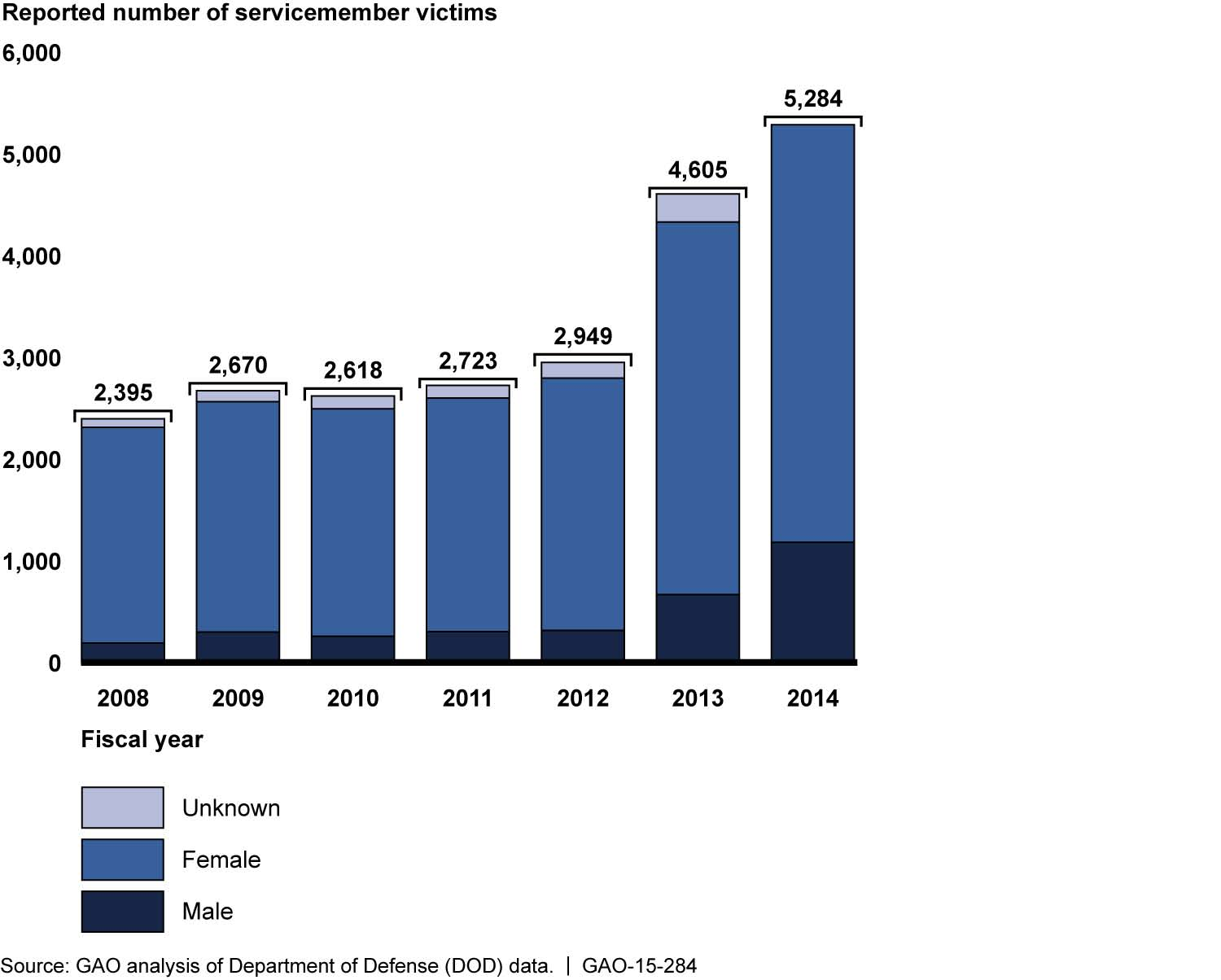
Reported rates in US armed services

The U.S. Department of Justice's National Crime Victimization Survey states that on average there are 237,868 victims (age 12 or older) of sexual assault and rape each year. According to RAINN, every 107 seconds someone in America is sexually assaulted. Sexual assault in the United States military also is a salient issue. Some researchers assert that the unique professional and socially-contained context of military service can heighten the destructive nature of sexual assault, and, therefore, improved support is needed for these victims. The victims of sexual assault:

Age

- 15% are under the age of 12
- 29% are age 12–17
  - 44% are under age 18
- 80% are under age 30
- 12–34 are the highest risk years

By gender

- According to NISVS, 25% of women have met the definition of rape in the United States.
- About 8% of men have reported being the victim of sexual violence, including rape at about 2%, in the United States
- 99% of heterosexual women report only male perpetrators of sexual violence.

LGBT

LGBT identifying individuals, with the exception of lesbian women, are more likely to experience sexual assault on college campuses than heterosexual individuals.

- 1 in 8 lesbian women and nearly 50% of bisexual women and men experience sexual assault in their lifetime.
- Nearly 4 in 10 gay men experience sexual violence in their lifetime.
- 64% of transgender people have experienced sexual assault in their lifetime.

Effects

- 3 times more likely to have depression
- 6 times more likely to have post-traumatic stress disorder
- 13 times more likely to abuse alcohol
- 26 times more likely to abuse drugs
- 4 times more likely to contemplate suicide

Criminal justice

On average 68% of sexual assaults are estimated to be unreported. The conviction rate for violent sexual assault varies by location around 1-8%. The clearance rate for sexual assault is lower than most violent crimes.

Assailants

According to the U.S. Department of Justice 1997 Sex Offenses and Offenders Study:

- A rapist's age on average is 31 years old
- 52% of offenders are white
- 22% of rapists imprisoned report that they are married
- Juveniles accounted for 16% of forcible rape arrestees in 1995 and 17% of those arrested for other sex offenses

In 2001:

- 11% of rapes involved the use of a weapon
  - 3% used a gun
  - 6% used a knife
  - 2% used another form of weapon
- 84% of victims reported the use of physical force only

According to the U.S. Department of Justice 2005 National Crime Victimization Study:

- About 2/3 of rapes were committed by someone known to the victim
- 73% of sexual assaults were perpetrated by a non-stranger
- 38% of rapists are a friend or acquaintance
- 28% are an intimate partner
- 7% are a relative

College

In the United States, several studies since 1987 have indicated that one in four college women have experienced rape or attempted rape at some point in their lifetime. These studies are based on anonymous surveys of college women, not reports to the police, and the results are disputed. In 2015, Texas A&M University professor Jason Lindo and his colleagues analyzed over two decades worth of FBI data, noting that reports of rape increased 15–57% around the times of major American football games at Division 1 schools while attempting to find a link between campus rape and alcohol.

A 2006 report from the U.S. Department of Justice titled "The Sexual Victimization of College Women" reports that 3.1% of undergraduates survived rape or attempted rape during a 6–7 month academic year with an additional 10.1% surviving rape prior to college and an additional 10.9% surviving attempted rape prior to college. With no overlap between these groups, these percentages add to 24.1%, or "One in Four". Koss, Gidycz & Wisniewski published a study in 1987 where they interviewed approximately 6,000 college students on 32 college campuses nationwide. They asked several questions covering a wide range of behaviors. From this study 15% of college women answered "yes" to questions about whether they experienced something that met the definition of rape. An additional 12% of women answered "yes" to questions about whether they experienced something that met the definition of attempted rape, thus the statistic One in Four.

A point of contention lies in the leading nature of the questions in the study conducted by Koss, Gidycz & Wisniewski. Koss herself later admitted that the question that had garnered the largest "rape" result was flawed and ultimately rendered the study invalid. Most prominently the problem was that many respondents who had answered yes to several questions had their responses treated as having been raped. The issue being that these same respondents did not feel they had been victimized and never sought redress for grievances. The resultant change shows a prevalence of only 1 in 22 college women having been raped or attempted to be raped during their time at college.

In 1995, the CDC replicated part of this study, however they examined rape only, and did not look at attempted rape. They used a two-stage cluster sample design to produce a nationally representative sample of undergraduate college students aged greater than or equal to 18 years. The first-stage sampling frame contained 2,919 primary sampling units (PSUs), consisting of two- and four-year colleges and universities. The second sampling stage consisted of a random sample drawn from the primary sample unit frame enrolled in the 136 participating colleges and universities to increase the sample size to 4,609 undergraduate college students aged greater than or equal to 18 years old with a representative sample demographic matching the national demographic. Differential sampling rates of the PSU were used to ensure sufficient numbers of male and female, black and Hispanic students in the total sample population. After differential sample weighting, female students represented 55.5% of the sample; white students represented 72.8% of the sample, black students 10.3%, Hispanic students 7.1%, and 9.9% were other. It was determined that nationwide, 13.1% of college students reported that they had been forced to have sexual intercourse against their will during their lifetime. Female students were significantly more likely than male students to report they had ever been forced to have sexual intercourse; 20% of approximately 2500 females (55% of 4,609 samples) and 3.9% of males reported experiencing rape thus far in the course of their lifetime.

Other studies concerning the annual incidence of rape, some studies conclude an occurrence of 5%. The National Survey of Children's Exposure to Violence found that in the 2013–2014 academic year, 4.6% of girls ages 14–17 experienced sexual assault or sexual abuse. In another study, Mohler-Kuo, Dowdall, Koss & Weschler (2004) found in a study of approximately 25,000 college women nationwide that 4.7% experienced rape or attempted rape during a single academic year. This study did not measure lifetime incidence of rape or attempted rape. Similarly, Kilpatrick, Resnick, Ruggiero, Conoscenti, & McCauley (2007) found in a study of 2,000 college women nationwide that 5.2% experienced rape every year. On campuses, it has been found that alcohol is a prevalent issue in regards to sexual assault. It has been estimated that 1 in 5 women experience an assault, and of those women, 50–75% have had either the attacker, the woman, or both, consume alcohol prior to the assault. Not only has it been a factor in the rates of sexual assault on campus, but because of the prevalence, assaults are also being affected specifically by the inability to give consent when intoxicated and bystanders not knowing when to intervene due to their own intoxication or the intoxication of the victim.

Children

Other research has found that about 80,000 American children are sexually abused each year.

=== Estimates of prevalence ===
Total prevalence of sexual assault including unreported can be estimated with opinion polls. Below is shown the estimated percentage of population which stated to be a victim to sexual assault in the previous 12 months.

| Country | Female | Male | Total | Year |
|---|---|---|---|---|
| Angola | - | - | 4.8 | 2016 |
| Barbados | - | - | 1.0 | 2009 |
| Belgium | 1.1 | 0.1 | 1.2 | 2009 |
| Cameroon | 9.8 | - | - | 2011 |
| Canada | 2.1 | 0.5 | 1.3 | 2019 |
| Croatia | 3.9 | - | - | 2008 |
| El Salvador | 0.6 | 0.1 | 0.8 | 2018 |
| England and Wales | 4.2 | 1.2 | 2.7 | 2023 |
| Estonia | - | - | 2.0 | 2009 |
| Finland | 2.7 | 0.5 | 1.6 | 2022 |
| France | 0.9 | 0.2 | 0.5 | 2022 |
| Germany | 3.6 | 0.3 | 2.0 | 2020 |
| Guyana | - | - | 6.5 | 2010 |
| Hong Kong | 4.3 | 0.0 | 2.3 | 2006 |
| Iceland | 3.2 | 0.7 | 1.9 | 2023 |
| Iraq (Central) | 0.3 | 0.2 | 0.2 | 2021 |
| Israel | 4.2 | - | 2.4 | 2024 |
| Jamaica | - | - | 0.1 | 2016 |
| Kyrgyzstan | 1.2 | - | - | 2015 |
| Laos | 9.1 | - | - | 2016 |
| Luxembourg | 2.1 | 0.0 | 1.0 | 2013 |
| Mexico | 2.2 | 0.3 | 1.3 | 2023 |
| Netherlands | 3.1 | 0.6 | 1.9 | 2023 |
| New Zealand | 3.2 | 1.0 | 2.1 | 2021 |
| Oman | - | - | 2.3 | 2020 |
| Paraguay | 0.9 | 0.3 | 0.6 | 2010 |
| Peru | - | - | 1.7 | 2023 |
| Philippines | 1.6 | - | - | 2017 |
| Slovenia | 0.5 | 0.1 | 0.3 | 2020 |
| South Africa | - | - | 0.1 | 2014 |
| South Korea | - | - | 0.5 | 2022 |
| Sweden | 6.3 | 1.0 | 3.8 | 2023 |
| Switzerland | - | - | 1.0 | 2015 |
| Trinidad and Tobago | - | - | 0.6 | 2015 |
| United States of America | - | - | 0.2 | 2019 |

== By jurisdiction ==
=== Australia ===
Within Australia, the term sexual assault is used to describe a variation of sexual offences. This is due to a variety of definitions and use of terminology to describe sexual offences within territories and states as each territory and state have their own legislation to define rape, attempted rape, sexual assault, aggravated sexual assault, sexual penetration or intercourse without consent and sexual violence. In the State of New South Wales, sexual assault is a statutory offence punishable under s 61I of the Crimes Act 1900. The term "sexual assault" is equivalent to "rape" in ordinary parlance, while all other assaults of a sexual nature are termed "indecent assault". To be liable for punishment under the Crimes Act 1900, an offender must intend to commit an act of sexual intercourse as defined under s 61H(1) while having one of the states of knowledge of non-consent defined under s 61HA(3). But s 61HA(3) is an objective standard which only require the person has no reasonable grounds for believing the other person is consenting. The maximum penalty for sexual assault is 14 years imprisonment.

Aggravated sexual assault is sexual intercourse with another person without the consent of the other person and in circumstances of aggravation. The maximum penalty is imprisonment for 20 years under s 61J of the Crimes Act. In the state of Victoria, rape is punishable under s 38 of the Crimes Act 1958, with a maximum penalty of 25 years imprisonment. In the state of South Australia, rape is punishable under s 48 of the Criminal Law Consolidation Act 1935 (SA) with a maximum term of life imprisonment. In the state of Western Australia, sexual penetration is punishable under s 325 the Criminal Code Act 1913 with a maximum sentence of 14 years imprisonment. In the Northern Territory, offences of sexual intercourse and gross indecency without consent are punishable under s 192 of the Criminal Code Act 1983 and punishable with a maximum sentence of life imprisonment. In Queensland, rape and sexual assault are punishable under s 349, Chapter 32 of the Criminal Code Act 1899 with a maximum penalty of life imprisonment. In Tasmania, rape is punishable under s 185 of the Criminal Code Act 1924 with a maximum punishment of 21 years under s389 of the Criminal Code Act 1924. In the Australian Capital Territory, sexual assault is punishable under Part 3 of the Crimes Act 1900 with a maximum punishment of 17 years.

Sexual assault is considered a gendered crime which results in 85% of sexual assaults never coming to the attention of the criminal justice system according to the Australian Bureau of Statistics. This is due to low reporting rates, treatment of victims and distrust of the criminal justice system, difficulty in obtaining evidence and the belief in sexual assault myths; however, once a person is charged, the public prosecutor will decide whether the case will proceed to trial based on whether there is sufficient evidence and whether a case is in the public interest. Once the matter has reached trial, the matter will generally be heard in the District Court. This is because sexually violent crimes are mostly categorised as indictable offences (serious offences), as opposed to summary offences (minor offences). Sexual offences can also be heard in the Supreme Court, but more generally if the matter is being heard as an appeal. Once the matter is being heard, the prosecution must provide evidence which proves "beyond reasonable doubt" that the offence was committed by the defendant. The standard of proof is vital in checking the power of the state.

While each jurisdiction (State and Territory) has its own sexual offence legislation, there are many common elements to any criminal offence that advise on how the offence is defined and what must be proven by the prosecution in order to find the defendant guilty. These elements are known as actus reus, which comprises the physical element (Ryan v Regina, 1967), and the mens rea, which comprises the mental element (He Kaw Teh, 1985). Notable sexual assault cases which have resulted in convictions are Regina v Bilal Skaf (2005), as well as Regina v Mohommed Skaf (2005), which were highly visible in New South Wales within the media the 2000s. These cases were closely watched by the media and led to legislative changes such as the passing of the Crimes Amendment (Aggravated Sexual Assault in Company) Act 2001 No 62, which dramatically increased the sentences for 'gang rapists' by creating a new category of crime known as Aggravated Sexual Assault in Company. Changes were also made to the Crimes (Sentencing Procedure) Act 1999. This change is known as the Crimes (Sentencing Procedure) Amendment (Victim Impact Statements) Act 2004 No 3, which expands the category of offences in respect of which a Local Court may receive and consider Victim Impact Statements to include some indictable offences which are usually dealt with summarily.

=== Canada ===
Sexual assault is defined as sexual contact with another person without that other person's consent. Consent is defined in section 273.1(1) as "the voluntary agreement of the complainant to engage in the sexual activity in question". Section 265 of the Criminal Code defines the offences of assault and sexual assault. Section 271 criminalizes "Sexual assault", section 272 criminalizes "Sexual assault with a weapon, threats to a third party or causing bodily harm" and section 273 criminalizes "Aggravated sexual assault".

==== Consent ====
The absence of consent defines the crime of sexual assault. The Criminal Code provisions define consent in a general way, and then define situations where no consent is considered to have been obtained.

In 2011, the Supreme Court of Canada in R. v. J.A. held that a person must have an active mind during the sexual activity in order to consent, and that they cannot give consent in advance.

=== Germany ===
Before 1997, the definition of rape (German: Vergewaltigung) was: "Whoever compels a woman to have extramarital intercourse with him, or with a third person, by force or the threat of present danger to life or limb, shall be punished by not less than two years' imprisonment." In 1997, a broader definition was adopted with the 13th criminal amendment, section 177–179, which deals with sexual abuse. Rape is generally reported to the police, although it is also allowed to be reported to the prosecutor or District Court. As of 2025, the Criminal Code (Strafgesetzbuch) reads:

Section 177

Sexual assault by use of force or threats; rape

- (1) Whoever, against a person's discernible will, performs sexual acts on that person or has that person perform sexual acts on them, or causes that person to perform or acquiesce to sexual acts being performed on or by a third person incurs a penalty of imprisonment for a term of between six months and five years.
- ...
- (6) In especially serious cases the penalty shall be imprisonment of not less than two years. An especially serious case typically occurs if
  1. the offender performs sexual intercourse with the victim or performs similar sexual acts with the victim, or allows them to be performed on himself by the victim, especially if they degrade the victim or if they entail penetration of the body (rape); or
  2. the offence is committed jointly by more than one person.

Subsection (2) defines situations where the victim was unable to consent or coerced as having the same penalty. The other subsections provide additional stipulations on sentencing depending on aggravating or mitigating circumstances. Section 178 provides that "If, by committing sexual assault, sexual coercion or rape (section 177), the offender causes the victim's death at least recklessly, the penalty is imprisonment for life or imprisonment for a term of at least 10 years."

=== Republic of Ireland ===
As in many other jurisdictions, the term sexual assault is generally used to describe non-penetrative sexual offences. Section 2 of the Criminal Law (Rape) Act of 1981 states that a man has committed rape if he has sexual intercourse with a woman who at the time of the intercourse does not consent to it, and at that time he knows that she does not consent to the intercourse or he is reckless as to whether she does or does not consent to it. Under Section 4 of the Criminal Law (Rape Amendment) Act of 1990, rape means a sexual assault that includes penetration (however slight) of the anus or mouth by the penis or penetration (however slight) of the vagina by any object held or manipulated by another person. The maximum penalty for rape in Ireland is imprisonment for life.

=== South Africa ===
The Criminal Law (Sexual Offences and Related Matters) Amendment Act replaced the common-law offence of indecent assault with a statutory offence of sexual assault, defined in section 5 of the act as follows.

(1) A person ('"A") who unlawfully and intentionally sexually violates a complainant ("B"), without the consent of B, is guilty of the offence of sexual assault.

(2) A person ("A") who unlawfully and intentionally inspires the belief in a complainant ("B") that B will be sexually violated, is guilty of the offence of sexual assault.

The act's definition of "sexual violation" incorporates a number of sexual acts, including genital contact short of penetration as well as any contact with the mouth designed to cause sexual arousal. Non-consensual acts that involve actual penetration are included in the separate offence of rape rather than sexual assault. The Act also created the offences of "compelled sexual assault", when a person forces a second person to commit an act of sexual violation with a third person; and "compelled self-sexual assault", when a person forces another person to masturbate or commit various other sexual acts on theirself.

=== Spain ===
In August 2022, Spain passed a revolutionary "only yes means yes" sexual consent law which expanded the legal definition of sexual assault in Spain to being also sexual-related conduct without consent and now required that consent must be affirmative and cannot be assumed to have been given by default or silence. It also increased the nation's maximum rape sentence to 15 years, in tandem with 15-year sentences that were handed to perpetrators in the nation's 2016 wolf pack gang rape case; however, it received some criticism for the way it enacted sentencing reductions for some offenders. The law went into effect in October 2022. It was later amended in April 2023 to close loopholes which contributed to the sentence reduction controversy.

=== United Kingdom ===
==== England and Wales ====
Sexual assault is a statutory offence in England and Wales. It is created by section 3 of the Sexual Offences Act 2003 which defines "sexual assault" as when a person (A)

1. intentionally touches another person (B),
2. the touching is sexual,
3. B does not consent to the touching, and
4. A does not reasonably believe that B consents.

Whether a belief is reasonable is to be determined having regard to all the circumstances, including any steps A has taken to ascertain whether B consents. Sections 75 and 76 apply to an offence under this section. A person guilty of an offence under this section is liable—

1. on summary conviction, to imprisonment for a term not exceeding 6 months or a fine not exceeding the statutory maximum or both;
2. on conviction on indictment, to imprisonment for a term not exceeding 10 years.

Offences committed before the 2003 Act came into force are prosecuted under the Sexual Offences Act 1956 (or in theory earlier legislation), in particular indecent assault.

===== Consent =====
Section 74 of the Sexual Offenses Act explains that "a person consents if he agrees by choice and has the freedom and capacity to make that choice". Section 75 provides a rebuttable presumption that there was no consent in case of violence, intimidation, unlawful imprisonment, unconsciousness, or physical disability or drugs that impair the ability to give consent.

==== Northern Ireland ====
Sexual assault is a statutory offence. It is created by article 7 of the Sexual Offences (Northern Ireland) Order 2008. Sexual assault is defined as follows:

Sexual assault
(1) A person (A) commits an offence if—

(a) he intentionally touches another person (B),
(b) the touching is sexual,
(c) B does not consent to the touching, and
(d) A does not reasonably believe that B consents.

==== Scotland ====
Sexual assault is a statutory offence. It is created by section 3 of the Sexual Offences (Scotland) Act 2009. Sexual assault is defined as follows:

Sexual assault
(1) If a person ("A")—

(a) without another person ("B") consenting, and
(b) without any reasonable belief that B consents,

does any of the things mentioned in subsection (2), then A commits an offence, to be known as the offence of sexual assault.

(2) Those things are, that A—

(a) penetrates sexually, by any means and to any extent, either intending to do so or reckless as to whether there is penetration, the vagina, anus or mouth of B,
(b) intentionally or recklessly touches B sexually,
(c) engages in any other form of sexual activity in which A, intentionally or recklessly, has physical contact (whether bodily contact or contact by means of an implement and whether or not through clothing) with B,
(d) intentionally or recklessly ejaculates semen onto B,
(e) intentionally or recklessly emits urine or saliva onto B sexually.

=== United States ===
The United States Department of Justice defines sexual assault as "any type of sexual contact or behavior that occurs without the explicit consent of the recipient. Falling under the definition of sexual assault are sexual activities as forced sexual intercourse, forcible sodomy, child molestation, incest, fondling, and attempted rape." Every U.S. state has its own code of laws, and thus the definition of conduct that constitutes a crime, including a sexual assault, may vary to some degree by state. Some states may refer to sexual assault as "sexual battery" or "criminal sexual conduct".

==== Texas ====
The Texas Penal Code, Sec. 22.011(a), defines sexual assault as

A person commits [sexual assault] if the person:

(1) intentionally or knowingly:

(A) causes the penetration of the anus or sexual organ of another person by any means, without that person's consent;
(B) causes the penetration of the mouth of another person by the sexual organ of the actor, without that person's consent; or
(C) causes the sexual organ of another person, without that person's consent, to contact or penetrate the mouth, anus, or sexual organ of another person, including the actor; or

(2) intentionally or knowingly:

(A) causes the penetration of the anus or sexual organ of a child by any means;
(B) causes the penetration of the mouth of a child by the sexual organ of the actor;
(C) causes the sexual organ of a child to contact or penetrate the mouth, anus, or sexual organ of another person, including the actor;
(D) causes the anus of a child to contact the mouth, anus, or sexual organ of another person, including the actor; or
(E) causes the mouth of a child to contact the anus or sexual organ of another person, including the actor.

== See also ==
- Abuse
- Drug-facilitated sexual assault
- List of the causes of genital pain
- #MeToo
- National Society for the Prevention of Cruelty to Children
- Patient abuse
- Post-assault treatment of sexual assault victims
- R v Collins
- Raelyn Campbell
- Rape kit
- Rape paralysis
- Sexual assault in the U.S. military
- Sexual assault of migrants from Latin America to the United States
- Sexual violence
- Statutory rape
