= Okinawa-Kyokuryū-kai =

Yakuza group in Okinawa Prefecture, Japan

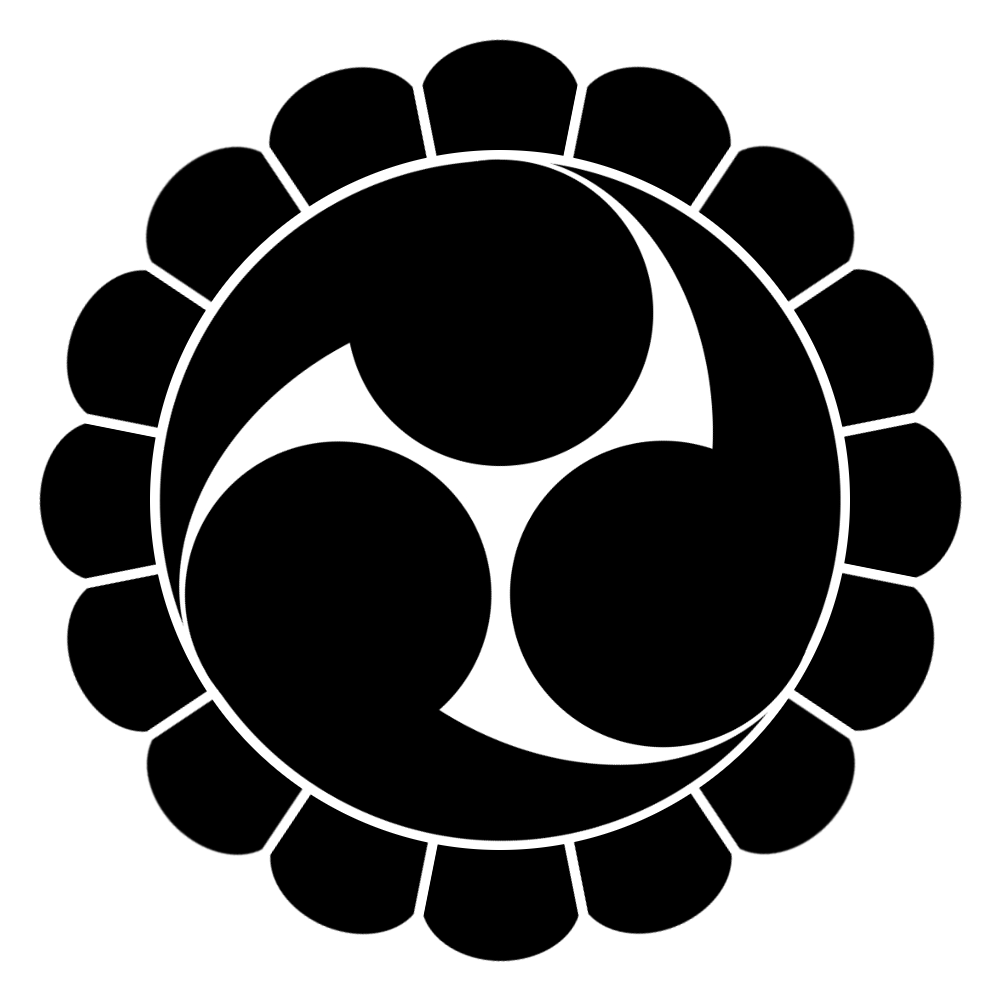
Daimon of Okinawa Kyokuryu-kai

The Okinawa Kyokuryu-kai (沖縄旭琉会, Okinawa Kyokuryū-kai) is a yakuza criminal organization based on the Okinawa island of Japan. A designated yakuza group with an estimated 300 active members, the Okinawa Kyokuryu-kai is the largest yakuza organization in Okinawa Prefecture.

== History ==
The Okinawa Kyokuryu-kai was formed in 1990 when it split from Okinawa's main yakuza group, the Kyokuryu-kai. The formation was led by Kiyoshi Tominaga, who became the first president. The Okinawa Kyokuryu-kai, along with the Kyokuryu-kai, was registered as a designated yakuza group under the Organized Crime Countermeasures Law in June 1992.

== Condition ==
Headquartered in Naha, Okinawa, the Okinawa Kyokuryu-kai is one of the two designated yakuza groups in Okinawa Prefecture along with its former parent organization, the Kyokuryu-kai. The Okinawa Kyokuryu-kai is the largest yakuza organization in Okinawa Prefecture, followed by the second-largest Kyokuryu-kai and the third-largest Yoshimi-kogyo.

== Activities ==
The Okinawa Kyokuryu-kai's official policy forbids its members from engaging in drug trafficking.
