= Kyokuryū-kai =

Japanese organized criminal group

Daimon of Kyokuryu-kai

The Kyokuryu-kai (旭琉会, Kyokuryū-kai) is a yakuza criminal organization based on the Okinawa island of Japan, with an estimated membership of 210–270.

Headquartered in Naha, Okinawa, the Kyokuryu-kai is one of the two designated yakuza groups in Okinawa Prefecture along with its splinter group Okinawa Kyokuryu-kai, and had been Okinawa's largest organized crime group since 1983 until 1990 when the Okinawa Kyokuryu-kai broke away.

== History ==
The Kyokuryu-kai was formed in 1970 as the Okinawa-rengo Kyokuryu-kai (沖縄連合旭琉会, Okinawa-rengō Kyokuryū-kai; lit. "Okinawa-Union Kyokuryu-Group") by two gangs, the Naha Clan and the Koza Clan. These two gangs were practically not "yakuza" groups descended from the yakuza tradition (Okinawa was originally not part of Japan's territory) but were just a bunch of primitive bandits whose activities consisted of mugging United States military servicemen and smuggling valuables from nearby wealthier places such as Taiwan and Hong Kong , and they had originally opposed each other until that merger. They formed the union in the year of 1970, shortly before the return of Okinawa to Japan, with the alleged purpose of preventing yakuza's invasion from the mainland.

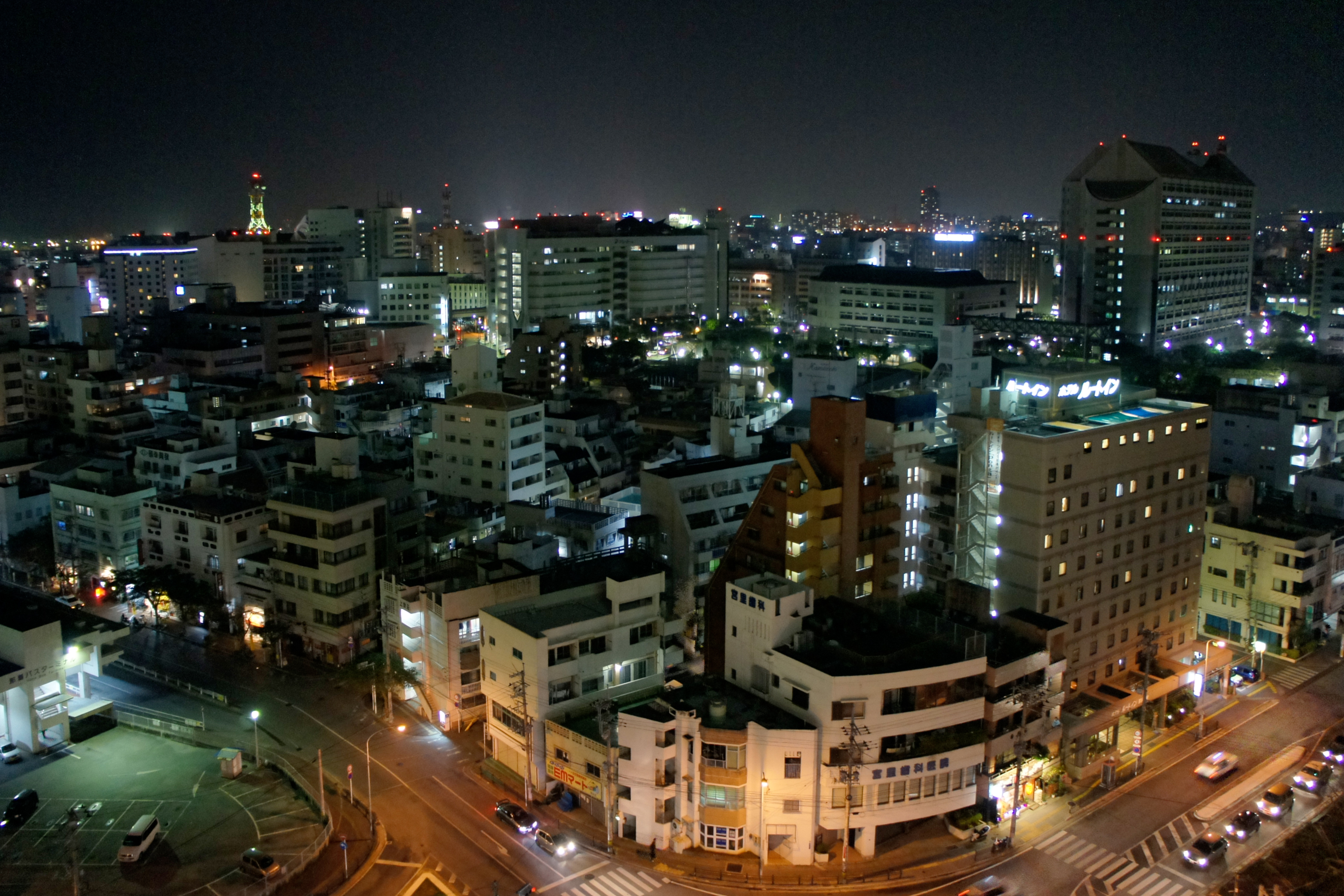
Naha

From 1973 to 1981, the Kyokuryu-kai was in fierce conflict with the Yamaguchi-gumi, the largest known yakuza syndicate attempting to expand its influence into Okinawa at that time. Later dubbed the "4th Okinawa War" (第4次沖縄抗争) and described as a "war of slaughter", this conflict often involved carbines, magnum bullets and hand grenades among other weapons, and was considered one of the most brutal yakuza conflicts in the 20th century. Unlike the Dojin-kai, which had also been in conflict with the Yamaguchi-gumi in the late 20th century, the Kyokuryu-kai had never committed unconventional gruesome acts such as mass destruction and mass murder, but the victims included an innocent katagi, or ordinary civilian; a policeman who was shot with a carbine by a Kyokuryu member.

The first president resigned in 1976, and the second president was shot to death in 1982 by an affiliate organization. Yoshihiro Onaga became the third president in 1983, and membership reached 1,000. In 1990 an internal war broke out, and Kiyoshi Tominaga founded a splinter organization, the Okinawa Kyokuryu-kai. In June 1992 the Kyokuryu-kai, along with the Okinawa Kyokuryu-kai, was registered as a designated yakuza group under the Organized Crime Countermeasures Law.

The Kyokuryu-kai seems to have adopted the yakuza tradition extensively; the National Police Agency's 1993 Police White Paper introduced a total of two notable cases of yubitsume, or finger cutting, and in these two cases, one was of a Kyokuryu-kai member, the other was of an Okinawa Kyokuryu-kai member.

== Condition ==
The Kyokuryu-kai had been in conflict with the Okinawa Kyokuryu-kai for years, but it has been reported that they have been pondering a reconciliation since 1998.

== Activities ==
The Kyokuryu-kai's official policy forbids its members from engaging in drug trafficking.
