= Raelynn Hillhouse =

American novelist

Raelynn J. Hillhouse is an American national security and Intelligence community analyst, former smuggler during the Cold War, spy novelist and health care executive.

== Personal history ==
Hillhouse taught at the University of Michigan and was an assistant professor of political science at the University of Hawaiʻi at Mānoa. She is a founding member of the International Thriller Writers.

Hillhouse is also a health care executive who has developed behavioral health programs for children with autism. She was CEO and President of Hawaii Behavioral Health. She also founded Thrive Autism Solutions, one of the largest providers of autism behavioral health services in the Midwest.

Hillhouse studied in Central and Eastern Europe for over six years at various institutions including Moscow State University, Moscow Finance Institute, Humboldt University of Berlin, Eberhard Karls University of Tübingen (both in Germany), and Babes-Bolyai University (Cluj, Romania). She earned her undergraduate degree from Washington University in St. Louis and her MA in Russian and East European Studies as well as her Ph.D. in political science from the University of Michigan.

When living as a student in Europe, she claims to have engaged in the black market between East and West, running Cuban rum, smuggling jewels from the Soviet Union and laundering East Bloc currencies. She claims to have been recruited by the East German secret police, the Stasi, and by the Libyan Intelligence Service. Some sources assert that she was an American intelligence officer, but Hillhouse denies this.

Hillhouse was born in the Ozarks and currently lives in Hawaii.

== Blog ==
Hillhouse writes a national security blog which has broken multiple national security stories. Her work has been extensively cited in global media, books and academic journals and law reviews.

In 2007, the New York Times Week in Review republished excerpts from an exclusive interview from Hillhouse's blog with the head of the private military corporation Blackwater USA.

In June 2007, Hillhouse discovered the US national Intelligence Community budget metadata in a declassified PowerPoint presentation released by the Office of the Director of National Intelligence. She broke international news stories on national security risks caused by the explosion in outsourcing governmental intelligence functions. Her controversial articles have twice elicited a response from the Office of the Director of National Intelligence—the only times the office of the nation's chief spy has ever publicly responded to the writings of a private citizen.

== Death of Bin Laden Report ==
On August 7, 2011, Hillhouse published an account of Osama bin Laden's death on her blog that suggested Pakistan's Inter-Services Intelligence (ISI) had been sheltering bin Laden in return for Saudi cash and that he was betrayed by a Pakistani intelligence officer.

Hillhouse's sources claimed that the narrative given by the White House of the courier revealing the location of bin Laden was a cover story, created to hide involvement of US allies in sheltering bin Laden. According to The Telegraph, Hillhouse's account might explain why U.S. forces encountered no resistance on their way to and in Abbottabad, and why some residents in Abbottabad were warned to stay in their houses the day before the raid. Her 2011 story received widespread international attention and was picked up by The Daily Telegraph, The Daily Mail, The National Post, The Vancouver Sun, The Sydney Morning Herald, The New Zealand Herald, and others, but had little coverage in the US.

== Controversy over report of bin Laden's death ==
In May 2015, Pulitzer Prize-winning investigative journalist Seymour Hersh published a report in the London Review of Books in which he claimed to break the story of bin Laden's death. His claims mirrored the ones which Hillhouse raised four years earlier.

The New York Times, The Washington Post and other global media acknowledged that Hillhouse wrote about the events years before Hersh, although Hersh denied ever having seen her account.

NBC News independently reported that a Pakistani intelligence officer was the source of the original bin Laden location report, and not the courier. NBC News and Agence France-Presse both reported that their sources indicated that a walk-in was a highly valuable asset in the discovery of bin Laden. Pakistan-based journalist Amir Mir in the News International reported the walk-in's identity to be Usman Khalid, though that allegation was denied by Khalid's family.

== Publications ==
=== Articles ===
She has also published stories on national security in the Washington Post and The Nation. In the controversial Washington Post article, Hillhouse wrote that "the private spy industry has succeeded where no foreign government has: It has penetrated the CIA and is running the show." In the Nation article, Hillhouse revealed that private companies are heavily involved in the nation’s most important and most sensitive national security document — the President’s Daily Brief. Hillhouse was also a regular contributor to Wired's national security blog, "The Danger Room".

- "Don't Blame Blackwater", The Christian Science Monitor, November 2, 2007.
- "The Government Can Find You." The New York Times, August 7, 2007.
- “Outsourcing Intelligence”, The Nation, July 31, 2007.
- "Who Runs the CIA?" Washington Post, July 8, 2007.
- “A Security Contractor Defends His Team, Which, He Says, Is Not a Private Army”, The New York Times, April 29, 2007.
- "Communist Politics and Sexual Dissidents. Social Movements in Eastern Europe." Sexual Minorities and Society: The Changing Attitudes toward Sexuality in 20th Century Europe. Tallinn: Estonian Academy of Sciences, 1991.
- "Out of the Closet behind the Wall: Sexual Politics and Social Change in the GDR." Slavic Review, 49:4 (Winter 1990), pages 585-96.

=== Books ===
Hillhouse's debut novel, Rift Zone (2004), is a spy thriller about a female smuggler who becomes entangled in an East German plot to stop the fall of the Berlin Wall. The American Booksellers Association Book Sense program selected it as one of the best books of 2004 and Library Journal named it one of the year's most promising debuts. Her second novel, Outsourced (2007) is a political thriller about the outsourcing of the CIA and Pentagon and the turf wars between the two agencies. Publishers Weekly named the audio version one of the best books of the year.

- Outsourced. New York: Forge Books, 2007.
  - (Audio). Blackstone Audiobooks, 2007.
  - (Italian). Mondadori, 2008.
  - (Dutch). Uitgeverij Luitingh, 2008.
- "Diplomatic Constraints." Thriller. Ed. by James Patterson. New York: Mira Books, 2006.
- "I knew Julius No. Julius No was a friend of mine. Osama, you are no Dr. No.—An open letter to bin Laden from James Bond’s Greatest Villains." James Bond in the 21st Century: Why We Still Need 007. Dallas: BenBella Books, 2006.
- "Secret Agent Chick." This is Chick-Lit. Ed. by Lauren Baratz-Logsted. Dallas: BenBella Books, 2006.
- Rift Zone. Forge Books: New York, 2004.
  - (Mass market paperback) Forge Books: New York, 2005.
  - (Russian translation, Шпионка по случаю), St. Petersburg: Alpharet, 2006.
- "East Germany--Lothar DeMaizière," Leaders of Nations. Lansdale [Pennsylvania]: Current Leaders Publishing Co., 1990.
- "A Reevaluation of Soviet Policy in Central Europe: The Soviet Union and the Occupation of Austria." Eastern European Politics and Societies, 3:1 (1989), pages 83–104.
