= Sex trafficking in Japan =

Sex trafficking in Japan is human trafficking for the purpose of sexual exploitation and slavery that occurs in the country. Japan is a country of origin, destination, and transit for sexually trafficked persons.

Japanese citizens, primarily women and girls, have been sex trafficked within Japan and to a lesser degree abroad. Foreign victims are sex trafficked into the country. Minors and persons from families in poverty are particularly vulnerable to sex trafficking. Sex trafficked victims are deceived, threatened, and forced into prostitution. Their passports and bank documents are often confiscated. Debt bondage is often employed. They suffer from physical and psychological trauma. A number contract sexually transmitted diseases from rape and live in generally poor conditions. Some rescued victims face ostracization, depression, and or commit suicide. Online sextortion and the creation of coerced rape pornography are issues.

Male and female traffickers in Japan come from a wide range of backgrounds and every social class. Traffickers are often members of or facilitated by crime syndicates, including the yakuza or bōryokudan. Sex trafficking is linked to Japan's entertainment and tourism industries, and women and girls are also trafficked to businesses catering to military servicemen and contractors in United States Forces Japan. Traffickers have used internet websites, email, and apps to lure victims. Perpetrators have also been family members. Japanese nationals have engaged in cybersex trafficking.

The scale of sex trafficking in Japan is difficult to know because of the underground nature of sex trafficking crimes, the fact that only a small minority of cases are reported to the authorities, and other factors. The Japanese government has been criticized for its lack of anti-sex trafficking efforts and laws. Some Japanese officials have been accused of being apathetic about the issue. Many sex traffickers of children reportedly operate with impunity in Japan. There is inadequate screening for trafficking indicators following the identification of children in the Japanese commercial sex industry by law enforcement. In 2014, the US Department of State reported that "Japan is the international hub for the production and trafficking of child pornography".

== History ==
Sex trafficking in Japan has occurred from ancient times to the present and has been linked to slavery in Japan. Following the Portuguese contact, Japanese slave girls were transferred to Europe for sexual exploitation. In early 20th century, Japanese women, who were referred to as Karayuki-san, were trafficked and forced to sexual slavery in America, Siberia, Chosen (Korea), Hong Kong, Singapore, etc. During the Asia–Pacific War, comfort women from Japan and other nations were sex trafficked throughout the Japanese mainland and Japanese-occupied territories.

== Types ==
=== Debts ===
Victims have been sex trafficked or coerced into prostitution because of debts and unlawful loans. People unable to pay bills at host and hostess clubs have been forced to repay debts by offering sex services in Japan or are sent overseas.

=== Exploitation of children ===
Girls, including runaways, are lured, coerced, or forced into prostitution in Japan. The creation and sale of child pornography in Japan is a pervasive problem.

Some Japanese students engage in or get drawn into enjo kōsai ("compensated dating") in Tokyo and other cities. Some JK businesses are thought to serve as a gateway to sexual exploitation in Japan. Some JK businesses offers "hidden options," and attract high school girls looking to earn extra money. Evidence suggests these dating activities are preparatory stages for potential forms of child prostitution and child abuse. Critics have charged that police do not do enough to protect the women who get drawn into this. According to the 2018 Trafficking in Persons Report, there were 137 JK business operations identified and not closed; 69 individuals arrested for being engaged in criminal activities surrounding the JK business.

=== Child Sexual Abuse Material (CSAM) ===
In April 2025, the National Police Agency in Japan confirmed the arrest of 111 perpetrators nationwide in a joint project conducted in February and March 2025 with five other countries. In total, 544 individuals across the participating countries have been arrested or uncovered for distributing child sexual abuse material (CSAM) online.

Perpetrators of Child Sexual Abuse Material (CSAM) often have easy access to children, evident by the number of school teachers that are arrested for violating the child pornography law. Perpetrators may obtain these images by capturing actual exploitation of a child on camera, or through voyeurism (secret filming of children), and often share these images with other perpetrators through social media or other sharing platforms, including the dark web.

=== False promises of work opportunities ===
Besides young Japanese women and girls, foreign women who work in or migrate to Japan are also vulnerable to sexual exploitation, especially those from Cambodia, Thailand, and the Philippines. These victims are often lured by false promises of work opportunities in Japan arrive on short-stay visas. Once they arrive in Japan, they are subsequently forced into sex work, however, their involvement in the adult entertainment industry is generally regarded as voluntary participants, whatever their circumstances. Because of the visa status, these foreign workers are reluctant to seek help from local authorities since they acknowledge the visa was not able to grant them legal working rights in Japan. Combined with factors such as psychological intimidation, language barriers, and cultural differences, foreign women are in a highly vulnerable position.

==== Modeling scams ====
Japanese citizens, in addition to foreign women, are deceived by malicious individuals who claim to be fashion model agents. The victims are then convinced to sign phony contracts, legally binding them to participate in prostitution and the production of pornography. If victims try to refuse, agents allegedly threaten that they will have to pay penalties, or they will reveal the videos to the victim's family. Victims are also forced to sign contracts through which they abandon certain legal rights, such as copyrights of the films in which they are portrayed.

== Anti-sex trafficking efforts ==
=== Corporations ===
All Nippon Airways (ANA) provides flight attendants with trafficking recognition and reporting training.

=== Non-governmental organizations ===
Lighthouse: Center for Human Trafficking Victims, was one of the first non-profit organizations that worked to rescue and aid sex trafficking victims in Japan, helping them to arrange legal counsel, shelter, and medical care. The organization has since closed their operation. The organization had created and distributed materials to raise awareness about human trafficking, including a manga titled Blue Heart.

Colabo (Tokyo) conducts anti-sex trafficking efforts in the country.

ZOE Japan combats child trafficking and offers free educational resources in English and Japanese, as well as a hotline for children that are victims of exploitation.

The Japan Network Against Trafficking In Persons (JNATIP) is a network of NGOs, lawyers and activists that work together to address policy issues related to human trafficking (including sex trafficking and labor trafficking) and other human rights violations of national and foreign victims. Once a year they have a 2-day meeting with different government representatives to discuss policy concerns and make recommendations as input for the government's human trafficking action plan.

PAPS provides support to victims of digital sexual violence, especially in the adult video industry.

The Solidarity Network with Migrants in Japan provides support to victims of labor trafficking, especially foreign migrant workers.

=== Government response ===
Japanese authorities have taken law enforcement actions against adult and child sex trafficking. The Employment Security Act (ESA) and the Labor Standards Act (LSA) both criminalized forced labor, which protects mental and physical freedom of the workers and serves as a measure against sex trafficking. The "Act on Regulation and Punishment of Activities Relating to Child Prostitution and Pornography and the Protection of Children" criminalized engaging in commercial sexual exploitation of a child, including purchase or sale of children for the purpose of production of child pornography or prostitution. On March 29, 2016, a cabinet decision was made on "Regarding basic policies on activities relating to measures against sexual exploitation etc. of children". This decision was meant to eradicate the sexual victimization of children resulting from child prostitution and the production of child pornography. The National Public Safety Commission has been designated to govern the overall measures against the sexual exploitation of children. The police also work closely together with the relevant ministries and authorities to crack down on child prostitution-related crimes. Seven major prefectures maintained ordinances banning JK businesses, prohibiting girls younger than 18 from working in compensated dating services, or requiring JK business owners to register their employee rosters with local public safety commissions.

The Ministry of Justice's Human Rights Division provides temporary protections to victims and monitors industries and job brokers that recruit foreign nationals.

=== How to report potential human trafficking ===
The government provides a One Stop Support Center for victims of sexual crimes and sexual violence. When in trouble, a victim can simply call #8891 from their phone and their call will be redirected to the nearest center. The full list of centers is available here.

The Internet Hotline Center (IHC) receives reports on behalf of the National Police Agency of all online illegal content, including human trafficking, child sexual abuse images or ads that meet the definition of illegal prostitution. URLs can be reported anonymously through their website.

PAPS receives reports and offers consultations via phone or through their website in multiple languages.

ZOE Japan offers consultation for children under 18 through their website, phone or via the LINE messaging app.

== See also ==
- Rape in Japan
- Prostitution in Japan
