= Raelyn Campbell =

Raelyn Campbell is Senior Program Officer for the Asia-Pacific Region at the Bill and Melinda Gates Foundation, directing the Foundation's engagement with the region, including innovative financing partnerships to support global immunization campaigns and global health R&D.

In her personal life, she has been involved in two high-profile lawsuits - one a criminal case in Japan, after being the victim of sexual assault, and the other a civil case in the United States, involving a computer of hers that had disappeared.

In 1998, Campbell was the victim of a sexual attack in Japan. Her pursuit of justice as a result of this attack received significant coverage in English and Japanese-language press in Japan and North America.

In 2007, she filed a $54 million civil lawsuit against Best Buy for having lost her computer, which, she said, contained important identity information. This legal action also received extensive media coverage, including an appearance she made on The Today Show, in 2008.

Campbell's writings have appeared in The Japan Times and the Japan Policy Research Institute Critique.

== Pursuit of victims' rights law in Japan after victimized in sexual assault ==
According to news reports, Campbell was attacked in Tokyo in a sexual assault in 1998. She freed herself from her attacker, who then fled. She pursued him and managed to bring him to her landlord's office. Police were called and she filed a report. The police dragged their feet for months, until later, when in an appearance at the Foreign Correspondents' Club of Japan, Campbell held a news conference, during which she called for a victim's rights law in Japan. The story was then reported by news organizations such as The Associated Press, and appeared in publications such as the Los Angeles Times and the Toronto Star.

Ultimately, her attacker was convicted of sexual assault.

== Lawsuit against Best Buy ==
In 2007 Campbell filed a $54 million lawsuit against Best Buy after the company told her that the computer she had brought in to be repaired (which she said contained important identity information, such as tax records) was lost. She said she had spent months trying to find out the status of the computer and was given conflicting reports by numerous Best Buy employees.

Many writers following her lawsuit dismissed her case as frivolous, but some in blog posts (such as one in The Washington Post) expressed sympathy for Campbell and supported her attempts to draw attention to consumer rights. Campbell indicated that she chose the figure because a Washington, D.C. judge, Roy Pearson, had sued a dry cleaners for the same amount after the business had lost a pair of his pants. She said she never expected to receive the amount she sued for, but wanted to bring attention to the case.

According to an April 30, 2008 post on the website pointoflaw.com, Campbell's case was dismissed.

== Writings ==
Campbell's writings include her observations on her experiences in Japan as well as on world affairs, including her efforts in attempting to eradicate polio. She has also written a blog on her lawsuit against Best Buy.
