= List of yakuza syndicates =

Yakuza

Yakuza (Japanese: ヤクザ; [jaꜜkɯza]), also known as gokudō (極道; "the extreme path"), are members of transnational organized crime syndicates originating in Japan.

== Syndicates ==
=== Four largest syndicates ===
Although yakuza membership has declined following an anti-gang law aimed specifically at yakuza and passed by the Japanese government in 1992, there are thought to be about 17,600 active yakuza members in Japan today.

Principal families	Description	Mon (crest)
Yamaguchi-gumi (六代目山口組, Rokudaime Yamaguchi-gumi)	The Yamaguchi-gumi is the largest yakuza family, with about 3,100 members.	"Yamabishi" (山菱)
Sumiyoshi-kai (住吉会)	The Sumiyoshi-kai is the second-largest yakuza family, with 2,100 members. Sumiyoshi-kai is a confederation of smaller yakuza groups. Its current head (会長 oyabun) is Isao Seki.	
Inagawa-kai (稲川会)	The Inagawa-kai is the third-largest yakuza family in Japan, with roughly 1,600 members. It is based in the Tokyo–Yokohama area and was one of the first yakuza families to expand its operations outside of Japan.	
Dojin-kai (道仁会)	The Dojin-kai is the fourth-largest yakuza family, with 310 members. It is based in Fukuoka and is considered to be the leading methamphetamine trafficker in Japan.	

=== Designated bōryokudan ===
A designated boryokudan (指定暴力団, Shitei Bōryokudan) is a "particularly harmful" yakuza group registered by the Prefectural Public Safety Commissions under the Organized Crime Countermeasures Law (暴力団対策法, Bōryokudan Taisaku Hō) enacted in 1991.

The numbers that follow the names of bōryokudan groups refer to the group's leadership. For example, Yoshinori Watanabe headed the Yamaguchi-gumi fifth; on his retirement, Shinobu Tsukasa became head of the Yamaguchi-gumi sixth, and "Yamaguchi-gumi VI" is the group's formal name.

Name	Japanese name	Headquarters	Reg. in	Notes
Yamaguchi-gumi VI	六代目山口組	Kobe, Hyōgo	1992	It was founded in 1915 and split from the Oshima-gumi in 1932. Yamaguchi is the surname of the founder and first boss and kumi or gumi means group.
Inagawa-kai	稲川会	Minato, Tokyo	1992	Inagawa is the surname of the founder and first boss and kai means organization or society. It is a member of the Kantō-Shinboku-kai (Kanto social gathering).
Sumiyoshi-kai	住吉会	Minato, Tokyo	1992	Sumiyoshi means the name of place. It is a member of the Kantō-Shinboku-kai.
Kudō-kai V	五代目工藤會	Kitakyushu, Fukuoka	1992	It was renamed from Kudō-rengō-Kusano-ikka in 1999. Kudō is the surname of the founder and first boss. It is a member of the Yonsha-kai (Four social gathering).
Kyokuryū-kai	旭琉會	Okinawa, Okinawa	1992	It was renamed from Okinawa-Kyokuryū-kai in 2011.
Aizu-Kotetsu-kai VII	七代目会津小鉄会	Kyoto, Kyoto	1992	This was established in the Edo period. It was renamed from Aizu-Kotetsu in 1998. Aizu Kotetsu means the nickname of the first boss Senkichi Kosaka and Aizu means the name of place.
Kyōsei-kai VI	六代目共政会	Hiroshima, Hiroshima	1992	It is a member of the Gosha-kai (Five social gathering).
Gōda-ikka VII	七代目合田一家	Shimonoseki, Yamaguchi	1992	Gōda is the surname of the founder and first boss and ikka means family. It is a member of the Gosha-kai.
Kozakura-ikka IV	四代目小桜一家	Kagoshima, Kagoshima	1992	
Asano-gumi V	五代目浅野組	Kasaoka, Okayama	1992	Asano is the surname of the boss. It is a member of the Gosha-kai.
Dōjin-kai	道仁会	Kurume, Fukuoka	1992	It is a member of the Yonsha-kai.
Shinwa-kai II	二代目親和会	Takamatsu, Kagawa	1992	It is a member of the Gosha-kai.
Sōai-kai	双愛会	Ichihara, Chiba	1992	It is a member of the Kantō-Shinboku-kai.
Kyōdō-kai III	三代目俠道会	Onomichi, Hiroshima	1993	It is a member of the Gosha-kai.
Taishū-kai	太州会	Tagawa, Fukuoka	1993	Taishū means the nickname of the first boss. It is a member of the Yonsha-kai.
Sakaume-gumi X	十代目酒梅組	Osaka, Osaka	1993	
Kyokutō-kai	極東会	Toshima, Tokyo	1993	Kyokutō means Far East. It is a member of the Kantō-Shinnō-Doushi-kai (Kanto Shennong Association). It is a tekiya group.
Azuma-gumi II	二代目東組	Osaka, Osaka	1993	Azuma is the surname of the boss.
Matsuba-kai	松葉会	Taito, Tokyo	1994	Matsuba means pine needle, is kamon of the boss of predecessor syndicate Sekine-gumi. It is a member of the Kantō-Shinboku-kai.
Fukuhaku-kai IV	四代目福博会	Fukuoka, Fukuoka	2000	Fukuhaku means the name of place, Hakata Fukuoka.
Namikawa-kai	浪川会	Omuta, Fukuoka	2008	It was formed from split from Dojin-kai in 2006 and remained active until on June 11, 2013, when the senior members of the Kyushu Seido-kai said that the gang was disbanding to rejoin the Dojin-kai after resolving the problems the dispute had caused. On October 7, 2013 was formed the Namikawa-mutsumi-kai by upper members of the former Kyushu-Seido-kai when they visited a shrine in Kumamoto Prefecture when one member read aloud an oath announcing the formation of the new yakuza group, based in Omuta City, Fukuoka. Namikawa is the surname of the boss. It was renamed to Namikawa-kai in 2015.
Kōbe-Yamaguchi-gumi	神戸山口組	Kobe, Hyōgo	2016	It was split of Yamaguchi-gumi VI in 2015.
Kizuna-kai	絆會	Amagasaki, Hyōgo	2018	It was split of Kōbe-Yamaguchi-gumi as Ninkyo-dantai-Yamaguchi-gumi in 2017. It was renamed to Ninkyo-Yamaguchi-gumi in 2017. It was renamed to Kizuna-kai in 2020.
Kantō-Sekine-gumi	関東関根組	Tsuchiura, Ibaraki	2018	It was split of Matsuba-kai as Matsubakai-Sekine-gumi in 2014. It renamed to Kanto-Sekine-gumi in 2017.

=== Designated bōryokudan in the past ===
Name	Japanese name	Headquarters	Designated in	Notes
Ishikawa-ikka	石川一家	Saga	1993–1995	Ishikawa is the surname of the boss. It was joined to the Yamaguchi-gumi V in 1995.
Dainippon-Heiwa-kai II	二代目大日本平和会	Hyōgo	1994–1997	It was successor of Honda-kai. Dainippon means Great Japan and heiwa means peace. It was not designated update.
Kumamoto-rengō Yamano-kai III	熊本連合 三代目山野会	Kumamoto	1998–2001	Kumamoto means the name of place and rengo means coalition. Yamano is the surname of the boss. It was destroyed.
Kyokutō-Sakurai-sōke-rengō-kai	極東桜井總家連合会	Shizuoka	1993–2005	Sakurai is the surname of the boss, sōke means all family or head family and rengō-kai means federation. It disappeared.
Kokusui-kai	國粹会	Tokyo	1994–2005	Kokusui means Japanese nationalism. It was joined to the Yamaguchi-gumi VI.
Nakano-kai	中野会	Osaka	1999–2005	It was split from Yamaguchi-gumi in 1997. Nakano is the surname of the boss. It was disbanded in 2005.
Kyokuryū-kai IV	四代目旭琉会	Okinawa	1992–2012	It has been merged into Okinawa-Kyokuryū-kai in 2011.

=== Other notable bōryokudan ===
Name	Japanese name	Headquarters	Boss	Notes
Genseida-Kōyū-kai	源清田交友会	Ibaraki	Shiroo Tanabe (田名辺 城男)	Its core is the Genseida-Fukuyama-kai VI (源清田福山会六代目) and Genseida-Tanabe III (源清田田名辺三代目). It had once belonged to the Zen-Nihon-Genseida-rengo-kai (全日本源清田連合会). It is friendly with the Matsuba-kai.
Yorii-sōke VIII	八代目寄居宗家	Gunma	Mitsuo Kawada? (川田 光雄)	It withdrew from Kōdō-kai. Yorii is a place name and soke means head family.
Yorii-bunke VI	寄居分家六代目	Gunma	Takashi Iwano? (岩野 賞)	Bunke means branch family. Member of the Kantō-Shinnō-Doushi-kai.
Kameya-ikka VI	六代目亀屋一家	Saitama	Makoto Yamazaki? (山崎 誠)	It was split from Takezawa-kai. It is friendly with the Sumiyoshi-kai.
Yoshiha-kai VIII	八代目吉羽会	Saitama	Toshihito Takanomori? (高野守 利人)	It was split from Takezawa-kai. Member of the Kanto-Shinno-Doushi-kai.
Takezawa-kai	竹澤会	Chiba	Haruo Ōtawa (太田和 春雄)	Formerly known as Zen-Takezawa-rengō-kai. Takezawa is the surname of the boss. Member of the Kanto-Shinno-Doushi-kai. It is friendly with the Sumiyoshi-kai.
Anegasaki-kai	姉ヶ崎会	Tokyo	Shigetami Nakanome (中野目 重民)	Formerly known as Anegasaki-rengō-kai in 2006. Anegasaki is a place name. Member of the Kanto-Shinno-Doushi-kai.
Iijima-kai VIII	九代目飯島会	Tokyo	Minoru Matsuhashi (松橋 稔)	Formerly known as Zen-Nihon-Iijima-rengō-kai. Iijima is the surname of the boss. Member of the Kanto-Shinno-Doushi-kai.
Okaniwa-kai	岡庭会	Tokyo	Seiichirō Okaniwa (岡庭 清一郎)	Okaniwa is the surname of the boss. Member of the Kanto-Shinno-Doushi-kai.
Kawaguchiya-kai	川口家会	Tokyo	Kiyoshi Osaka (大坂 清)	
Kanda-Takagi VII	神田高木七代目	Tokyo	Akira Nagamura (長村 昭)	Kanda is a place name and Takagi is the surname of the boss.
Shitaya-Hanajima-kai?	下谷花島会	Tokyo	Ōsaka Isamu? (大坂 勇)	Shitaya is a place name. Member of the Kanto-Shinno-Doushi-kai.
Jōshūya-kai	上州家会	Tokyo	Katsuhiko Itō (伊藤 勝彦)	Member of the Kanto-Shinno-Doushi-kai. It is friendly with the Sumiyoshi-kai.
Shinmon-rengō-kai	新門連合会	Tokyo	Naoaki Kasama (笠間 直明)	It has inherited the genealogy of Shinmon Tatsugoro.
Sugitō-kai	杉東会	Tokyo	Tomoaki Nohara (野原 朝明)	Sugitō means east of Suginami. Formerly known as Sugitō-rengō-kai. Member of the Kanto-Shinno-Doushi-kai.
Daigo-kai	醍醐会	Tokyo	Hideo Aoyama (青山 秀夫)	Member of the Kanto-Shinno-Doushi-kai.
Chōjiya-kai	丁字家会	Tokyo	Takuya Nakasugi (中杉 拓哉)	Formerly known as Zen-Chōjiya-rengō-kai. Chōjiya means clove merchants. Member of the Kanto-Shinno-Doushi-kai.
Tōsei-kai	東声会	Tokyo	Yasushi Hayano (早野 泰)	Successor to Tōsei-kai. Tōa means East Asia. Member of the Kanto-Shinboku-kai. It was renamed to Tosei-kai.
Hashiya-kai	箸家会	Tokyo	Kōtarō Satō (佐藤 幸太郎)	Member of the Kanto-Shinno-Doushi-kai.
Hanamata-kai	花又会	Tokyo	Akira Kiyono (清野 昭)	Formerly known as Hanamata-rengō-kai. Member of the Kanto-Shinno-Doushi-kai.
Masuya-kai	桝屋会	Tokyo	Sotojirō Higashiura (東浦 外次郎)	Formerly known as Zen-Masuya-rengō-kai. Member of the Kanto-Shinno-Doushi-kai.
Matsuzakaya-ikka V	五代目松坂屋一家	Tokyo	Takichi Nishimura (西村 太吉)	
Ametoku-rengō-kai	飴德連合会	Kanagawa	Hideya Nagamochi? (永持 英哉)	Ametoku is the nickname of the first boss. Member of the Kanto-Shinno-Doushi-kai.
Tokuriki-ikka V	五代目徳力一家	Kanagawa	unknown	Member of the Kanto-Shinno-Doushi-kai.
Yokohama-Kaneko-kai	横浜金子会	Kanagawa	Takashi Terada (寺田 隆)	Yokohama is a place name and Kaneko is the surname of the boss. Member of the Kanto-Shinno-Doushi-kai.
Sakurai-sōke IX	九代目櫻井總家	Shizuoka	Hiroyoshi Sano (佐野 宏好)	Successor to Kyutō-Sakurai-sōke-rengō-kai.
Chūkyō-Shinnō-kai	中京神農会	Aichi	Eizō Yamagashira? (山頭 栄三)	It was split from Dōyū-kai. Chūkyō is a place name and Shinno is Shennong, a mythical sage ruler of prehistoric China.
Marutomi-rengō-kai	丸富連合会	Kyoto	Satoshi Kitahashi? (北橋 斉)	
Sanshaku-gumi-honke IV	大阪四代目三尺組本家	Osaka	Aizō Tanaka (田中 愛造)	
Naoshima-Giyū-kai	直嶋義友会	Osaka	Tadashi Noda (野田 忠志)	Naoshima is the surname of the boss.
Kōbe-Hakurō-kai-sōhonbu V	五代目神戸博労会総本部	Hyōgo	Shikano Noboru? (鹿野 昇)	Kōbe and Hakurō is a place name.
Chūsei-kai	忠成会	Hyōgo	Tadaaki Ōmori (大森 匡晃)	
Matsuura-gumi III	三代目松浦組	Hyōgo	Sadaji Matsuda? (松田 貞次) Matsuura is the surname of the boss.	
Konjin-Tsumura-sōhonke II	二代目金神津村總本家	Hiroshima	Yoshisuke Tsumura? (津村 義輔)	Sōhonke means all family or head family.
Chūgoku-Takagi-kai III	三代目中国高木会	Hiroshima	Hideyoshi Daigen? (大源 秀吉)	Successor to Kyōsei-kai Murakami-gumi. Chūgoku is a place name and Takagi is the surname of the boss.
Kyūshū-Kashida-kai III	三代目九州樫田会	Fukuoka	Takashi Koga? (古賀 孝司)	Kyūshū is a place name and Kashida is the surname of the boss.
Tatekawa-kai? III	九州三代目立川会	Fukuoka	Toshihiko Ikeura (池浦 敏彦)	
Nakanishi-kai	中西会	Fukuoka	unknown	
Fujiie-kai?	藤家会	Fukuoka	Mitsuo Nakao (中尾 光男)	Fujiie is the surname of the boss.
Kyūshū-Kumashiro-rengō ?	九州神代連合	Saga	Katsuji Noguchi (野口 勝次)	
Kyūshū-Ozaki-kai II	二代目九州尾崎会	Nagasaki	Kuniyuki Koga (古賀 國行)	Ozaki is the surname of the boss.
Kumamoto-kai III	三代目熊本會	Kumamoto	Hidenori Morihara (森原 秀徳)	Successor to Kumamoto-rengō. Member of the Yonsha-kai.
Sanshin-kai	山心会	Kumamoto	Atsushi Inoue (井上 厚)	Successor to Kumamoto-rengō Yamano-kai. Formerly known as Sanshin-kai (山心会).
Murakami-gumi III	九州三代目村上組	Oita	Yoshishige Matsuoka (松岡 良茂)	Murakami is the surname of the boss.
Nishida-kai V	五代目西田会	Miyazaki	Kazuo Tanaka (田中 一夫)	

=== Other prominent bōryokudan ===
Name	Japanese name	Headquarters	Notes
Marumo-ikka	丸茂一家	Hokkaido	
Seiyū-kai	誠友会	Hokkaido	Merged with the Yamaguchi-gumi IV in 1985.
Zen-Chojiya-Hachiya-rengo-kai	全丁字家蜂谷連合会	Hokkaido	Disbanded in 1988, the remaining organizations have subscribed to Kenryu-kai and Kodo-kai.
Yorii-Sekiho-rengo	寄居関保連合	Hokkaido	Merged with the Yamaguchi-gumi.
Umeya-Abe-rengo-kai	梅家阿部連合会	Hokkaido	Merged with the Kodo-kai.
Kigure-ikka	木暮一家	Hokkaido	Merged with the Inagawa-kai.
Aizuya-ikka-Kodaka	会津家一家小高	Hokkaido	
Koshijiya-rengo	越路家連合	Hokkaido	Merged with the Inagawa-kai.
Kanto-Komatsuya-ikka	関東小松家一家	Hokkaido	
Oshu-Umeya-rengo-kai	奥州梅家連合会	Aomori	Merged with the Inagawa-kai.
Oshu-Saikaiya-so-rengo-kai	奥州西海家総連合会	Miyagi	Merged with the Sumiyoshi-kai.
Tokyo-Seidai-Nishikido-kai	東京盛代錦戸会	Miyagi	Merged with the Sumiyoshi-kai.
Tokyo-Seidai-Kawasaki-kai	東京盛代川崎会	Miyagi	Merged with the Sumiyoshi-kai.
Nishikata-ikka	西方一家	Miyagi	
Anegasaki-Yagami-kai	姉ケ崎八神会	Akita	Merged with the Inagawa-kai.
Aizuya-ikka-Nomoto	会津家一家野本	Akita	Merged with the Kyokuto-kai.
Oshu-Yamaguchi-rengo	奥州山口連合	Yamagata	Merged with the Sumiyoshi-kai.
Oshu-Aizu-Kakusada-ikka	奥州会津角定一家	Fukushima	Merged with the Yamaguchi-gumi.
Maruto-kai	丸唐会	Fukushima	Merged with the Sumiyoshi-kai.
Matsuba-kai-Doushi-kai	松葉会同志会	Ibaraki	Disbanded, then joined to the Matsuba-kai.
Shinwa-kai	親和会	Tochigi	Merged with the Sumiyoshi-kai.
Kochiya-kai	河内家会	Tochigi	Merged with the Kyokuto-kai.
Zennihon-Yorii-rengo-kai	全日本寄居連合会	Gunma	Disappeared.
Kanto-Kumaya-rengo	関東熊屋連合	Saitama	Merged with Kyokuto-kai.
Zennihon-Genseida-rengo-kai	全日本源清田連合会	Chiba	Disappeared.
Kanto-Chojamachi-kai	関東長者町会	Chiba	Merged with Sumiyoshi-kai.
Minato-kai	港会	Tokyo	Disbanded, then taken over by Sumiyoshi-kai.
Kohei-ikka	幸平一家	Tokyo	Merged with the Minato-kai.
Doshida-ikka	圡支田一家	Tokyo	
Sekine-gumi	関根組	Tokyo	Disbanded, then taken over by Matsuba-kai.
Ando-gumi (Azuma-kogyo)	安東組 (東興業)	Tokyo	Disbanded.
Tosei-kai	東声会	Tokyo	Merged with the Yamaguchi-gumi, then disbanded and taken over by Toa-kai.
Koganei-ikka	小金井一家	Tokyo	Merged with the Nibiki-kai.
Nibiki-kai	二率会	Tokyo	Disbanded.
Hokusei-kai	北星会	Tokyo	Disbanded.
Kowa-kai	交和会	Tokyo	Successor to the Hokusei-kai. Merged with the Inagawa-kai.
Namai-ikka	生井一家	Tokyo	Merged with the Kokusui-kai.
Ochiai-ikka	落合一家	Tokyo	Merged with the Kokusui-kai.
Aizuya-rengo-kai	會津家連合会	Tokyo	Merged with the Goto-gumi.
Tokyo-Yasuda-kai	東京安田会	Tokyo	Merged with the Rachi-gumi.
Kanto-Hayashi-gumi-rengo-kai	関東林組連合会	Tokyo	
Kyokuto-Aio-rengo-kai	極東愛桜連合会	Tokyo	Disbanded in 1967.
Ishimoto-kai	石元会	Tokyo	
Ryogoku-kai	両国会	Tokyo	
Kinsei-kai	錦政会	Tokyo	
Joman-ikka	上萬一家	Tokyo	
Gijin-to	義人党	Kawasaki, Kanagawa	Disbanded. The successor organization has joined the Sumiyoshi-kai.
Kanto-Hayashi-gumi-rengo-kai	関東林組連合会		
Yokohama-Saikaiya	横浜西海家	Kanagawa	Merged with the Kyokuto-kai.
Kawauchi-gumi	川内組	Fukui	Merged with the Sugatani-gumi.
Yamanashi-Kyōyū-kai	山梨侠友會	Yamanashi	Split from Inagawa-kai in 2011. "Yamanashi" refers the name of place. Disbanded in 2016, joined Inagawa-kai and renamed Sano-gumi.
Shinshu-Saito-ikka	信州斎藤一家	Nagano	
Yoshihama-kai	芳浜会	Gifu	
Ikeda-ikka	池田一家	Gifu	
Shimizu-ikka	清水一家	Shizuoka	Merged with the Yamaguchi-gumi.
	中泉一家	Shizuoka	
Reiganjima-Masuya-Hattori-kai	霊岸島桝屋服部会	Shizuoka	
Honganji-ikka	本願寺一家	Aichi	
Inabaji-ikka	稲葉地一家	Nagoya, Aichi	Merged with the Kodo-kai.
Unmeikyodo-kai	運命共同会	Aichi	Disbanded.
Hirai-ikka	平井一家	Toyohashi, Aichi	Merged with the Unmeikyodo-kai.
Tesshin-kai	鉄心会	Nagoya, Aichi	Merged with the Unmeikyodo-kai.
Chukyo-Asano-kai	中京浅野会	Aichi	Merged with the Unmeikyodo-kai.
Seto-ikka	瀬戸一家	Seto, Aichi	Merged with the Yamaguchi-gumi.
Doyu-kai	導友会	Nagoya, Aichi	Merged with the Kodo-kai.
Sankichi-ikka	三吉一家	Aichi	
Kira-ikka	吉良一家	Aichi	
Kusuriya-rengo-kai	薬屋連合会	Aichi	
Kumaya-ikka	熊屋一家	Aichi	
Nagoya-Chojamachi-ikka	名古屋長者町一家	Aichi	
Hiranoya-ikka	平野家一家	Nagoya, Aichi	Merged with the Kodo-kai.
Aio-kai	愛桜会	Mie	Merged with the Yamaguchi-gumi.
Kanbeya-ikka	神戸屋一家	Mie	
Shujiro-ikka	周次郎一家		
Kamijo-gumi	上條組	Mie	
Ise-Kanbe-ikka	伊勢神戸一家	Mie	
Ise-Kawashima-ikka	伊勢川島一家	Mie	
Tsunan-ikka	津南一家	Mie	
Mizutani-ikka	水谷一家	Mie	Merged with the Yamaguchi-gumi.
Ise-Kamiya-ikka	伊勢紙谷一家	Mie	
Nakajima-rengo-kai	中島連合会	Kyoto	Merged with the Aizu-Kotetsu-kai.
Sunakogawa-gumi	砂子川組	Osaka	Descended of Aizu Kotetsu.
Nakamasa-gumi	中政組	Osaka	Descended from of Aizu Kotetsu.
	小久一家	Osaka	
Nagamasa	長政	Osaka	
Dankuma-kai	淡熊会	Osaka, Osaka Prefecture	
Yamato-Nara-gumi	倭奈良組	Osaka	
Dajokan	大政官	Osaka	
I-rengo	い聯合	Osaka	
Yamaguchi-gumi Yanagawa-gumi	山口組 柳川組	Osaka	
Hayano-kai	早野会	Osaka	
Oguruma-Makoto-kai	小車誠会	Osaka	
Imanishi-gumi	今西組	Osaka	Merged with the Sakaume-gumi.
Ono-ikka	大野一家	Osaka	
Minami-ikka	南一家	Osaka	
Sumida-kai	澄田会	Osaka	
Matsuda-gumi (Matsuda-rengo)	松田組 (松田連合)	Osaka	
Hadani-gumi	波谷組	Osaka	Disbanded in 1994.
Komasa-gumi	小政組	Osaka	
Doi-gumi	土井組	Osaka	
	九紋龍組	Osaka	
Oshima-gumi	大嶋組	Hyōgo	
Honda-kai	本多会	Hyōgo	
Ichiwa-kai	一和会	Hyōgo	Disbanded.
Suwa-ikka	諏訪一家	Hyōgo	
Sasaki-gumi	佐々木組	Wakayama	
Takenaka-gumi	竹中組	Okayama	Withdrew from the Yamaguchi-gumi.
Kinoshita-kai	木下会	Okayama	
Takahashi-gumi	高橋組	Onomichi, Hiroshima Prefecture	
Katsuura-kai	勝浦会	Tokushima	Disbanded in 1998.
Mori-kai	森会	Tokushima	
Matsuyama-rengo-kai	松山連合会	Ehime	Merged with the Yamaguchi-gumi.
Kyushu-Kyoyu-rengo-kai	九州侠友連合会	Fukuoka	
Seibu-rengo	西武連合	Karatsu, Saga	
Kumamoto-rengo	熊本連合	Kumamoto	
Kitaoka-kai	北岡会	Kumamoto	
Daimon-kai	大門会	Kumamoto	

== Bibliography ==
- Bruno, A. (2007). "The Yakuza, the Japanese Mafia" CrimeLibrary: Time Warner
- Kaplan, David, Dubro Alec. (1986). Yakuza Addison-Wesley (ISBN 0-201-11151-9)
- Kaplan, David, Dubro Alec. (2003). Yakuza: Expanded Edition University of California Press (ISBN 0-520-21562-1)
- Hill, Peter B.E. (2003). The Japanese Mafia: Yakuza, Law, and the State Oxford University Press (ISBN 0-19-925752-3)
- Johnson, David T. (2001). The Japanese Way of Justice: Prosecuting Crime in Japan Oxford University Press (ISBN 0-19-511986-X)
- Miyazaki, Manabu. (2005) Toppamono: Outlaw. Radical. Suspect. My Life in Japan's Underworld Kotan Publishing (ISBN 0-9701716-2-5)
- Seymour, Christopher. (1996). Yakuza Diary Atlantic Monthly Press (ISBN 0-87113-604-X)
- Saga, Junichi., Bester, John. (1991) Confessions of a Yakuza: A Life in Japan's Underworld Kodansha America
- Schilling, Mark. (2003). The Yakuza Movie Book Stone Bridge Press (ISBN 1-880656-76-0)
- Sterling, Claire. (1994). Thieves' World Simon & Schuster (ISBN 0-671-74997-8)
- Sho Fumimura (Writer), Ryoichi Ikegami (Artist). (Series 1993–1997) "Sanctuary" Viz Communications Inc (Vol 1: ISBN 0-929279-97-2; Vol 2:ISBN 0-929279-99-9; Vol 3: ISBN 1-56931-042-4; Vol 4: ISBN 1-56931-039-4; Vol 5: ISBN 1-56931-112-9; Vol 6: ISBN 1-56931-199-4; Vol 7: ISBN 1-56931-184-6; Vol 8: ISBN 1-56931-207-9; Vol 9: ISBN 1-56931-235-4)
- Tendo, Shoko (2007). Yakuza Moon: Memoirs of a Gangster's Daughter Kodansha International (ISBN 978-4-7700-3042-9)
- Young Yakuza. Dir. Jean-Pierre Limosin. Cinema Epoch, 2007.
