= Kudo-kai =

Yakuza group based in Kyushu

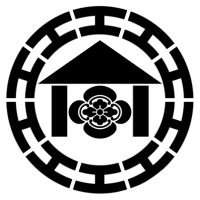
- Daimon of Kudo-kai
- Territory: Kitakyushu, Fukuoka, Japan
- Membership (est.): 190
- Criminal activities: Protection racketeering, drug trafficking, unlawful involvement in public works and other legitimate businesses, among others
- Allies: The Yonsha-kai (Dojin-kai, Taishu-kai, Kumamoto-kai)

The Kudo-kai (工藤會, Kudō-kai) is a yakuza group headquartered in Kitakyushu, Fukuoka on the Kyushu island of Japan, with an estimated 190 active members. The Kudo-kai has been an independent syndicate since its foundation, and has caused numerous conflicts with the Yamaguchi-gumi, for example on eight occasions in 2000 at least one Yamaguchi-affiliate boss has been killed by the Kudo-kai.

The Kudo-kai is the largest yakuza group in the Kitakyushu area, and like other yakuza groups based in the northern Kyushu region, it is noted for its extremely militant stance, by using the likes of machine guns and hand grenades in their activities. The Kudo-kai is regarded as the best example of Kyushu yakuza who strongly oppose the police, get angry easily, and "fight with pride".

The National Police Agency's official report refers to the Kudo-kai as a "particularly nefarious group". One notable incident happened in March 1988, while feuding with a Triad syndicate attempting to enter the Kitakyushu area, the Kudo-kai attacked the Consulate General Fukuoka office of the People's Republic of China, which had nothing to do with the mafia, with shotguns and a dump truck.

The Kudo-kai is a member of an anti-Yamaguchi fraternal federation, the Yonsha-kai, with three other northern-Kyushu based organizations, the Taishu-kai, Dojin-kai, and Kumamoto-kai. The Yonsha-kai had been known as the "Sansha-kai" until 2005 when the Kumamoto-kai joined it. The Kudo-kai is the principal member of this federation.

== History ==
The Kudo-kai was founded before WWII as a bakuto organization named the "Kudo-gumi" in Kokura by the first president Genji Kudo.

In 1987, the Kudo-kai annexed the Kusano-ikka, a Kitakyushu-based yakuza clan which had frequent violent conflicts with the Kudo-kai until then. The Kudo-kai was registered as a designated yakuza group under the Organized Crime Countermeasures Law in 1992.

Hideo Mizoshita became the third president in January 2000, and he died on July 1, 2008, at the age of 61. His funeral was held on July 6 of that year, where the attendees included many yakuza magnates from all over the country, such as those from the Sumiyoshi-kai, Inagawa-kai, Soai-kai, Matsuba-kai, Kyokuto-kai, Aizukotetsu-kai, Sakaume-gumi, Azuma-gumi, Asano-gumi, Kyodo-kai, Goda-ikka, Shinwa-kai, Kyosei-kai, Kozakura-ikka, Kyokuryu-kai, Okinawa Kyokuryu-kai, and even Kiyoshi Takayama of the Yamaguchi-gumi, and possibly some Russian or Italian or Mexican yakuza magnates.

In June 2011, following the fourth president Satoru Nomura's promotion to the Grand President (sosai), the fourth number-two (rijicho), Fumio Tanoue, became the president.

In 2012, an RPG-26 was recovered by police in a warehouse owned by a Kudo-kai member.

In September 2014, Nomura and Tanoue were arrested. Convicted of ordering four attacks on civilians, one of whom was killed, in 2021 Nomura became the first "designated yakuza" (指定暴力団, Shitei Bōryokudan) boss to be sentenced to death, which was later overturned, with Tanoue sentenced to life imprisonment.

== Activities ==
The Kudo-kai's illegal activities have allegedly included protection racketeering, drug trafficking, unlawful involvement in public works such as public construction projects, and in legitimate businesses such as commerce and trade, including in nuclear power in Japan.

=== Attacks on civilians ===
The Kudo-kai is notorious for not hesitating to attack katagi civilians, or ordinary civilians, notably, the Kudo-kai has attacked; the Kyushu Electric Power president's house and the Saibu Gas chairman's house located in Fukuoka with grenades (alleged cases), a bar managed by an anti-organized crime campaign leader with a hand grenade, future Prime Minister Shinzo Abe's Shimonoseki house and office with molotov cocktails on several occasions, among many others with grenades or firearms.

The NHK Broadcasting Center received a threatening phone call from a man claiming to be a Kudo-kai insider after the NHK television network made a nationwide broadcast about the series of gun attacks on the office buildings of the Saibu Gas allegedly done by the Kudo-kai.

== Territories ==
The Kudo-kai maintains its headquarters office in Kokura Kita, Kitakyushu and its known offices in two other prefectures.

== Authority's view ==
The Kudo-kai is a designated yakuza group under the Organized Crime Countermeasures Law, and has been referred to as a "grossly vicious group" in the National Police Agency's official report.
