= Hisayuki Machii =

Zainichi Korean yakuza boss (1923–2002)

- 町井 久之
- Machii featured on the cover of a posthumous biographical book
- Born: Jeong Geon-yeong; July 20, 1923; Minami-Sakuma Cho, Shiba Ward, Tokyo, Empire of Japan
- Died: September 14, 2002 (aged 79)
- Other name: "Ginza Tiger" (銀座の虎)

Hisayuki Machii (町井 久之, Machii Hisayuki; July 20, 1923 – September 14, 2002), born Jeong Geon-yeong (Korean: 정건영; Hanja: 鄭建永) was a Korean Japanese yakuza boss. He was nicknamed the "Ginza Tiger" (銀座の虎, Ginza no Tora), and was the founder of one of Japan's most notorious yakuza gangs, the Tosei-Kai.

== Biography ==
=== Early life ===
According to his widow Yasuyo, Machii was born Jeong Geon-yeong, a first-generation Korean of Minami-Sakuma Cho, Shiba Ward, Tokyo, Empire of Japan. His mother left him in the care of his grandmother in Seoul (at the time under Imperial Japanese occupation and known as Keijō). He returned to Tokyo when he was thirteen. After World War II, Machii became involved in postwar Japan's thriving black market. He entered Senshu University in 1943, however, he dropped out of it. By 1948, he had formed his own gang, the Tosei-kai or "Voice of the East Gang" which grew to over 1,500 members by the early 1960s. The Tosei-kai became so powerful in Tokyo that they were known as the Ginza police, and even the Yamaguchi-gumi's Taoka had to cut a deal with Machii to allow that group to operate in Tokyo.

=== Under the American occupation ===
Like fellow yakuza powerbroker Yoshio Kodama, Machii had good relations with the US occupation authorities due to his staunch anti-Communist stance: Tosei-kai soldiers were often used as strikebreakers during the occupation years. Machii himself worked with the United States Counter Intelligence Corps. While leaders of the Japanese yakuza were imprisoned or under close scrutiny by the American occupying forces, the Korean yakuza were free to take over the lucrative black markets. But rather than trying to rival the Japanese godfathers, Machii made alliances with them, and throughout his career, he remained close to both Kodama and Taoka.

Machii's vast empire included tourism, entertainment, bars and restaurants, prostitution, and oil importing. He and Kodama made a fortune on real estate investments alone. More importantly, he brokered deals between the Korean government and the yakuza that allowed Japanese criminals to set up rackets in Korea. Thanks to Machii, Korea became the yakuza's home away from home. Befitting his role as fixer between the underworlds of both countries, Machii was allowed to acquire the largest ferry service between Shimonoseki, Japan, and Busan, South Korea—the shortest route between the two countries.

=== Role in the kidnapping of Kim Dae-jung ===
He was widely believed to have helped the Korean Central Intelligence Agency kidnap then-leading Korean opposition leader Kim Dae-jung from a Tokyo hotel (see kidnapping of Kim Dae-jung). Kim was whisked out to sea where he was bound, gagged, blindfolded and fitted with weights so that his body would never surface. However, Kim was saved by the Japanese Coast Guard before he could be thrown overboard.

=== Successors to the Tosei-kai ===
By 1965, increasing police pressure led Machii to disband the Tosei-kai. But in their place, he formed two "legitimate" front organizations, the Toa Yuai Jigyo Kumiai (東亜友愛事業組合 East Asia Friendship Enterprises Association) and the Toa Sogo Kigyo (東亜相互企業 East Asia Enterprises Company), which was headed by Kodama.

The Toa Yuai Jigyo Kumiai, commonly known as the Toa-kai, is still an active yakuza gang in Japan with an estimated membership of 1,000. The group is still composed mostly of ethnic Koreans, Machii having paved the way for Korean involvement in the Japanese underworld. Machii himself retired in the 1980s.

=== Struggles involving the Pugwan Ferry ===
In the late 20th Century, following South Korea's increasing demand for travel due to the country's economic growth, the Busan-Shimonoseki Pugwan Ferry company attempted to expand into the Kyushu island, however the project was abandoned – several articles dated at that time reveal that nearly 70 Toa-kai members were shot or stabbed within a week in Tokyo, and it was strongly believed that the perpetrators, from the underworld, were those belonging to the Kudo-kai (controlling the Kokura Port) or the Dojin-kai (controlling most ports in western Kyushu). The Dojin-kai theory, which indicated that the Dojin-kai attempted to compel the Toa-kai to co-operate in drug trafficking but the Toa-kai rejected it and then the mass attacks started and continued until the Toa-kai determined to abandon the project and pay an outrageous amount of "settlement money" to the Dojin-kai, was more believed, as this type of gangland attack was historically the Dojin-kai's specialty but not the Kudo-kai's. Speculation exists that if Machii were active, this would never happen; at that time, the Toa-kai was headed by Morihiro Okita, the third-generation president with a bad reputation among the members due to his poor leadership. The Pugwan Ferry company's Hiroshima Port office opened in 2002 and had been active until 2005 before its closure. The Shimonoseki office is still active today.
