= Toa-kai =

Yakuza syndicate of mainly Koreans

- The daimon of the Toa-kai
- Founded: 1948
- Founded by: Hisayuki Machii
- Founding location: Ginza, Tokyo, Japan
- Years active: 1948–present
- Membership (est.): 20
- Leader: Yasushi Hayano

The Toa-kai (東亜会, Tōa-kai) is a yakuza syndicate based in Tokyo. Originally named the Tosei-kai (東声会, Tōsei-kai; "Voice of the East Gang"), with its historic leader Hisayuki Machii, the Toa-kai was deeply involved in the history of Tokyo's South Korean community and Japan's anti-communist circles in the 20th century.

== History ==
The group was formed by Hisayuki Machii, a Zainichi Korean mob boss, as the Tosei-kai in 1948. The Tosei-kai was originally a reported far-right organization of anti-communist activism led by Machii as a sympathizer of Kanji Ishiwara, which was in conflict with the North Korea-associated General Association of Korean Residents in Japan.

The Tosei-kai quickly became one of Tokyo's most powerful gangs, and had significantly expanded during the time of the post-war economic growth. Membership reached 1,500 in the 1960s. As the leader of the syndicate, Machii became an essential "fixer" between Japan and South Korea.

Increasing police crackdowns by 1965 forced Machii to disband the Tosei-kai and establish a new gang, the Toa Yuai Jigyo Kumiai (東亜友愛事業組合, Tōa Yūai Jigyō Kumiai), or "East Asia Friendship Enterprise Association". He also formed a "legitimate" company called the Toa Sogo Kigyo (東亜相互企業, Tōa Sōgo Kigyō), or East Asia Enterprises Company, and named power-broker Yoshio Kodama as chairman of the board. Afterwards, the Toa Yuai Jigyo Kumiai changed the name as Toa Yuai (東亜友愛, Tōa Yūai) and Toa-kai.

The founder Machii retired in the 1980s, and died of heart failure on September 14, 2002, in Tokyo. Also known as a successful businessman, he was 79.

== Condition ==
The Toa-kai is a member of a bakuto fraternal federation named the Kanto Hatsuka-kai, along with four other Kanto-based yakuza syndicates, the Sumiyoshi-kai, the Inagawa-kai, the Matsuba-kai, and the Soai-kai. The Toa-kai has aligned itself with the largest known Yamaguchi-gumi syndicate since the syndicate's Taoka era in the 20th century, and has been closely supported by Shinobu Tsukasa, the sixth-generation godfather of the Yamaguchi-gumi, since 2005 when the sixth era of the Yamaguchi-gumi officially started.

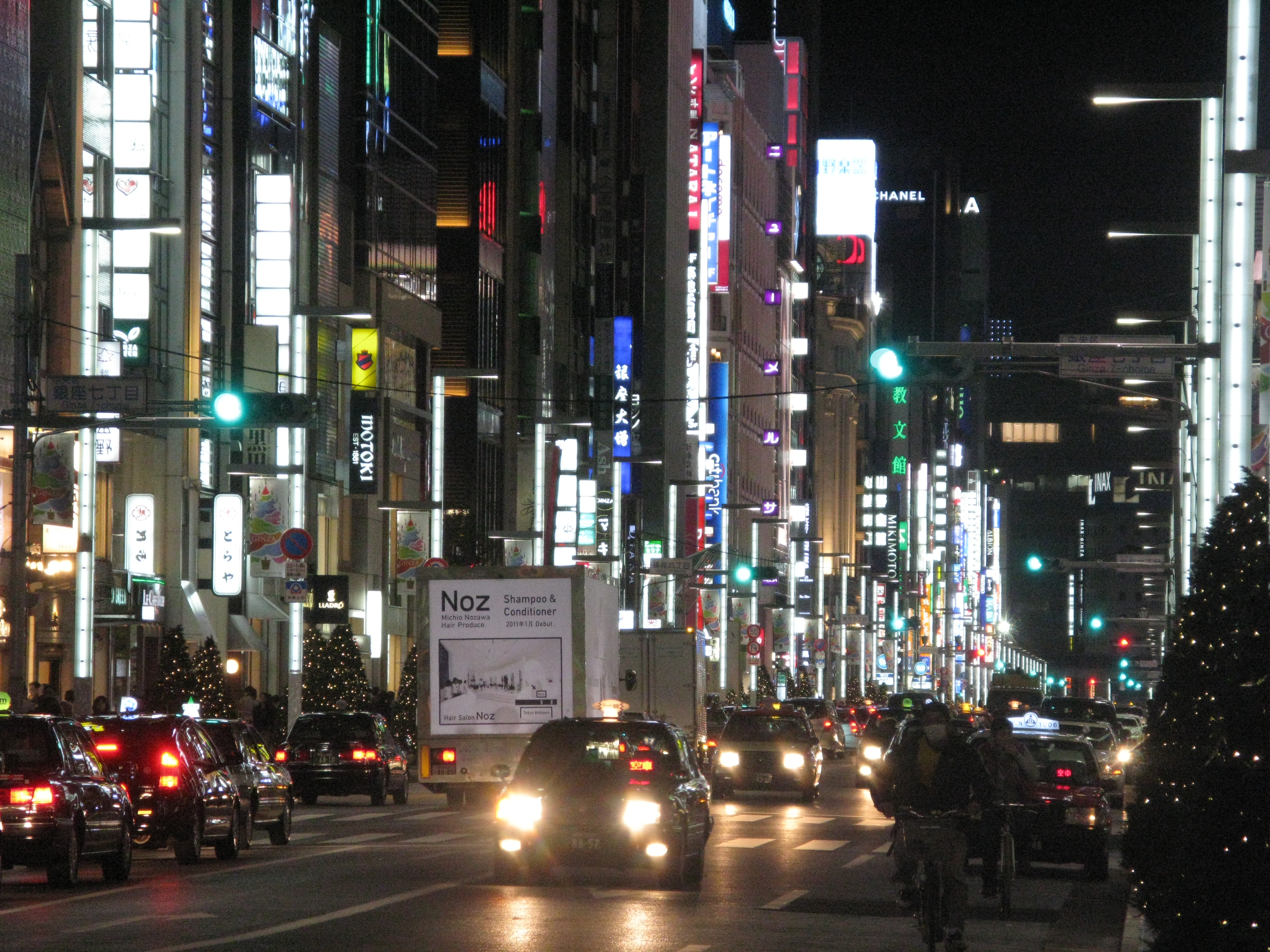
The Toa-kai once took control of Ginza, a large district in Tokyo.

=== Okinawa ===
The Toa-kai's notable branch organizations include the Yoshimi-kogyo (誼興業). Yoshimi-Kogyo was dissolved in 2012.

The origin of the Yoshimi-kogyo reportedly traces back to the late 20th century, when Toshio Gibo, an ethnic Okinawan mobster, formed an anti-left nationalist organization named the Makoto-kai in Okinawa under influence of Yoshio Kodama. Gibo met with Machii through Kodama, founding an affiliate of the Tosei-kai in Okinawa.

Okinawa's underworld has been known for its exclusiveness since the 20th century, where the dominating Kyokuryu-kai has persistently attacked and violently expelled any yakuza syndicate attempting to enter the island. The reason why the Toa-kai has been able to be active on the island may be because the group has historically been more oriented to legitimate businesses, and of its gentle stance, in contrast to other yakuza syndicates which have attempted to expand their influences into Okinawa with heavy violence, such as the Yamaguchi-gumi and especially the Dojin-kai. For example, in 2002 in Okinawa, only one Yoshimi member was arrested, while 56 Kyokuryu-kai members and 95 Okinawa Kyokuryu-kai members were arrested.

== Leadership ==
The founding leader, Machii, featured on the cover of a biographical book after his death

- 1st President: Hisayuki Machii
- 2nd president: Fujimatsu Hirano
- 3rd president: Morihiro Okita
- 4th president: Shohei Futamura
- 5th president: Yoshio Kaneumi
- 6th president: Yasumi Hayano
