= Seidō =

Seidō, Seido can mean:

- Seidokaikan, a style of full contact karate founded by Kazuyoshi Ishii.
- Kyushu Seido-kai, a yakuza organization based in Kyushu
- A fictional high school from Battlefield Baseball
- A realm in the fictional universe of Mortal Kombat
- A fictional high school from Ace of the Diamond
