= Fukuhaku-kai =

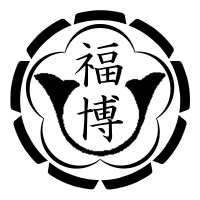
- The daimon of Fukuhaku-kai
- Founded: 1984; 42 years ago
- Founder: Akira Umedu
- Founding location: Fukuoka, Japan
- Membership: 60
- Leader: Kuniyasu Kaneshiro

The Fukuhaku-kai (福博会) is a yakuza organization based in Fukuoka on the Kyushu island of Japan. The Fukuhaku-kai is a designated yakuza group with an estimated membership of 60.

== History ==
The Fukuhaku-kai was registered as a designated yakuza organization under the Organized Crime Countermeasures Law in 2000.

== Condition ==
The Fukuhaku-kai is one of the five independent designated yakuza syndicates based in Fukuoka Prefecture, along with the Kudo-kai, the Taishu-kai, the Dojin-kai and the Kyushu Seido-kai. These northern-Kyushu based organizations, excluding the Kyushu Seido-kai, have formed an anti-Yamaguchi-gumi fraternal federation known as the Yonsha-kai. The Fukuhaku-kai has never been a member of this federation, however has caused at least one conflict with the Yamaguchi-gumi, which involved firearms, in 2004.

== Territory ==
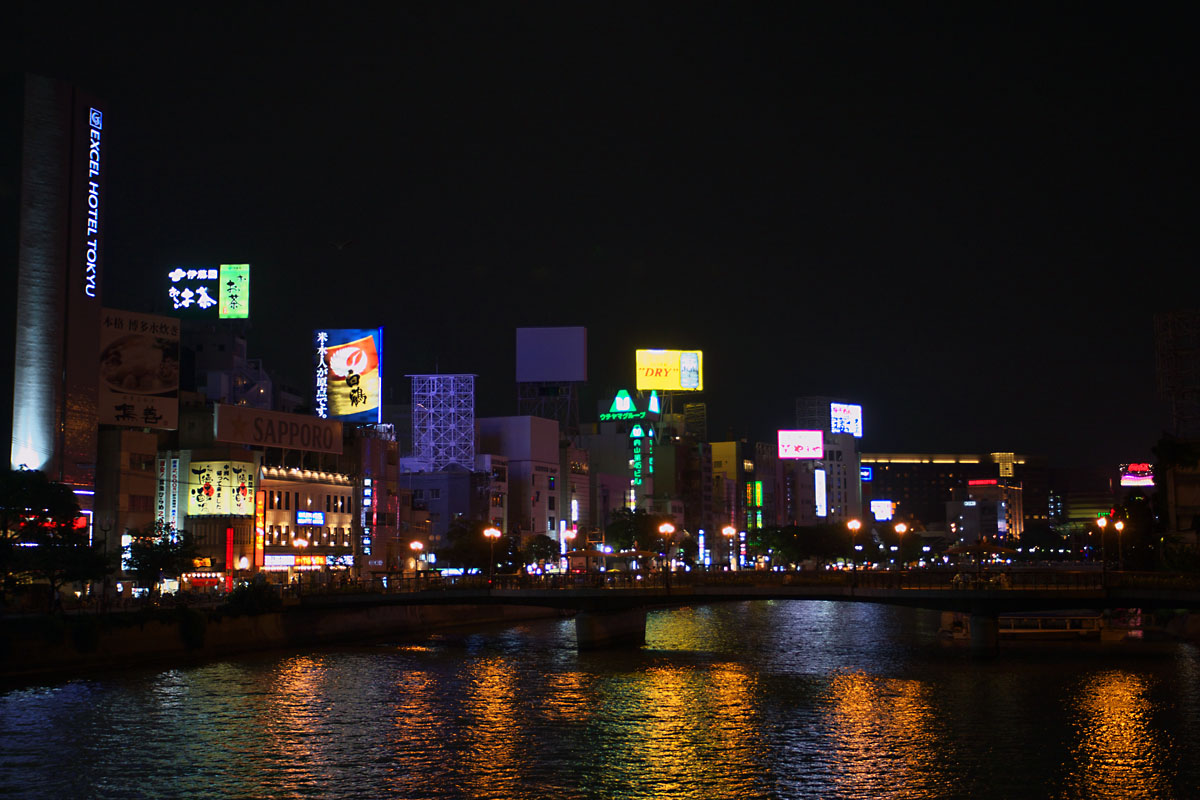
Nakasu

The Fukuhaku-kai has been in conflict with four different Yamaguchi-affiliates over the concessions of Nakasu, the largest red-light district in Kyushu, and also with the Dojin-kai and Kudo-kai over their attempts to enter the same territory.
