= Kazuyoshi =

- Gender: Male

Origin
- Origin: Japanese
- Meaning: Different meanings depending on the kanji used

Kazuyoshi (written: 和良, 和美, 和喜, 和佳, 和慶, 和義, 和嘉, 和幸, 知良, 一義, 一吉, 一良, 一慶, 一巖 or 一嘉) is a masculine Japanese given name. Notable people with the name include:

- Kazuyoshi Akaba (赤羽 一嘉; born 1958), Japanese politician
- Kazuyoshi Akiyama (秋山 和慶; 1941–2025), Japanese conductor
- Fujiazuma Kazuyoshi (富士東 和佳; born 1987), Japanese sumo wrestler
- Kazuyoshi Funaki (船木 和喜; born 1975), Japanese ski jumper
- Kazuyoshi Hoshino (星野 一義; born 1947), Japanese racing driver and businessman
- Kazuyoshi Ishii (石井 和義; born 1953), Japanese karateka
- Kazuyoshi Ishikawa (石川 和義; born 1982), Japanese triple jumper
- Kazuyoshi Itō (伊藤 和幸), Japanese astronomer
- Kazuyoshi Kaneko (金子 一義; born 1942), Japanese politician
- Kazuyoshi Katayama (片山 一良), Japanese anime director
- Kotoyūki Kazuyoshi (琴勇輝 一巖; born 1991), Japanese sumo wrestler
- Kazuyoshi Kino (紀野 一義; 1922–2013), Japanese Buddhist scholar
- Kazuyoshi Kudo (工藤 和義; 1930s–2007), Japanese Yakuza member
- Kazuyoshi Kumakiri (熊切 和嘉; born 1974), Japanese film director
- Kazuyoshi Matsunaga (松永 一慶; born 1977), Japanese footballer
- Kazuyoshi Mikami (三上 和良; born 1975), Japanese footballer
- Kazuyoshi Miura (三浦 知良; born 1967), Japanese footballer
- Kazuyoshi Miura (businessman) (三浦 和義; 1947–2008), Japanese businessman
- Kazuyoshi Nakamura (中村 一義; born 1955), Japanese footballer
- Kazuyoshi Nakanishi (中西 一善), Japanese politician
- Kazuyoshi Nomachi (野町 和嘉; born 1946), Japanese photographer
- Kazuyoshi Oimatsu (老松 一吉; 1911–2001), Japanese figure skater and coach
- Kazuyoshi Saito (斉藤 和義; born 1966), Japanese singer-songwriter
- Kazuyoshi Sekine (関根 和美; born 1954), Japanese film director
- Kazuyoshi Shirahama (白浜 一良; born 1947), Japanese politician
- Kazuyoshi Tatsunami (立浪 和義; born 1969), Japanese baseball player
- Kazuyoshi Yokota (横田 和善; died 2011), Japanese anime director
