= Yamano =

Yamano may refer to:

- Yamano Music, a famous CD shop of Japan. the head office is Ginza.
- Aiko Yamano, a Japanese beautician and founder of Yamano group.
- Atsuko Yamano, a founding member of the Japanese rock trio Shonen Knife
- Naoko Yamano, a founding member of the Japanese rock trio Shonen Knife
- Takayoshi Yamano, a former Japanese football player
- Sharin Yamano, a Japanese manga creator
- Yamano-kai, a now-disbanded yakuza gang based in Kumamoto, Kyūshū, Japan
- Satoko Yamano (voice actress), a Japanese voice actress
- Yamano College of Aesthetics, a private junior college in Hachioji, Tokyo, Japan
