= Kizuna-kai =

Yakuza organization based in Hyogo, Japan

- Founded: April 30, 2017; 9 years ago
- Founder: Yoshinori Oda (Kim Jong-ki)
- Founding location: Amagasaki, Hyogo, Japan
- Years active: 2017–present
- Membership: 50 members 70 quasi-members
- Allies: Ikeda-gumi
- Rivals: Yamaguchi-gumi; Kobe Yamaguchi-gumi

The Kizuna-kai (絆會) is a yakuza organization based in Hyogo, Japan.

It was originally formed on April 30, 2017 by some direct members of the Kobe Yamaguchi-gumi, which in turn was split from the Yamaguchi-gumi. Initially, they called themselves Ninkyo-dantai-Yamaguchi-gumi, a nincho organization using the kanji character for personal names, 俠. Thereafter, on August 9, the name was changed to Ninkyo Yamaguchi-gumi, using the slang word kyo for the reasons described below. Furthermore, on January 12, 2020, the name was changed to the current name, removing the name Yamaguchi-gumi.

== History ==
=== Formation ===
The Yamaguchi-gumi, a designated organized crime group, split in the summer of 2015, and some members formed the Kobe Yamaguchi-gumi. However, on April 30, 2017, some members of the Kobe Yamaguchi-gumi rebelled and formed the Ninkyo-dantai-Yamaguchi-gumi. As a result, the organized crime group that originated from the Yamaguchi-gumi was split into three factions.

At the founding ceremony on April 30, 2017, the organization did not have a nominal chief, but instead the fourth generation Yamaken-gumi vice-chairman (Headquarters), the core organization of the Kobe Yamaguchi-gumi affiliate. The organization is headed by Yosinori Oda (Note: Oda was 50 years old at the time. He was the acting Wakagashira of the Kobe Yamaguchi-gumi.) and the number-two (wakagashira) at the time was Koji Ikeda. (Note: Ikeda was 50 years old at the time and a junior assistant in the Kobe Yamaguchi-gumi) It has been pointed out that the Ninkyo-dantai-Yamaguchi-gumi has an organizational form that avoids violence and the law, but the police authorities are in a state of internal conflict rather than division. The organization has been subjected to regulations under the anti-bouto law. Furthermore, on May 7, Ikeda and others attended the formation ceremony of the Keiji Union, which had split from the 6th generation Yamaguchi-gumi-affiliated Tankai-ikka, and it is believed that this group also joined the Ninkyo-dantai-Yamaguchi-gumi.

On August 9, the organization's name was changed to Ninkyo Yamaguchi-gumi. The main reason for the name change is that when news organizations reported on the old organization name, the Ninkyo-dantai-Yamaguchi-gumi, was not correctly written in the media. It is said that this was due to growing dissatisfaction from both inside and outside the country due to its poor appearance.

=== Road to designation ===
On September 12, 2017, an armed group shot at a convoy carrying representative Oda and others on a street in Nagata-ku, Kobe. Oda lived near the scene and was attacked by men waiting for him immediately after leaving his home. The vehicle he was riding in drove away from the scene, and Oda was not injured, but one member of the gang (44 years old at the time), who was his bodyguard, was shot and killed. On March 22, 2018, the Ninkyo Yamaguchi-gumi was designated as a designated bōryokudan by the Hyogo Prefecture Public Safety Commission. In September of the same year, the Kobe District Court approved an application for a provisional injunction to prohibit the use of the Yondaime Manabe-gumi office, which was also used as the Ninkyo Yamaguchi-gumi's headquarters office.

On February 17, 2020, the Hyogo Prefectural Public Safety Commission announced in the official gazette that the name of the organization had been changed to Kizuna-kai. The reason for the name change appears to be to clarify the difference between the Yamaguchi-gumi, which is designated as a designated organized crime group, and the Kobe Yamaguchi-gumi. On August 11, Koji Ikeda, who had become a young leader, submitted a notification of dissolution of the 4th generation Manabe-gumi to the Amagasaki police station, the group was disbanded, and Ikeda visited the 6th Yamaguchi-gumi headquarters the following month, apologized, and officially retired. In late February 2022, the third generation Oda Kogyo chairman, Satoshi Gondo, who was the top executive, submitted a notice of withdrawal to the Osaka Prefectural Police and was expelled from Kizuna-kai on March 2.

== See also ==
- List of Yakuza syndicates
