= Shibuya incident =

1946 gang fight in Tokyo, Japan

Shibuya Incident
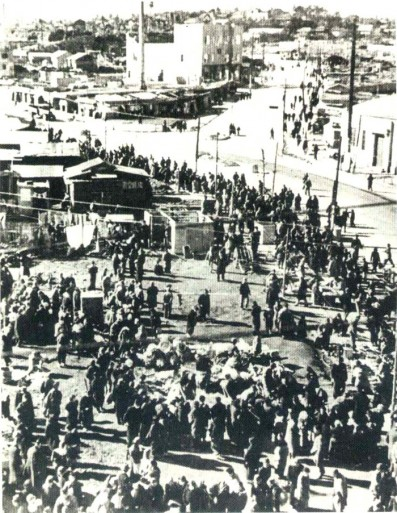
- Shibuya, Tokyo, in 1945.
- Date: June 1946

Parties
Tokyo Metropolitan Police Department; Yakuza (Matsuba-kai)	Taiwanese mob

Number
400+ police officers 120+ yakuza gangsters	100+ mobsters

Casualties and losses
1 dead	7 dead 34 injured 28 arrested

The Shibuya incident (Japanese: 渋谷事件, Hepburn: Shibuya jiken) was a violent confrontation which occurred in June 1946 between rival gangs near Shibuya Station in Tokyo, Japan. The years after World War II saw Japan as a defeated nation and the Japanese people had to improvise in many aspects of daily life. In the chaos of the post-war recovery, large and very lucrative black markets opened throughout Japan. Various gangs fought for control over them. There were also many non-Japanese "third nationals" in post-war Japan. These "third nationals" or "third-country people" were former subjects of the Empire of Japan whose citizenship then transferred to other countries like China and Korea. The Shibuya incident involved former Japanese citizens from the Japanese province of Taiwan fighting against native Japanese yakuza gangs. After the fight, the Chinese nationalist government stepped forward to defend the Taiwanese.

== Background ==
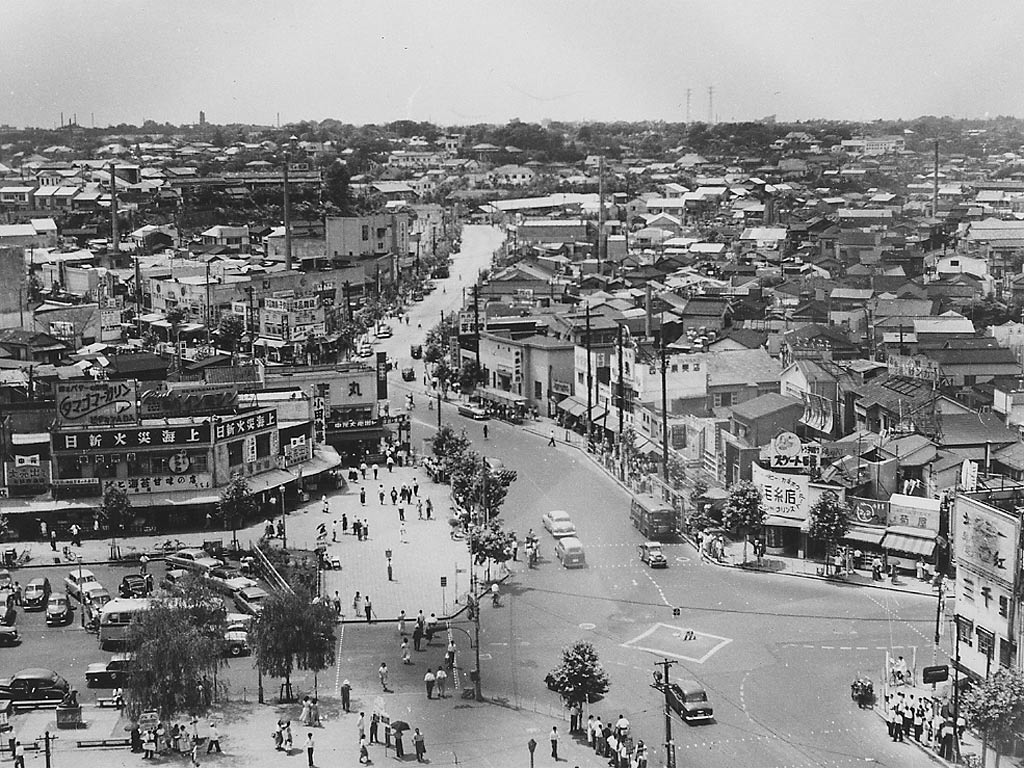
Shibuya, Tokyo, in 1952.

=== Post-war Japan ===
The air raids left millions displaced in urban centers, and food shortages, created by bad harvests and the demands of the war, worsened when the importation of food from Korea, Taiwan, and China ceased. Repatriation of Japanese living in other parts of Asia only aggravated the problems in Japan as these displaced people put more strain on already scarce resources. Over 5.1 million Japanese returned to Japan during the fifteen months following October 1, 1945. Alcohol and drug abuse became major problems. Deep exhaustion, declining morale, and despair was so widespread that it was termed the "kyodatsu condition" (虚脱状態, kyodatsujoutai; lit. "state of lethargy"). Inflation was rampant and many people turned to the black market for even the most basic goods.

=== Black markets ===
The black markets were among the first economic entities to spring up after the defeat of Japan. People who were desperate for food and basic necessities turned to the black market with its inflated prices as the official lines of supply and stores had either been destroyed or had nothing to sell. Four days after the surrender of Japan on August 15, 1945, (Japan Time), Ozu Kinosuke and his gang placed an ad in newspapers asking for factory owners, who up to that point only sold to the military, to come to gang headquarters and discuss distribution of their products. In Shinjuku, Tokyo, the Ozu gang then created a large market near the station and by September 1945 had an enormous sign with 117 hundred-watt bulbs advertising its location; it was so bright that it could be seen from several miles away. Profits were huge, and the vendors – who were known as "peanuts" – earned as much as 50 yen a day (by comparison, teachers were paid a monthly salary of 300 yen). Other gangs followed suit and all over Japan open-air markets sprang up. About 30% of those working in the markets were "third-country people".

=== Third-country people ===
After the Empire of Japan's surrender, the territories it had controlled (often for decades) were broken up to form new countries, like North and South Korea, or occupied by Allied Powers. In response, the Japanese government regarded peoples of these places as foreigners, though they still had Japanese citizenship. Many thousands of these people had decided to emigrate to Japan. They were called "third-country people" or "third-national people" (daisan-kokujin in Japanese). With no work for even the Japanese and with thousands of refugees returning from the former colonies every day, there was little chance for third-country people to find work and so they turned en masse to the black markets and other underworld activities.

== Turf war ==
With vast amounts of money to be made and simmering racist undercurrents, fights for control of the markets were probably inevitable. In June 1946 fights broke out between Taiwanese gangs and a Japanese yakuza group, Matsuba-kai. Outside the Shibuya police station over a thousand Matsuba members fought hundreds of Taiwanese gang members with clubs, metal pipes and some small firearms. Seven Taiwanese were killed and thirty-four wounded. The Japanese police suffered casualties too: one policeman was killed and another injured. The Japanese public were outraged by the chaos and blamed the non-Japanese Asians and the incompetence of the Japanese police. Tensions between the Korean and Taiwanese communities mounted.

More than forty Taiwanese men were arrested in connection with the incident, but their cases were quickly taken up by the Chinese component of Allied command in Tokyo. The men were given a very public trial and the Japanese government was also forced to put the Tokyo policemen who were involved in the incident on trial, something that was unheard of in Japan. The trial resulted in thirty-five convictions; sentences were either hard labor or deportation. The trial put a spotlight on the Chinese population in Japan; the Chinese used their influence in Allied command to grant special status to ethnic Chinese, and gave them special rights including extra rations, a privilege that was not granted to ethnic Koreans.

== In media ==
- In Tokyo Year Zero (about the serial killer Yoshio Kodaira), by David Peace, the book describes the fight and the police reaction to it.
