= Kazuyoshi Kudo =

Japanese yakuza member

Kazuyoshi Kudo (工藤 和義, Kudō Kazuyoshi; 1937? – February 15, 2007) was a Japanese organized crime figure. He was the 4th head of the Kokusui-kai, a Tokyo-based yakuza gang. He was also the 7th socho of Kanamachi-ikka.

In August 2005, Kudo shocked the yakuza world when he became sworn brothers with new Yamaguchi-gumi godfather Kenichi Shinoda in a sakazuki (sake-sharing) ceremony. As a result of the ritual, the Kokusui-kai became an affiliate of their former enemies, the Yamaguchi-gumi.

On February 15, 2007, he was found dead bleeding from an apparent self-inflicted gunshot wound. The suicide followed a rash of shootings and retaliations between Kokusui-kai and a rival gang, Sumiyoshi-kai, over gang territory, including the shooting death of Sumiyoshi-kai's boss. The shootings ended with an agreement between the Kokusui-kai and Yamaguchi-gumi to stop fighting on 8 February.
