= Kobe Yamaguchi-gumi =

Yakuza organization based in Hyogo, Japan

- "Yamabishi" (山菱), the daimon of the Kobe Yamaguchi-gumi
- Founded: 2021
- Founder: Kunio Inoue
- Founding location: Hyogo, Japan
- Years active: 2021–present
- Territory: Kobe
- Membership: 110 members 170 quasi-members
- Leader: Kunio Inoue
- Rivals: The Sixth Yamaguchi-gumi, Kizuna Kai

The Kobe Yamaguchi-gumi (神戸山口組) is a yakuza organization based in Hyogo, Japan.

== Overview ==
The Kobe Yamaguchi-gumi yakuza organization included Kobe-based Yamaken-gumi, Osaka-based Takumi-gumi, and Kyoyu-kai (ja). They broke away from The Sixth Yamaguchi-gumi in 2021 and formed a new group called Kobe Yamaguchi-gumi. The authorities closely monitored this split to try and relax tensions that exist between the groups. Since August there has been a slight increase in crimes throughout the country ranging from shootings to office attacks. It was not until 15 April 2023, when authorities designated the Kobe Yamaguchi-gumi as a crime syndicate.

At the time of its formation in 2021, Kobe Yamaguchi-gumi had 2,500 members, about half of the 6,000 members of Yamaguchi-gumi. However, as Yamaken-gumi, the core organisation of Kobe Yamaguchi-gumi, rejoined Yamaguchi-gumi, Kizuna-kai, Takumi-gumi and Ikeda-gumi (ja) split, and Masaki-gumi (ja) and Kyoyu-kai disbanded, by 2024 Kobe Yamaguchi-gumi had only 120 members, 2% of Yamaguchigumi's 3,200 members.

== See also ==
- List of Yakuza syndicates
