= Sangokujin =

Offensive Japanese term for minorities

Sangokujin (三国人; lit. third country's citizen) is a Japanese term referring to the various former colonial subjects of the Empire of Japan in the aftermath of World War II. This term particularly applied to Koreans and Taiwanese people, although it also sometimes was used for Ryukyuan people. The term is now generally considered antiquated and offensive.

== Concept ==
In the immediate aftermath of the war, the legal status of Korean and Taiwanese nationals in Japan was not clear. The occupying American force enjoyed immunity from the Japanese legal system. Some Korean and Taiwanese people in Japan insisted that, since they were from liberated countries, they were no longer under the jurisdiction of the Japanese Imperial government. This resulted in many underprivileged Taiwanese and Korean people previously living under colonial rule forming criminal gangs such as the Yamiichi (闇市), a black market which was against the rationing system which continued after the war. The occasional clashes of these gangs and Japanese police were widely reported by the newspapers at the time. One such incident was the Shibuya incident. As the country's administration was composed of Japanese and Americans, many of these rioters were referred to as daisangokujin (第三国人; lit. third country's citizen), with Japan and America being the implied two countries. Soon, many Japanese began to associate the term Sangokujin specifically with criminals of Taiwanese and Korean origin.

As the country became more stable, the term became something of an anachronism and was mostly forgotten. However, the use of the term was revived when the nationalist Tokyo Metropolitan Governor Shintaro Ishihara used it in an April 9, 2000 address to the Japanese Self Defense Forces (JSDF). In the speech, Ishihara suggested that the JSDF would be needed to suppress Sangokujin criminal activity in the event of a catastrophic disaster in Tokyo.

I referred to the "many sangokujin who entered Japan illegally." I thought some people would not know that word so I paraphrased it and used gaikokujin, or foreigners. But it was a newspaper holiday so the news agencies consciously picked up the sangokujin part, causing the problem.

... After World War II, when Japan lost, the Chinese of Taiwanese origin and people from the Korean Peninsula persecuted, robbed and sometimes beat up Japanese. It's at that time the word was used, so it was not derogatory. Rather we were afraid of them.

... There's no need for an apology. I was surprised that there was a big reaction to my speech. In order not to cause any misunderstanding, I decided I will no longer use that word. It is regrettable that the word was interpreted in the way it was.

The governor later stated, "What is wrong with calling Sangokujins 'Sangokujins'?" Ishihara insisted that the term is a neutral reference to the Zainichi population for his generation. This provoked discussion about the political correctness of the term and whether or not colonialism of Korea and Taiwan is by itself an act of robbery of resources and native cultures.

== See also ==
- List of territories acquired by the Empire of Japan
- Chinese in Japan
- Zainichi Korean
- Discrimination
- Ethnic issues in Japan
- Gaikokujin
- Japanese nationalism
- Untermensch
- The Erased
