= Matsuba-kai =

- 松葉会
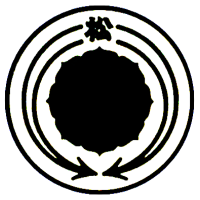
- Daimon of Matsuba-kai
- Founded: March 1953
- Founding location: Tokyo
- Years active: 1953–present
- Territory: Kantō region of Japan
- Ethnicity: Japanese
- Membership: 280 (2024 estimate)
- Leader: Yoshimasa Itō
- Activities: Organized crime

The Matsuba-kai (松葉会), meaning "Pine Needle Society," is a yakuza organization based in Tokyo, Japan. The Matsuba-kai is a designated yakuza group with an estimated 280 active members as of 2024.

The Matsuba-kai is a member of a yakuza fraternal federation named the Kantō Hatsuka-kai, along with four other Kantō-based yakuza syndicates, the Sumiyoshi-kai, the Inagawa-kai, the Toa-kai, and the Soai-kai.

== History ==
The precursor to the Matsuba-kai was the Sekine-gumi (関根組), a yakuza gang founded in Sumida, Tokyo in 1936 by a bakuto named Masaru Sekine. In 1946, they were involved in the Shibuya incident where they fought for control of the local black markets. The Sekine-gumi rapidly expanded, but in 1947 many members were arrested by US occupation authorities for firearms possession, resulting in the group's disbandment. Thereafter, remnants of the gang came together with the remnants of another gang, the Fujita-gumi, to found a new organization called the "Matsuba-kai" in March 1953.

In April 1960, Matsuba-kai thugs ransacked the Tokyo headquarters of the Mainichi Shimbun newspaper in revenge for unfavorable coverage. In late 1960 and early 1961, members of the Matsuba-kai mounted protests outside the offices of the literary magazine Chūō Kōron in protest of magazine's publication of Shichirō Fukazawa's short story "The Tale of an Elegant Dream” (Fūryū mutan), which described the beheading of the Imperial family with a guillotine.

In the 1980s the gang was caught smuggling 12 kilos of heroin into Canada.

The Matsuba-kai was registered as a designated yakuza group under the Organized Crime Countermeasures Law in 1994.

In the early 2000s the Matsuba-kai was involved in a violent feud with the rival Kyokuto-kai, which led to a number of shootings.
