= Honda-kai =

The Honda-kai (本多会) were a Japanese yakuza gang active in Kobe in the middle of the 20th century.

The Honda-kai was a "bakuto" gang, mainly devoted to illegal gambling. After World War II, they formed an alliance with the Yamaguchi-gumi syndicate, then growing under the leadership of Kazuo Taoka. But the power-sharing arrangement was unsuitable to Taoka, and the Honda-kai were soon absorbed into the Yamaguchi-gumi's ranks and ceased to be an independent operation.

It is believed that an American Yamaguchi-gumi syndicate began utilizing the Honda-kai (本多会) name in the mid-2000s.
