= Shinwa-kai =

Yakuza group

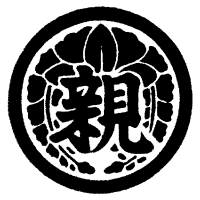
Daimon of Shinwa-kai

The Shinwa-kai (親和会) is a yakuza group based in Takamatsu, Kagawa on Shikoku, Japan. It has an estimated 30 active members.

== History ==
The Takamatsu Shinwa-kai was renamed the Shinwa-kai in 1971. The Shinwa-kai was registered as a designated yakuza group in December 1992.

== Condition ==
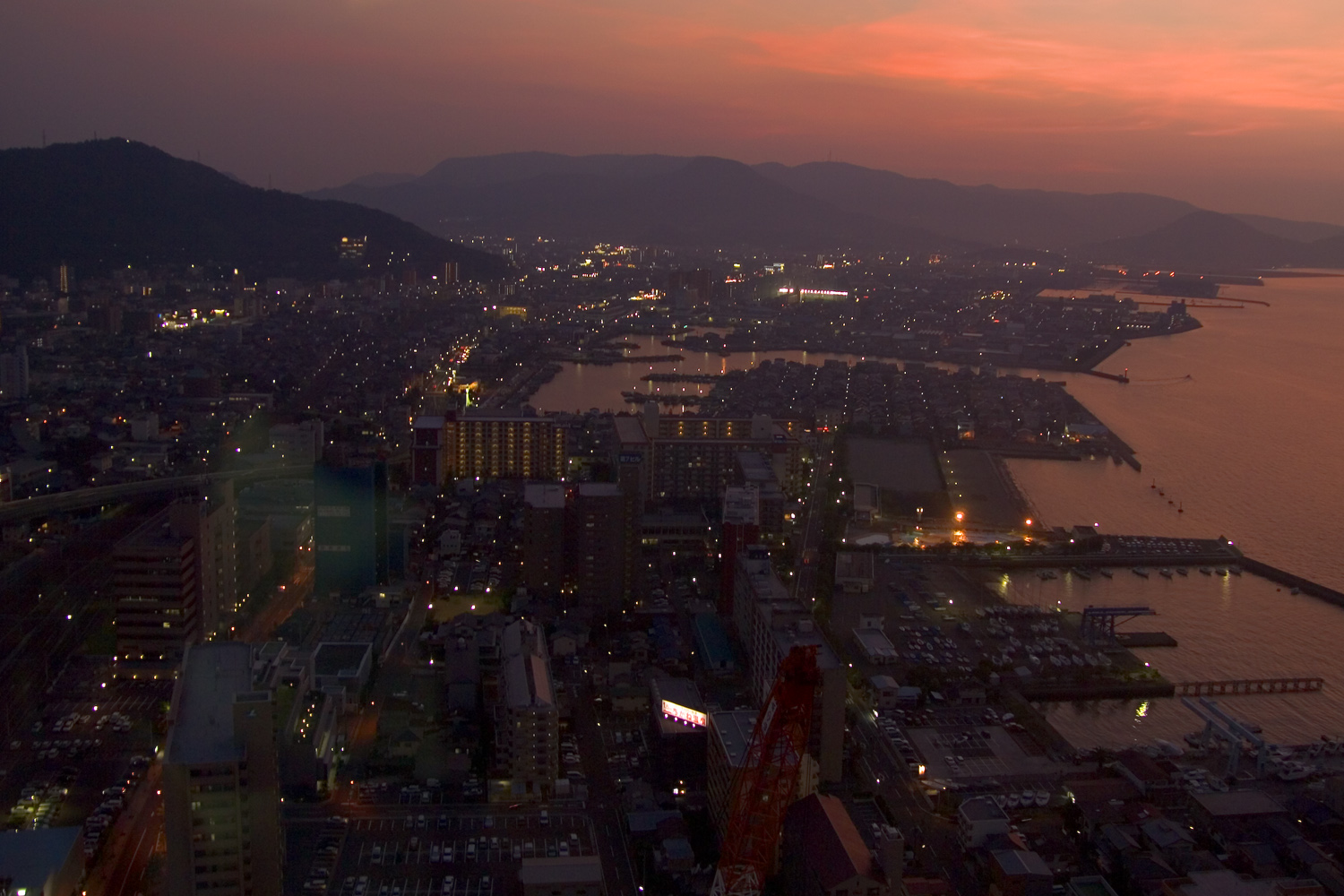
Takamatsu

The Shinwa-kai has been based in Takamatsu, Kagawa, ever since its formation, and is the only designated yakuza group based in the Shikoku region. The Shinwa-kai is one of the four designated yakuza syndicates active in Kagawa Prefecture, along with the Yamaguchi-gumi, the Sumiyoshi-kai, and the Kyodo-kai.

Since 1996, the Shinwa-kai has been a member of an anti-Yamaguchi federation named the Gosha-kai, along with four Chugoku-based organizations, the Kyosei-kai, the Kyodo-kai, the Goda-ikka, and the Asano-gumi.
