= Taishu-kai =

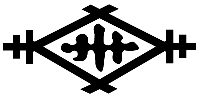
The daimon of the Taishu-kai

The Taishu-kai (太州会, Taishū-kai) is a yakuza organization based in Fukuoka Prefecture on the Kyushu island of Japan, with an estimated 60 active members.

== History ==
The Taishu-kai was formed around 1954 under the name "Ota Group" (太田グループ, Ōta Gurūpu) by Kuniharu Ota (太田 州春, Ōta Kuniharu), a mineworker who became the first president. The Ota Group was later renamed the "Ota-gumi" (太田組, Ōta-gumi), and again renamed the "Taishu-kai" in May 1973. Yoshihito Tanaka (or Yoshito Tanaka) succeeded Ota in December 1991.

== Condition ==
Headquartered in Tagawa, Fukuoka, the Taishu-kai is one of the five independent Fukuoka-based designated yakuza syndicates, along with the Kudo-kai, the Dojin-kai, the Fukuhaku-kai and the Kyushu Seido-kai.

The Taishu-kai is a member of an anti-Yamaguchi-gumi fraternal federation, the "Yonsha-kai", along with the Kitakyushu-based Kudo-kai, the Kurume-based Dojin-kai and the Kumamoto-based Kumamoto-kai.
