= Kyushu Seido-kai =

Yakuza organization formerly based in Fukuoka Prefecture, Japan

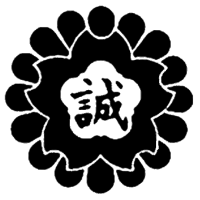
- Daimon of Kyushu Seido-kai
- Founding location: Omuta, Fukuoka, Japan
- Years active: 2006 - June 11th, 2013 (Kyushu Seido-kai); 2013 -2015 (Namikawa Mutsumi-kai); 2015 - (Namikawa-kai)
- Membership (est.): 130
- Criminal activities: Drug trafficking, loansharking, among others
- Rivals: Dojin-kai

The Kyushu Seido-kai (九州誠道会, Kyūshū Seidō-kai) was a yakuza organization based in Fukuoka Prefecture on the Kyushu island of Japan, with an estimated 150 active members. Headquartered in the southern Fukuoka region of Omuta, the Kyushu Seido-kai maintains its offices in five other prefectures including Tokyo.

Since its formation, the Kyushu Seido-kai has been known for its blatant armed conflicts with its former parent syndicate, the Dojin-kai, involving various hazardous weapons such as automatic firearms (especially the AK-47), petrol bombs and hand grenades.

While violently feuding with the Dojin-kai, the Kyushu Seido-kai has caused deaths among several innocent civilians as well as numerous yakuza members, and because of that, despite being a relatively recently established group, the Kyushu Seido-kai has been a designated yakuza group since 2008.

In October 2013, the organization changed its name to Namikawa Mutsumi-kai, and in 2015, it was renamed Namikawa-kai.

== History ==
The Kyushu Seido-kai launched in 2006 as the Dojin-kai's splinter group led by the Omuta-based Murakami-ikka clan, after the long-time Dojin-kai boss Seijiro Matsuo announced his resignation, sparking a war of succession. In 2007 a Dojin-kai member attempted to murder a Seido-kai member, but ended up killing an innocent bystander. The Kyushu Seido-kai ended up receiving official registration as a designated yakuza group under the Organized Crime Countermeasures Law on February 28, 2008.

In 2011, the Seido-kai's feud with the Dojin-kai escalated, and many Seido members were killed by the Dojin-kai; two Seido seniors were killed by alleged Dojin-kai's grenades in Omuta (April), one Seido member was stabbed to death in Ogi, Saga (April), and one Seido senior was shot to death in Imari, Saga (April).

== Condition ==
The Kyushu Seido-kai is one of the five independent Fukuoka-based designated yakuza syndicates, along with the Kudo-kai, the Taishu-kai, the Fukuhaku-kai, and the Dojin-kai. The Kyushu Seido-kai maintains its offices in six prefectures; Fukuoka, Saga, Nagasaki, Kumamoto, Yamagata, and Tokyo.

In 2008, the Kudo-kai's third-generation president Hideo Mizoshita died and his funeral was attended by many yakuza magnates representing their respective syndicates from all over the country. The Seido-kai was the only designated yakuza syndicate absent from this event.

The second president Namikawa has allegedly maintained a close relationship with Kunio Inoue. Inoue is the president of the fourth-generation Yamaken-gumi, an affiliate of the largest-known Yamaguchi-gumi syndicate.

== Activities ==
The Kyushu Seido-kai's illegal activities have allegedly included loansharking and methamphetamine trafficking. The Seido-kai was allegedly the largest drug trading division of the Dojin-kai, as rumored by some local Omuta in-the-know men, hence the informal dub name of the "Seido Pharmacy". Even the 55-year-old founding president Murakami was arrested for methamphetamine possession.

On June 11, 2013, Kyushu Seido-kai announced the end of its gang war with Dojin-kai as well as its dissolution.
