= Dojin-kai =

Yakuza group and drug cartel based in Kyushu

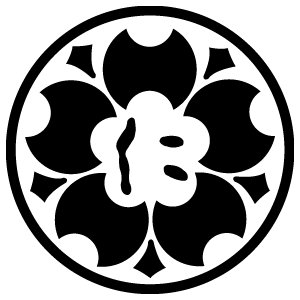
- Daimon of Dojin-kai
- Founding location: Kurume, Fukuoka, Japan
- Years active: Since 1971
- Membership (est.): 310
- Allies: Kudo-kai, Sinaloa cartel, Taishu-kai, Kumamoto-kai)
- Rivals: The Namikawa-kai and the Yamaguchi-gumi

The Dojin-kai (道仁会, Dōjin-kai) is a yakuza organization headquartered in Kurume, Fukuoka, on the Kyushu island of Japan, a designated yakuza syndicate, with approximately 310 members. As well as being known as a militant yakuza organization, the Dojin-kai has also been known as a de facto drug cartel, as its activities have allegedly included large-scale drug trafficking, specifically methamphetamine trafficking, which is traditionally shunned in the yakuza world.

With its activities of drug trafficking, the Dojin-kai has allegedly been Japan's largest wholesale dealer in drugs since the late 20th century, after the disbanding of three other yakuza groups based in northern Kyushu; Tagawa-based Sadaoka-gumi, known as Japan's Methlord in the Showa era, which was crushed by the Taishu-kai, Okawa-based Hamada-kai, and Kumamoto-based Yamano-kai.

== History ==
The Dojin-kai was formed in 1971 from four old yakuza groups united by the first president, Isoji Koga (former bakuto yakuza born 1934). Seijiro Matsuo, the Secretary General of the first-generation Dojin-kai, succeeded as the president in 1992. In the same year, 1992, the Dojin-kai was registered as a designated boryokudan group under the Organized Crime Countermeasures Law.

== Gangland vendetta ==
Very much like other yakuza groups based in the northern Kyushu region such as the Taishu-kai and Kudo-kai, the Dojin-kai has been noted for its aggressive and violent nature, causing numerous bloody conflicts with other yakuza groups. Notable ones include the Yama-Michi War (山道抗争, 1986–1987), where the organization substantially expelled the largest known Yamaguchi-gumi syndicate from the northern Kyushu area. Another notable one is a brief conflict that occurred in 1983, with the Kanto-based large yakuza syndicate Sumiyoshi Union, in which a majority of Dojin members moved to Tokyo and had been hiding out around Tokyo with the plan of slaying all of the Union's 76 senior bosses until the Union made a conceding offer of peaceful resolution (teuchi).

The Dojin-kai is noted for having been isolated in the yakuza world in an uncanny way, in contrast to most other yakuza organizations which usually have at least one ally (sakazuki-shared "brother" organization). In one notable anecdote, during the time of the Yama-Michi War, there were several offers of help from other organizations but the Dojin-kai reportedly rejected all of them. The Dojin-kai is a member of an anti-Yamaguchi fraternal federation, the Yonsha-kai, formed with three other northern-Kyushu based independent yakuza syndicates, the Kudo-kai, Taishu-kai and Kumamoto-kai. However even the Kudo-kai, the principal member, is said to have avoided getting deeply involved in the Dojin-kai.

The Dojin-kai again started a blatantly vicious conflict with its splinter group, Kyushu Seido-kai, in 2006.

=== War with the Seido-kai ===
When the long-time boss Seijiro Matsuo suddenly announced his resignation in May 2006, a war broke out between the headquarters and a splinter group in Omuta who, naming themselves the "Kyushu Seido-kai." They allegedly aligned themselves with the Yamaguchi-gumi, the Dojin-kai's rival and the largest yakuza syndicate in Japan. Seven people were killed during the beginning of the war. In one incident, a gangster walked into a hospital and shot an innocent man twice, mistaking him for a rival. In another, the Dojin-kai's headquarters was sprayed with an AK-47 assault rifle. More than five Dojin offices in Kurume and Fukuoka were attacked with bombs and firearms on May 21 of that year, and soon after that, on 24th, Seido-kai's Jinsei group headquarters office in Chikugo was totally destroyed, apparently by Dojin-kai's bombs.

On June 13, 2007, Zenji Tsurumaru was killed. On June 19, Hidenori Irie was killed. On August 18, the leader of Dojin-kai, Yoshihisa Onaka was killed. On November 8, a civilian Hiroshi Miyamoto was killed by mistake while receiving treatment at a hospital. On November 12, Shigeki Koga was killed. On November 27, Yoshikazu Matsuo, one of the chairmen, and his driver were killed. Both groups announced a cease-fire on December 18 and on February 5, 2008, the war reportedly ended.

The Fukuoka Prefectural Police discovered that the Seido-kai built a cenotaph in July 2009 in Omuta to pay tribute to their casualties. The names inscribed on its surface not only included those of Seido-kai members but also included those of Dojin-kai members. This cenotaph, however, disappeared by early 2011.

The Dojin-Seido war has been escalating since the late 2000s, especially in 2011, when they started using military machine guns and tossing grenades at each other. Many Seido members have escaped from Kyushu since the late 2000s, building an eight-story bulletproof building in Taito, Tokyo as their new base. The first Seido president, Chojiro Murakami, was arrested in Ibaraki Prefecture.

Kazuma Umeki, one of the top underbosses in the Seido-kai, was attacked with a 10-ton dump truck driven by a Dojin yakuza. In April 2011, two Seido seniors were shot with a revolver in Imari by a Dojin hitman, and Sueharu Matsunaga, the head of the Seido's Matsunaga group, was killed with a bomb.

== Activities ==
Sometimes informally and mockingly dubbed the "Dojin Pharmacy" (Dōjin Yakkyoku), the Dojin-kai's activities, the same as its splinter group Seido-kai's, allegedly largely consist of drug trafficking.

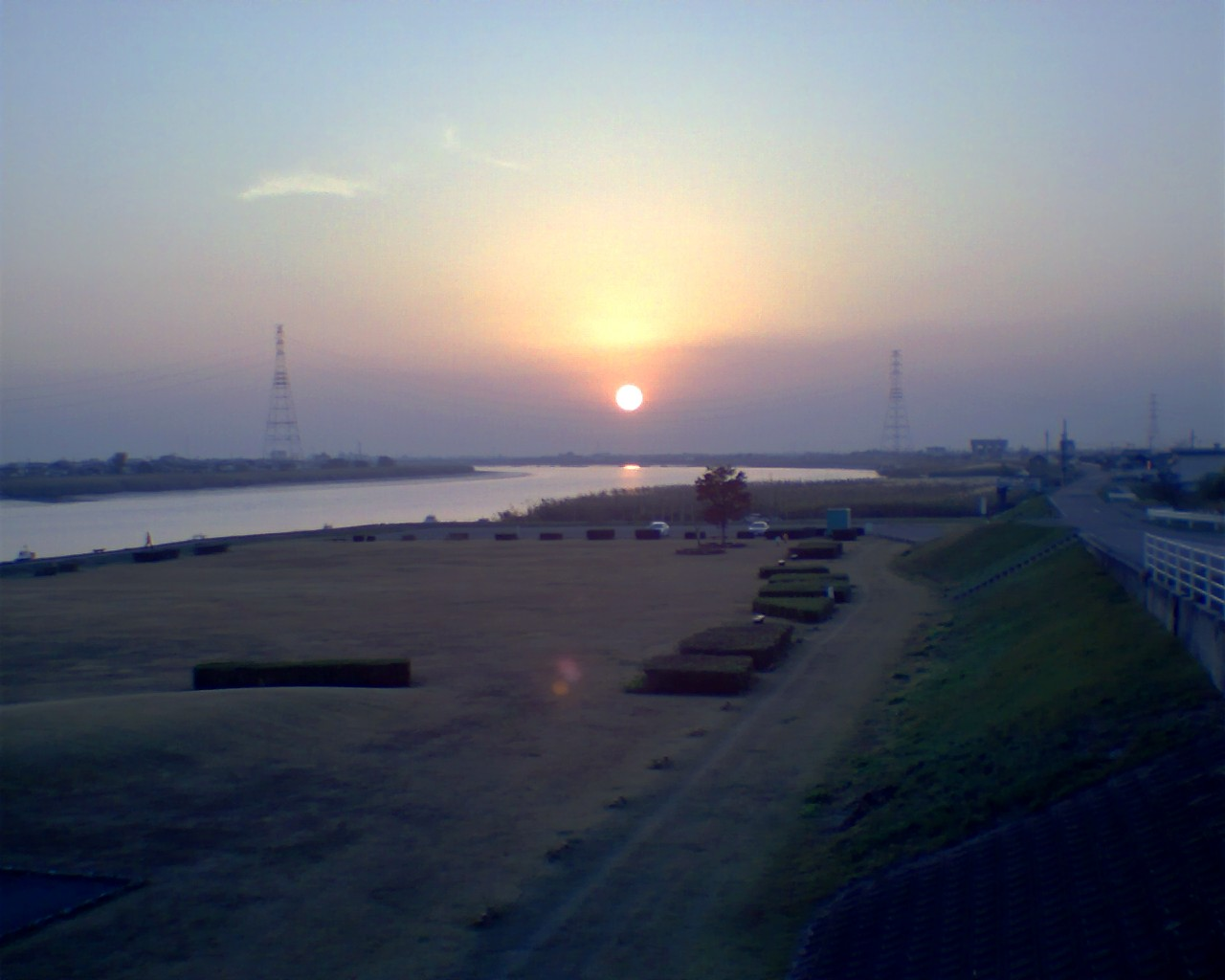
Primarily based in the Chikugo region of Fukuoka, the Dojin-kai has its known branch offices in three other prefectures.

=== Drug trafficking ===
In one notable case, as introduced in the "Drug Criminal Organization" section in the National Police Agency's 1991 Police White Paper, a Fukuoka-based 20-member small Dojin-affiliate had managed a systematic trafficking ring, selling methamphetamine to various drug-dealing yakuza organizations throughout the country. This group had also smuggled methamphetamine from Taiwan where it had a connection with a local Taiwanese drug ring. This group had used a small island located in Kagoshima Prefecture as a smuggling base. For example in 1986, this group smuggled approximately 570 kg (1,260 lb) of methamphetamine—estimated retail price of nearly US$1 billion—from Taiwan.

== Relationship with authorities ==
The Dojin-kai has been known for its strong anti-authority, anti-police stance since the 20th century, however at the same time the Dojin-kai has allegedly developed some relationship with local authorities. It has actually been uncovered, as, in the early 2000s, the Fukuoka Prefectural Police headquarters disclosed that its classified information had leaked out to the Dojin-kai via its branch police departments based in the Chikugo region including Kurume.

== Key persons ==
- Isoji Koga, the first president of the Dojin-kai

Koga was born on November 6, 1934, in Ogori, Fukuoka. In his boyhood, he was a leading member of an all-Japan youth judo champion team. He worked as a bank clerk in Kurume, Fukuoka for about two years, and after resigning from the bank, he entered the underworld as a bakuto probationer at the age of around 20. After retirement in 1992, Koga died at a hospital in Kurume on May 22, 2009. He was 74 years old. He was considered a historic godfather of the Dojin-kai.

- Seijiro Matsuo, the second president of the Dojin-kai. At that time during the Yama-Michi War, Koga was in prison, and Matsuo took command of the Dojin-kai to fight with the Yamaguchi-gumi.
