= Goda-ikka =

Yakuza group

Goda-ikku
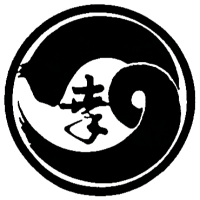
- The daimon of Goda-ikka
- Founder: Koichi Goda
- Founding location: Yamaguchi, Japan
- Membership: 30
- Leader(s): Makoto Suehiro

The Goda-ikka (合田一家, Gōda-ikka) is a yakuza group based in Yamaguchi, Japan. It is a designated yakuza group and Yamaguchi Prefecture's largest, with an estimated 30 members.

== History ==
The group was formed in 1948 as the Goda-gumi (合田組, Gōda-gumi) in Shimonoseki, Yamaguchi by Koichi Goda, then a member of an old yakuza clan, the Kagotora-gumi. The Goda-gumi was renamed the Goda-ikka in 1968. It was registered as a designated yakuza group under the Organized Crime Countermeasures Law in July 1992.

Kanji Nukui became its six-generation president in 1994. In October 2009, following his retirement, Makoto Suehiro became the seventh-generation president.

== Description ==
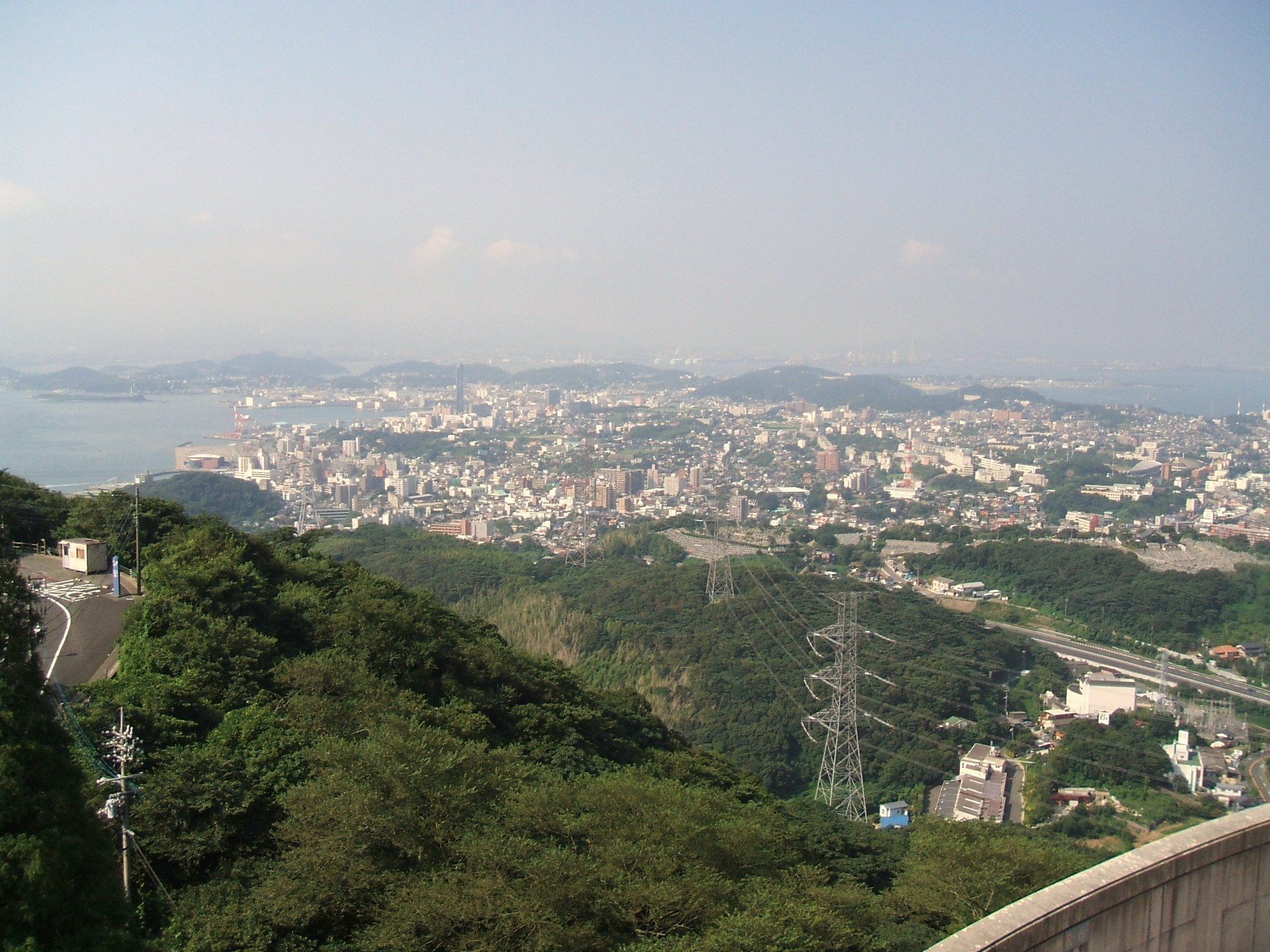
Shimonoseki

Based in Shimonoseki, Yamaguchi, the Goda-ikka has known offices in two other prefectures.

It is the largest yakuza group in Yamaguchi Prefecture, followed by the Yamaguchi-gumi. As of 2008, about 64% of yakuza members in Yamaguchi Prefecture belong to the Goda-ikka.

Since 1996, the Goda-ikka has been a member of an anti-Yamaguchi federation, the Gosha-kai, along with three other Chugoku-based organizations, the Kyosei-kai, the Kyodo-kai, the Asano-gumi, and the Shikoku-based Shinwa-kai.
