= Kyosei-kai =

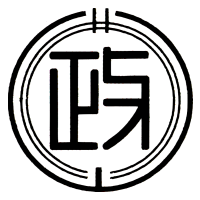
- The daimon of Kyosei-kai
- Founded: 1964; 61 years ago
- Founder: Tatsuo Yamamura
- Founding location: Hiroshima, Japan
- Membership: 120
- Leader(s): Susumu Arase

The Kyosei-kai (共政会, Kyōsei-kai) is a yakuza group based in Hiroshima, Japan.

== History ==
The Kyosei-kai was formed in May 1964 from seven yakuza clans united by bakuto Tatsuo Yamamura.

== Condition ==
The Kyosei-kai is known for its history of fierce conflicts with various other yakuza groups, and therefore, the Kyosei-kai is thought to be most responsible for creating Hiroshima's "town of violence" image. Notably the Kyosei-kai has been in conflict with the Yamaguchi-gumi, the largest yakuza syndicate, since the early 1960s.

The Kyosei-kai was a leading member of two anti-Yamaguchi federations, the Kansai Hatsuka-kai (formed in 1970) and the Nishinippon Hatsuka-kai (formed in 1989), and has formed a new anti-Yamaguchi federation named the Gosha-kai since 1996 with three other Chugoku-based organizations, the Kyodo-kai, the Asano-gumi, the Goda-ikka, and the Shikoku-based Shinwa-kai.

== In popular culture ==
The Battles Without Honor and Humanity yakuza film series is based on actual 20th-century yakuza conflicts engaged in by Hiroshima yakuza syndicates, particularly the events leading up to the formation of the Kyosei-kai.
