= Kokusui-kai =

The Kokusui-kai ("National Society") (國粹会), founded in 1958 by Masaji Morita, is a Tokyo-based yakuza organization with an estimated 1000 members. Originally a revivalist organization based on the 1919 monarchist anticommunist group of the same name established by statesman Tokonami Takejirō, it temporarily disbanded after country-wide yakuza crackdowns in 1965.

Despite its relatively low membership, it is widely viewed as a wealthy and successful gang, controlling Tokyo's fashionable Ginza district. Its oyabun, or godfather, was Kazuyoshi Kudo until his suicide in February 2007. The gang had long been a member of the Kantō Hatsukakai, a federation of Tokyo yakuza groups opposed to the powerful, Kansai-based Yamaguchi-gumi.

This changed in August 2005, when in a surprise move, the Kokusui-kai withdrew from the Kantō alliance and became an affiliate of the Yamaguchi-gumi. The timing of the change was particularly interesting: the Yamaguchi-gumi's new godfather, Kenichi Shinoda, had been installed just weeks before and had made clear his intent to expand into the Kantō region. The merger with the Kokusui-kai, in which Shinoda became sworn brothers with Kazuyoshi Kudo in a sake-sharing ritual, was concrete evidence of the Yamaguchi's expansion.

== See also ==
- National essentialism (国粋主義)
