= Kyokuto-kai =

Japanese criminal organisation

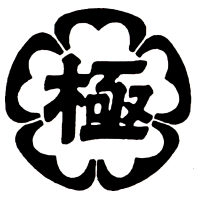
- The daimon of Kyokuto-kai
- Founder: Aiji Sekiguchi
- Founding location: Tokyo, Japan
- Membership: 300
- Leader: Jin Takahashi

The Kyokuto-kai (極東会, Kyokutō-kai) is a yakuza organization based in Tokyo, Japan.

== History ==
The Kyokuto-kai was registered as a designated yakuza group under the Organized Crime Countermeasures Law in July 1993.

== Condition ==
In the early 2000s, the Kyokuto-kai was involved in a feud with the rival Matsuba-kai, which led to a number of shootings.
