= Asano-gumi =

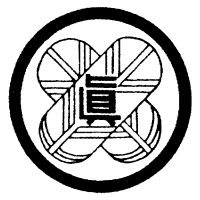
- The daimon of Asano-gumi
- Founded: 1955; 70 years ago
- Founder: Shin'ichi Asano
- Founding location: Okayama, Japan
- Membership: 40
- Leader(s): Yutaka Hiraoka

The Asano-gumi (浅野組) is a yakuza group based in Okayama, Japan. The Asano-gumi is a designated yakuza group.

== History ==
The Asano-gumi was formed in 1945 as a bakuto organization named the Oyama-ikka (大山一家, Ōyama-ikka) by Kunio Oyama. The group restarted as the Asano-gumi with the head of Shin'ichi Asano in April 1952 following Oyama's retirement. Yoshiaki Kushida succeeded as president in September 1983.

== Condition ==
The Asano-gumi has been based in Kasaoka, Okayama ever since its formation.

The Asano-gumi caused conflicts with the Yamaguchi-gumi and the Kyodo-kai in the late 20th century. In one notable case, Asano member(s) shot and murdered two Yamaguchi members in Kurashiki in 1987, as a retaliation for an earlier attack by Yamaguchi member(s) involving carving knives against two Asano members.

Since 1996, the Asano-gumi has been a member of an anti-Yamaguchi federation named the Gosha-kai, along with three other Chugoku-based organizations, the Kyosei-kai, the Kyodo-kai, the Goda-ikka, and the Shikoku-based Shinwa-kai.
