= Azuma-gumi =

Yakuza organization based in Osaka

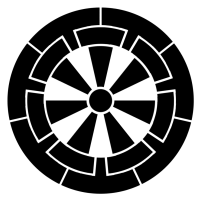
Daimon of Azuma-gumi

The Azuma-gumi (東組) is a yakuza organization based in Osaka, Japan. The Azuma-gumi is a designated yakuza group with an estimated 50 active members.

== History ==
The Azuma-gumi was registered as a designated yakuza group under the Organized Crime Countermeasures Law in August 1993.

== Condition ==
The Azuma-gumi is one of the two designated yakuza groups based in the Osaka Prefecture, along with the Sakaume-gumi, and maintains its headquarters office in Nishinari, Osaka.

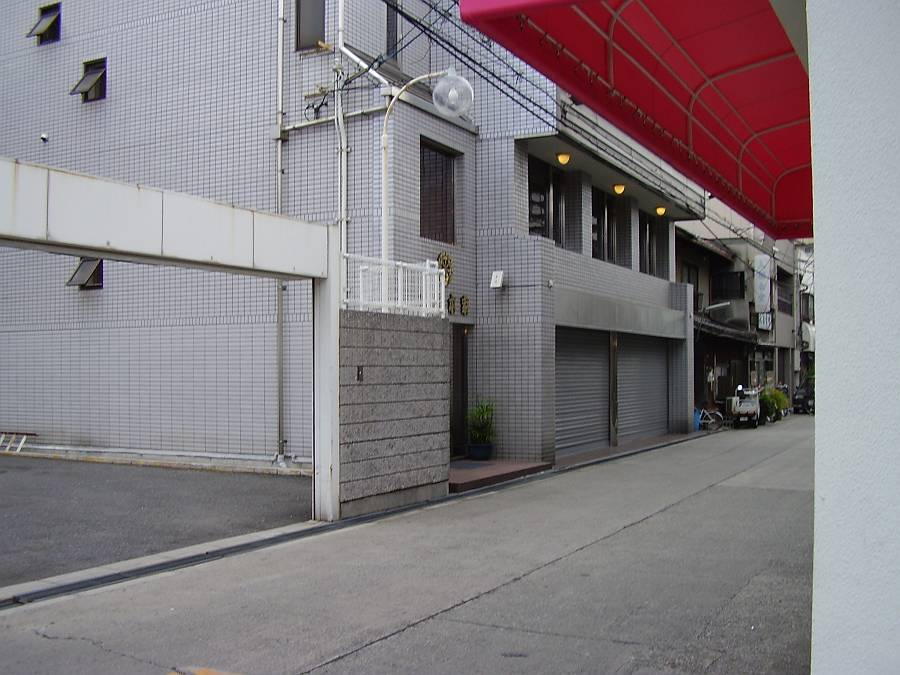
Azuma-gumi Nishinari office
