= Sakaume-gumi =

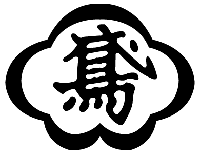
- The daimon of Sakaume-gumi
- Founder: Umekichi Tobi
- Founding location: Osaka, Japan
- Membership: 10
- Leader(s): Masahide Kinoshita

The Sakaume-gumi (酒梅組) is a yakuza organization based in Osaka, Japan.

The Sakaume-gumi is an old-established, small group that focuses primarily on gambling, and not on other activities like extortion and drugs. Perhaps because of this, it has had relatively good relations with the local police.

When Japan passed new anti-boryokudan laws in 1992, the Sakaume-gumi was one of the few Kansai-based groups not to launch legal challenges against the new legislation. At a hearing, the group's representative stated, "If the Sakaume-gumi fulfills conditions for designation (as a boryokudan group), we have no choice but to accept it."

== History ==
The Sakaume-gumi was registered as a designated yakuza group under the Organized Crime Countermeasures Law in May 1993.

== Condition ==
The Sakaume-gumi is one of the two designated yakuza groups based in the Osaka Prefecture, along with the Azuma-gumi, and maintains its headquarters office in Nishinari, Osaka.

One former member of the Sakaume-gumi has achieved a measure of fame in another field: born-again Christianity. Rev Hiroyuki Suzuki, a tattooed, pinky-missing former Sakaume-gumi gangster, has become an evangelical Christian preacher.
