= Kyodo-kai =

Yakuza group in Hiroshima, Japan

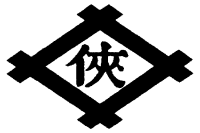
Daimon of Kyodo-kai

The Kyodo-kai (侠道会, Kyōdō-kai) is a yakuza group based in Hiroshima, Japan. The Kyodo-kai is a designated yakuza group with an estimated 60 active members. and is the second largest yakuza group in the Chugoku region after the Kyosei-kai.

== History ==
The Kyodo-kai was formed immediately after the World War II as a bakuto organization named the Takahashi-gumi (高橋組) in Onomichi, Hiroshima by Tokujiro Takahashi. Kokichi Morita, then the highest-ranked senior member of the Takahashi-gumi, formed the Kyodo-kai in January 1969 following the Takahashi-gumi's disbanding. Kokichi Morita's younger brother Kazuo Morita succeeded as president in November 1989. The Kyodo-kai was registered as a designated yakuza group under the Organized Crime Countermeasures Law in 1993.

== Condition ==
Based in Onomichi, Hiroshima, the Kyodo-kai has its known offices in five other prefectures including Okayama and Kagawa.

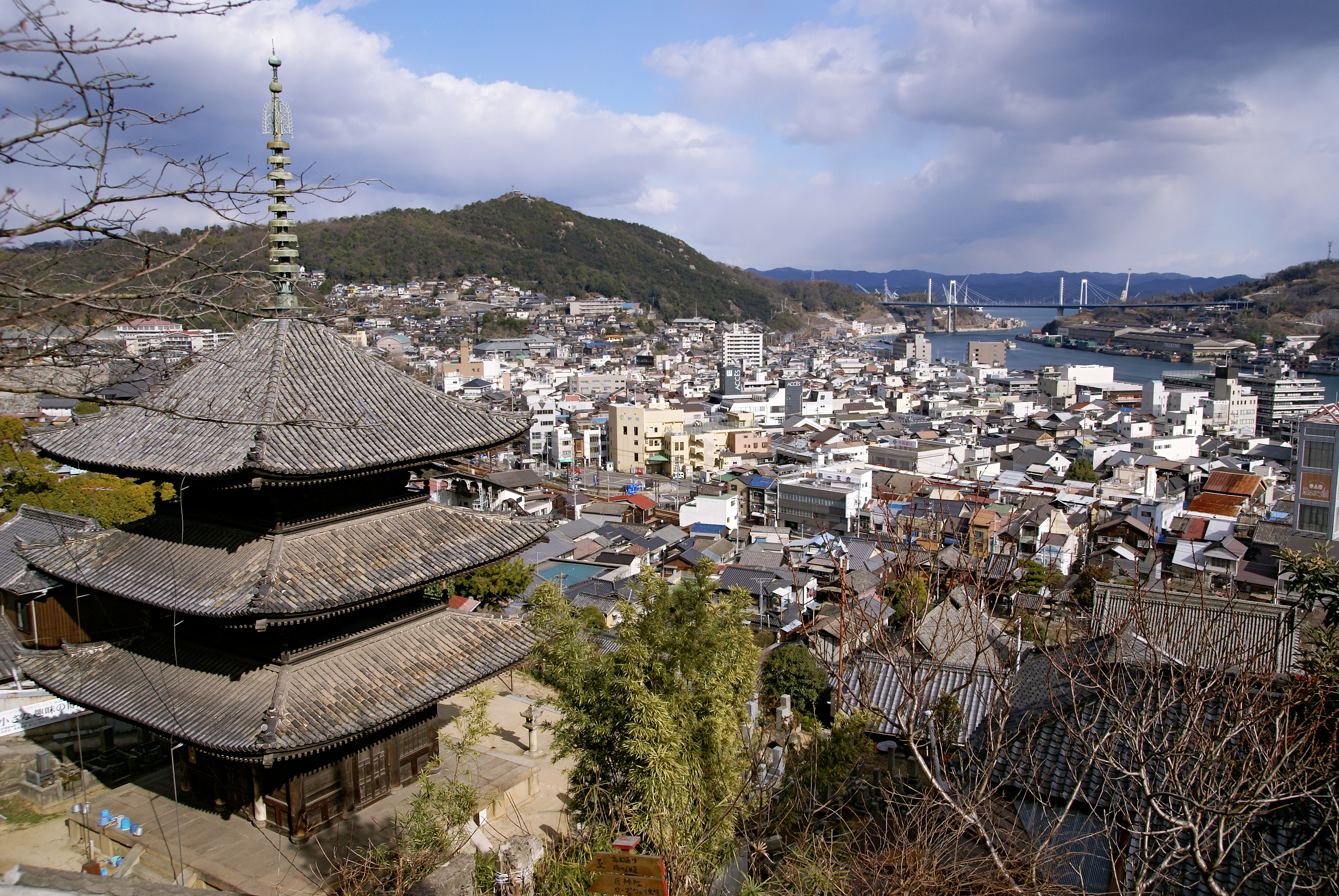
Onomichi

Since 1996, the Kyodo-kai has been a member of an anti-Yamaguchi federation named the Gosha-kai, along with three other Chugoku-based organizations, the Kyosei-kai, the Asano-gumi, the Goda-ikka, and the Shikoku-based Shinwa-kai.

== Involvement in Politics ==
The founder Tokujiro Takahashi was also a politician. He was elected to Onomichi City Council in April 1951 and allegedly later became Onomichi's most influential figure. He was eventually elected to Hiroshima Prefectural Council in December 1955, and had been a member of the council until December 1967 when he was arrested for illegal baseball-gambling.
