= Yamano-kai =

The Third Yamano-kai (山野会, Sandaime Yamano-kai) was a yakuza group based in Kumamoto, Kyushu, Japan. It was a secondary organization of the Kumamoto-rengo (熊本連合).

== History ==
Founded by Yoshiaki Yamano in 1954 under the name "Shinsen-gumi" (新選組), it changed its name to "Yamano-kai" in 1956. Masatoshi Minoda succeeded as its president in 1972, and Tetsuo Ikeda became the president in 1986.

The group dissolved in April 2001. However, many of its members formed a new group, the Sanshin-kai, in September of that year.

The Yamano-kai was designated by the Japanese police as a bōryokudan group from December 1992 to November 2001.

== Successive presidents ==
- 1st: Yoshiaki Yamano (山野 義明)
- 2nd: Masatoshi Minoda (蓑田 正敏)
- 3rd: Tetsuo Ikeda (池田 鉄雄)
