= Sumiyoshi-kai =

Yakuza group based in Tokyo

- The daimon of the Sumiyoshi-kai
- Founded: 1958; 68 years ago
- Founder: Jusaku Abe
- Founding location: Tokyo, Japan
- Territory: Tokyo
- Membership: 2,100 members 1,100 quasi-members
- Leader: Shūji Ogawa

The Sumiyoshi-kai (住吉会), sometimes referred to as the Sumiyoshi-rengo (住吉連合, Sumiyoshi-rengō; "Sumiyoshi Union"), is the second-largest yakuza group in Japan with an estimated 2,100 members.

== Outline ==
Their territories mainly consist of upscale districts such as Kabukichō and Ginza. Shops operating in these territories are often part of protection rackets in which they must pay a fee called a mikajime-ryō (みかじめ料). The Sumiyoshi-kai is a confederation of smaller gangs. Structurally, the Sumiyoshi-kai differs from its main rival, the Yamaguchi-gumi. The Sumiyoshi-kai, as a federation, has a looser chain of command and while there is a chairman, some power is delegated to affiliate clan leaders.

The group has a complex history, with numerous name changes along the way. It was founded in 1958 as the Minato-kai (港会) by Jusaku Abe who was the 3rd sōchō (総長; "Supreme Leader") of the Sumiyoshi-ikka. Yoshimitsu Sekigami, who was the 4th sōchō of Sumiyoshi-ikka, renamed it to Sumiyoshi-kai. It was dissolved in 1965.

In 1969, the group was rebuilt as a union, the Sumiyoshi-rengo, by Masao Hori, who was the 5th sōchō of Sumiyoshi-ikka. He remade it as the Sumiyoshi-rengokai (住吉連合会) in 1982, and Hori became kaicho (president). Chief Director Ryoji Kawaguchi assumed the role of kaicho, and Hori was promoted to sosai, or chairman, in 1988. Kawaguchi died of illness in May 1990, and Hori died of illness in October of the same year.

Shigeo Nishiguchi, born in 1929, became the 6th sōchō of Sumiyoshi-ikka and kaicho of this group in February, 1991. At that time, it was again renamed the Sumiyoshi-kai. Chief Director Hareaki Fukuda, born in 1943, became kaicho, and Nishiguchi was promoted to sosai in June 1998. Fukuda became the 7th sōchō of the Sumiyoshi-ikka on April 17, 2005.

On 19 April 2003, Takao Nishida, head of the affiliated Nishida-gumi, was gunned down in Ōizumi, Gunma. Police stated that they were probing for possible links between the murder and a series of shootings between the Sumiyoshi-kai and the Yamaguchi-gumi in neighboring Tochigi Prefecture.

On the morning of Monday, 5 January 2007, boss Ryoichi Sugiura was shot in his car in Tokyo. Within hours the offices of the Yamaguchi-gumi were fired upon in retribution. The following month, 70-year-old Kazuyoshi Kudo, head of the Kokusui-kai, was discovered dead in his home in Tokyo, police said. A gun was found by his side and police suspected suicide, raising tensions between the Sumiyoshi-kai and the Yamaguchi-gumi.

In September of 2017, Sumiyoshi-kai sosai, or chairman, Shigeo Nishiguchi died of natural causes at the age of 88.

In April 2020, a report from the National Police Agency shows that the total number of members of organized crime gangs fell to historical lows, having just 2,800 members and 1,700 associated members.

On May 31, 2022, Isao Seki, the eighth leader of the Sumiyoshi-kai, died at the age of 76. Shūji Ogawa, who holds the position of kaicho, was the leader of the Sumiyoshi-kai at the time of Isao Seki's funeral.
