= List of Osaka Metro stations =

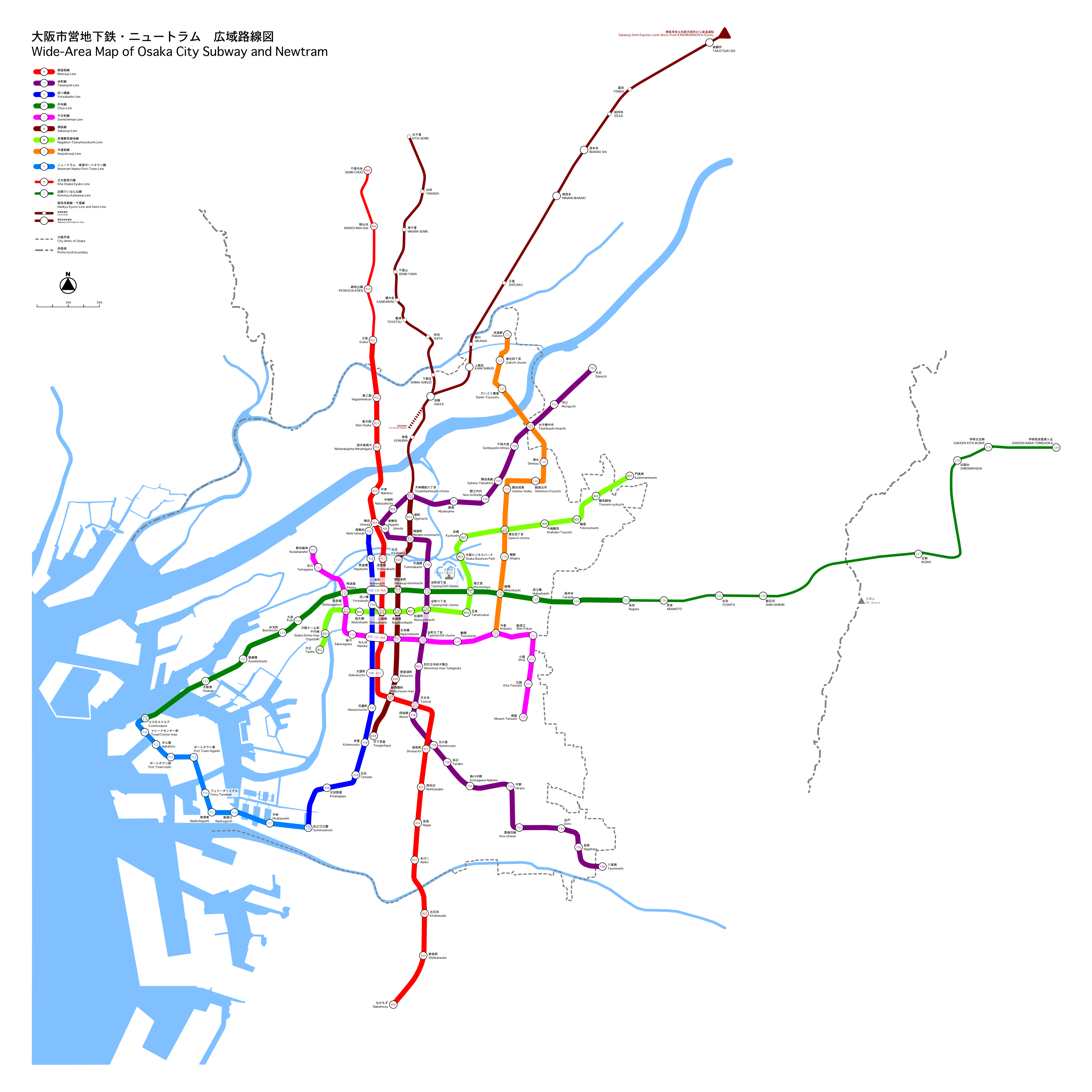
Map of Osaka Metro

List of Osaka Metro stations lists all of the stations in the Osaka Metro and includes the station's name, picture, metro lines serving that station, location (ward or city), design, and daily usage. The Osaka Metro consists of eight subway lines and one automated people mover, with a total of 133 stations (108 stations counting interchange stations, served by multiple lines, only once). The system mainly serves the city of Osaka, as well as Higashiosaka, Kadoma, Moriguchi, Sakai, Suita, and Yao.

== Overview ==
The first section of the Osaka Metro (formerly known as the Osaka Municipal Subway) opened on May 20, 1933, between Umeda Station and Shinsaibashi Station on the Midosuji Line. The line was 138.7 km long.

The reported daily usage is the total of boarding and alighting passengers at each station from a ridership survey conducted on Tuesday, 14 November 2017. With respect to "interface" station for through services, only subway ridership are included. Osaka Metro considers Shinsaibashi Station and Yotsubashi Station to be the same station for the daily usage figures.

== Stations ==
‡	Official transfer stations
†	Terminals
†‡	Transfer station and terminal
*	Through train service available

Station	Japanese	Photo	Lines	Opened	Design	Ward or City	Usage (FY2017)
Abeno	あべの	Abeno Station	Tanimachi Line	27 Nov 1980	Underground	Abeno	17,835
Abiko	あびこ	Abiko Station	Midōsuji Line	1 Jul 1960	Underground	Sumiyoshi	34,661
Asashiobashi	朝潮橋	Asashiobashi Station	Chūō Line	11 Dec 1961	Elevated	Minato	20,646
Awaza ‡	阿波座	Awaza Station	Chūō Line; Sennichimae Line	31 Oct 1964	Underground	Nishi	47,915
Bentenchō	弁天町	Bentenchō Station	Chūō Line	11 Dec 1961	Elevated	Minato	37,662
Cosmosquare ‡	コスモスクエア	Cosmosquare Station	Chūō Line; Nankō Port Town Line	18 Dec 1997	Underground	Suminoe	22,576
Daidō-Toyosato	だいどう豊里	Daidō-Toyosato Station	Imazatosuji Line	24 Dec 2006	Underground	Higashiyodogawa	9,815
Daikokuchō ‡	大国町	Daikokuchō Station	Midōsuji Line; Yotsubashi Line	21 Apr 1938	Underground	Naniwa	32,104
Dainichi †	大日	Dainichi Station	Tanimachi Line	8 Feb 1983	Underground	Moriguchi	31,865
Deto	出戸	Deto Station	Tanimachi Line	27 Nov 1980	Underground	Hirano	15,193
Dōbutsuen-mae ‡	動物園前	Dōbutsuen-mae Station	Midōsuji Line; Sakaisuji Line	21 Apr 1938	Underground	Nishinari	29,282
Dome-mae Chiyozaki	ドーム前千代崎	Dome-mae Chiyozaki Station	Nagahori Tsurumi-ryokuchi Line	29 Aug 1997	Underground	Nishi	11,878
Ebisuchō	恵美須町	Ebisuchō Station	Sakaisuji Line	6 Dec 1969	Underground	Naniwa	20,879
Esaka †*	江坂	Esaka Station	Midōsuji Line (Kita-Osaka Kyuko Railway)	24 Feb 1970	Elevated	Suita	84,887
Ferry Terminal	フェリーターミナル	Ferry Terminal Station	Nankō Port Town Line	16 Mar 1981	Elevated	Suminoe	3,552
Fukaebashi	深江橋	Fukaebashi Station	Chūō Line	29 Jul 1968	Underground	Higashinari	23,150
Fuminosato	文の里	Fuminosato Station	Tanimachi Line	27 Nov 1980	Underground	Abeno	11,354
Gamō-yonchōme ‡	蒲生四丁目	Gamō-yonchōme Station	Nagahori Tsurumi-ryokuchi Line; Imazatosuji Line	20 Mar 1990	Underground	Jōtō	18,261
Hanazonochō	花園町	Hanazonochō Station	Yotsubashi Line	10 May 1942	Underground	Nishinari	15,652
Higashi-Mikuni	東三国	Higashi-Mikuni Station	Midōsuji Line	24 Feb 1970	Elevated	Yodogawa	36,744
Higashi-Umeda ‡	東梅田	Higashi-Umeda Station	Tanimachi Line; Midōsuji Line via Umeda; Yotsubashi Line via Nishi-Umeda	24 Mar 1967	Underground	Kita	168,539
Higobashi	肥後橋	Higobashi Station	Yotsubashi Line	1 Oct 1965	Underground	Nishi	74,113
Hirabayashi	平林	Hirabayashi Station	Nankō Port Town Line	16 Mar 1981	Elevated	Suminoe	5,247
Hirano	平野	Hirano Station	Tanimachi Line	27 Nov 1980	Underground	Hirano	22,012
Hommachi ‡	本町	Hommachi Station	Midōsuji Line; Chūō Line; Yotsubashi Line	20 May 1933	Underground	Chūō	217,449
Imafuku-Tsurumi	今福鶴見	Imafuku-Tsurumi Station	Nagahori Tsurumi-ryokuchi Line	20 Mar 1990	Underground	Jōtō; Tsurumi	23,168
Imazato †‡	今里	Imazato Station	Sennichimae Line; Imazatosuji Line	25 Jul 1969	Underground	Higashinari	22,284
Itakano †	井高野	Itakano Station	Imazatosuji Line	24 Dec 2006	Underground	Higashiyodogawa	7,131
Kadoma-minami †	門真南	Kadoma-minami Station	Nagahori Tsurumi-ryokuchi Line	29 Oct 1997	Underground	Kadoma	11,113
Kire-Uriwari	喜連瓜破	Kire-Uriwari Station	Tanimachi Line	27 Nov 1980	Underground	Hirano	21,823
Kishinosato	岸里	Kishinosato Station	Yotsubashi Line	1 Jun 1956	Underground	Nishinari	16,188
Kitahama	北浜	Kitahama Station	Sakaisuji Line	6 Dec 1969	Underground	Chūō	70,719
Kitahanada	北花田	Kitahanada Station	Midōsuji Line	18 Apr 1987	Underground	Sakai	24,113
Kitakagaya	北加賀屋	Kitakagaya Station	Yotsubashi Line	9 Nov 1972	Underground	Suminoe	24,659
Kita-Tatsumi	北巽	Kita-Tatsumi Station	Sennichimae Line	2 Dec 1981	Underground	Ikuno	13,589
Komagawa-Nakano	駒川中野	Komagawa-Nakano Station	Tanimachi Line	27 Nov 1980	Underground	Higashisumiyoshi	17,037
Kujō	九条	Kujō Station	Chūō Line	31 Oct 1964	Elevated	Nishi	22,887
Kyōbashi	京橋	Kyōbashi Station	Nagahori Tsurumi-ryokuchi Line	20 Mar 1990	Underground	Miyakojima	36,744
Matsuyamachi	松屋町	Matsuyamachi Station	Nagahori Tsurumi-ryokuchi Line	11 Dec 1996	Underground	Chūō	11,162
Midoribashi ‡	緑橋	Midoribashi Station	Chūō Line; Imazatosuji Line	29 Jul 1968	Underground	Higashinari	21,982
Minami-morimachi ‡	南森町	Minami-morimachi Station	Tanimachi Line; Sakaisuji Line	24 Mar 1967	Underground	Kita	84,394
Minami-Tatsumi	南巽	Minami-Tatsumi Station	Sennichimae Line	2 Dec 1981	Underground	Ikuno	11,783
Miyakojima	都島	Miyakojima Station	Tanimachi Line	29 May 1974	Underground	Miyakojima	36,064
Moriguchi	守口	Moriguchi Station	Tanimachi Line	6 Apr 1977	Underground	Moriguchi	17,147
Morinomiya ‡	森ノ宮	Morinomiya Station	Chūō Line; Nagahori Tsurumi-ryokuchi Line	30 Sep 1967	Underground	Chūō	32,186
Nagahara	長原	Nagahara Station	Tanimachi Line	27 Nov 1980	Underground	Hirano-ku, Osaka	10,980
Nagahoribashi ‡	長堀橋	Nagahoribashi Station	Sennichimae Line; Nagahori Tsurumi-ryokuchi Line	6 Dec 1969	Underground	Chūō	52,824
Nagai	長居	Nagai Station	Midōsuji Line	1 Jul 1960	Underground	Sumiyoshi	31,375
Nagata †*	長田	Nagata Station	Chūō Line (Kintetsu Keihanna Line)	5 Apr 1985	Underground	Higashiōsaka	19,425
Nakafuto	中ふ頭	Nakafuto Station	Nankō Port Town Line	16 Mar 1981	Elevated	Suminoe	6,958
Nakamozu †	なかもず	Nakamozu Station	Midōsuji Line	18 Apr 1987	Underground	Sakai	74,041
Nakatsu	中津	Nakatsu Station	Midōsuji Line	24 Sep 1964	Underground	Kita	40,410
Nakazakichō	中崎町	Nakazakichō Station	Tanimachi Line	29 May 1974	Underground	Kita	14,523
Namba ‡	難波	Namba Station	Midōsuji Line; Yotsubashi Line; Sennichimae Line	30 Oct 1935	Underground	Chūō	352,890
Nankōguchi	南港口	Nankōguchi Station	Nankō Port Town Line	16 Mar 1981	Elevated	Suminoe	4,778
Nankō-higashi	南港東	Nankō-higashi Station	Nankō Port Town Line	16 Mar 1981	Elevated	Suminoe	4,483
Nippombashi ‡	日本橋	Nippombashi Station	Sakaisuji Line; Sennichimae Line	6 Dec 1969	Underground	Chūō	77,212
Nishi-Nagahori ‡	西長堀	Nishi-Nagahori Station	Sennichimae Line; Nagahori Tsurumi-ryokuchi Line	16 Apr 1969	Underground	Nishi	27,132
Nishinakajima-Minamigata	西中島南方	Nishinakajima-Minamigata Station	Midōsuji Line	24 Sep 1964	Elevated	Yodogawa	65,058
Nishiōhashi	西大橋	Nishiōhashi Station	Nagahori Tsurumi-ryokuchi Line	29 Aug 1997	Underground	Nishi	14,744
Nishitanabe	西田辺	Nishitanabe Station	Midōsuji Line	5 Oct 1952	Underground	Abeno	22,631
Nishi-Umeda †‡	西梅田	Nishi-Umeda Station	Yotsubashi Line	1 Oct 1965	Underground	Kita	115,945
Nodahanshin †	野田阪神	Nodahanshin Station	Sennichimae Line	16 Apr 1969	Underground	Fukushima	25,846
Noe-Uchindai	野江内代	Noe-Uchindai Station	Tanimachi Line	6 Apr 1977	Underground	Miyakojima	11,508
Ogimachi	扇町	Ogimachi Station	Sakaisuji Line	6 Dec 1969	Underground	Kita	16,105
Osaka Business Park	大阪ビジネスパーク	Osaka Business Park Station	Nagahori Tsurumi-ryokuchi Line	11 Dec 1996	Underground	Chūō	13,268
Ōsakakō	大阪港	Ōsakakō Station	Chūō Line	11 Dec 1961	Elevated	Minato	22,637
Port Town-higashi	ポートタウン東	Port Town-higashi Station	Nankō Port Town Line	16 Mar 1981	Elevated	Suminoe	13,278
Port Town-nishi	ポートタウン西	Port Town-nishi Station	Nankō Port Town Line	16 Mar 1981	Elevated	Suminoe	8,468
Sakaisuji-Hommachi ‡	堺筋本町	Sakaisuji-Hommachi Station	Chūō Line; Sakaisuji Line	6 Dec 1969	Underground	Chūō	112,306
Sakuragawa	桜川	Sakuragawa Station	Sennichimae Line	16 Apr 1969	Underground	Naniwa	16,856
Sekime-Seiiku	関目成育	Sekime-Seiiku Station	Imazatosuji Line	24 Dec 2006	Underground	Jōtō	6,864
Sekime-Takadono	関目高殿	Sekime-Takadono Station	Tanimachi Line	6 Apr 1977	Underground	Asahi	15,380
Sembayashi-Omiya	千林大宮	Sembayashi-Omiya Station	Tanimachi Line	6 Apr 1977	Underground	Asahi	16,453
Shigino	鴫野	Shigino Station	Imazatosuji Line	24 Dec 2006	Underground	Jōtō	9,661
Shimizu	清水	Shimizu Station	Imazatosuji Line	24 Dec 2006	Underground	Asahi	5,815
Shimmori-Furuichi	新森古市	Shimmori-Furuichi Station	Imazatosuji Line	24 Dec 2006	Underground	Asahi	7,571
Shin-Fukae	新深江	Shin-Fukae Station	Sennichimae Line	10 Sep 1969	Underground	Higashinari	12,638
Shinkanaoka	新金岡	Shinkanaoka Station	Midōsuji Line	18 Apr 1987	Underground	Sakai	21,253
Shin-Ōsaka	新大阪	Shin-Ōsaka Station	Midōsuji Line	24 Sep 1964	Elevated	Yodogawa	148,472
Shinsaibashi ‡ Yotsubashi ‡	心斎橋 / 四ツ橋	Shinsaibashi Station Yotsubashi Station	Midōsuji Line; Nagahori Tsurumi-ryokuchi Line; Yotsubashi Line	20 May 1933; 1 Oct 1965	Underground	Chūō	180,183
Shitennōji-mae Yūhigaoka	四天王寺前夕陽ケ丘	Shitennōji-mae Yūhigaoka Station	Tanimachi Line	17 Dec 1968	Underground	Tennōji	25,303
Shōji	小路	Shōji Station	Sennichimae Line	2 Dec 1981	Underground	Ikuno	8,399
Shōwachō	昭和町	Shōwachō Station	Midōsuji Line	20 Dec 1951	Underground	Abeno	25,222
Suminoekōen †‡	住之江公園	Suminoekōen Station	Yotsubashi Line; Nankō Port Town Line	9 Nov 1972	Underground; Elevated	Suminoe	30,866
Taishibashi-Imaichi ‡	太子橋今市	Taishibashi-Imaichi Station	Tanimachi Line; Imazatosuji Line	6 Apr 1977	Underground	Asahi; Moriguchi	13,497
Taishō †	大正	Taishō Station	Nagahori Tsurumi-ryokuchi Line	29 Aug 1997	Underground	Taishō	11,806
Takaida	高井田	Takaida Station	Chūō Line	5 Apr 1985	Underground	Higashiōsaka	16,352
Tamade	玉出	Tamade Station	Yotsubashi Line	31 May 1956	Underground	Nishinari	19,877
Tamagawa	玉川	Tamagawa Station	Sennichimae Line	16 Apr 1969	Underground	Fukushima	10,421
Tamatsukuri	玉造	Tamatsukuri Station	Nagahori Tsurumi-ryokuchi Line	11 Dec 1996	Underground	Tennōji	14,969
Tanabe	田辺	Tanabe Station	Tanimachi Line	27 Nov 1980	Underground	Higashisumiyoshi	9,198
Tanimachi Kyūchōme ‡	谷町九丁目	Tanimachi Kyūchōme Station	Tanimachi Line; Sennichimae Line	17 Dec 1968	Underground	Tennōji	74,850
Tanimachi Rokuchōme ‡	谷町六丁目	Tanimachi Rokuchōme Station	Tanimachi Line; Nagahori Tsurumi-ryokuchi Line	17 Dec 1968	Underground	Chūō	34,831
Tanimachi Yonchōme ‡	谷町四丁目	Tanimachi Yonchōme Station	Tanimachi Line; Chūō Line	24 Mar 1967	Underground	Chūō	93,358
Temmabashi	天満橋	Temmabashi Station	Tanimachi Line	24 Mar 1967	Underground	Chūō	90,841
Tengachaya †	天下茶屋	Tengachaya Station	Sakaisuji Line	4 Mar 1993	Underground	Nishinari	71,617
Tenjimbashisuji Rokuchōme †‡*	天神橋筋六丁目	Tenjimbashisuji Rokuchōme Station	Sakaisuji Line (Hankyu Senri Line); Tanimachi Line	6 Dec 1969	Underground	Kita	39,366
Tennōji ‡	天王寺	Tennōji Station	Midōsuji Line; Tanimachi Line	21 Apr 1938	Underground	Tennōji; Abeno	269,620
Trade Center-mae	トレードセンター前	Trade Center-mae Station	Nankō Port Town Line	18 Dec 1997	Elevated	Suminoe	13,907
Tsuruhashi	鶴橋	Tsuruhashi Station	Sennichimae Line	25 Jul 1969	Underground	Tennōji	29,014
Tsurumi-ryokuchi	鶴見緑地	Tsurumi-ryokuchi Station	Nagahori Tsurumi-ryokuchi Line	20 Mar 1990	Underground	Tsurumi	9,951
Umeda ‡	梅田	Umeda Station	Midōsuji Line; Yotsubashi Line via Nishi-Umeda; Tanimachi Line via Higashi-Umeda	20 May 1933	Underground	Kita	438,763
Yaominami †	八尾南	Yaominami Station	Tanimachi Line	27 Nov 1980	At-grade	Yao	11,297
Yodoyabashi	淀屋橋	Yodoyabashi Station	Midōsuji Line	20 May 1933	Elevated	Chūō	228,722
Yokozutsumi	横堤	Yokozutsumi Station	Nagahori Tsurumi-ryokuchi Line	20 Mar 1990	Underground	Tsurumi	18,089
Yumeshima †	夢洲	Yumeshima Station	Chūō Line	19 Jan 2025	Underground	Konohana	
Zuikō Yonchōme	瑞光四丁目	Zuikō Yonchōme Station	Imazatosuji Line	24 Dec 2006	Underground	Higashiyodogawa	9,670
