= Nankō-higashi Station =

Metro station in Osaka, Japan

Coordinates: 34°36′50″N 135°26′19″E

Nankō-higashi Station 南港東駅
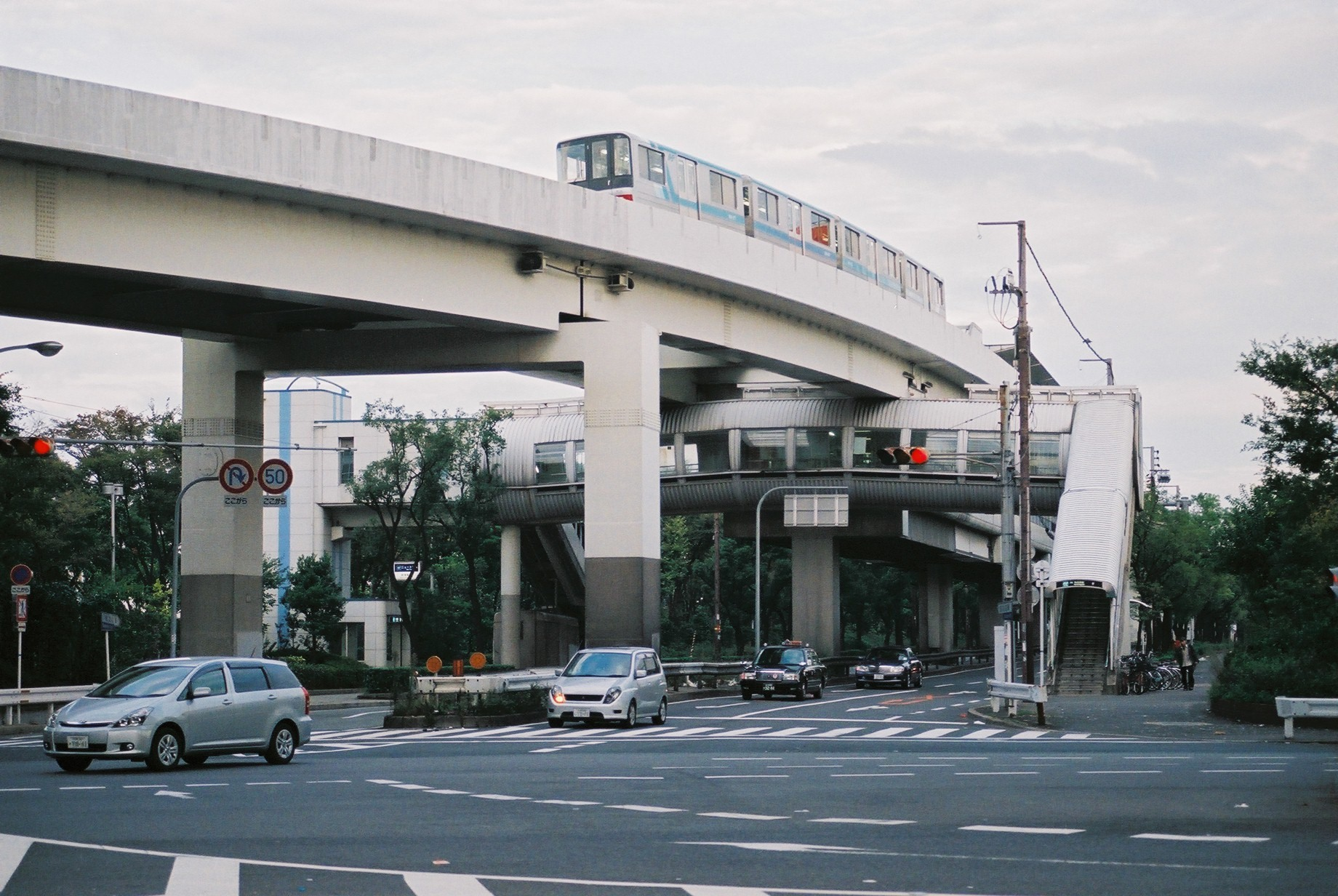
- Nanko East Station entrance passage

General information
- Location: 2-4-52 Nankohigashi; Suminoe Ward, Osaka; Japan
- System: Osaka Metro
- Operator: Osaka Metro
- Line: Nankō Port Town Line
- Platforms: 1 island platform
- Tracks: 2

Construction
- Structure type: Elevated

Other information
- Station code: P 15

History
- Opened: 16 March 1981; 45 years ago

Services
Preceding station	Osaka Metro	Following station
Ferry Terminal P 14 towards Cosmosquare	Nankō Port Town Line	Nankōguchi P 16 towards Suminoekōen
Location
- Location within Osaka Prefecture Location within Japan

Nankō-higashi Station (南港東駅, Nankō-higashi-eki; station number: P15) is a train station on the Nankō Port Town Line (New Tram) in Suminoe-ku, Osaka, Japan.

== Layout ==
- There is an elevated island platform with two tracks. The station is completely walled in with glass walls.

1	■ Nankō Port Town Line	for Suminoekōen
2	■ Nankō Port Town Line	for Nakafuto and Cosmosquare
