= Ferry Terminal Station =

Metro station in Osaka, Japan

Coordinates: 34°37′9.27″N 135°26′5.58″E

Ferry Terminal Station フェリーターミナル駅
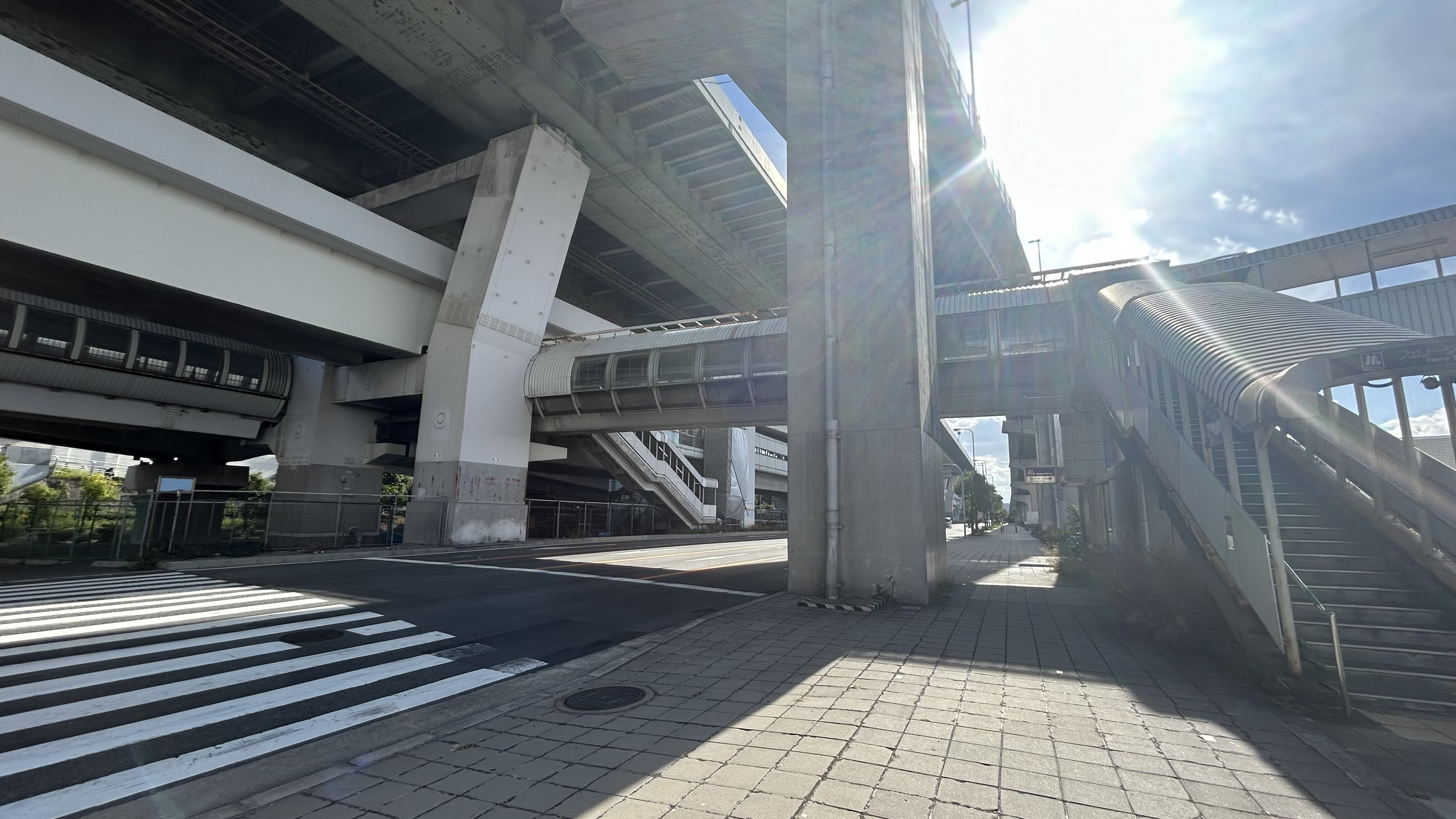
- Ferry Terminal Station

General information
- Location: 2-68 Nanko Naka 3-chome Suminoe Ward, Osaka; Japan
- System: Osaka Metro
- Operator: Osaka Metro
- Line: Nankō Port Town Line
- Platforms: 1 island platform
- Tracks: 2

Construction
- Structure type: Elevated

Other information
- Station code: P 14

History
- Opened: 16 March 1981; 45 years ago

Services
Preceding station	Osaka Metro	Following station
Port Town-higashi P 13 towards Cosmosquare	Nankō Port Town Line	Nankō-higashi P 15 towards Suminoekōen
Location
- Location within Osaka Prefecture Location within Japan

Ferry Terminal Station (フェリーターミナル駅, Ferii Tāminaru Eki) is a train station on the Nankō Port Town Line (New Tram) in Suminoe-ku, Osaka, Japan. The station is assigned the station number P14.

The station is connected to the Osaka Nankō Ferry Terminal of the Osaka Port by an elevated pedestrian walkway.

The station opened on March 16, 1981.

== Layout ==
- There are an island platform and 2 tracks elevated.

1	■ Nankō Port Town Line	for Suminoekōen
2	■ Nankō Port Town Line	for Nakafutō and Cosmosquare

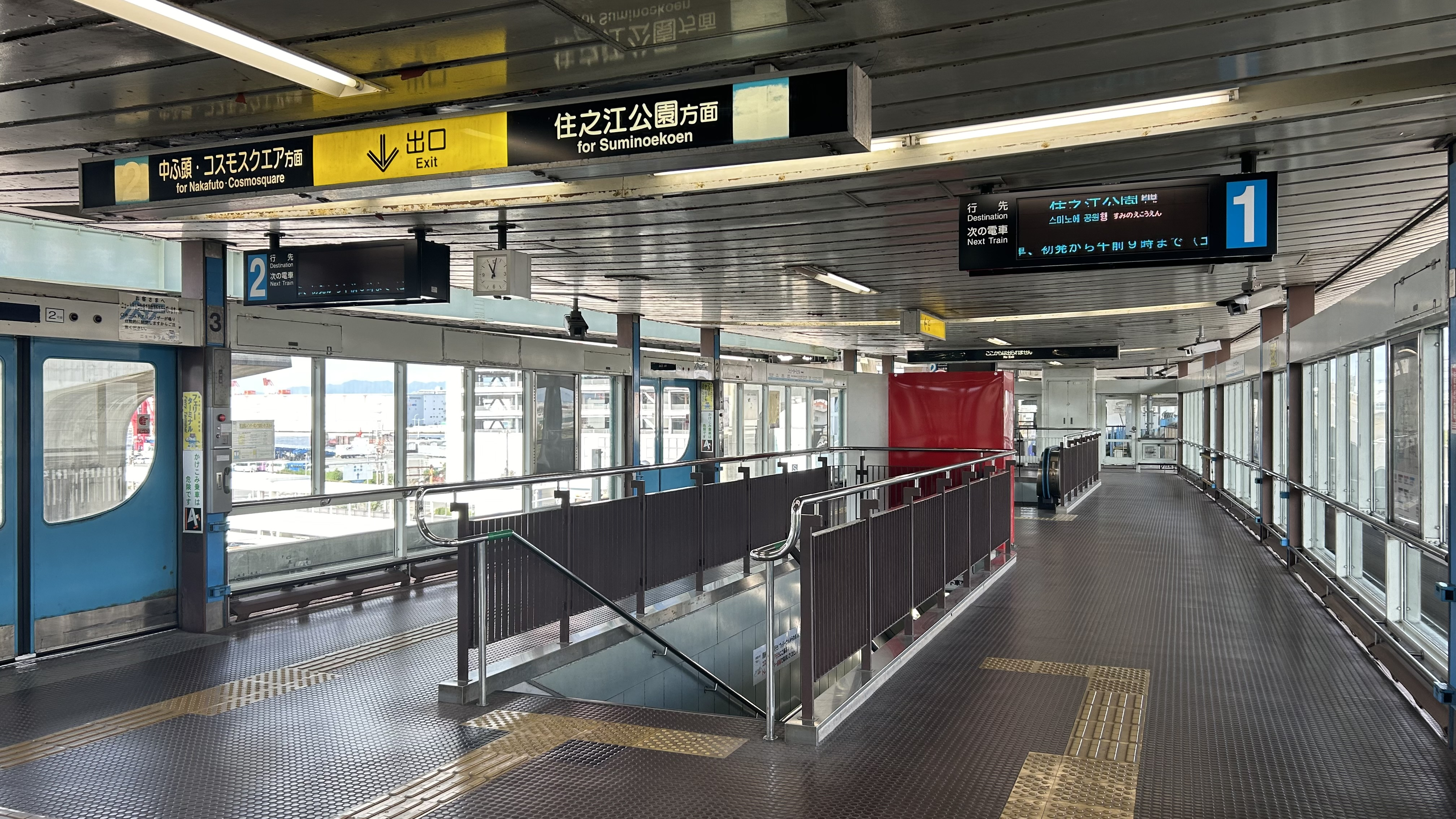

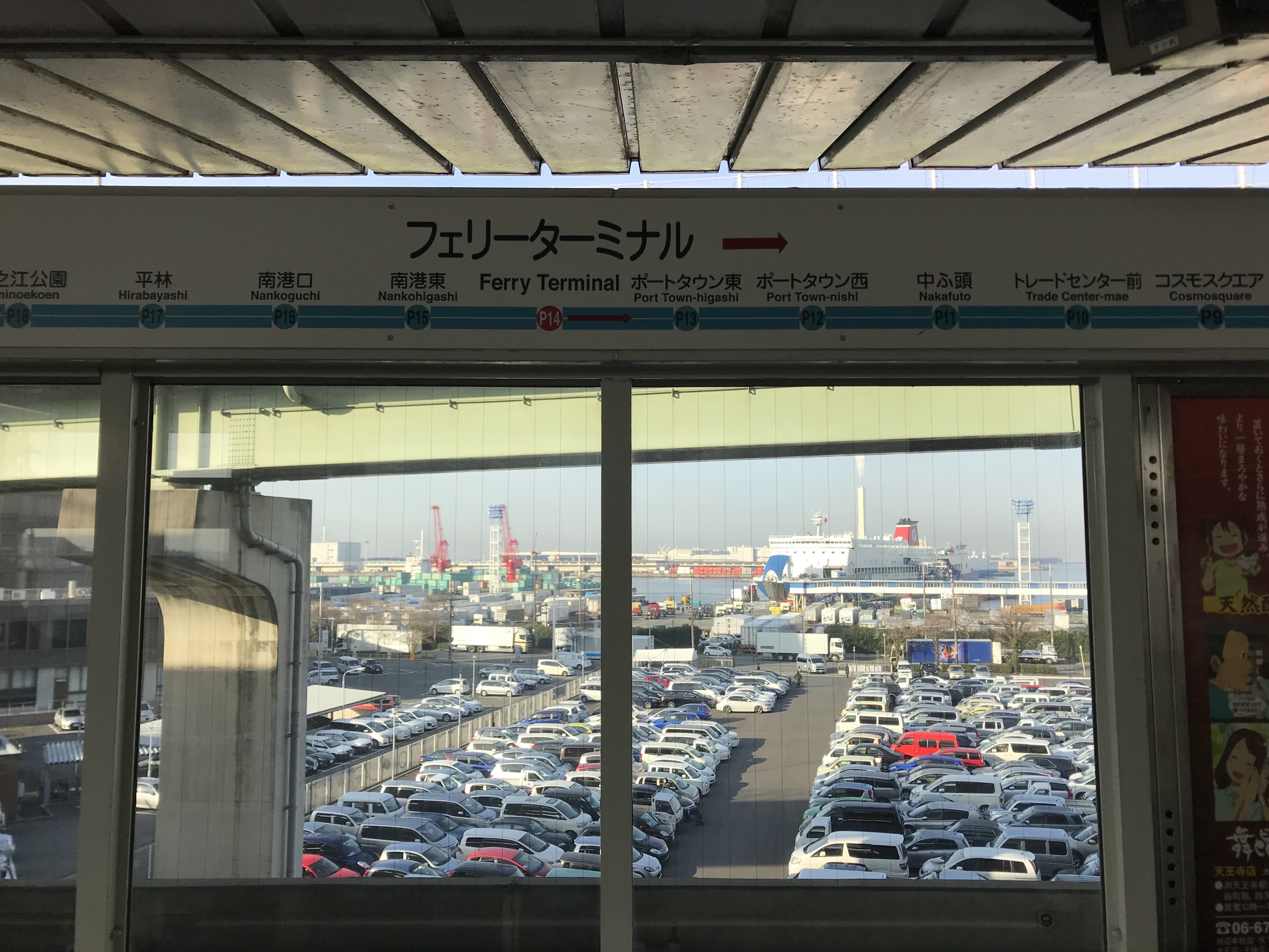

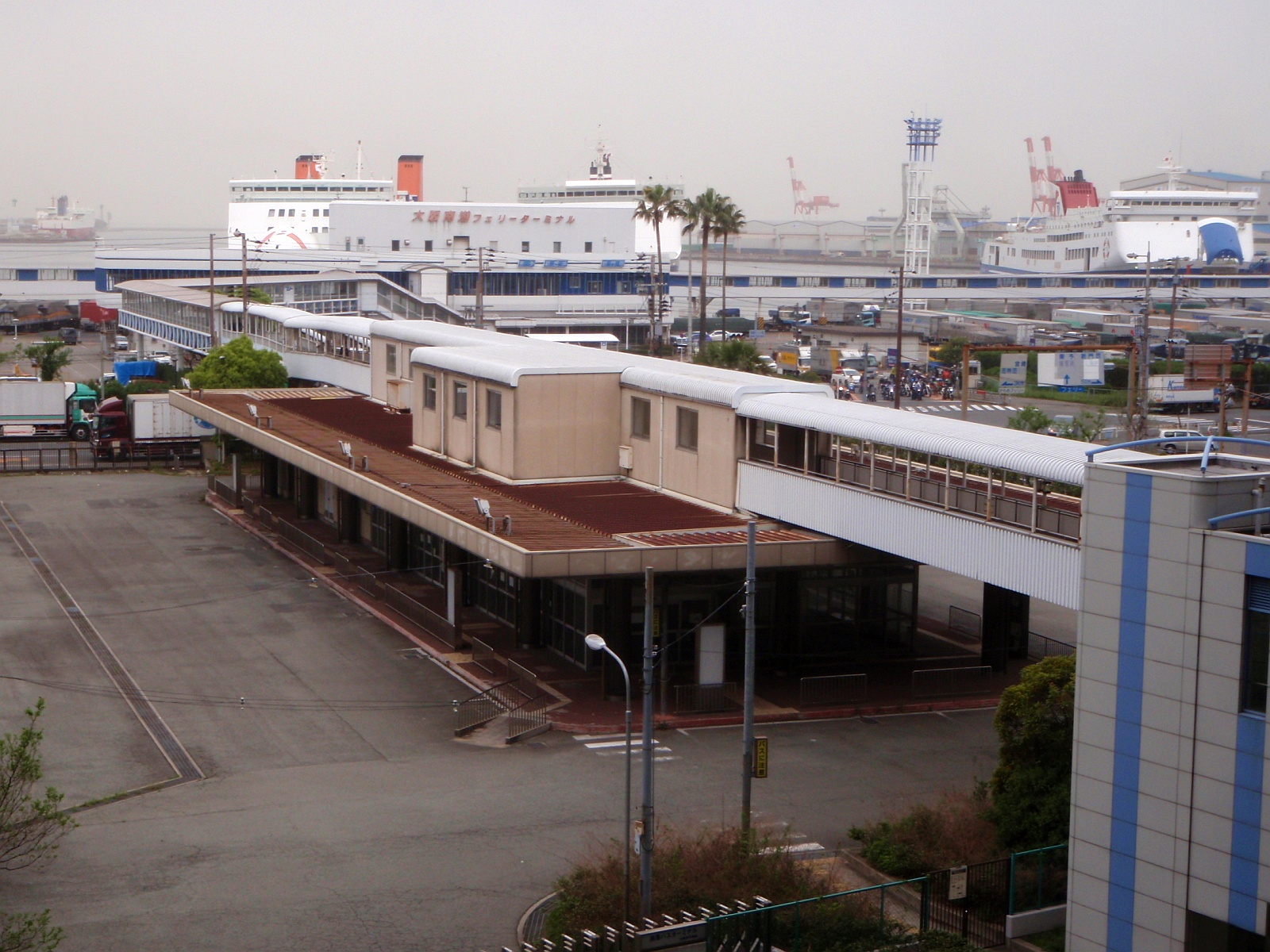

== Passenger statistics ==
In 2013 Ferry Terminal Station was the least used station in the Osaka Metro's network with only 3,472 daily passengers.
