= Hirabayashi Station (Osaka) =

Metro station in Osaka, Japan

Coordinates: 34°36′38″N 135°27′31″E

Hirabayashi Station 平林駅
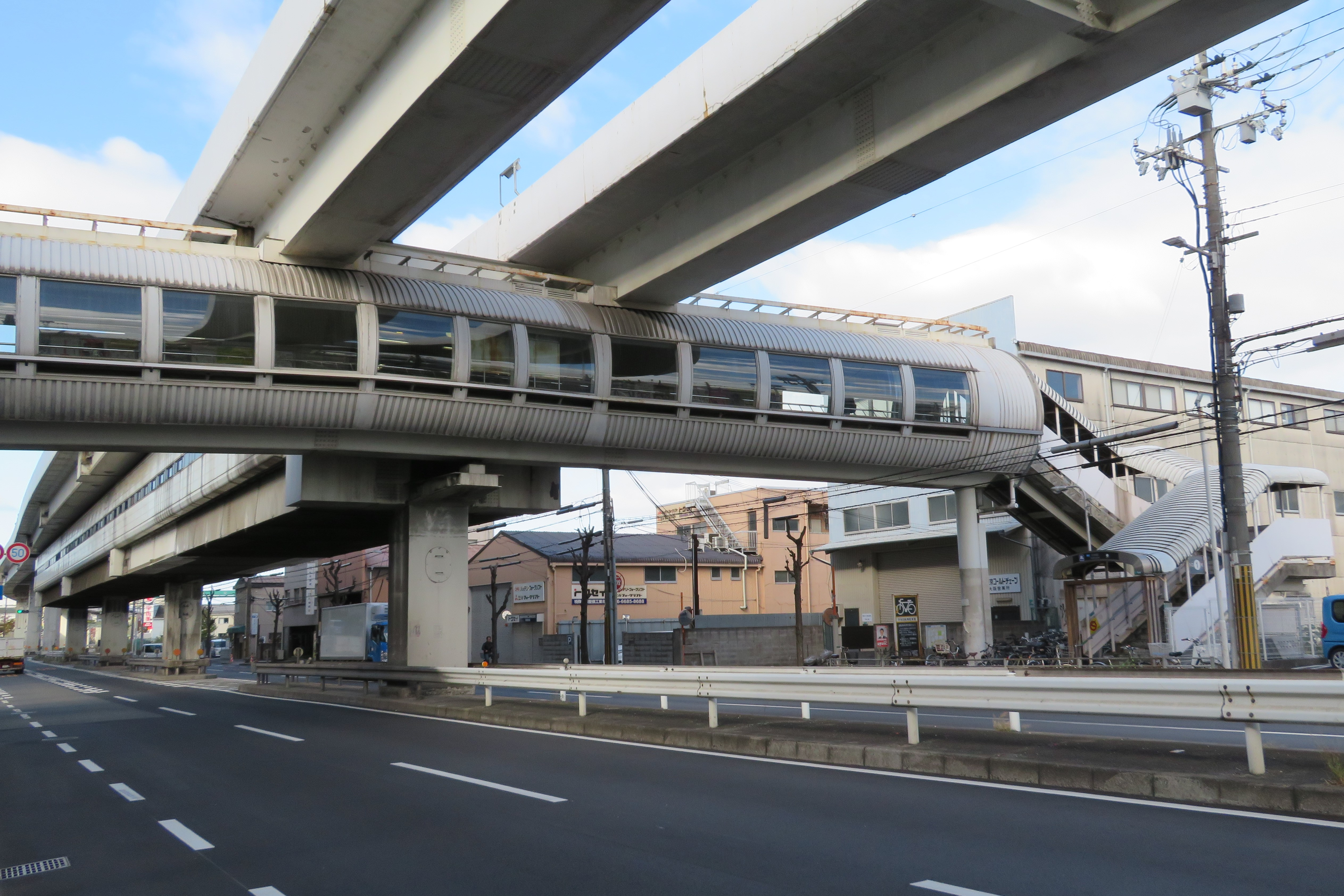
- Hirabayashi Station

General information
- Location: 1-2 Hirabayashi Minami; Suminoe Ward, Osaka; Japan
- System: Osaka Metro
- Operator: Osaka Metro
- Line: Nankō Port Town Line
- Platforms: 1 island platform
- Tracks: 2

Construction
- Structure type: Elevated

Other information
- Station code: P 17

History
- Opened: 16 March 1981; 45 years ago

Services
Preceding station	Osaka Metro	Following station
Nankōguchi P 16 towards Cosmosquare	Nankō Port Town Line	Suminoekōen P 18 Terminus
Location
- Location within Osaka Prefecture Location within Japan

Hirabayashi Station (平林駅, Hirabayashi-eki) is a railway station on the Nankō Port Town Line (New Tram) in Suminoe-ku, Osaka, Japan.

== Lines ==
- Nankō Port Town Line (Station Number: P17)

== Layout ==
- There is an elevated island platform with two tracks. The station is completely walled in with glass walls.

1	■ Nankō Port Town Line	for Suminoekōen
2	■ Nankō Port Town Line	for Nakafuto and Cosmosquare
