= List of railway stations in Japan: P =

This list shows the railway stations in Japan that begin with the letter P. This is a subset of the full list of railway stations in Japan.List of railway stations in Japan

A	B	C	D	E	F	G	H	I	J	KL	M	N	O	P	R	S	T	U	W	Y	Z

== Station list ==
Peace Park Station	平和公園停留場 （へいわこうえん）
Pippu Station	比布駅 （ぴっぷ）
Port Terminal Station	ポートターミナル駅 （ぽーとたーみなる）
Port Town-higashi Station	ポートタウン東駅 （ぽーとたうんひがし）
Port Town-nishi Station	ポートタウン西駅 （ぽーとたうんにし）
Prefectural Office Station	県庁前駅 (沖縄県)（けんちょうまえ）
