= Ferry station =

Ferry station may refer to:

- Ferry Avenue station, Camden, New Jersey
- Ferry Street station, Detroit, Michigan
- Ferry Terminal Station, Osaka, Japan
- Ferry railway station, Cambridgeshire
- South Ferry station (IRT elevated), Manhattan, New York City

== See also ==
- Ferry terminal
