= Trade Center-mae Station =

Metro station in Osaka, Japan

Coordinates: 34.6388°N 135.4122°E

Trade Center-mae Station トレードセンター前駅
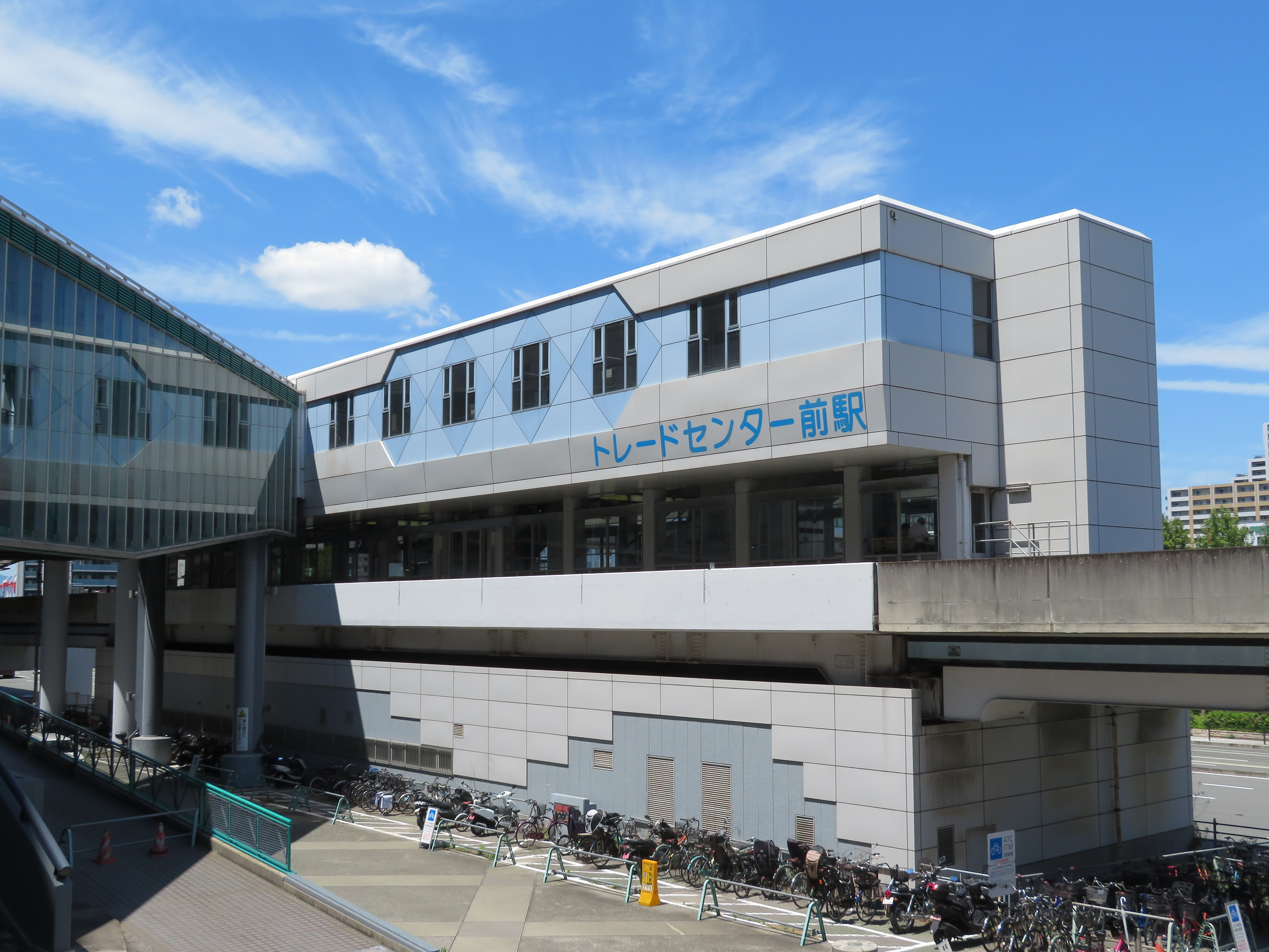
- Station building

General information
- System: Osaka Metro
- Operator: Osaka Metro
- Line: Nankō Port Town Line
- Platforms: 1 island platform
- Tracks: 2

Construction
- Structure type: Elevated

Other information
- Station code: P 10
- Website: Official website

History
- Opened: 18 December 1997; 28 years ago

Services
Preceding station	Osaka Metro	Following station
Cosmosquare P 09 Terminus	Nankō Port Town Line	Nakafutō P 11 towards Suminoekōen
Location
- Location within Osaka Prefecture Location within Japan

Trade Center-mae Station (トレードセンター前駅, Torēdosentā-mae-eki; lit. "In front of Trade Center") is a train station on the Nankō Port Town Line (New Tram) in Suminoe-ku, Osaka, Japan. The station serves Osaka Prefectural Government Sakishima Building (formerly Osaka World Trade Center Building or WTC Cosmo Tower), the third tallest building in Japan, from which it got its name from.

== Lines ==
- Nankō Port Town Line (Station Number: P10)

== History ==
- The station opened to rail traffic on December 18, 1997, on the Osaka Port Transport System Techno Port Line.
- On July 1, 2005, Osaka Municipal Transportation Bureau took over management of the station
- On April 1, 2018, Osaka Metro took over management of the station

== Layout ==
This station has an elevated island platform serving two tracks. The station is completely walled in with glass walls.

1	■ Nankō Port Town Line	for Nakafuto and Suminoekōen
2	■ Nankō Port Town Line	for Cosmosquare

== Surroundings ==
- Osaka Prefectural Government Sakishima Building
- Asia and Pacific Trade Center (ATC)
  - Osaka Nanko Cosmo Ferry Terminal
  - ATC O's Quay
- Osaka Nanko Bird Sanctuary
- Hyatt Regency Osaka
- ABC-Mart
- Osaka Maritime Museum (closed)

== Passenger statistics ==
During its annual Osaka Metro survey on November 10, 2020, 5,893 passengers boarded trains at Trade Center-mae Station on a single day. However, this number was likely skewed due to the impact of the COVID-19 pandemic that year.
