= Port Town-nishi Station =

Metro station in Osaka, Japan

Coordinates: 34.630948°N 135.422823°E

Port Town-nishi Station ポートタウン西駅
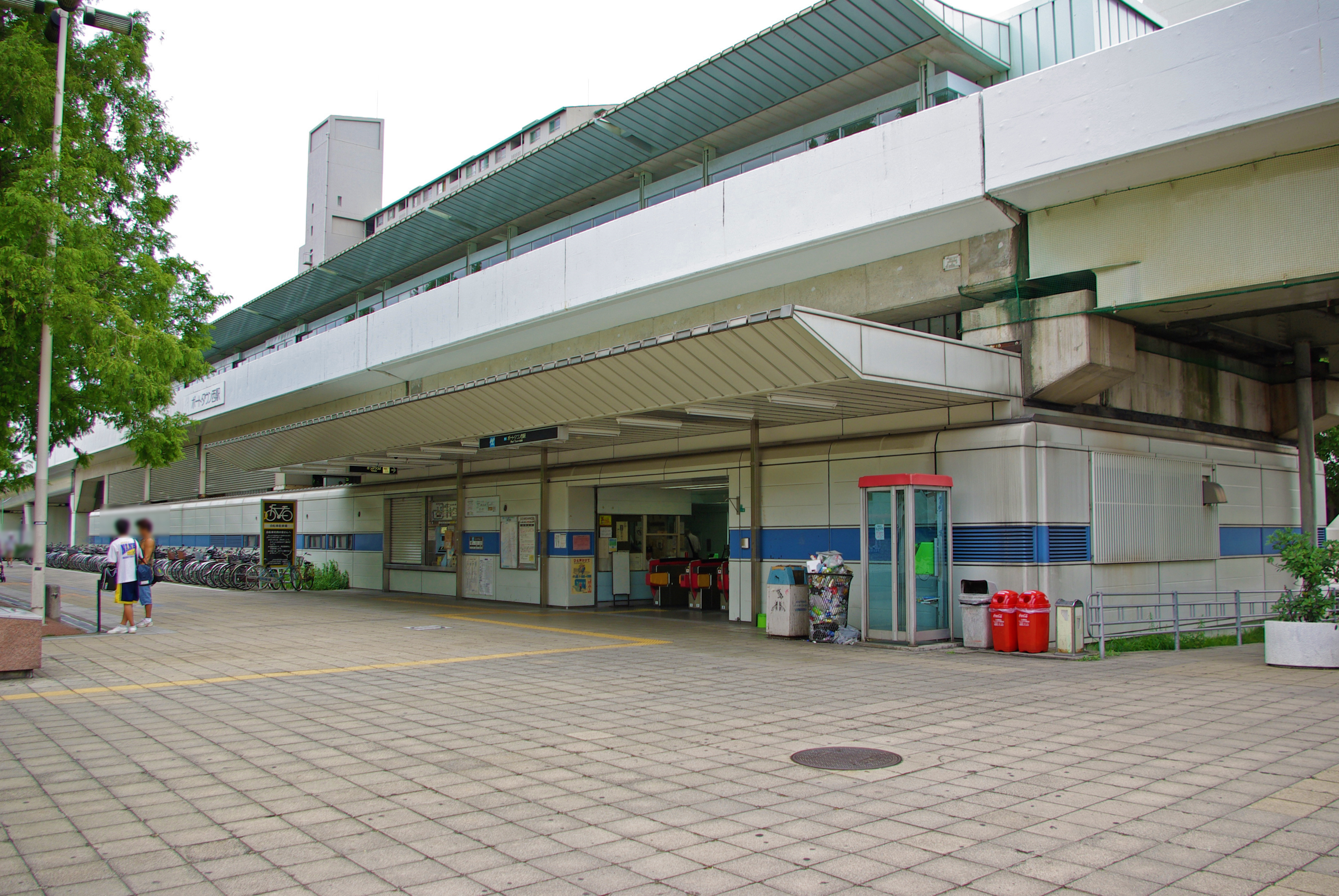
- Port Town-nishi Station

General information
- Location: 2-68 Nanko Naka 3-chome Suminoe Ward, Osaka; Japan
- System: Osaka Metro
- Operator: Osaka Metro
- Line: Nankō Port Town Line
- Platforms: 1 island platform
- Tracks: 2

Construction
- Structure type: Elevated

Other information
- Station code: P 12

History
- Opened: 16 March 1981; 45 years ago

Services
Preceding station	Osaka Metro	Following station
Nakafuto P 11 towards Cosmosquare	Nankō Port Town Line	Port Town-higashi P 13 towards Suminoekōen
Location
- Location within Osaka Prefecture Location within Japan

Port Town-nishi Station (ポートタウン西駅, Pōtotaun-nishi-eki; station number: P12) is a train station on the Nankō Port Town Line (New Tram) in Suminoe-ku, Osaka, Japan. It literally means "Port Town West".

== Layout ==
There is an elevated island platform with two tracks. The station is completely walled in with glass walls.

1	■ Nankō Port Town Line	for Suminoekōen
2	■ Nankō Port Town Line	for Nakafuto and Cosmosquare

== Surroundings ==
- Nanko Park
