= Morinomiya University of Medical Sciences =

Coordinates: 34°38′29″N 135°24′49″E

- 森ノ宮医療大学
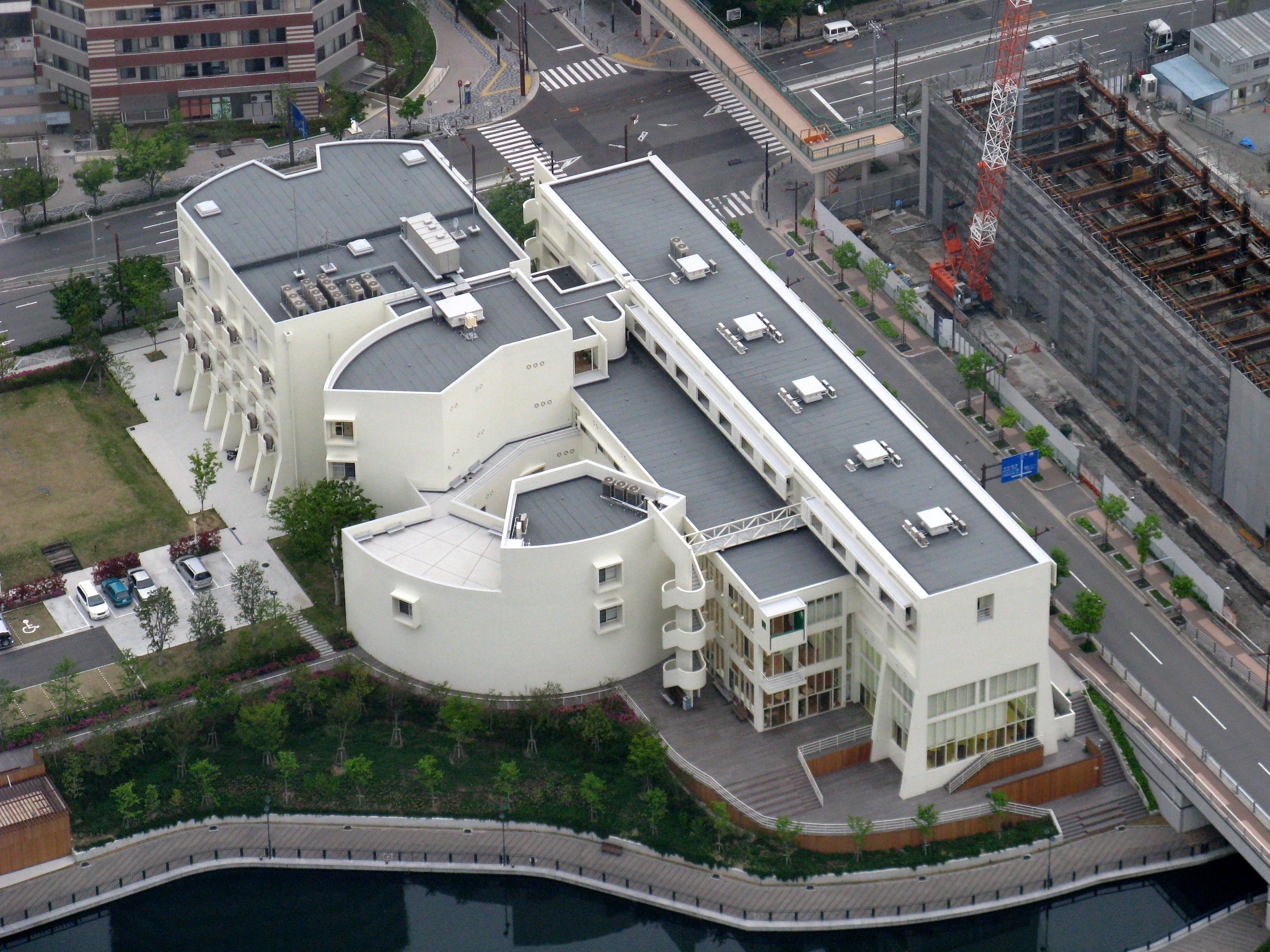
- Main building
- Type: Private
- Location: Suminoe-ku, Osaka, Japan
- Campus: Urban
- Website: www.morinomiya-u.ac.jp
- Location in Osaka Prefecture

Morinomiya University of Medical Sciences (森ノ宮医療大学, Morinomiya iryō daigaku) is a private university in Suminoe-ku, Osaka, Japan, established in 2007.
