= Nankō Port Town Line =

Automated People Mover (APM) line of the Osaka Metro in Osaka prefecture, Japan

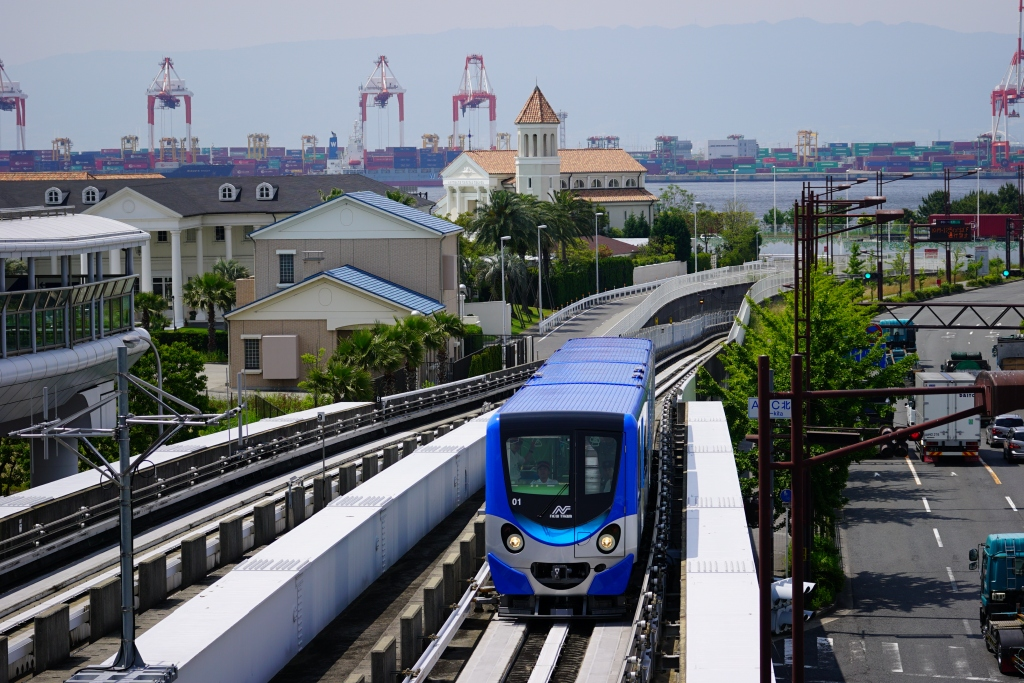
- A 200 series trainset in May 2016

Overview
- Owner: Osaka Metro (Trade Center-mae – Suminoekoen); Osaka Port Transport System Co., Ltd. (Cosmosquare – Trade Center-mae)
- Line number: P
- Locale: Suminoe-ku, Osaka
- Termini: Cosmosquare; Suminoekōen
- Stations: 10
- Color on map: Cerulean (#00A0DE)

Service
- Type: Automated guideway transit
- System: New Tram
- Operator(s): Osaka Metro (2018–present); Osaka Municipal Transportation Bureau (1981–2018)
- Depot(s): Nanko
- Rolling stock: 200 series EMU

History
- Opened: 16 March 1981; 44 years ago
- Last extension: 18 December 1997; 28 years ago

Technical
- Line length: 7.9 km (4.9 mi)
- Number of tracks: Double-track
- Electrification: 600 V 60 Hz 3-phase AC (third rail, side contact)
- Operating speed: 55 km/h (34 mph)
Route map

The Nankō Port Town Line (南港ポートタウン線, Nankō Pōto-taun-sen), also called New Tram, is an automated guideway transit line in Suminoe-ku, Osaka, Japan. The line is operated by Osaka Metro, and was constructed to serve as the main rapid transit line for newly built Osaka South Port habitations and facilities. An extension of the line from Cosmosquare to Trade Center-mae was once owned and operated by a subsidiary of the City of Osaka, Osaka Port Transport System Co., Ltd.. The operation of the section was later merged into Osaka Municipal Transportation Bureau itself to increase the number of passengers by reducing fares and simplifying the previously separate fare structures.

== Stations ==
All stations are in Suminoe-ku, Osaka.

No.	Station	Japanese	Distance (km)	Connections
P 09	Cosmosquare	コスモスクエア	0.0	Chūō Line (C10)
P 10	Trade Center-mae	トレードセンター前	0.6	
P 11	Nakafuto	中ふ頭	1.3	
P 12	Port Town-nishi	ポートタウン西	2.0	
P 13	Port Town-higashi	ポートタウン東	2.5	
P 14	Ferry Terminal	フェリーターミナル	4.0	
P 15	Nankō-higashi	南港東	4.8	
P 16	Nankōguchi	南港口	5.4	
P 17	Hirabayashi	平林	6.7	
P 18	Suminoekōen	住之江公園	7.9	Yotsubashi Line (Y21)

== Rolling stock ==
As of 1 April 2019, the following train types are used on the line, all formed as four-car sets.

- 200 series four-car sets (since 29 June 2016)

=== 200 series ===
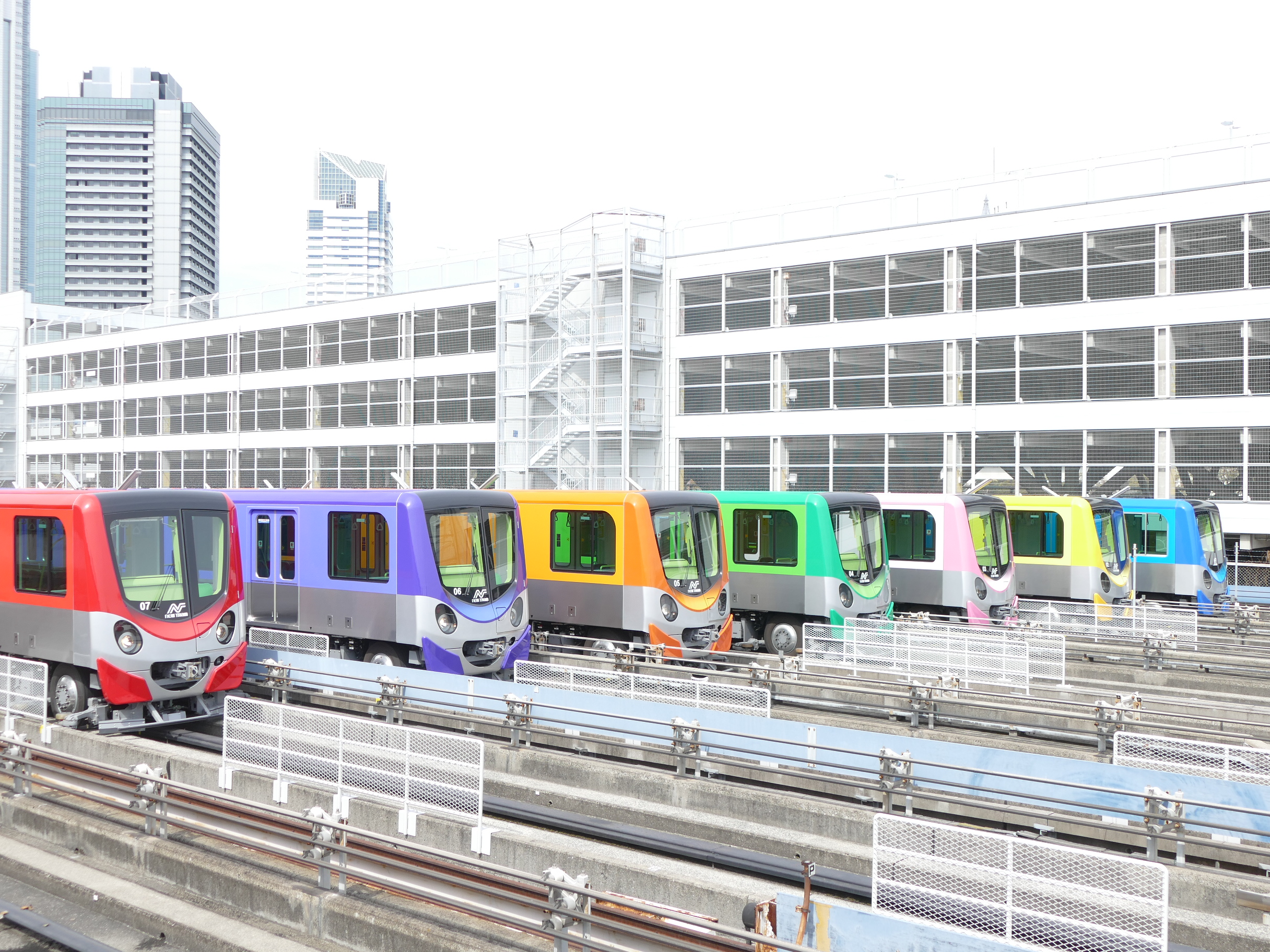
The fleet of seven trains in March 2017

A fleet of four-car 200 series trainsets was introduced between 2016 and March 2017, all finished in different colour liveries. The first set, 01, entered revenue service on 29 June 2016, followed by the second set, 02, in October 2016.

As of July 2019, the 200 series fleet consists of twenty sets (numbered 01 to 21 (excluding 13)), and formed as follows. The trains have stainless steel bodies.

Set No.	Car numbers				Livery	Manufacture Date	Notes
01	205-01	202-01	200-01	201-01	Blue	November 2015	Series Prototype
02	205-02	202-02	200-02	201-02	Yellow	October 2016	
03	205-03	202-03	200-03	201-03	Pink	November 2016	
04	205-04	202-04	200-04	201-04	Green	December 2016	
05	205-05	202-05	200-05	201-05	Orange	January 2017	
06	205-06	202-06	200-06	201-06	Purple	February 2017	
07	205-07	202-07	200-07	201-07	Red	March 2017	
08	205-08	202-08	200-08	201-08	Blue	July 2017	
09	205-09	202-09	200-09	201-09	Yellow	August 2017	
10	205-10	202-10	200-10	201-10	Pink	September 2017	
11	205-11	202-11	200-11	201-11	Green	October 2017	
12	205-12	202-12	200-12	201-12	Red	November 2017	
14	205-14	202-14	200-14	201-14	Gold	March 2018	Osaka Metro Commemorative colors
15	205-15	202-15	200-15	201-15	Pink	May 2018	
16	205-16	202-16	200-16	201-16	Yellow	June 2018	
17	205-17	202-17	200-17	201-17	Purple	July 2018	Adwraped
18	205-18	202-18	200-18	201-18	Pink	July 2018	Adwraped
19	205-19	202-19	200-19	201-19	White	September 2018	Panda
20	205-20	202-20	200-20	201-20	Orange	February 2019	Red Panda
21	205-21	202-21	200-21	201-21	Yellow	February 2019	Dora

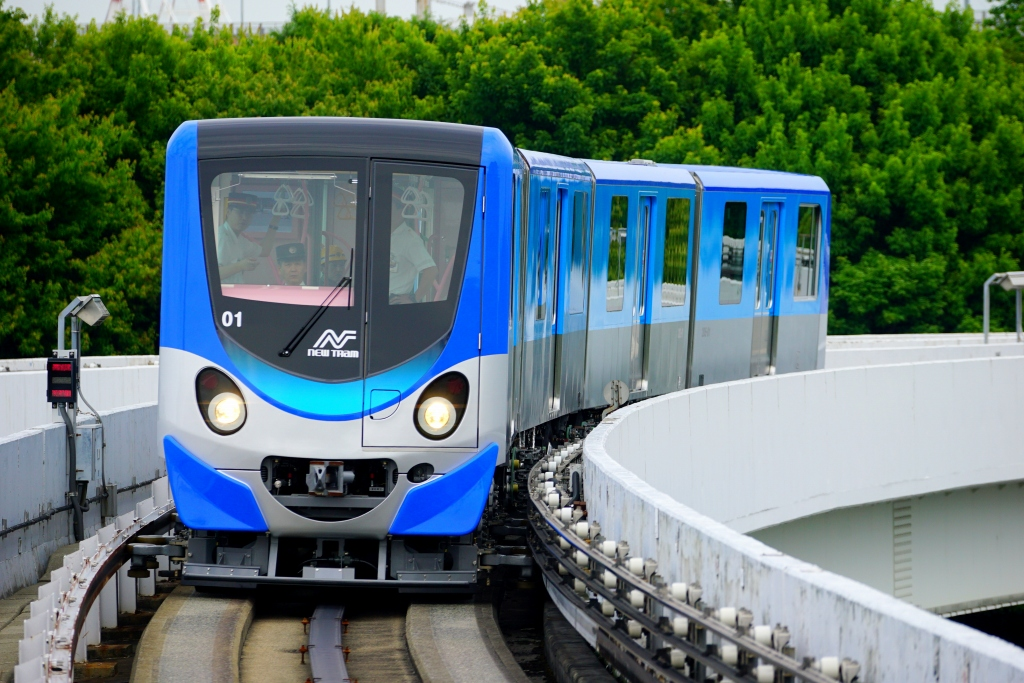
200 series set 01 in May 2016

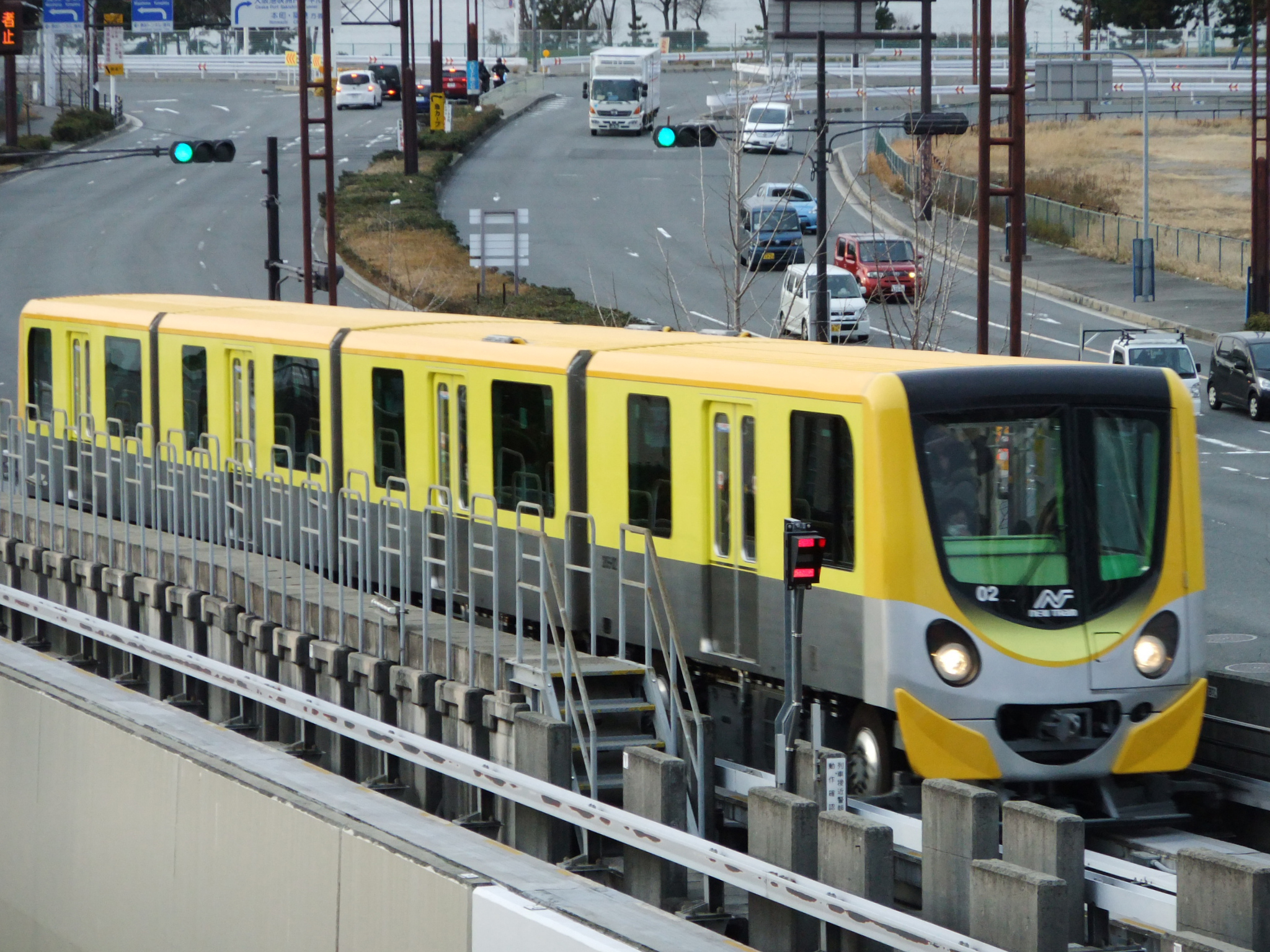
200 series set 02 in March 2017

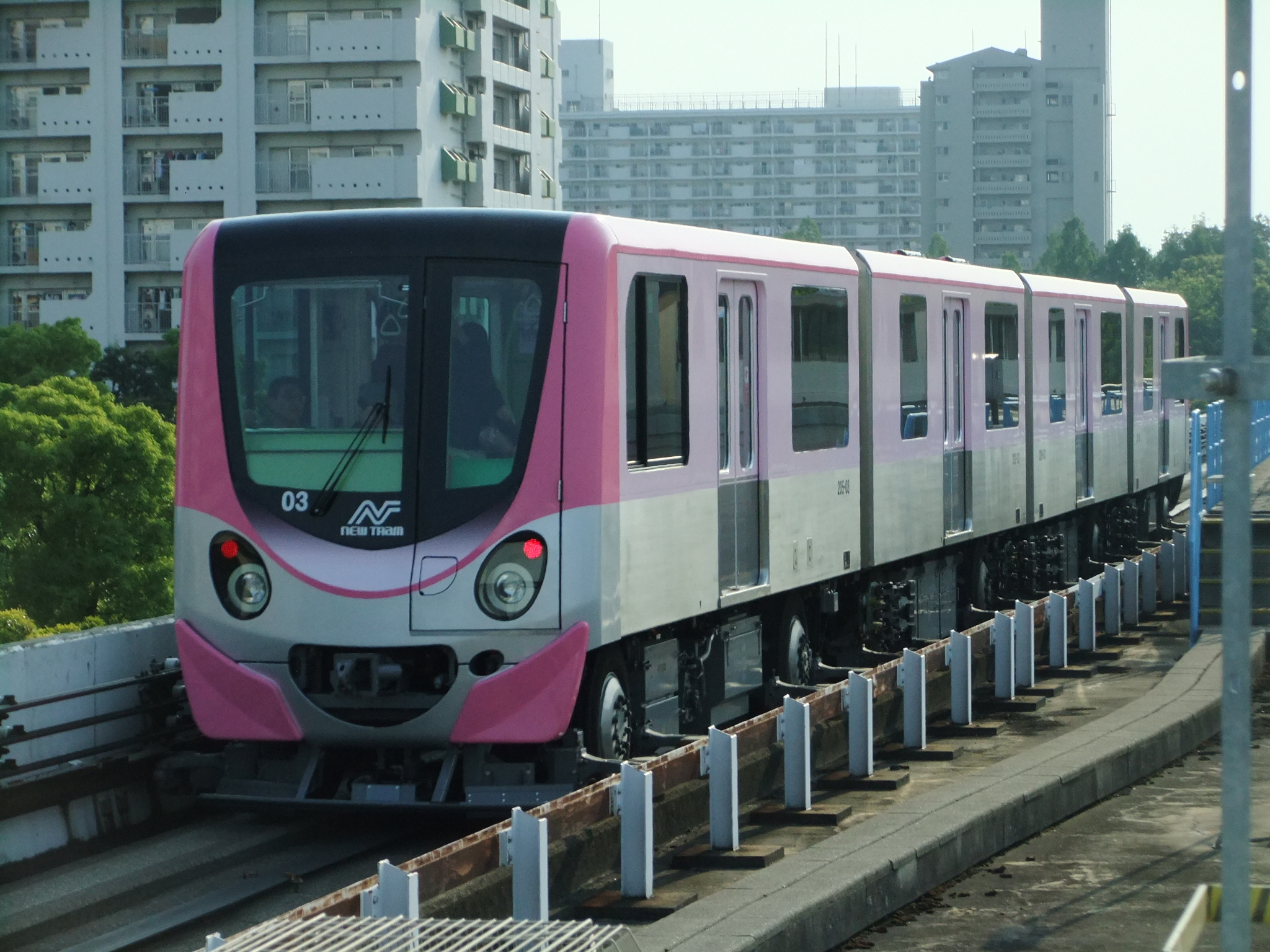
200 series set 03 in June 2017

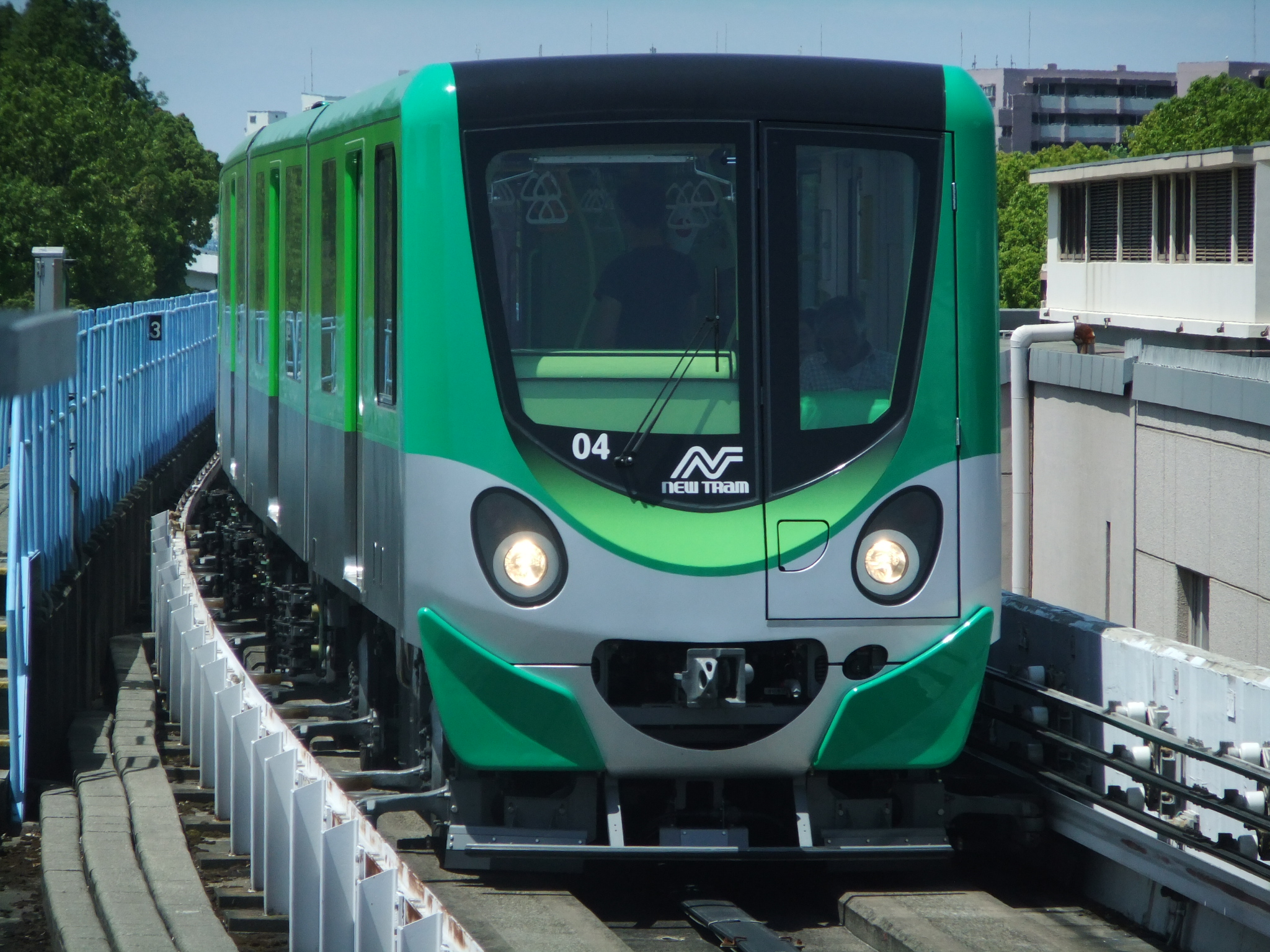
200 series set 04 in May 2017

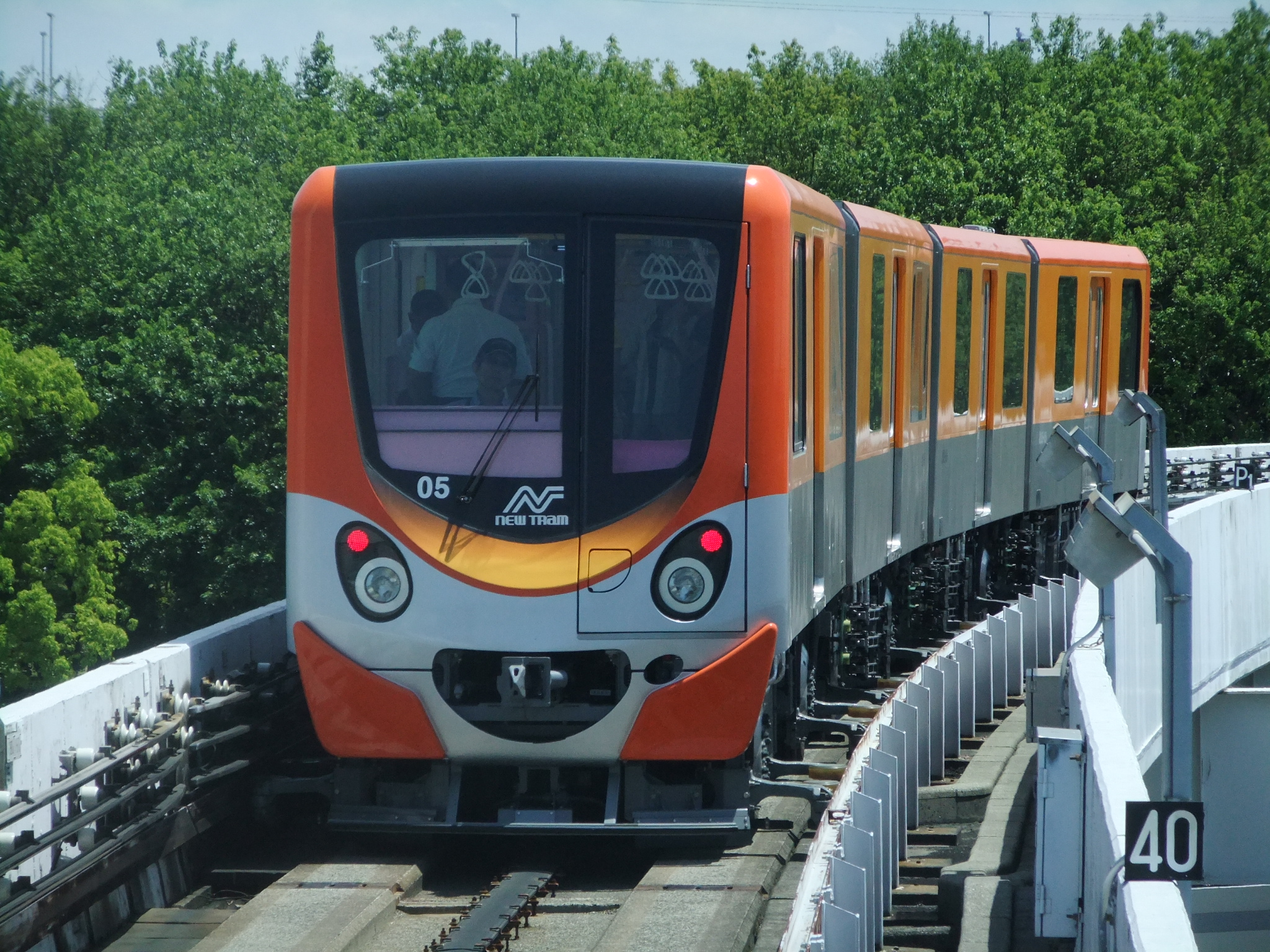
200 series set 05 in May 2017

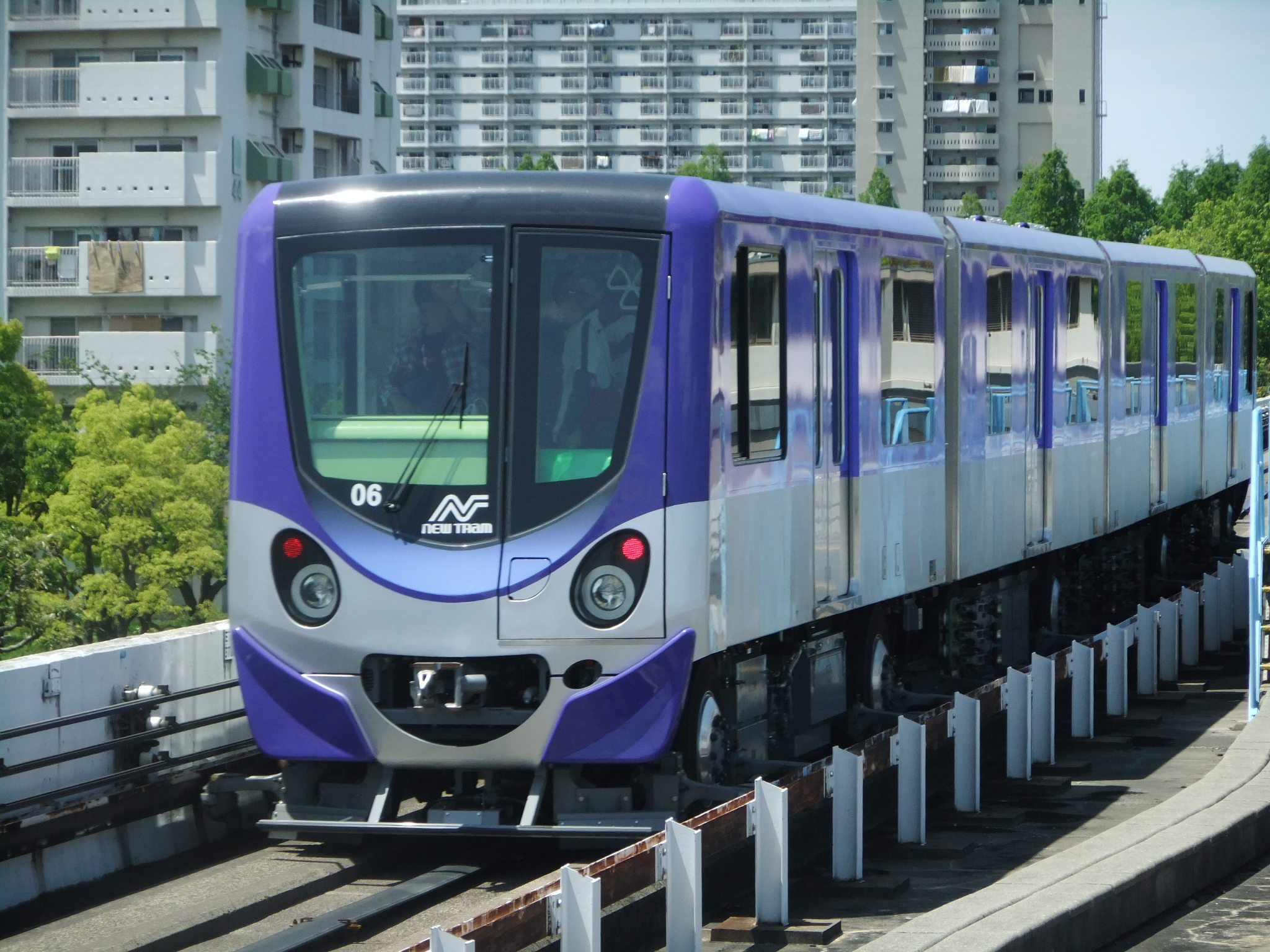
200 series set 06 in May 2017

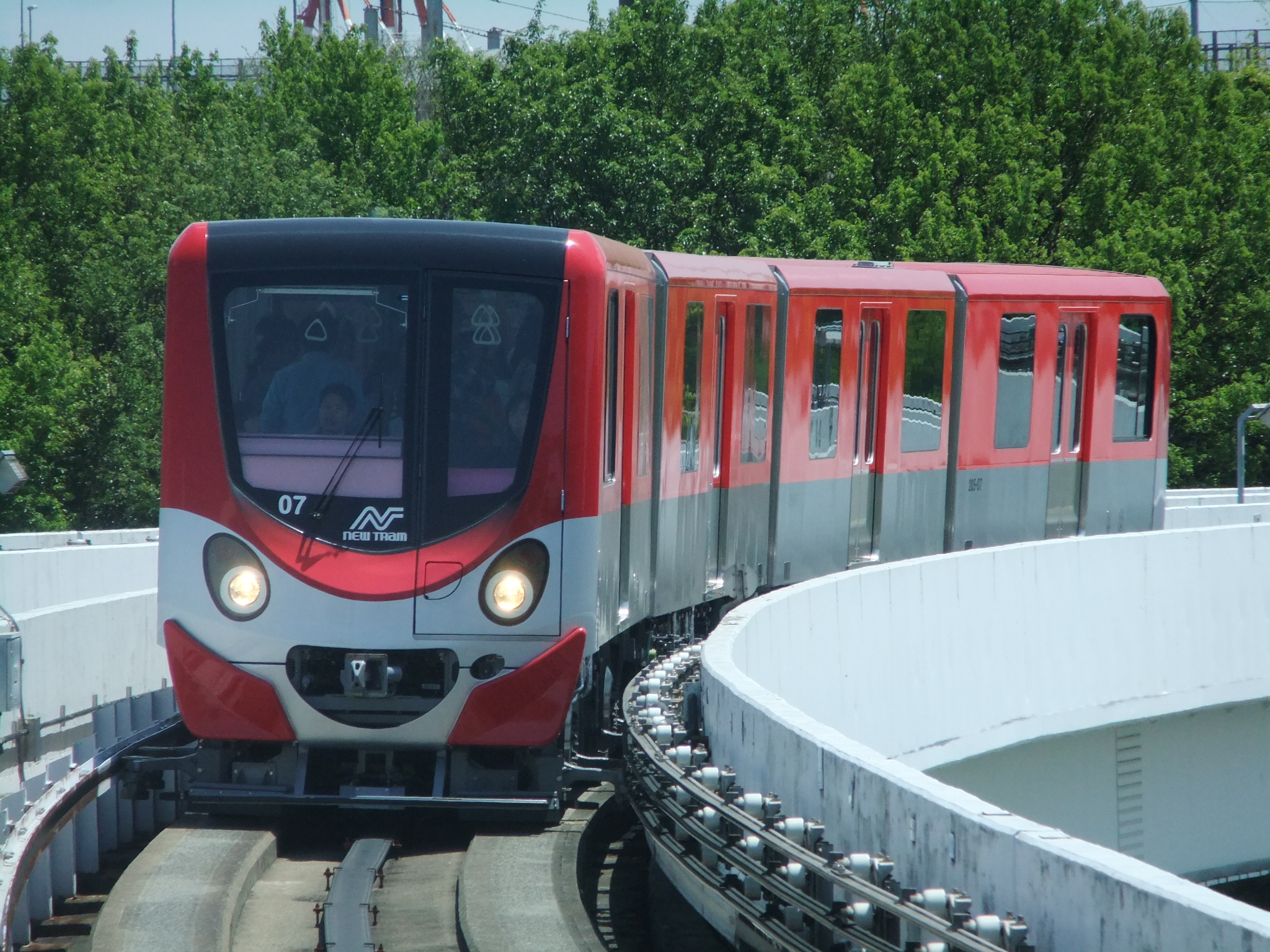
200 series set 07 in May 2017

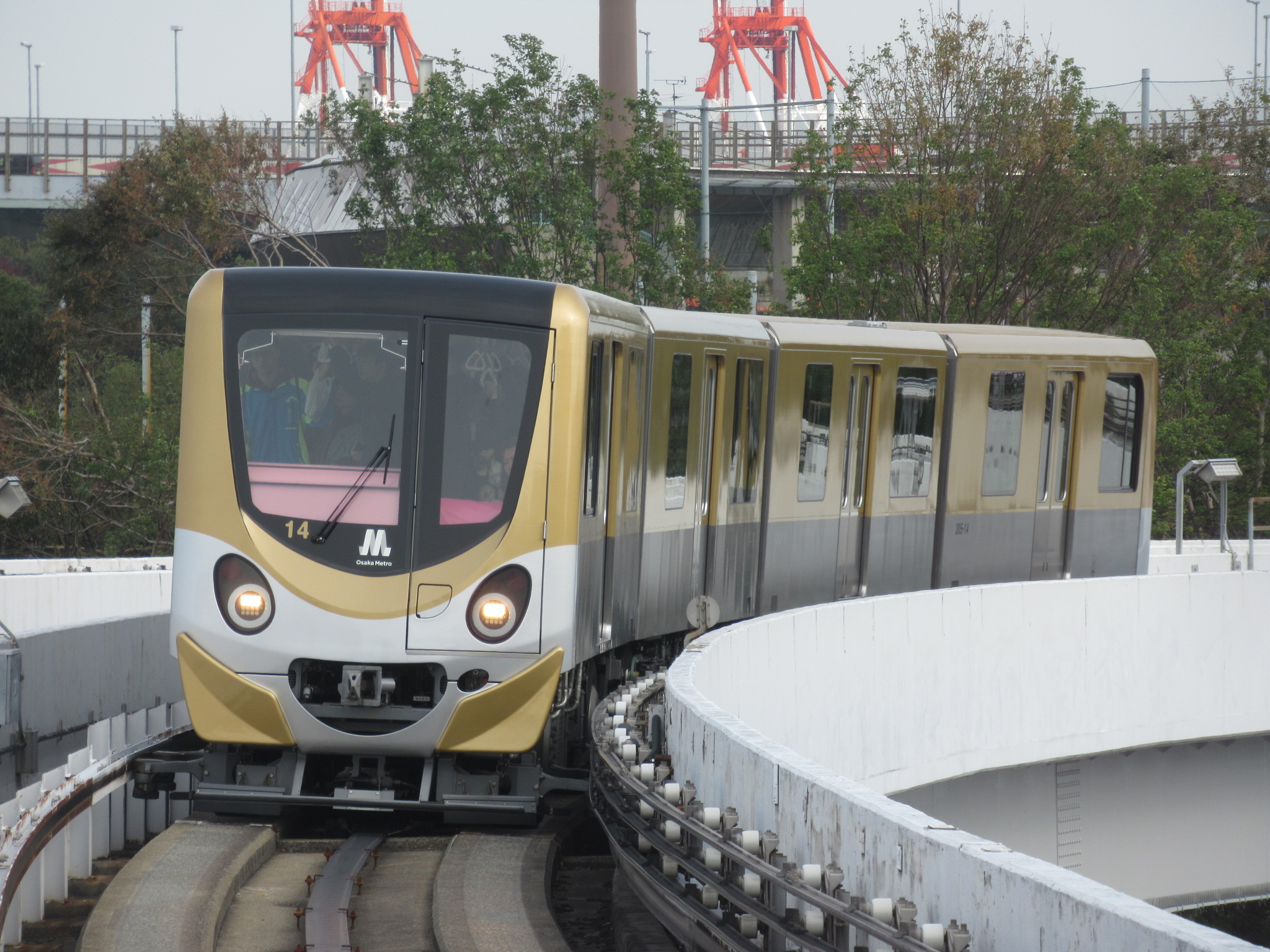
200 series set 14 in November 2018

=== Former rolling stock ===
- 100 series (1981–2001)
- 100A series (1991-2019)
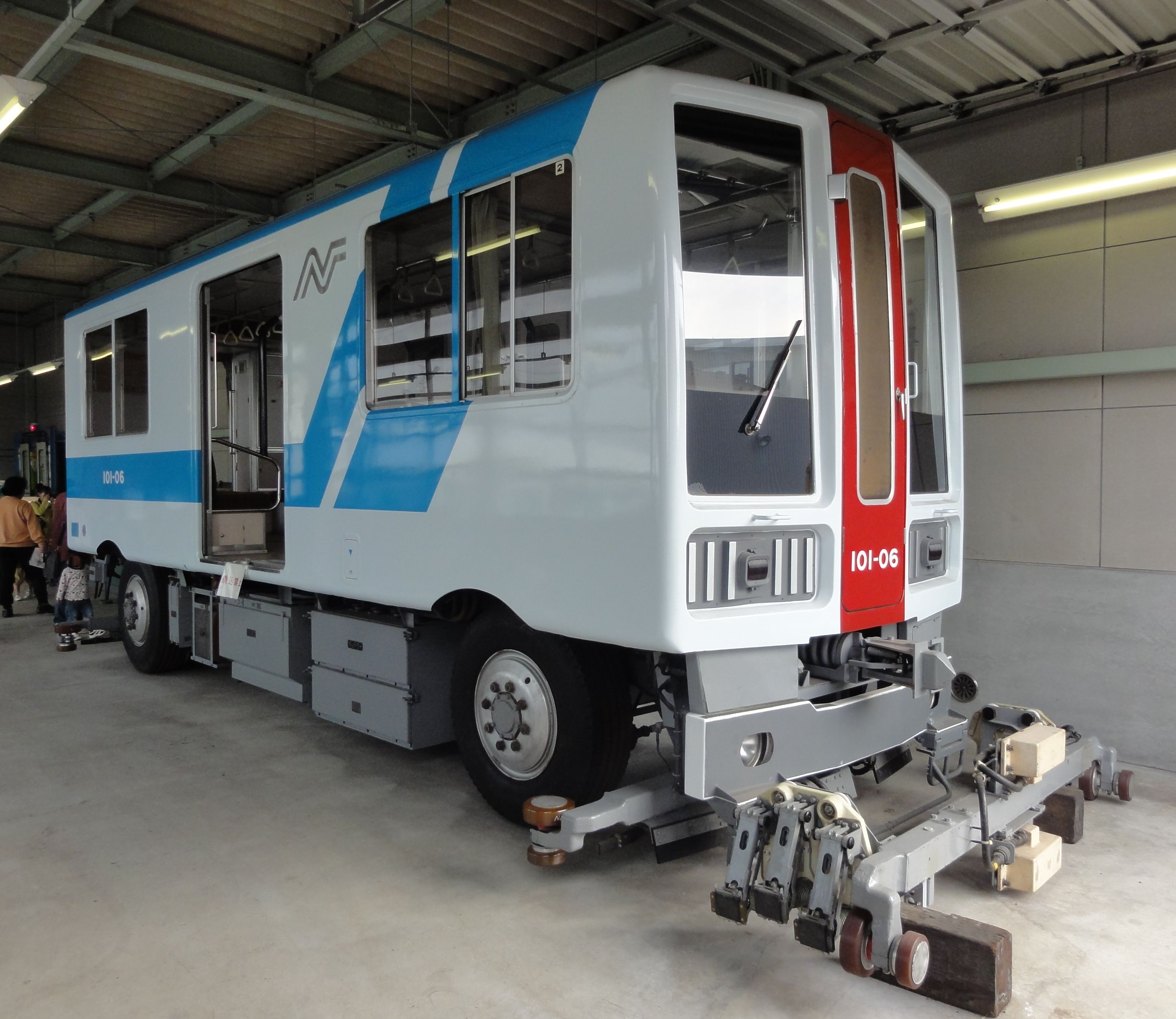
A preserved 100 series car in November 2011

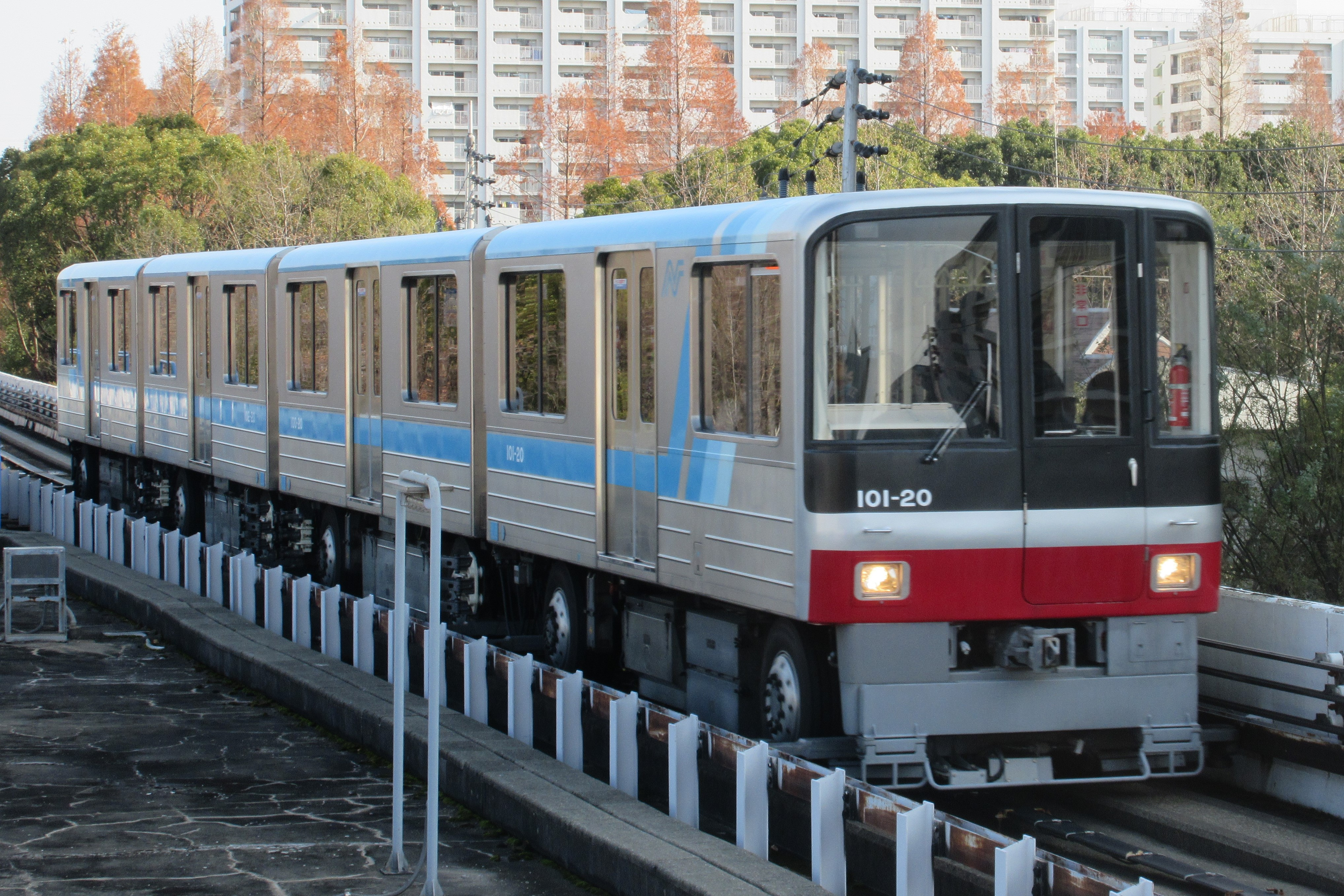
100A series set 20 in December 2015

== History ==
- March 16, 1981 – The Nankō Port Town Line from Nakafuto to Suminoekōen opened, making it the second-oldest AGT line in Japan after Kobe's Port Island Line, and the first licensed application of the Vought Airtrans people mover system outside the United States. Trains run using GoA2 semi-automatic mode with driver on board, and all stations are fitted with full-height platform screen doors, a first in Osaka.
- October 20, 1991 – 100A series trains begin operations, along with fully automatic GoA4 operations.
- October 5, 1993 – Operations were suspended due to an accident that occurred at Suminoekōen Station; operations resumed on November 19, 1993 in GoA2 semi-automatic mode.
- December 18, 1997 – The Osaka Port Transport System Co., Ltd. New Tram Technoport Line (ニュートラムテクノポート線) from Cosmosquare to Nakafutō opened.
- February 20, 2000 – Unattended GoA4 operations resume.
- July 1, 2005 – The OTS New Tram Technoport Line was merged to the Nankō Port Town Line.

== Statistics ==
- Distance: 7.9 km (incl. former OTS Line 1.3 km)
- Power: 600 V three phase AC, side contact
- Line color: cerulean blue
- Symbol letter: P

== See also ==
- Transport in Keihanshin
- List of rapid transit systems
