= Nakafuto Station (Osaka) =

Metro station in Osaka, Japan

Nakafuto Station 中ふ頭駅
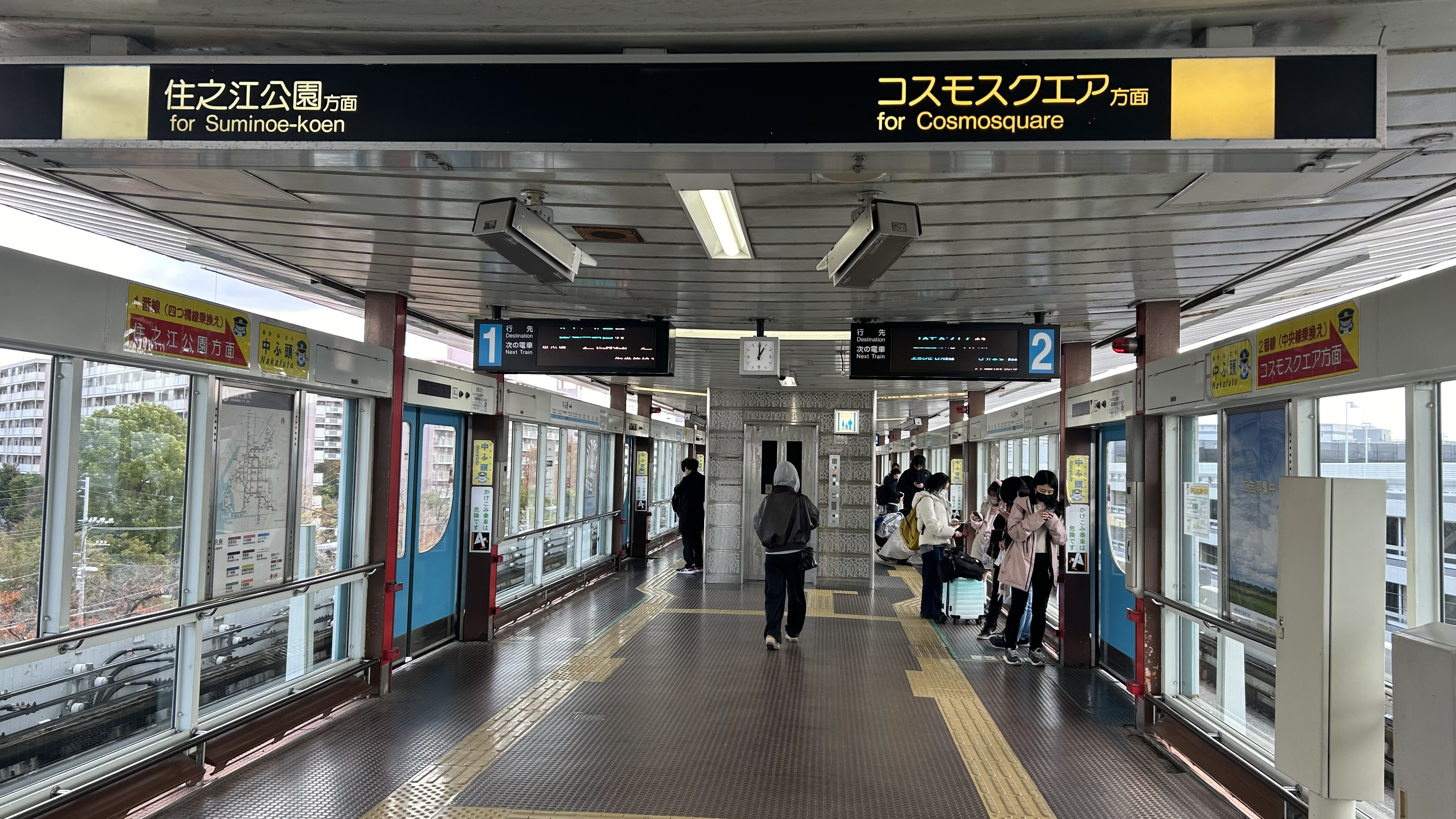
- Station platform

General information
- Location: Nankō-naka 5-chōme, Suminoe-ku, Osaka (大阪市住之江区南港中5丁目); Japan
- Coordinates: 34°38′03″N 135°25′03″E
- System: Osaka Metro
- Operator: Osaka Metro
- Line: Nankō Port Town Line
- Platforms: 1 island platform
- Tracks: 2

Construction
- Structure type: Elevated

Other information
- Station code: P 11

History
- Opened: 16 March 1981; 45 years ago

Passengers
- 6,958 daily

Services
Preceding station	Osaka Metro	Following station
Trade Center-mae P 10 towards Cosmosquare	Nankō Port Town Line	Port Town-nishi P 12 towards Suminoekōen
Location
- Location within Osaka Prefecture Location within Japan

Nakafuto Station (中ふ頭駅, Nakafutō-eki; lit. Central Pier) is a train station on the Nankō Port Town Line (New Tram) in Suminoe-ku, Osaka, Japan.

== Lines ==
- Nankō Port Town Line (Station Number: P11)

== Layout ==
There is an elevated island platform with two tracks. The station is completely walled in with glass walls.

1	■ Nankō Port Town Line	for Suminoekōen
2	■ Nankō Port Town Line	for Cosmosquare
