= Cosmosquare Station =

Metro station in Osaka, Japan

Coordinates: 34°38′35″N 135°24′45″E

Cosmosquare Station コスモスクエア駅
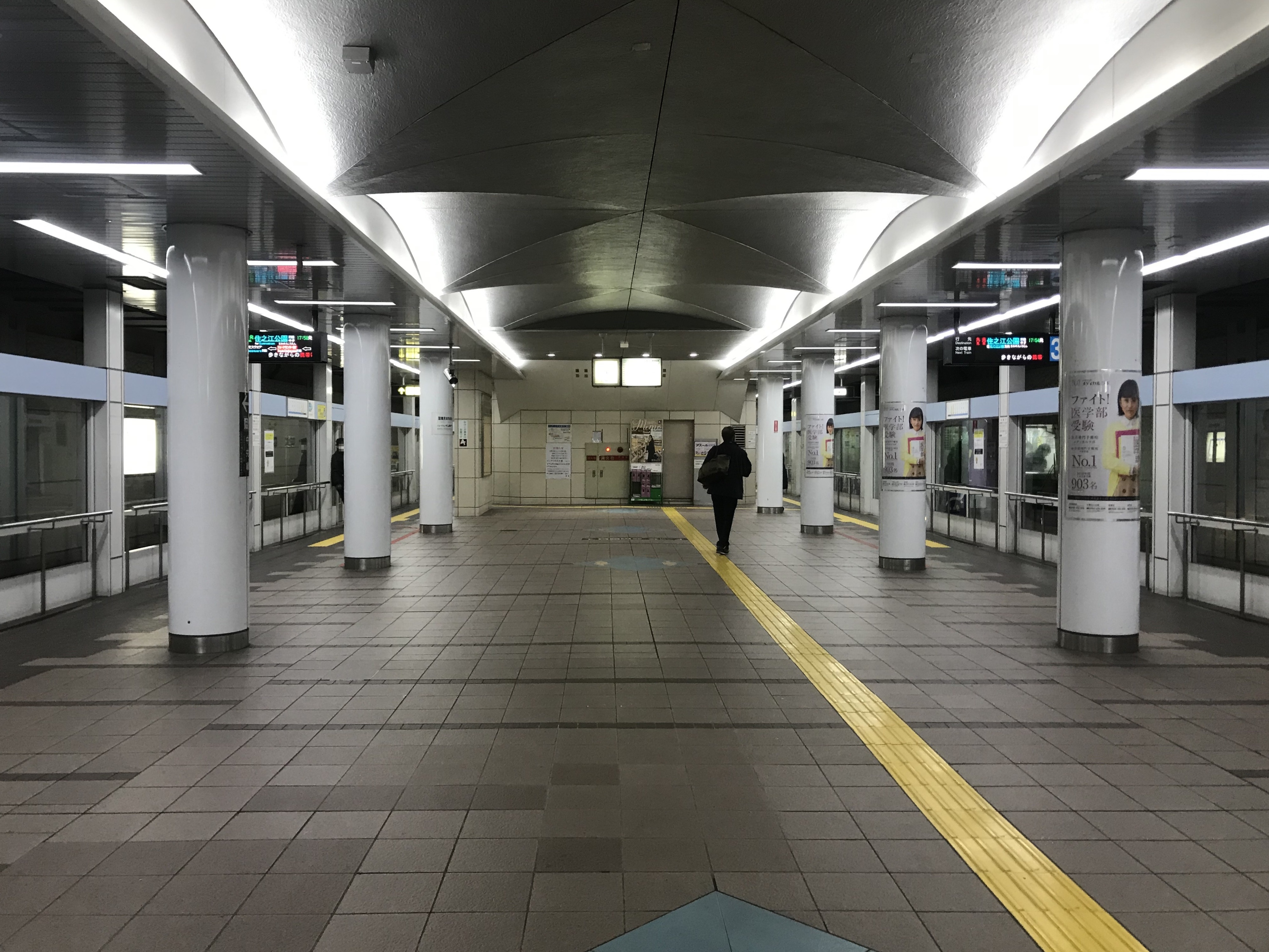
- Nanko Port Town Line platform, January 2019

General information
- Location: 1-30-21 Nankōkita, Suminoe, Osaka, Osaka （大阪市住之江区南港北一丁目30-21） Japan
- System: Osaka Metro
- Operator: Osaka Metro
- Lines: Chūō Line; Nankō Port Town Line
- Platforms: 2 island platforms (1 on each level)
- Tracks: 4 (2 on each level)

Other information
- Station code: C 10 P 09

History
- Opened: 18 December 1997; 28 years ago

Services
Preceding station	Osaka Metro	Following station
Yumeshima C 09 Terminus	Chūō Line	Ōsakakō C 11 towards Nagata
Terminus	Nankō Port Town Line	Trade Center-mae P 10 towards Suminoekōen
Location
- Location within Osaka Prefecture Location within Japan

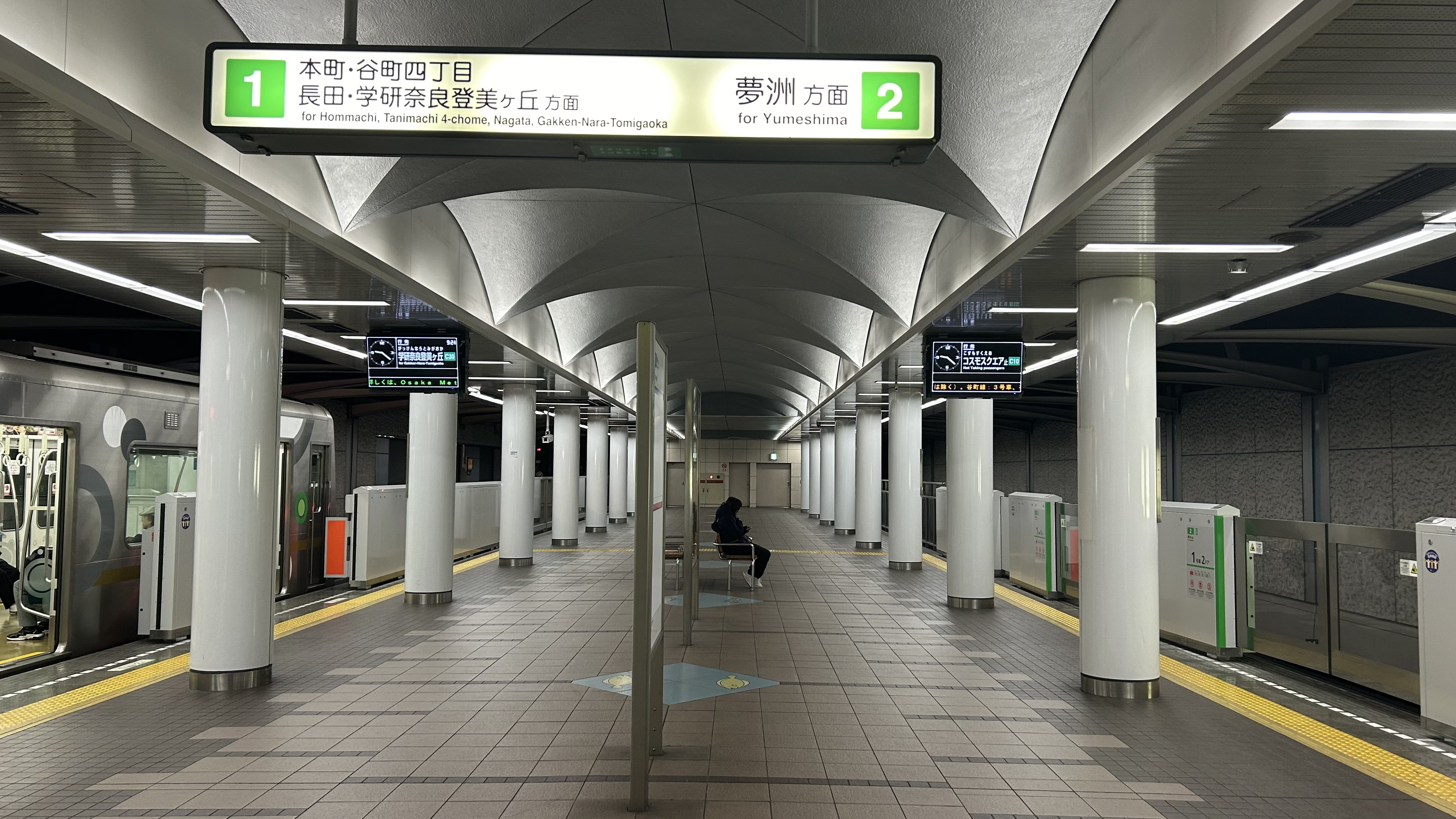
Chūō Line platform, December 2024

Cosmosquare Station (コスモスクエア駅, Kosumosukuea-eki) is a metro station on the Osaka Metro Chūō Line and Nankō Port Town Line (New Tram) in Suminoe-ku, Osaka, Japan. This station serves as the starting terminus of the Nankō Port Town Line.

== Lines ==
Osaka Metro

- Chūō Line (Station Number: C10)
- Nankō Port Town Line (Station Number: P09)

== History ==
- The station opened to rail traffic on December 18, 1997 as the then-westernmost station on the Osaka Municipal Subway network, and was managed by Osaka Port Transport System Co., Ltd.. The name "Cosmosquare" was selected in a public poll conducted in 1988 for residents of Osaka, relating to the development of "Techno Port Osaka" on the artificial islands of the Osaka Bay area.
- On July 1, 2005, Osaka Municipal Transportation Bureau took over management of the station; Osaka Metro would subsequently take over management of the station on April 1, 2018.
- A mini aquarium was installed on the subway platform at one time. Due to excessive maintenance costs and the relatively few users of the station, it was removed.
- A different train approach melody was used on the station, playing a sound similar to that of an ocean wave. On March 27, 2007, the melody was changed to the standard approach melody that is used on the metro.
- A potential extension to the artificial island of Yumeshima was first discussed in the 1990s as part of Osaka's unsuccessful bid to host the 2008 Summer Olympics. The Yumesaki Tunnel, which opened on August 1, 2009, was built with space for the Chūō Line to extend westward to Yumeshima (this segment now called the OTS North Technoport Line), which opened on 19 January 2025 in advance of Expo 2025 to be held at said site.

== Layout ==
1F	Street Level	Exit/Entrance
B1F	Mezzanine	One-way faregates, ticket/ICOCA/PiTaPa machines, station agent
B2F	Platform 3	← Nankō Port Town Line toward Nakafuto and Suminoekōen (Trade Center-mae)
B2F	Island platform, doors will open on the left/right
B2F	Platform 4	← Nankō Port Town Line toward for Nakafuto and Suminoekōen (Trade Center-mae)
B3F	Platform 1	→ Chūō Line toward Hommachi, Tanimachi Yonchome, Morinomiya, Nagata, Ikoma, and Gakken Nara-Tomigaoka (Osakako) →
B3F	Island platform, doors will open on the left
B3F	Platform 2	← Chūō Line toward Yumeshima

== Surrounding area ==
- Ancient ship Namihaya outdoor exhibit
- Cosmosquare Seaside Park and Promenade
- Intex Osaka convention center
- Kongo Gakuen international school
- Laurel Square Osaka Bay Tower
- Morinomiya University of Medical Sciences
- National Institute of Technology and Evaluation
- Osaka Bay Residence
- Osaka Prefectural Police Suminoe Police Station Nanko Cosmo kōban
- Osaka Regional Immigration Bureau Cosmosquare branch
- Port of Osaka International Ferry Terminal (for ferries to Busan and Shanghai)
- River Garden Cosmo Square
