= Suminoekōen Station =

Metro station in Osaka, Japan

Coordinates: 34°36′33″N 135°28′19″E

Suminoekoen Station 住之江公園駅
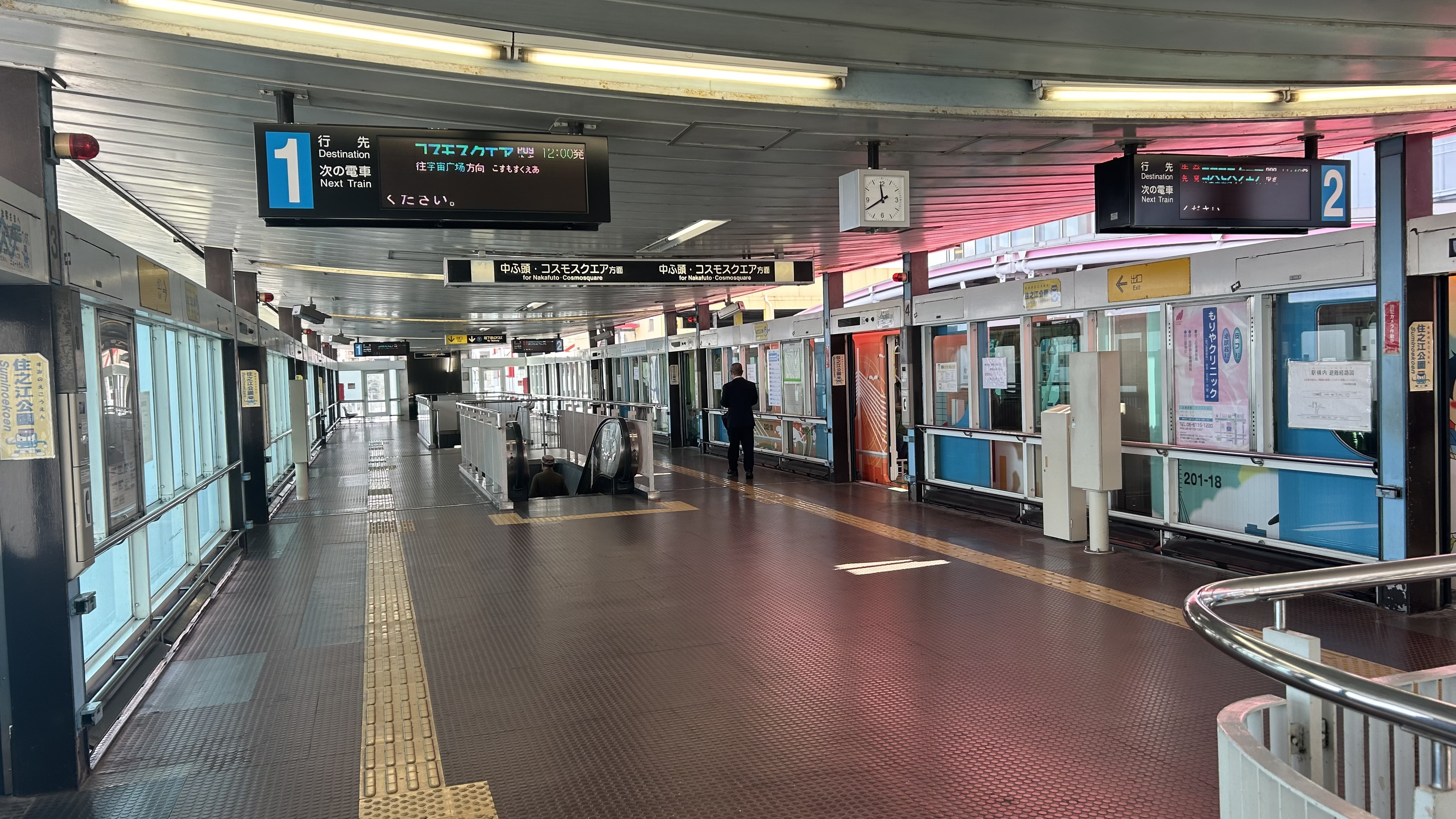
- Nankō Port Town Line platform

General information
- Location: Suminoe, Osaka, Osaka Prefecture; Japan
- System: Osaka Metro
- Operator: Osaka Metro
- Lines: Yotsubashi Line; Nankō Port Town Line
- Platforms: 2 island platforms (1 for each line)
- Tracks: 4 (2 for each line)
- Connections: Bus stop

Other information
- Station code: Y 21 P 18

History
- Opened: 9 November 1972 (Yotsubashi Line); 1981 (Nankō Port Town Line)

Passengers
- 2013: 30,137 daily

Services
Preceding station	Osaka Metro	Following station
Kitakagaya Y 20 towards Nishi-Umeda	Yotsubashi Line	Terminus
Hirabayashi P 17 towards Cosmosquare	Nankō Port Town Line	Terminus
Location
- Location within Osaka Prefecture Location within Japan

Suminoekoen Station (住之江公園駅, Suminoekōen-eki; lit. "Suminoe Park") is a railway station on the Osaka Metro Yotsubashi Line and the Nankō Port Town Line (New Tram) in Suminoe-ku, Osaka, Japan.

== Lines ==
Suminoekoen Station is served by the Yotsubashi Line (station number Y21) and Nankō Port Town Line (station number P18), and is the terminus of the both lines.

== Station layout ==
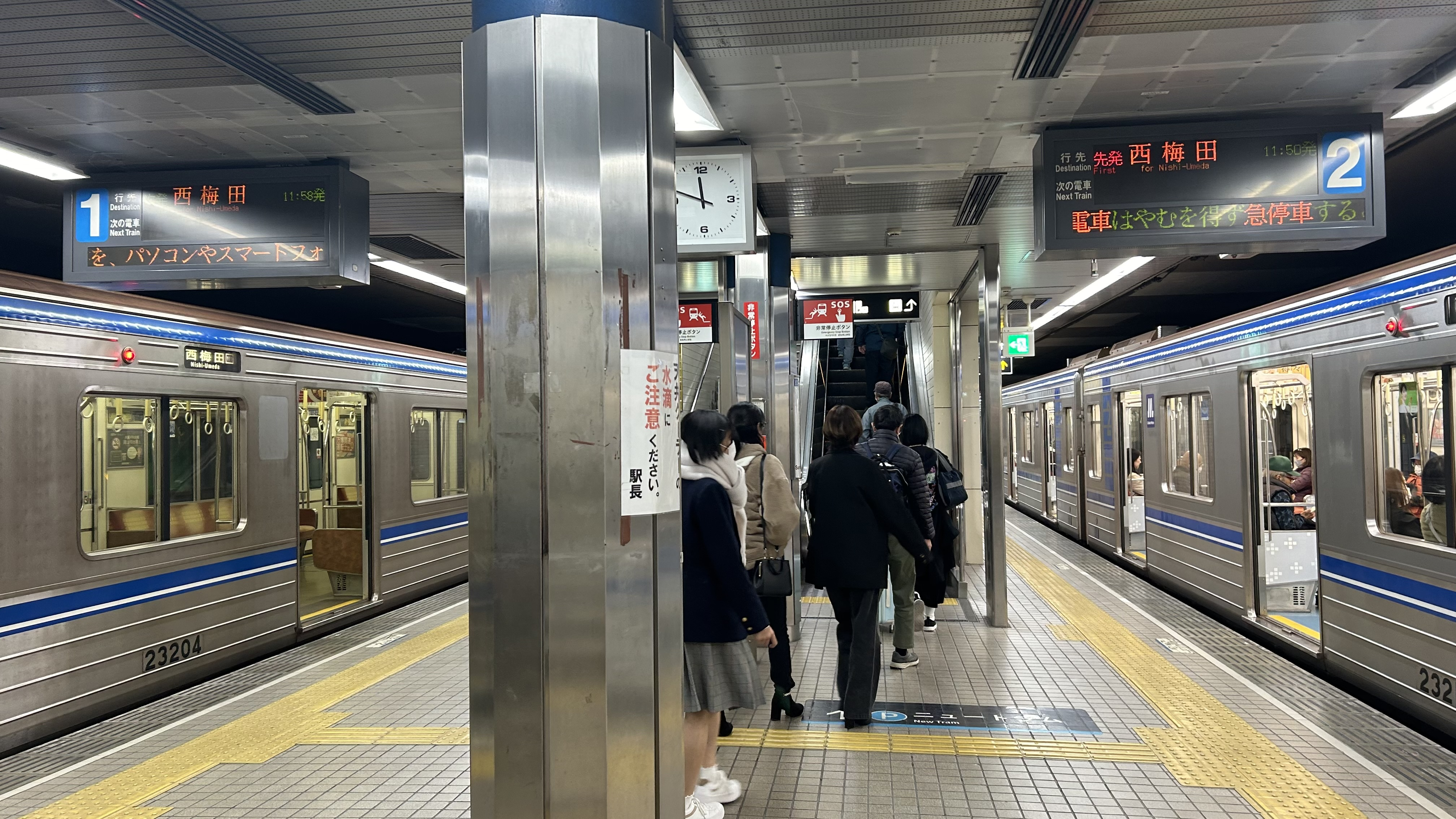
Yotsubashi Line platform

=== Yotsubashi Line ===
The station has one island platform serving two tracks located on the second basement level.

1, 2	■ Yotsubashi Line	for Daikokuchō, Namba, and Nishi-Umeda

=== Nankō Port Town Line ===
The station has one island platform serving two tracks on the second floor level.

1, 2	■ Nankō Port Town Line	for Nakafuto and Cosmosquare

== History ==
Suminoekoen Station opened on 9 November 1972.

== Surrounding area ==
- Suminoe Park
- Osaka Gokoku Shrine
- Suminoe Ward Office
- Suminoe Library
- Osker Dream building
- Osaka City Bus Terminal
- Mag's Futsal Stadium
- Boat Race Suminoe
