= Suminoe-ku =

Ward in Osaka, Japan

Coordinates: 34°36′34″N 135°28′58″E

Location of Suminoe-ku in Osaka City

Suminoe-ku (住之江区) is one of 24 wards of Osaka, Japan, stretching along the south-west border of the city. It borders the wards of Minato-ku, Taisho-ku and Nishinari-ku to the north, and Sumiyoshi-ku to the east. It has the largest land area of all the wards in Osaka, and includes about half of the Osaka Bay harbor area.

Suminoe-ku is connected to the region by three municipal subway lines (the Yotsubashi Line, the Chūō Line, and the Nankō Port Town Line), as well as two rail lines (Nankai Main Line and Hankai Line) and three expressways. The ward is also home to the Osaka international ferry terminal with services to Shikoku and Kyushu, as well as international destinations Shanghai, China, and Busan, South Korea.

== Attractions ==
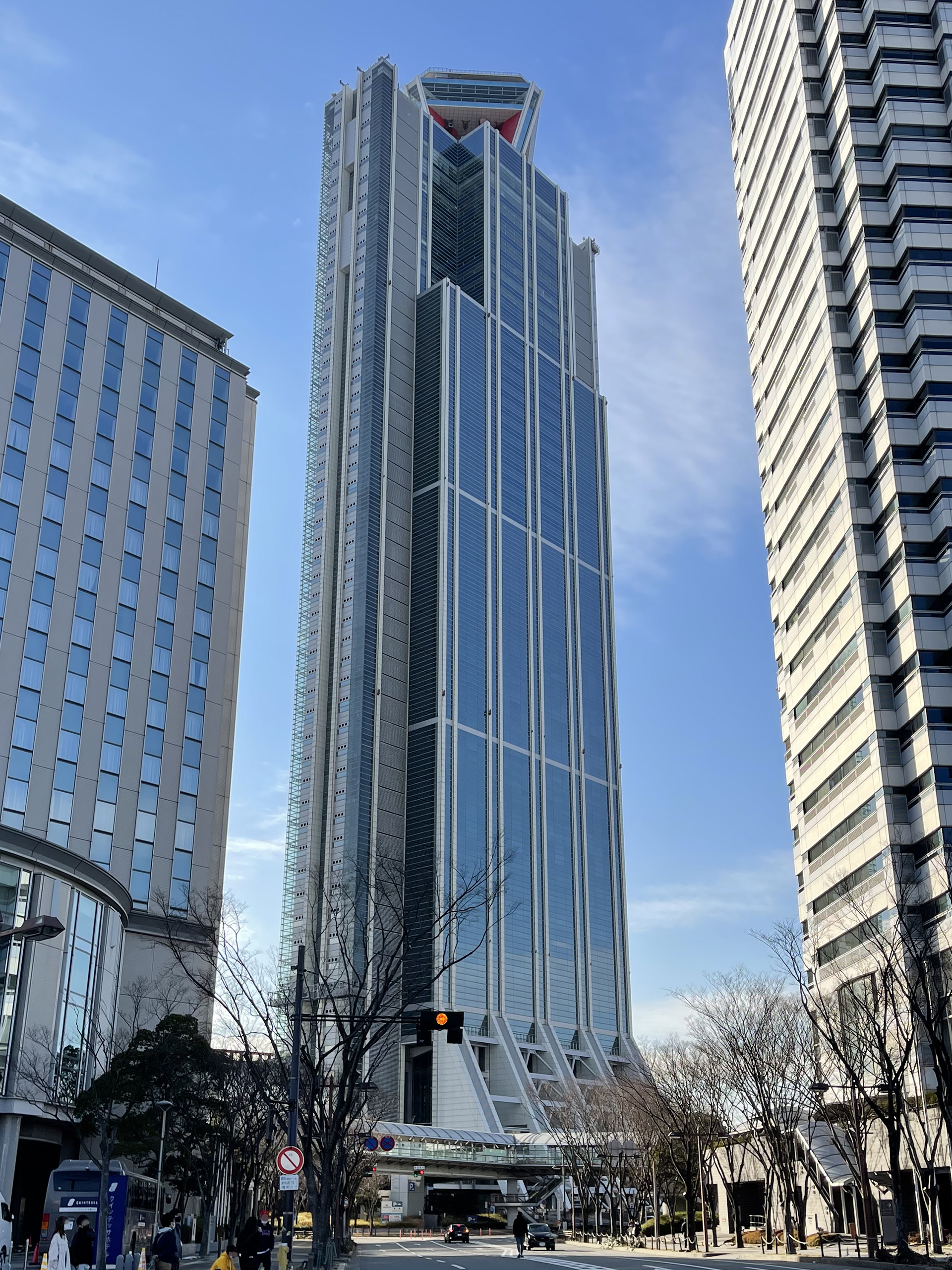
Osaka Prefectural Government Sakishima Building

Within the ward are multiple large parks, museums, international business facilities, and arts facilities.

=== Kitakagaya Creative Village ===
- A largely pre-war neighborhood, with a large concentration of galleries, artist workshops, studios, urban farms, and other creative facilities among factories and old wood-frame homes
- Chidori Bunka – a community arts and crafts complex, built inside a collection of old interconnected buildings
- Creative Center Osaka – a large dockside arts and performance complex
- Morimura@Museum – interactive arts museum by Yasumasa Morimura, a well-known contemporary Japanese artist
- The Branch Art Lab – ecological art gallery with urban garden and residency program

=== Landmarks ===
- Former Kansai Electric Nanko Power Station – former gas power plant, now decommissioned
- Intex Osaka – one of the largest conference and exhibition centers in Japan
- Osaka Prefectural Government Sakishima Building – formerly known as Osaka World Trade Center, at 256 m (840 ft) is the third tallest building in Japan, with shops, restaurants, and observation deck

=== Other galleries and museums ===
- Osaka Maritime Museum – an award-winning maritime museum, designed by architect Paul Andreu but which closed in 2013 just a decade after its opening
- Mizuno Sportology Gallery
- Wine Museum Osaka

=== Parks and recreation facilities ===
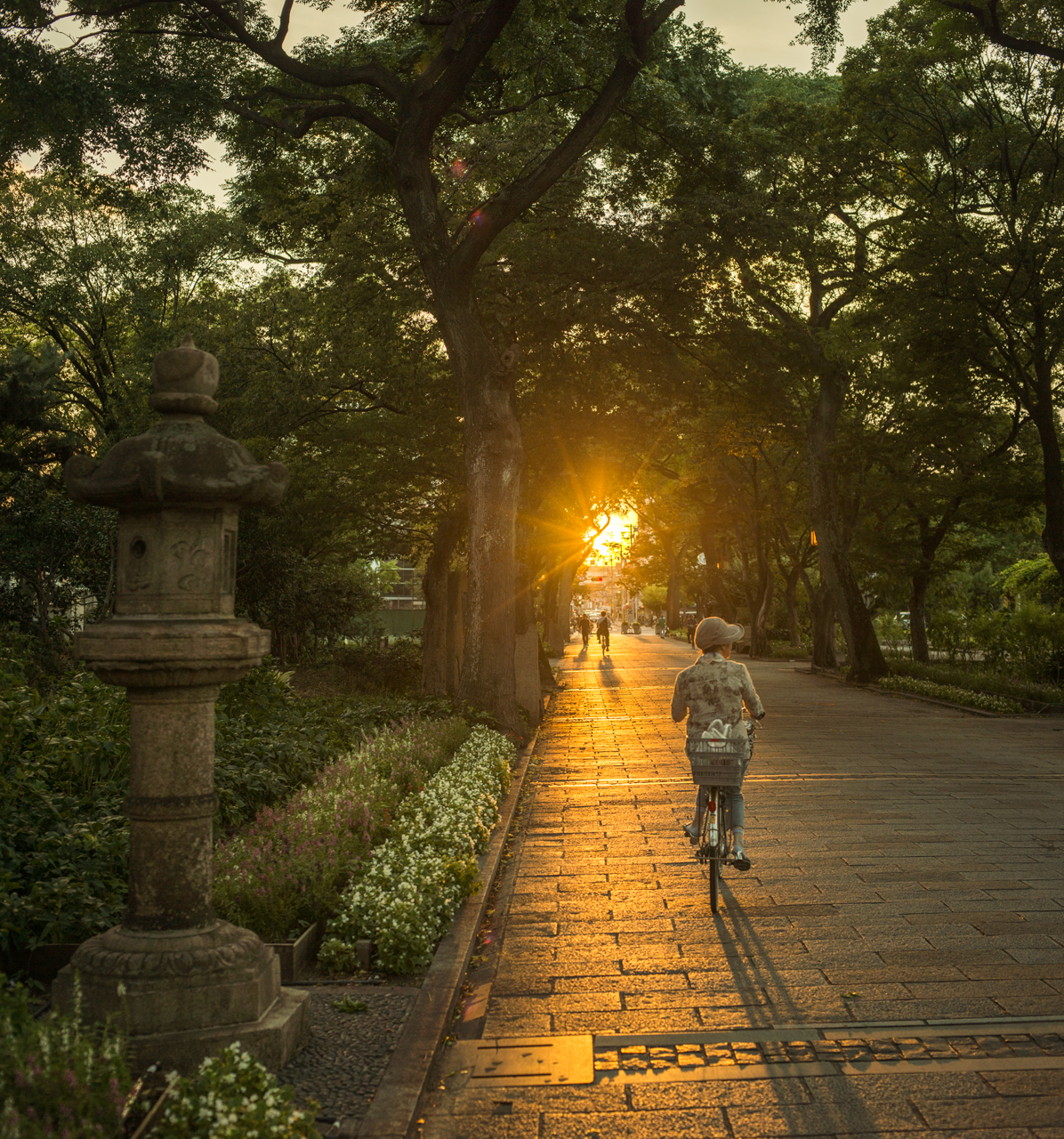
Sumiyoshi Park

- Osaka Nanko Bird Sanctuary – 19-hectare wetland park serving as a stopover point for migratory birds coming from as far as Siberia and New Zealand, with public observation towers
- Sumiyoshi Park – opened in 1873, a storied park that is the oldest in Osaka City
- Suminoe Park

=== Shopping and entertainment ===
- Asia & Pacific Trade Center – large international trade complex and shopping mall
- Zepp Osaka music hall

== Education ==
International schools:

- Kongo Gakuen, a South Korean school
- South Osaka Korean Elementary School (南大阪朝鮮初級学校), a North Korean school

== Notable people ==
- Ai Otsuka (born 1982) – J-pop singer-songwriter, illustrator and pianist on Avex
- Yusuke Maruhashi (born 1990) – Japanese footballer
- Soichiro Fujitaka (born 1991) – basketball player
