= 日本橋駅 =

日本橋駅 may refer to:

- Nihonbashi Station
- Nipponbashi Station
  - Kintetsu Nipponbashi Station
