= Ogimachi =

Ogimachi may refer to:

- Emperor Ōgimachi, the 106th Emperor of Japan
- Ōgimachi Station (Osaka), a station of the Sakaisuji Line of Osaka Municipal Subway
- Ōgimachi Station (Kanagawa), a station of the JR Tsurumi Line
- Ogimachi Village, included in Historic Villages of Shirakawa-gō and Gokayama
