= Nagahoribashi Station =

Metro station in Osaka, Japan

Coordinates: 34°40′28.73″N 135°30′22.76″E

Nagahoribashi Station 長堀橋駅
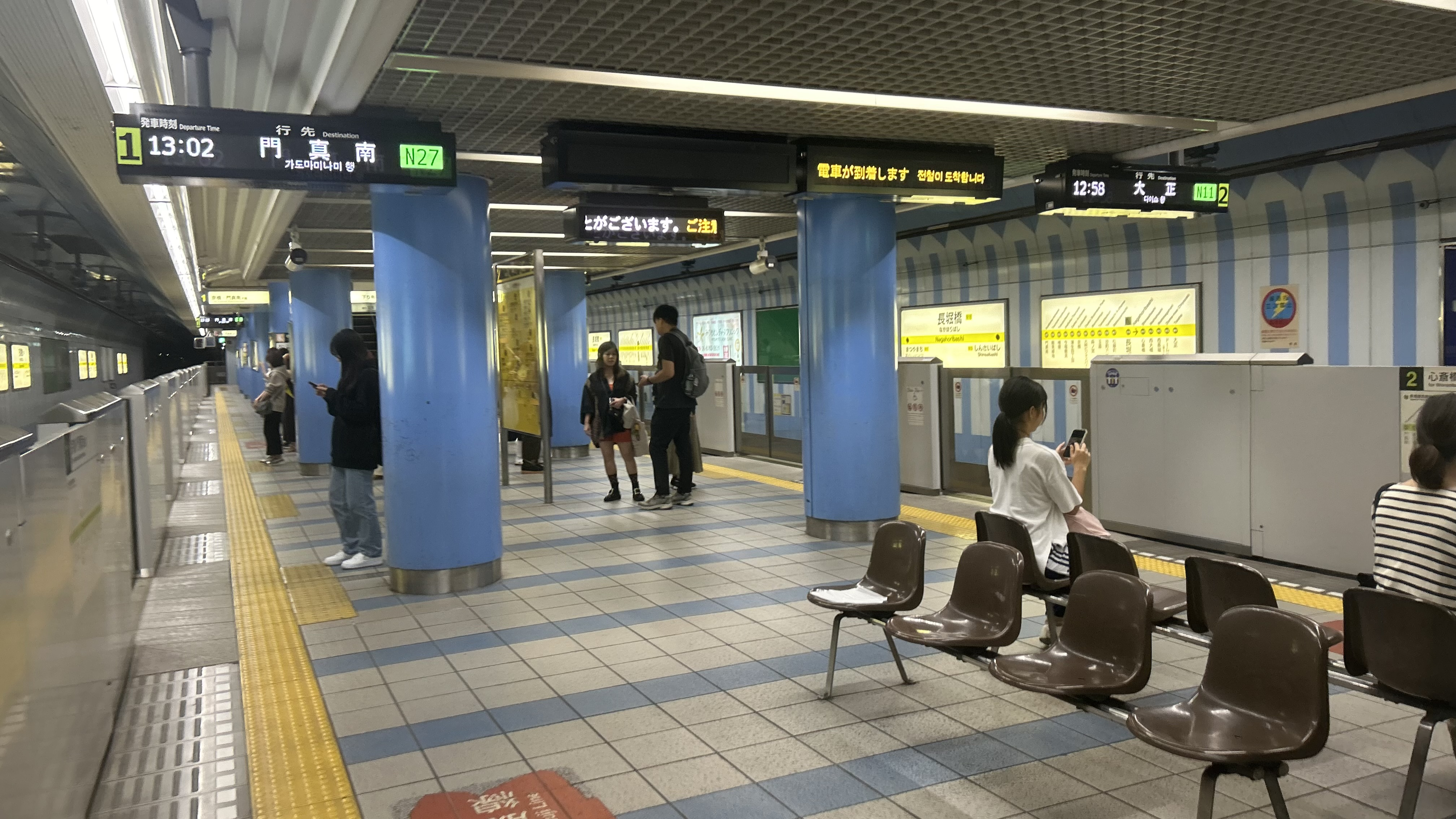
- Nagahori Tsurumi-ryokuchi Line platform

General information
- Location: Osaka; Japan
- System: Osaka Metro
- Operator: Osaka Metro
- Lines: Sakaisuji Line; Nagahori Tsurumi-ryokuchi Line
- Platforms: 2 island platforms (1 for each line)
- Tracks: 4 (2 for each line)

Construction
- Structure type: Underground

Other information
- Station code: K 16 N 16

History
- Opened: 1969 (Sakaisuji Line); 1996 (Nagahori Tsurumi-ryokuchi Line)

Services
| Preceding station | Osaka Metro | Following station |
|---|---|---|
| Sakaisuji-Hommachi K 15 towards Tenjimbashisuji Rokuchōme | Sakaisuji Line | Nippombashi K 17 towards Tengachaya |
| Shinsaibashi N 15 towards Taishō | Nagahori Tsurumi-ryokuchi Line | Matsuyamachi N 17 towards Kadoma-minami |
Location
- Location within Osaka Prefecture Location within Japan

Nagahoribashi Station (長堀橋駅, Nagahoribashi-eki) is a railway station on the Osaka Metro in Chūō-ku, Osaka, Japan. It is very close to Shinsaibashi Station, within a five-minute walk.

== Lines ==
- Osaka Metro
  - Sakaisuji Line (K16)
  - Nagahori Tsurumi-ryokuchi Line (N16)

== Layout ==
- Platform for each line is an island platform with two tracks.
- The platform for the Nagahori Tsurumi-ryokuchi Line is fenced with platform gates.

Sakaisuji Line

| 1 | ■ Sakaisuji Line | for Nippombashi, Dobutsuen-mae and Tengachaya |
| 2 | ■ Sakaisuji Line | for Tenjimbashisuji Rokuchome, Kita-Senri and Takatsuki-shi |

Nagahori Tsurumi-ryokuchi Line

| 1 | ■ Nagahori Tsurumi-ryokuchi Line | for Morinomiya, Kyobashi and Kadomaminami |
| 2 | ■ Nagahori Tsurumi-ryokuchi Line | for Shinsaibashi and Taisho |

== Around the station ==
- Crysta Nagahori

== Stations next to Nagahoribashi ==
| « | Service | » |
Osaka Metro
Sakaisuji Line (K16)
| Sakaisuji-Hommachi (K15) | Local | Nippombashi (K17) |
| Sakaisuji-Hommachi (K15) | Semi-Express | Nippombashi (K17) |
Extra Limited Express "Hozu": Does not stop at this station
