= Hankyu 1300 series =

Japanese train type

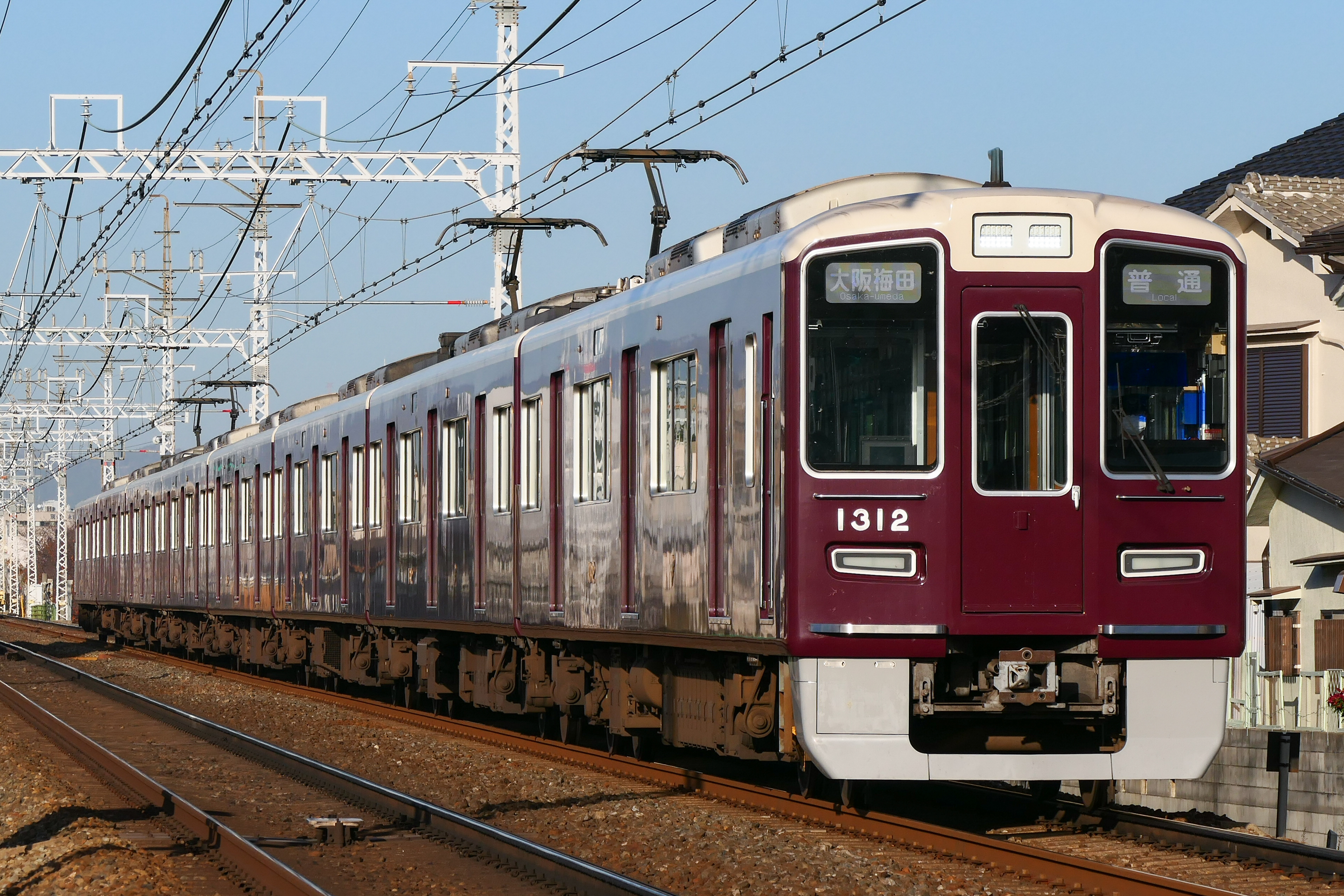
- Set 1312, December 2023
- In service: 2014 – present
- Manufacturer: Hitachi
- Built at: Kudamatsu, Yamaguchi
- Family name: A-train
- Replaced: 2300 series, 3300 series, 5300 series
- Entered service: 30 March 2014
- Number built: 128 vehicles (16 sets)
- Number in service: 128 vehicles (16 sets)
- Formation: 8 cars per trainset
- Fleet numbers: 1300–1315
- Capacity: 1,044 per set
- Operators: Hankyu Railway
- Lines served: Kyoto Main Line; Senri Line; Osaka Metro Sakaisuji Line

Specifications
- Car body construction: Aluminium alloy, double-skin
- Car length: 18,900 mm (62 ft 0 in)
- Width: 2,825 mm (9 ft 3.2 in)
- Height: 4,095 mm (13 ft 5.2 in)
- Doors: 3 pairs per side
- Maximum speed: 115 km/h (71 mph) (service); 130 km/h (81 mph) (design)
- Traction system: Variable frequency (IGBT)
- Traction motors: Squirrel-cage rotors
- Acceleration: 2.6 km/(h⋅s) (1.6 mph/s)
- Deceleration: 3.7 km/(h⋅s) (2.3 mph/s) (service); 4.2 km/(h⋅s) (2.6 mph/s) (emergency)
- Electric system(s): 1,500 V DC
- Current collection: Pantograph
- Bogies: FS579M (motored), FS579T (trailer)
- Braking system(s): Electronically controlled pneumatic brakes with regenerative braking
- Safety system(s): ATS, WS-ATC
- Coupling system: Shibata
- Track gauge: 1,435 mm (4 ft 8 1/2 in)

The Hankyu 1300 series (阪急電鉄1300系, Hankyū 1300-kei) is a commuter electric multiple unit (EMU) train type operated by the private railway operator Hankyu Corporation on Hankyu Kyoto Main Line services since March 2014.

== Overview ==
Based on the 9000 series and 9300 series EMUs first introduced in 2003, the 8-car 1300 series trains are manufactured by Hitachi and have aluminium alloy bodies with a double-skin construction. Externally, the trains are finished in the standard Hankyu colour scheme of all-over maroon.

== Formation ==
The eight-car trains are formed as shown below, with four motored (M) cars and four non-powered trailer (T) cars, and car 1 at the Umeda end.

Designation	Tc	M	M'	T	T	M	M'	Tc
Numbering	1300	1800	1900	1350	1450	1850	1950	1400
Weight (t)	30.0	35.3	33.6	27.2	27.2	35.3	33.6	30.0
Capacity (Total/seated)	123/43	133/49	133/49	133/49	133/49	133/49	133/49	123/43

The "M" cars (1800 and 1850) each have two single-arm pantographs.

== Interior ==
Passenger accommodation consists of longitudinal bench seating throughout, with "golden olive" coloured moquette seat covers. Internally, the trains use LED lighting throughout. Each car includes a wheelchair space at one end.

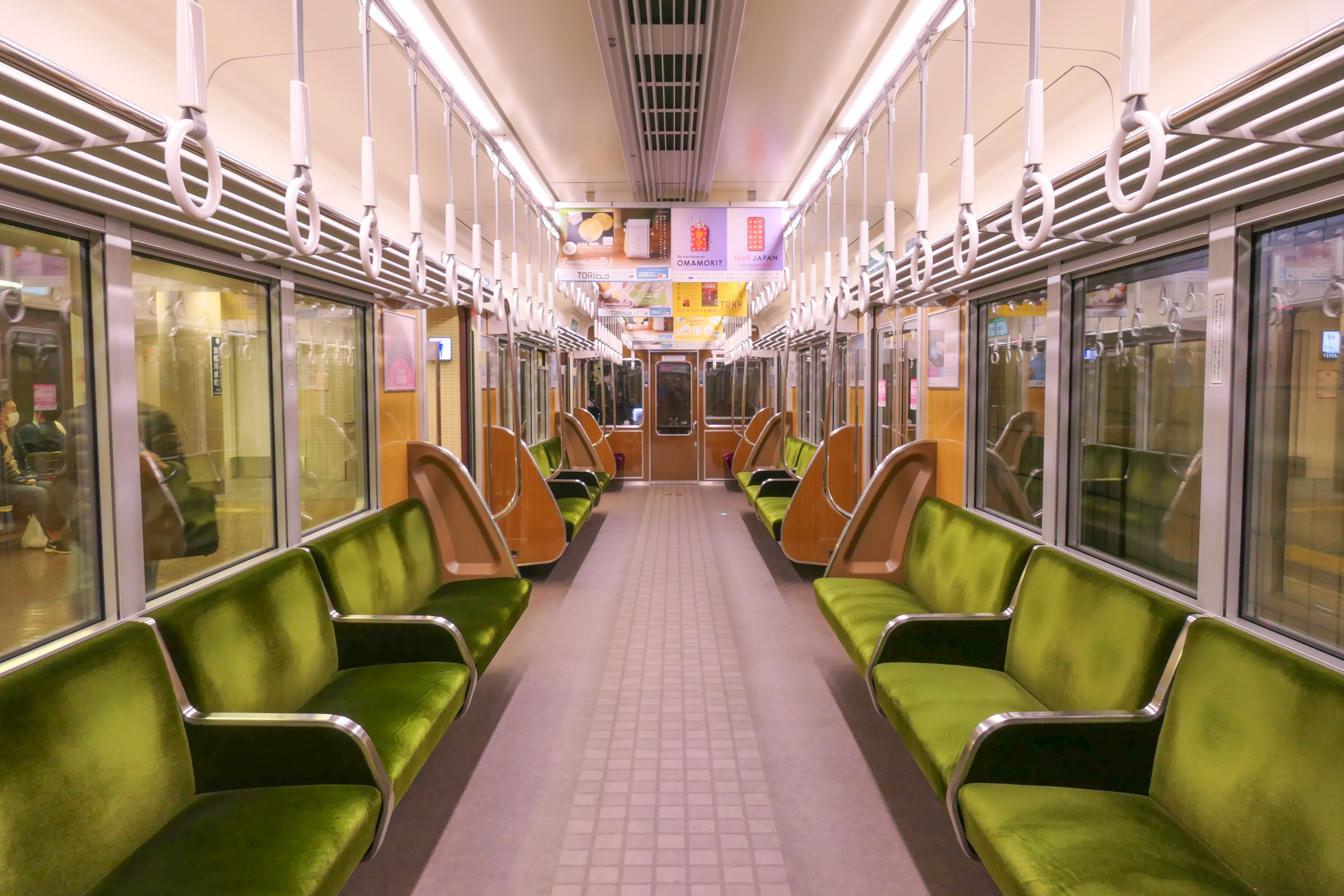
Interior view

== History ==
The first set, 1300, entered revenue service from 30 March 2014.

As of July 2022, 16 8-car sets were built.

== Fleet history ==
The fleet history is as shown below.

Set No.	Date delivered
1300	28 March 2014
1301	March 2014
1302	September 2014
1303	January 2015
1304	February 2016
1305	2016
1306	December 2016
1307	July 2018
1309	August 2019
1310	2020
1311	2020
1312	2020
1313	2021
1314	2022
1315	2022

== See also ==
- Hankyu 1000 series, a similar variant used on the Kobe/Takarazuka Lines from November 2013
