= Ogimachi Station =

Ogimachi Station (扇町駅) is the name of two train stations in Japan:

- Ōgimachi Station (Kanagawa)
- Ōgimachi Station (Osaka)
