= JEX Co.,Ltd. =

Japanese total medical supply enterprise

JEX Co., Ltd. ジェクス株式会社
- Company type: Public
- Industry: Chemical
- Founded: Osaka, Japan (1960)
- Headquarters: 2-3-12, Tanimachi, Chuo-ku, Osaka, Japan
- Key people: Yujiro Kajikawa, (CEO)
- Products: Medicines, Medical appliances, Cosmetics, Child care goods, Household commodities, and so on.
- Total assets: JPY 300 million
- Number of employees: 200
- Website: JEX Co., Ltd.

JEX Co., Ltd. (ジェクス株式会社, Jekusu Kabushiki-gaisha) is a Japanese total medical supply enterprise that treats the medical supply and sanitary items such as condoms. Headquartered in Chuo-ku, Osaka, Japan. The company was founded on December 7, 1960.

== Outline ==
A manufacturer that chiefly handles condom for sanitary items and family planning and medical supplies such as lubrication jellies and ED measures commodities. Moreover, the brand that treats baby goods "CHUCHUBABY" is possessed (Describe it later about the CHUCHUBABY). A lubrication jelly (Jelia skin) was developed first domestically, and the name of Nihon-Jelia industrial place. The name of the company is changed to Jex at the same time as advancing to the baby business in 1972. Absorption has amalgamated the CHUCHUBABY by the business integration in 2004 though the CHUCHUBABY is established as related companies in 1997. It consists of five businesses (LOVERS (sanitary items and condom, etc.), WOMAN (Health & beauty and jelly of the character pleasure, etc.), senior (senior life caring product, so-called ED measures,), baby&mother (baby goods), and medical (medical treatment articles)).

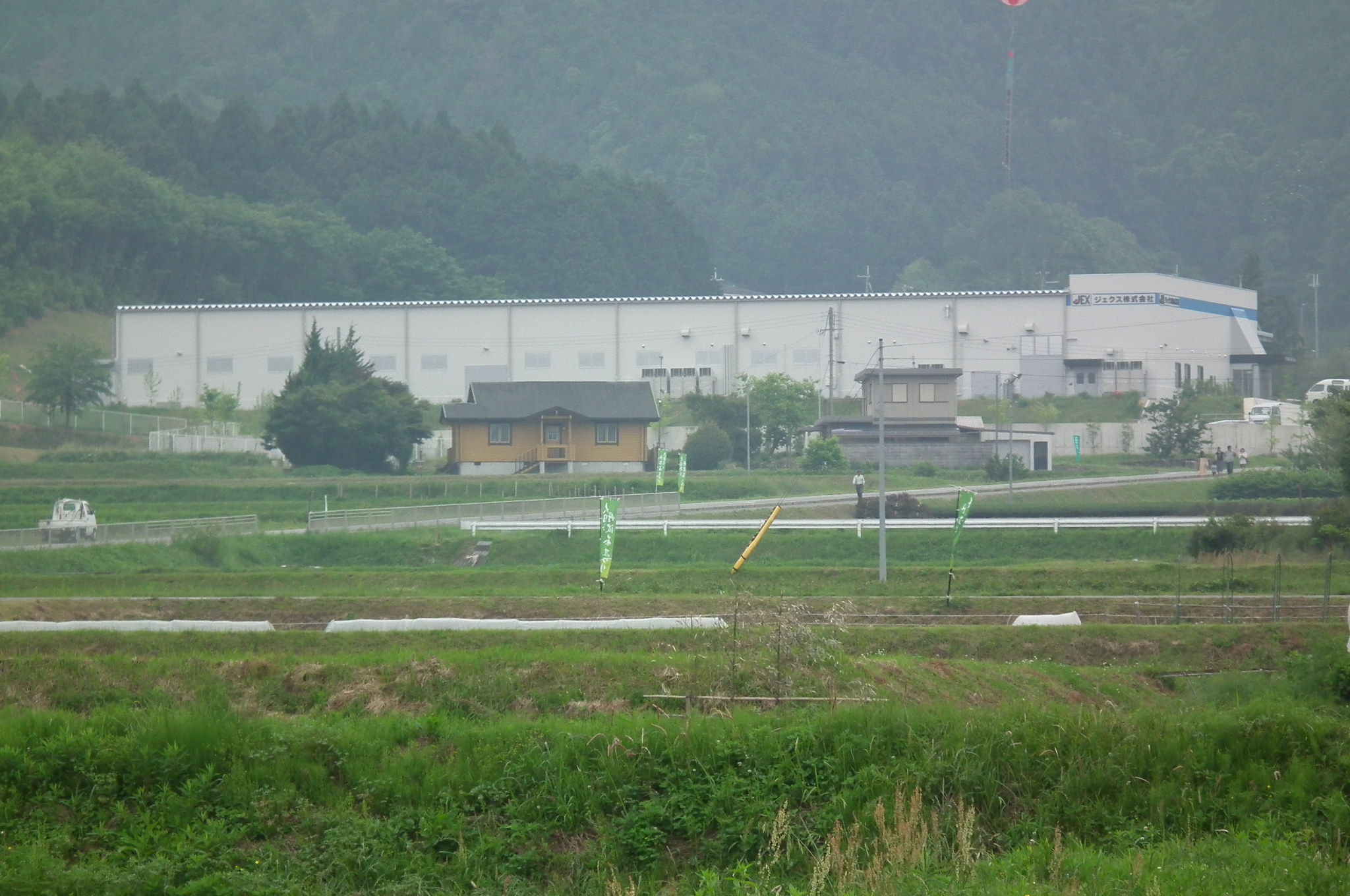
Sasayama-Ajima Factory

== CHUCHUBABY ==
Baby and maternity business that started in 1972. The number of items increases from the latter half of the 1980s though the first commodity is only a nursing bottle and a nipple. Penguin's design has a wide commodity group like tablewares, bath oil, and the skin care creams, etc. from the detergent for various babies in the trademark. The management integration is done again in 2004 though it became independent as related companies in 1997. URL on the website becomes independent, and is considered so that it is not easy to be linked with the website of Jex.

== Products ==
=== Condoms ===
- Usu usu
- Usui
- Dot the Dot
- Hot cap
- Honey cap
- Glamorous Butterfly
- Strong
- XOXO Condom

=== Jelly ===
- Lubejelly
- Dr.G
- JELLY PLUS+

=== Nursery item / CHUCHU series ===
- Nursing bottle, nipple, and milking machine, and so on.

=== Maternity articles ===
- Mama's undergarment
- Mother's milk putt

=== Product for medical institution ===
- Projelly
- Procover
- Proskin
- Healing cool foam
- Healing cool Jel
- Healing hot jel
- Jex meter
- Tsukerudake
- Etak

== Headquarters ==
- 2-3-12, Tanimachi, Chuo-ku, Osaka, Japan
