= Osaka Jogakuin Junior College =

Private junior college in Chūō-ku, Osaka, Japan

Coordinates: 34°40′35.4″N 135°31′37.72″E

- 大阪女学院短期大学
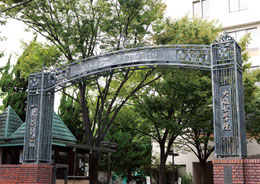
- Type: Private
- Established: 1968
- Location: Chūō-ku, Osaka, Osaka Prefecture, Japan
- Website: www.wilmina.ac.jp/ojc/2yrs

Osaka Jogakuin Junior College (大阪女学院短期大学, Ōsaka Jogakuin Tanki Daigaku) is a private junior college in Chūō-ku, Osaka, Japan. It was established in 1968. It has been attached to Osaka Jogakuin College since 2004.
