= Ogimachi Station (Osaka) =

Metro station in Osaka, Japan

K 12 Ōgimachi Station 扇町駅
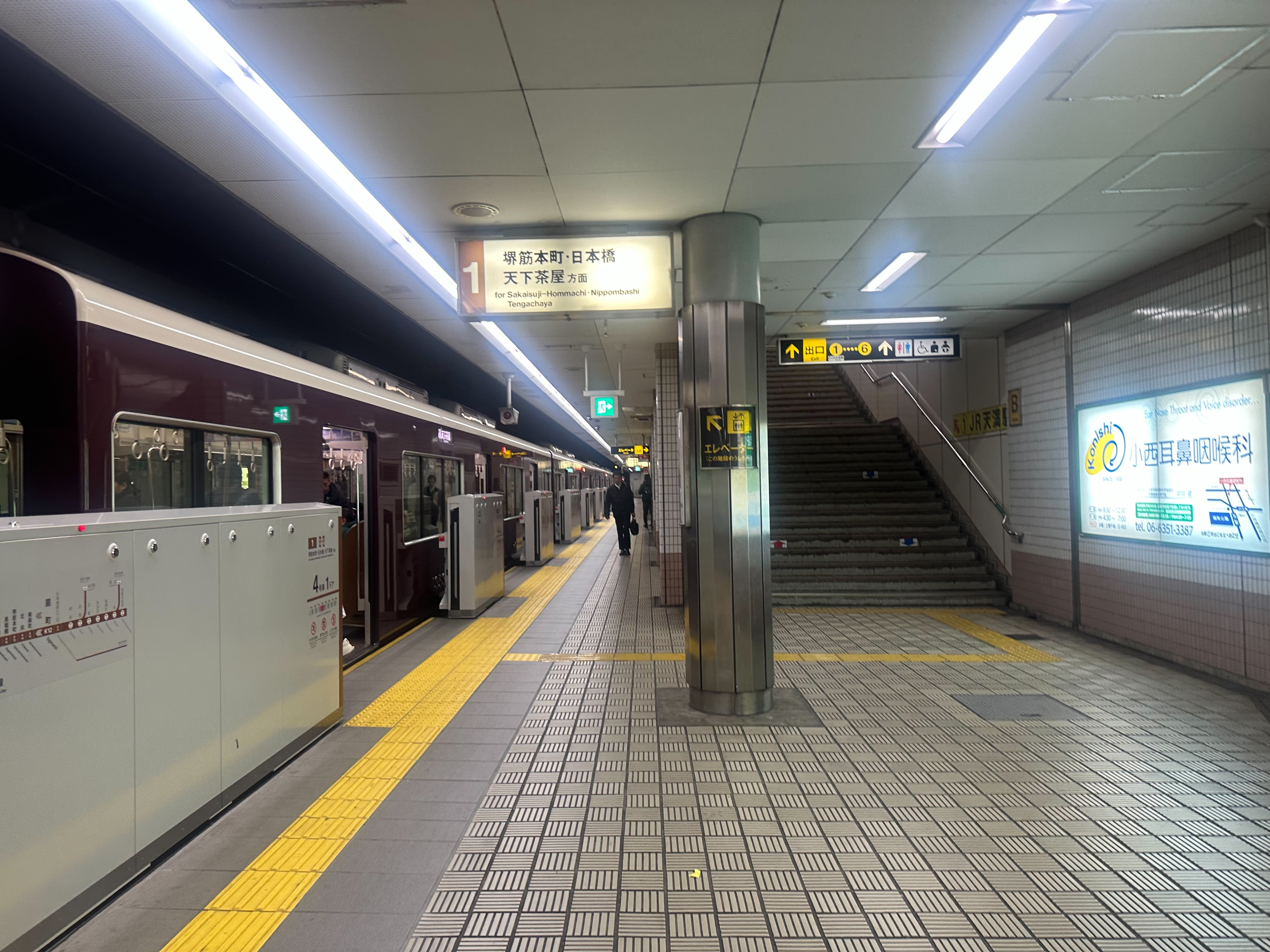
- Ogimachi Station platform, December 2024

General information
- Location: Tenjimbashi Yonchome, Kita, Osaka, Osaka （大阪市北区天神橋四丁目） Japan
- Coordinates: 34°42′13.71″N 135°30′39″E
- Operator: Osaka Metro
- Line: Sakaisuji Line
- Platforms: 2 side platforms
- Tracks: 2
- Connections: JR West Osaka Loop Line at Temma

Construction
- Structure type: Underground

Other information
- Station code: K 12

History
- Opened: 6 December 1969; 56 years ago

Services
Preceding station	Osaka Metro	Following station
Tenjimbashisuji Rokuchōme K 11 Terminus	Sakaisuji Line	Minami-morimachi K 13 towards Tengachaya
Location
- Location within Osaka Prefecture Location within Japan

Ōgimachi Station (扇町駅, Ōgimachi-eki; K12) is a metro station on the Osaka Metro Sakaisuji Line in Kita-ku, Osaka, Osaka Prefecture, Japan.

== Layout ==
- There are two side platforms with two tracks on the second basement.

1	■ Sakaisuji Line	for Sakaisuji-Hommachi, Nippombashi and Tengachaya
2	■ Sakaisuji Line	for Tenjimbashisuji Rokuchome, Awaji, Kita-Senri and Takatsuki-shi

== Surroundings ==
- Temma Station (Osaka Loop Line)
- Kita Ward Office, Osaka
- Tenjimbashisuji Shopping Arcade
- Kids Plaza Osaka
- Kansai Telecasting Corporation

=== Buses ===
Ōgimachi (Osaka City Bus)
- Route 37 for Itakano Shako-mae / for Osaka-ekimae (Osaka Station north side)
- Route 83 for Hanahaku-kinen-koen kitaguchi / for Osaka-ekimae (Osaka Station north side)
- Route 78 for Moriguchi Shako-mae / for Osaka-ekimae (Osaka Station north side)

== Stations next to Ogimachi ==
«	Service	»
Osaka Metro Sakaisuji Line K12
Tenjimbashisuji Rokuchome K11	Local	Minami-morimachi K13
Tenjimbashisuji Rokuchome K11	Semi-Express	Minami-morimachi K13
Extra Limited Express "Hozu": Does not stop at this station
