= Sakaisuji-Hommachi Station =

Metro station in Osaka, Japan

Sakaisuji-Hommachi Station 堺筋本町駅
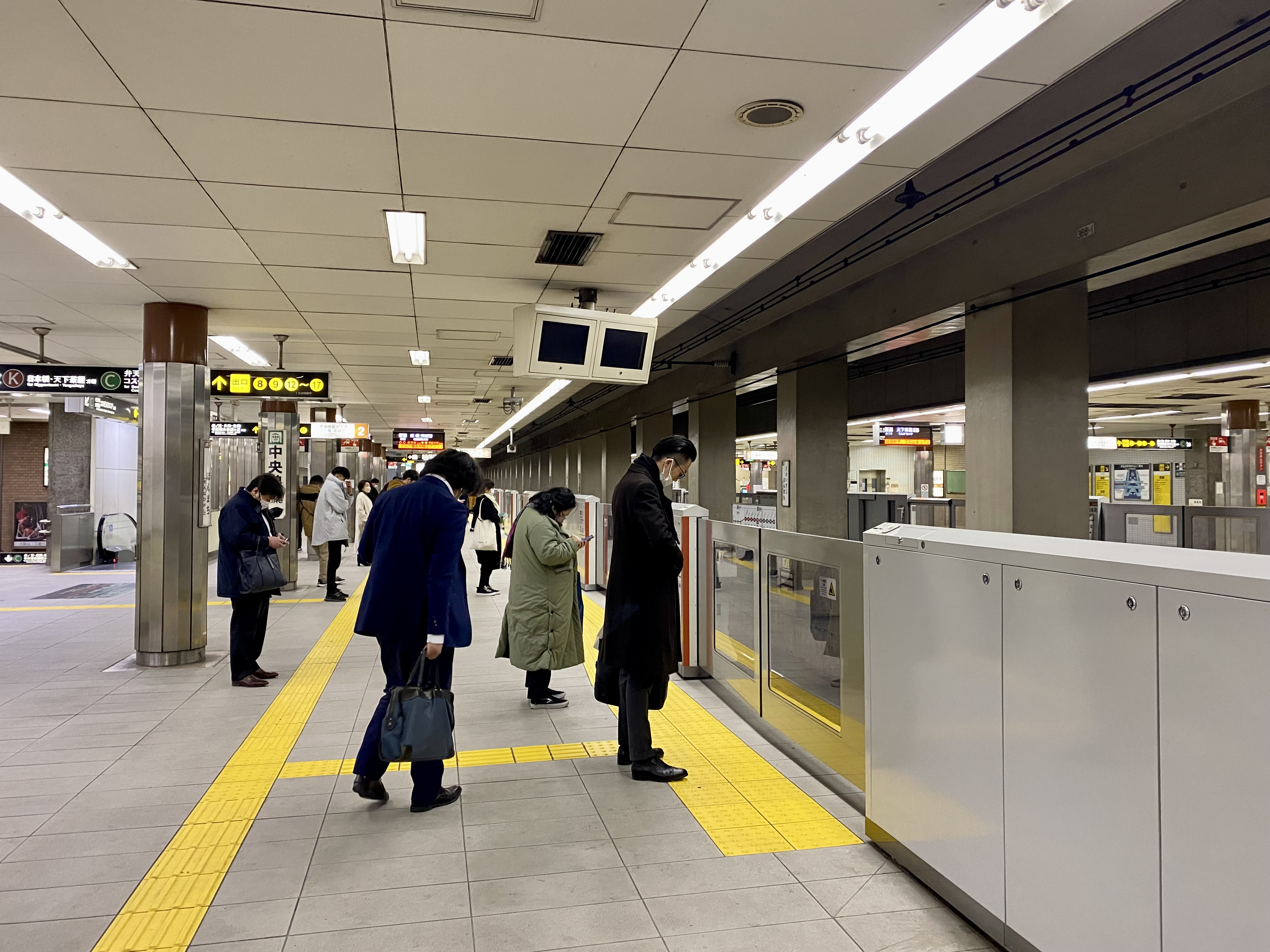
- Platform 2 for the Sakaisuji Line

General information
- Other names: Semba-higashi
- Location: 1-4-16 Semba-Chūō, Chūō-ku, Osaka-shi, Osaka; Japan
- Coordinates: 34°40′54.70″N 135°30′24.88″E
- System: Osaka Metro
- Operator: Osaka Metro
- Lines: Sakaisuji Line; Chūō Line
- Platforms: 1 island platform (Chūō line); 2 side platforms (Sakaisuji Line)
- Tracks: 4 (2 for each line)
- Connections: Bus stop

Other information
- Station code: K 15 C 17

History
- Opened: 6 December 1969; 56 years ago

Services
Preceding station	Osaka Metro	Following station
Kitahama K 14 towards Tenjimbashisuji Rokuchōme	Sakaisuji Line	Nagahoribashi K 16 towards Tengachaya
Hommachi C 16 towards Yumeshima	Chūō Line	Tanimachi Yonchōme C 18 towards Nagata
Location
- Location within Japan

Sakaisuji-Hommachi Station (堺筋本町駅, Sakaisuji-Honmachi-eki) is a railway station on two lines of the Osaka Metro in Chūō-ku, Osaka, Japan.

== Lines ==
Sakaisuji-Hommachi Station is served by the following two Osaka Metro lines:

- Sakaisuji Line (K15)
- Chūō Line (C17)

== Layout ==
The station has two side platforms serving two tracks for the Sakaisuji Line on the second basement, between the third and fourth buildings of Semba Center Building, and an island platform serving two tracks for the Chuo Line under the Sakaisuji Line. The platform for the Chuo Line is about 40 m wide because it is located under the second basement floor of Semba Center Building.

"Semba-higashi (船場東)" has been shown on the station signs since October 2011 to revive the traditional "Semba Brand" in the center of the city of Osaka. "Semba-nishi (船場西)" is shown on the station signs at adjacent Hommachi Station.

=== Sakaisuji Line platforms ===
1	■ Sakaisuji Line	for Nippombashi, Dobutsuen-mae, and Tengachaya

2	■ Sakaisuji Line	for Tenjimbashisuji Rokuchome, Kita-Senri, and Takatsuki-shi

=== Chūō Line platforms ===
1	■ Chūō Line	for Tanimachi Yonchome, Nagata, Ikoma, and Gakken Nara-Tomigaoka
2	■ Chūō Line	for Bentencho, Osakako, and Yumeshima

== History ==
The station opened on 6 December 1969.

== Surrounding area ==
- Chuo Ward Office
- Osaka Prefectural Police Higashi Police Station
- Teijin
- Marubeni
- Semba Center Building
- Mydome Osaka
- The Osaka Chamber of Commerce and Industry
- Hanshin Expressway Route 1 Loop Line
- Hanshin Expressway Route 13 Higashi-Osaka Line
