= Osaka Municipal Subway 66 series =

Japanese electric multiple unit train type

Osaka Municipal Subway/Osaka Metro 66 series
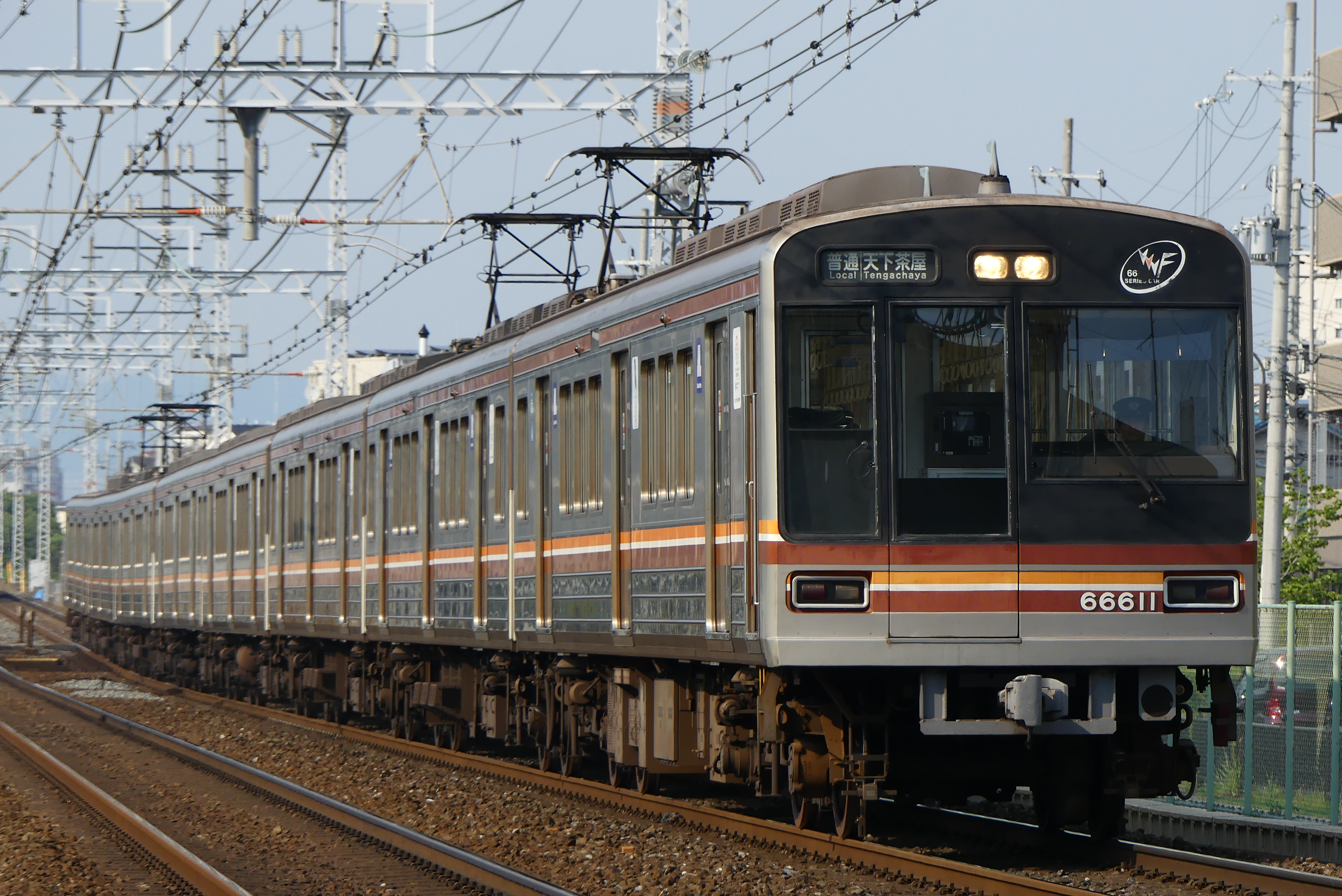
- 66611 on a service to Tengachaya
- In service: 1990–present
- Manufacturer: Kawasaki Heavy Industries, Kinki Sharyo
- Replaced: 60 series
- Constructed: 1990–2003
- Entered service: 1 August 1990
- Refurbished: 2012–2023
- Number built: 136 vehicles (17 sets)
- Number in service: 136 vehicles (17 sets)
- Formation: 8 cars per trainset
- Fleet numbers: 66601–66617
- Operators: Osaka Municipal Subway (1990–2018); Osaka Metro (2018–)
- Lines served: Sakaisuji Line; Hankyu Kyoto Line; Hankyu Senri Line

Specifications
- Car body construction: Stainless steel
- Car length: 18,900 mm (62 ft 0 in)
- Width: 2,845 mm (9 ft 4.0 in)
- Height: 4,080 mm (13 ft 5 in)
- Doors: 3 pairs per side
- Maximum speed: 70 km/h (43 mph) (Sakaisuji Line); 110 km/h (68 mph) (Hankyu Lines)
- Traction system: Variable-frequency
- Traction motors: Squirrel-cage three-phase induction motor
- Power output: 180 kW (241 hp)
- Acceleration: 2.8 km/(h⋅s) (1.7 mph/s)
- Deceleration: 3.5 km/(h⋅s) (2.2 mph/s) (service); 4.0 km/(h⋅s) (2.5 mph/s) (emergency)
- Electric system(s): 1,500 V DC overhead wire
- Current collector(s): Pantograph
- Bogies: SS-120 / SS-020
- Braking system(s): Electric commanding brake with regenerative brake
- Safety system(s): WS-ATC, Hankyu ATS
- Track gauge: 1,435 mm (4 ft 8 1/2 in)

The Osaka Municipal Subway/Osaka Metro 66 series (大阪市交通局・大阪メトロ66系) is a rapid transit electric multiple unit (EMU) train type operated by Osaka Municipal Subway in Japan since 1990.

== Overview ==
Seventeen eight-car sets were built to replace the older 60 series sets on the Sakaisuji Line.

The first 12 sets (96 cars) were built in 1990 while an expansion of 40 cars (5 sets) were introduced between 2002 and 2004.

== Formations ==
The Sakaisuji Line fleet consists of 17 eight-car trainsets formed as follows, with car 1 at the Tengachaya end.

	← Tengachaya Tenjimbashisuji 6-chōme →							
Car No.	1	2	3	4	5	6	7	8
Designation	Tec1	Ma1	Mb1	Tp'	T'	Mb2	Ma2	Tec2
Numbering	666xx	660xx	661xx	667xx	668xx	663xx	662xx	669xx

- The "Ma1" and "Ma2" cars are each fitted with two scissors-type pantographs.

== Interior ==
Passenger accommodation consists of longitudinal seating throughout.

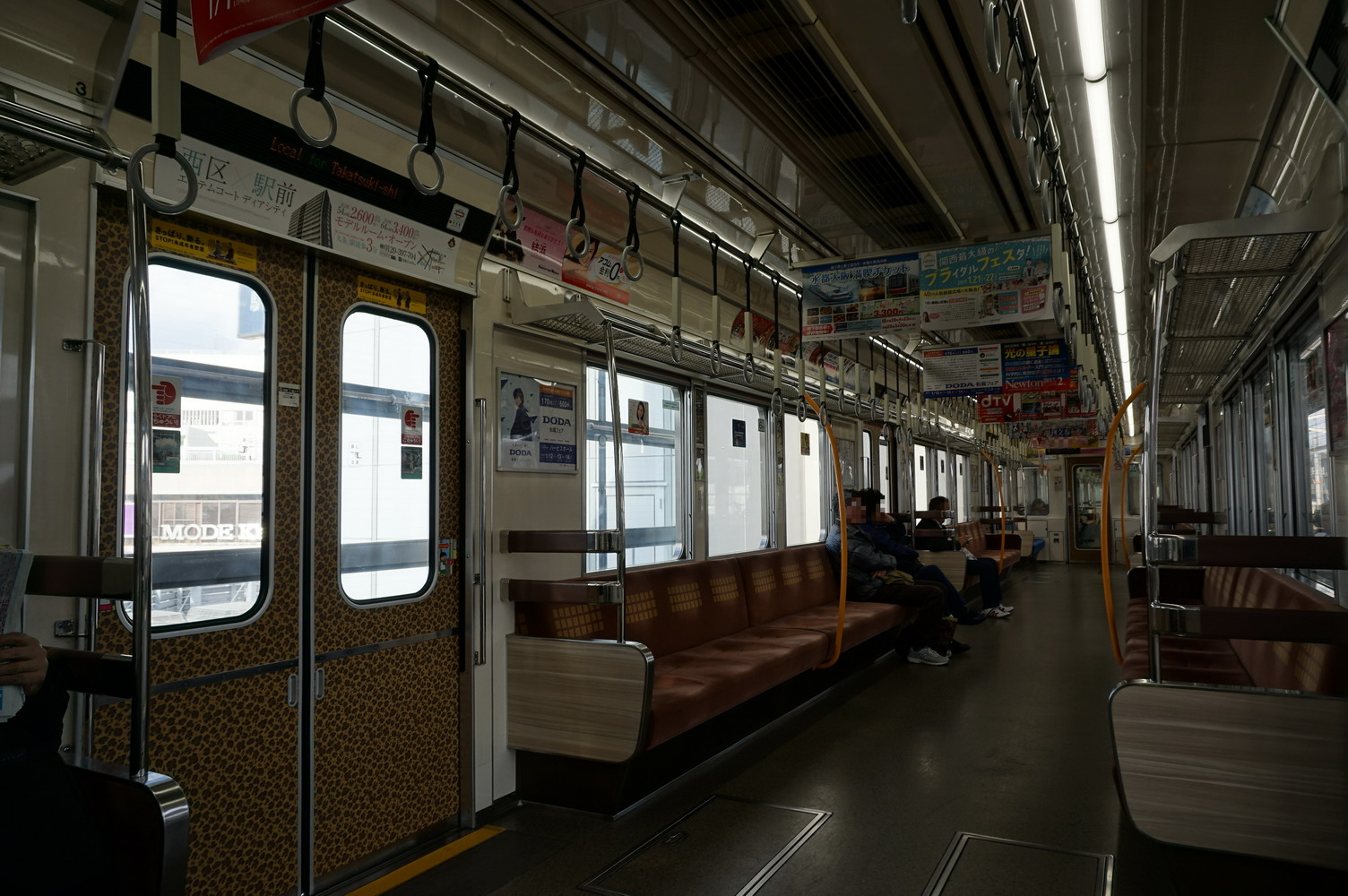
Interior of a "Tec1" car

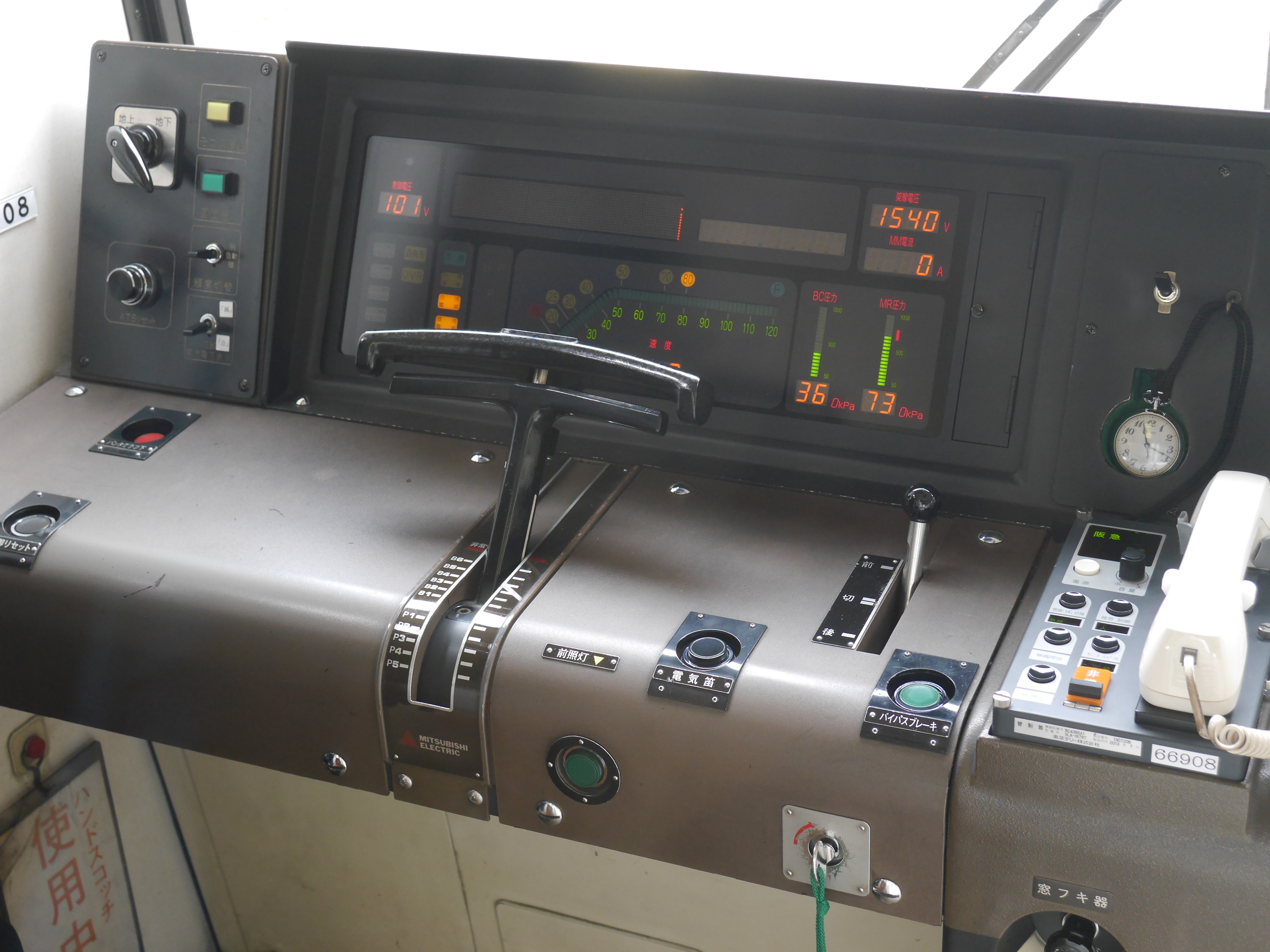
Drivers cabin of "Tec2" car 66908

== History ==
The trains started to undergo refurbishment in 2012. Set 66605 was the first train to be refurbished. It returned to service in February 2013. Works included a new paint scheme, various installations of LED displays and lights, and the installation of a front skirt.

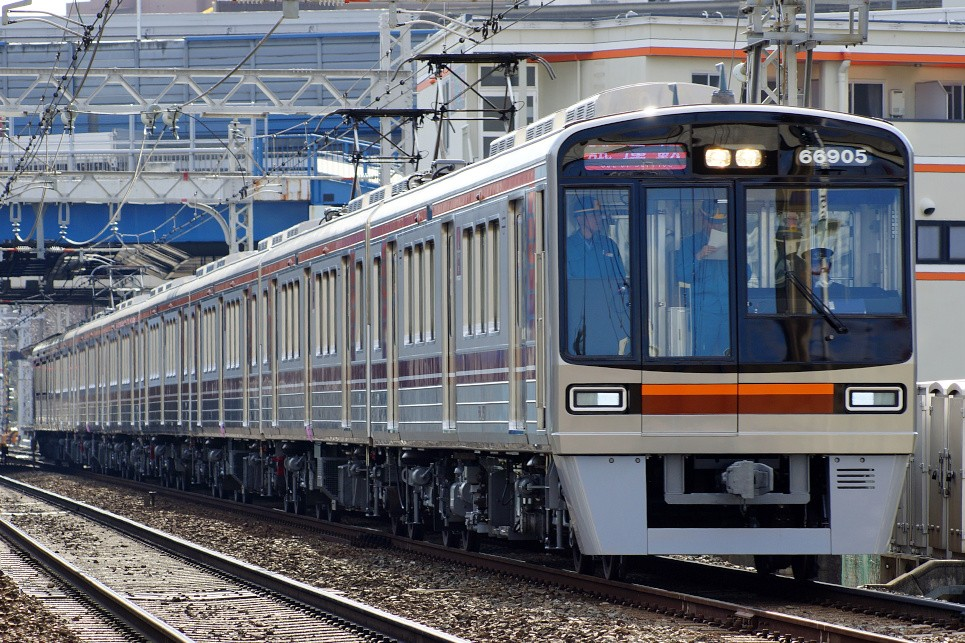
Refurbished set 66605 in January 2013
