= Kintetsu Nippombashi Station =

Railway station in Osaka, Japan

Kintetsu Nippombashi Station 近鉄日本橋駅
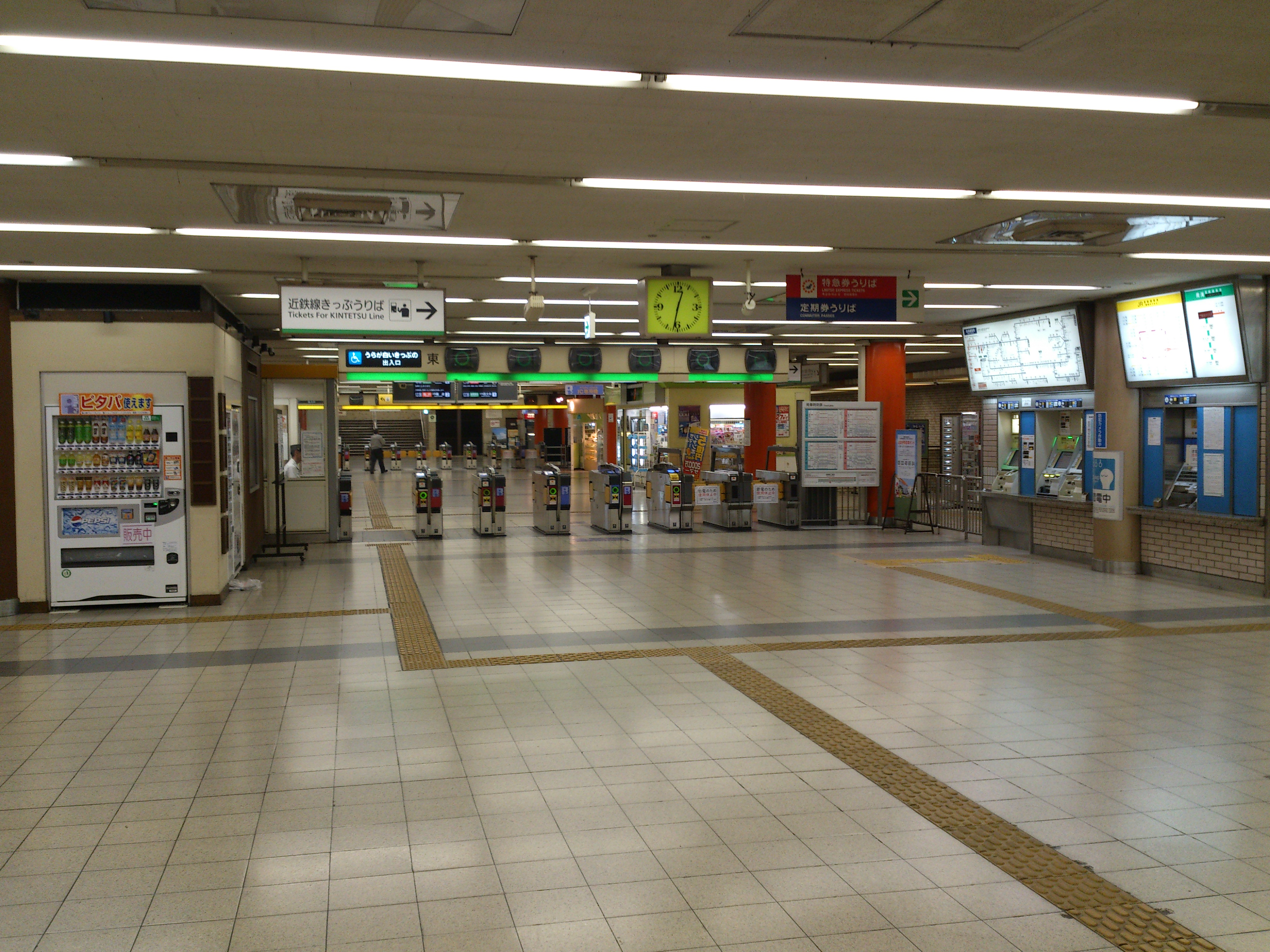
- East gate

General information
- Location: 1-18-14, Nippombashi, Chuo, Osaka, Osaka （大阪府大阪市中央区日本橋一丁目18-14） Japan
- Coordinates: 34°40′1.02″N 135°30′20.94″E
- Operator: Kintetsu Railway
- Line: Kintetsu Namba Line
- Platforms: 2 side platforms
- Tracks: 2
- Connections: Osaka Metro via transfer at Nippombashi: Sennichimae Line; Sakaisuji Line

Construction
- Structure type: Underground

Other information
- Station code: A02

History
- Opened: 1970

Passengers
- November 13, 2012: 45,920 daily

Services
Preceding station	Kintetsu Railway	Following station
Ōsaka Namba Terminus	Kintetsu Namba Line Local Semi-Express Suburban Semi-Express Express Rapid Express	Ōsaka Uehommachi Terminus
Location

Kintetsu-Nippombashi Station (近鉄日本橋駅, Kintetsu-Nipponbashi Eki) is a railway station on the Kintetsu Namba Line in Nippombashi Itchome, Chūō-ku, Osaka, Japan. Trains of the Nara Line arrive at and depart from the station.

== Lines ==
- Namba Line
- Osaka Metro (Nippombashi Station)
  - Sakaisuji Line (K17)
  - Sennichimae Line (S17)

== Layout ==
This station has 2 side platforms serving a track each on the third basement. Two ticket gates on the second basement are opened from the first train until the last train. There is a ticket gate called "Niji Gate" on the first basement, connecting to Namba Walk. Entrances are located on the first basement near ticket gates of Nippombashi Station operated by Osaka Metro.

1	■ Namba Line; Nara Line	eastbound for Higashi-Hanazono, Ikoma, Yamato-Saidaiji and Nara; Connection at Yamato-Saidaiji for Tenri
2	■ Namba Line	westbound to Osaka Namba for Amagasaki, Koshien and Kobe Sannomiya via the Hanshin Namba Line

- Passengers should change trains at Osaka Uehommachi or Tsuruhashi for the Osaka Line.
