= Temma Station =

Railway station in Osaka, Japan

Coordinates: 34°42′17.76″N 135°30′43.69″E

Temma Station 天満駅
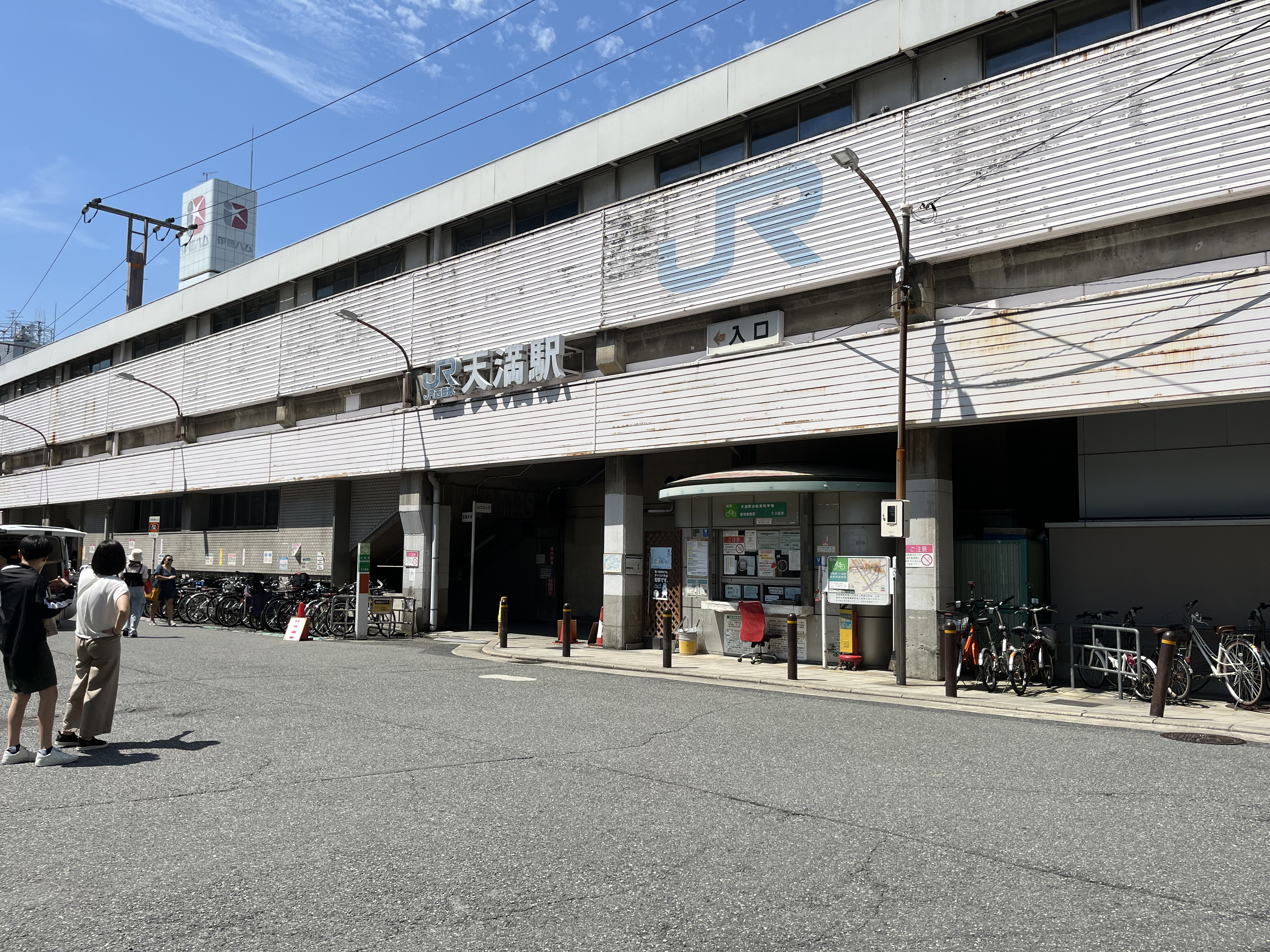
- Station entrance (June 2006)

General information
- Operator: JR West
- Line: O Osaka Loop Line
- Platforms: 2
- Tracks: 2
- Connections: Sakaisuji Line at Ogimachi

Other information
- Station code: JR-O10

History
- Opened: 1895
Location

Temma Station (天満駅, Tenma-eki) is a railway station on the Osaka Loop Line in Osaka, Osaka Prefecture, Japan.

== Layout ==
- There are an island platform and a side platform with two tracks elevated.

1	■ Osaka Loop Line	inner track for Ōsaka and Nishikujō
2	■ Osaka Loop Line	outer track for Kyōbashi and Tsuruhashi

== Surrounding area ==
- Ogimachi Station (Sakaisuji Line)
- Kita Ward Office, Osaka
- Tenjimbashisuji Shopping Arcade
- Kids Plaza Osaka
- Kansai Telecasting Corporation

== History ==
Station numbering was introduced in March 2018 with Temma being assigned station number JR-O10.

== Adjacent stations ==
«	Service	»
West Japan Railway Company (JR West) Osaka Loop Line
Sakuranomiya	All types	Osaka
