= Osaka Jogakuin Junior and Senior High School =

- 大阪女学院中学校・高等学校
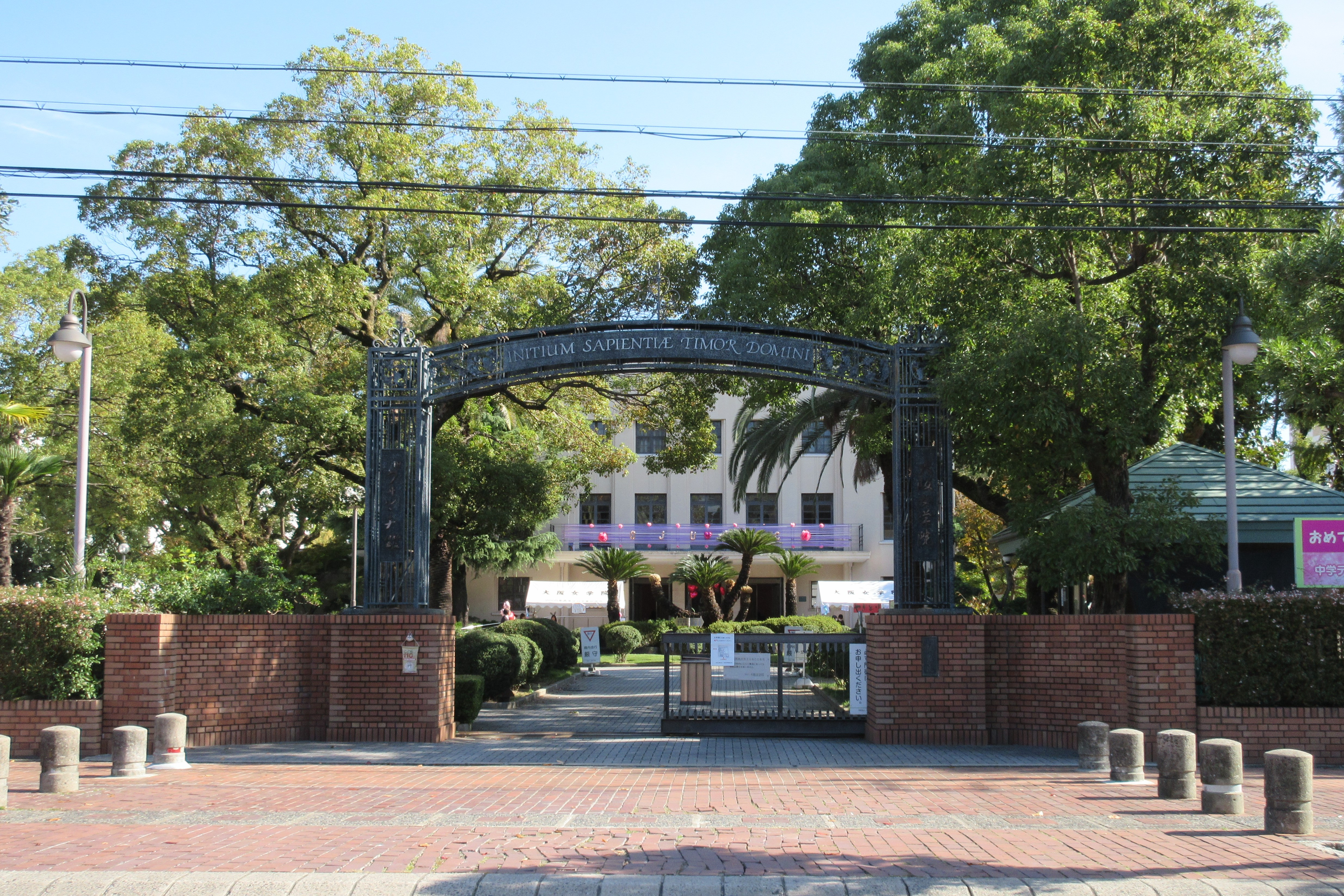
- Main gate

Location
- Chuo-ku, Osaka; Japan; 34.6774°N 135.5272°E

Information
- Type: Private School
- Religious affiliation: Protestant
- Denomination: Presbyterianism
- Established: 7 January 1884
- Grades: 7 - 12
- Gender: Female
- Language: Japanese
- Website: www.osaka-jogakuin.ed.jp

Osaka Jogakuin Junior and Senior High School (大阪女学院中学校・高等学校, Ōsaka Jogakuin Chūgakkō Kōtōgakkō) is a private Christian girls' junior and senior high school in Tamatsukuri, Chuo-ku, Osaka.

Missionaries from the Cumberland Presbyterian Church in the United States established the school in 1884. As of 2019 it had a total of 1,330 students; its junior high division had 512 students and its senior high division had 818 students.

== Notable alumna ==
- Keiko Kitagawa, actress
- Kumiko Sato, figure skater
- Noriko Oda, figure skater
- Hiromi Kobayashi, synchronized swimmer
- Kim Chae-hwa, Zainichi Korean figure skater
- Midori Naka, stage actress
- Tomiko Itooka, supercentenarian.
- Riko Fukumoto, actress
