= Chūō-ku, Osaka =

Ward in Osaka, Japan

Coordinates: 34°40′52″N 135°30′35″E

Chūō-ku, Osaka 中央区
- Wards
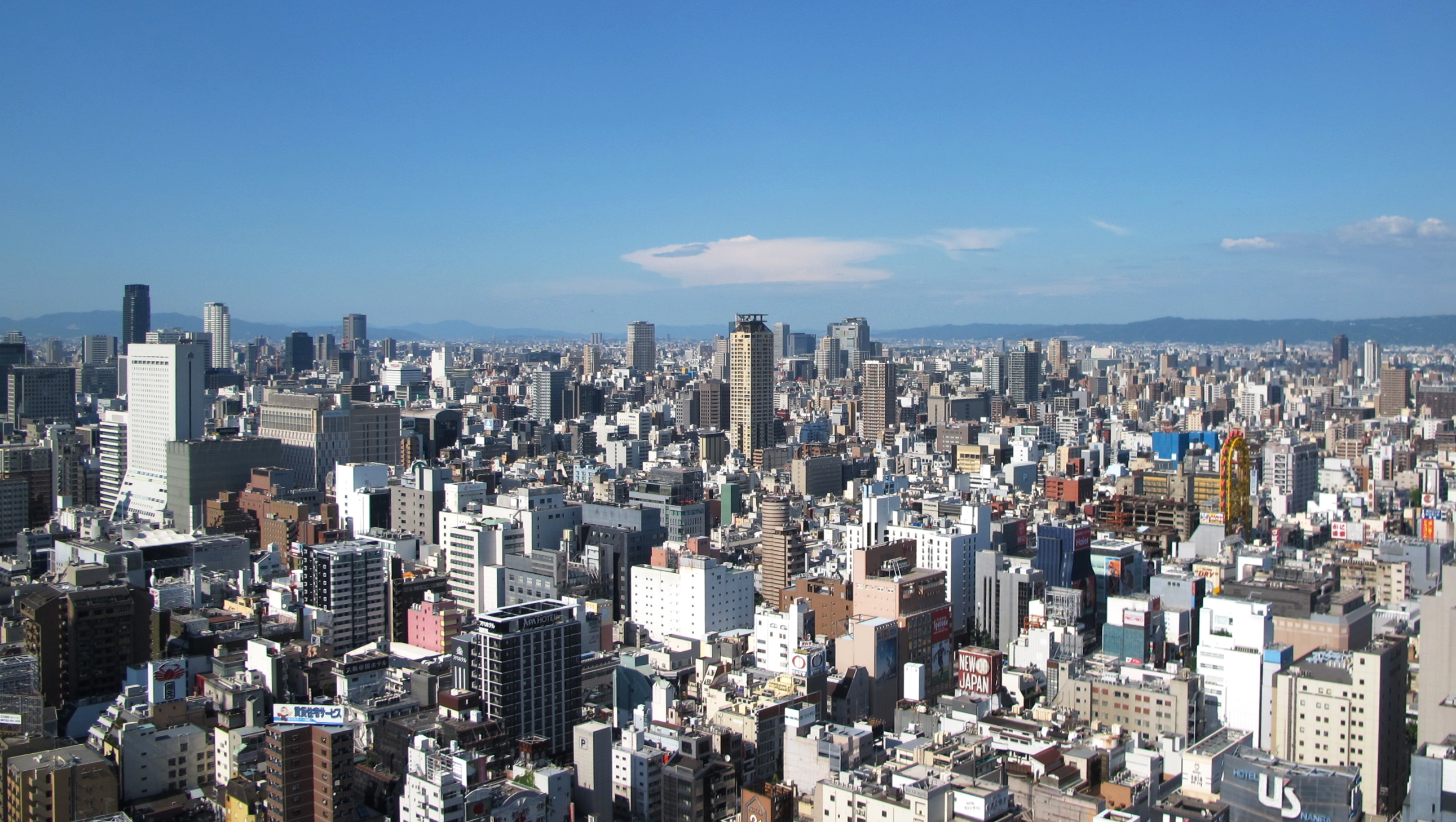
- Skyline in 2013

- Location within Osaka City

- Location of Chūō-ku, Osaka
- Sovereign state: Japan
- Region: Kansai
- Prefecture: Osaka Prefecture
- City: Osaka
- Established: 1989

Area
  - Total: 8.87 km^{2} (3.42 sq mi)

Population
  - Total: 109,249
  - Density: 12,317/km^{2} (31,900/sq mi)
- Time zone: UTC+9 (JST)
- ISO 3166-2: JP-27
- Website: Official website

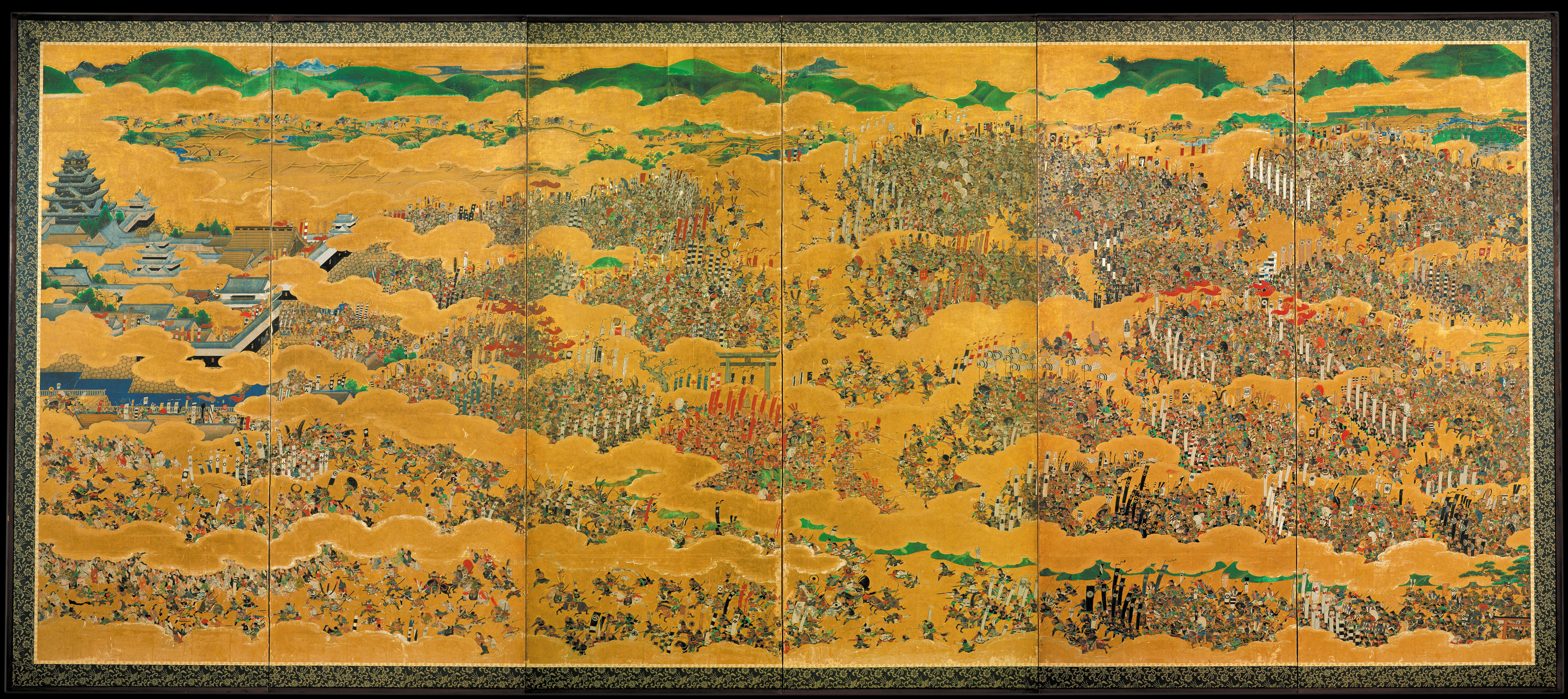
The Siege of Osaka Castle, 17th century.

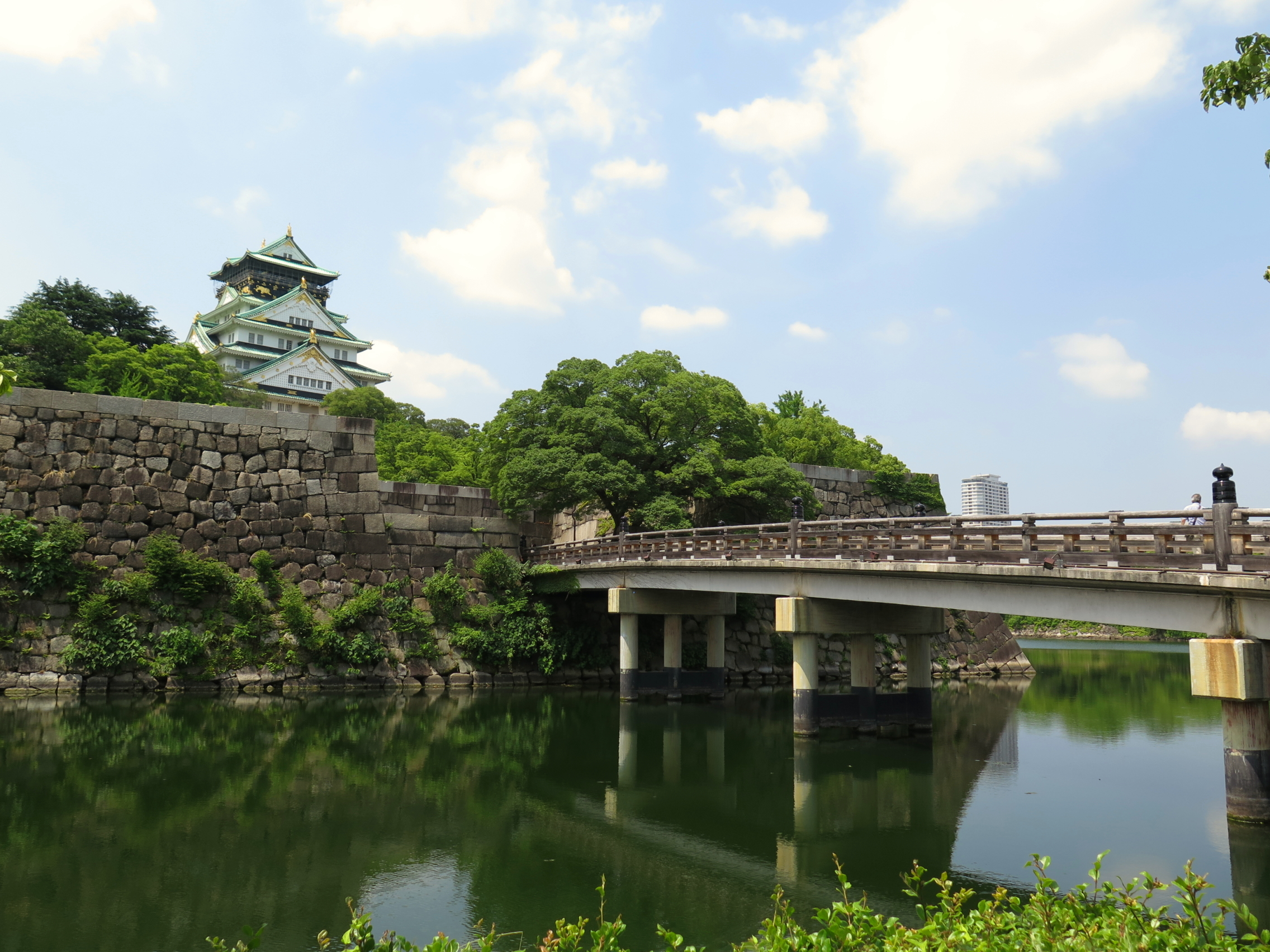
Osaka Castle

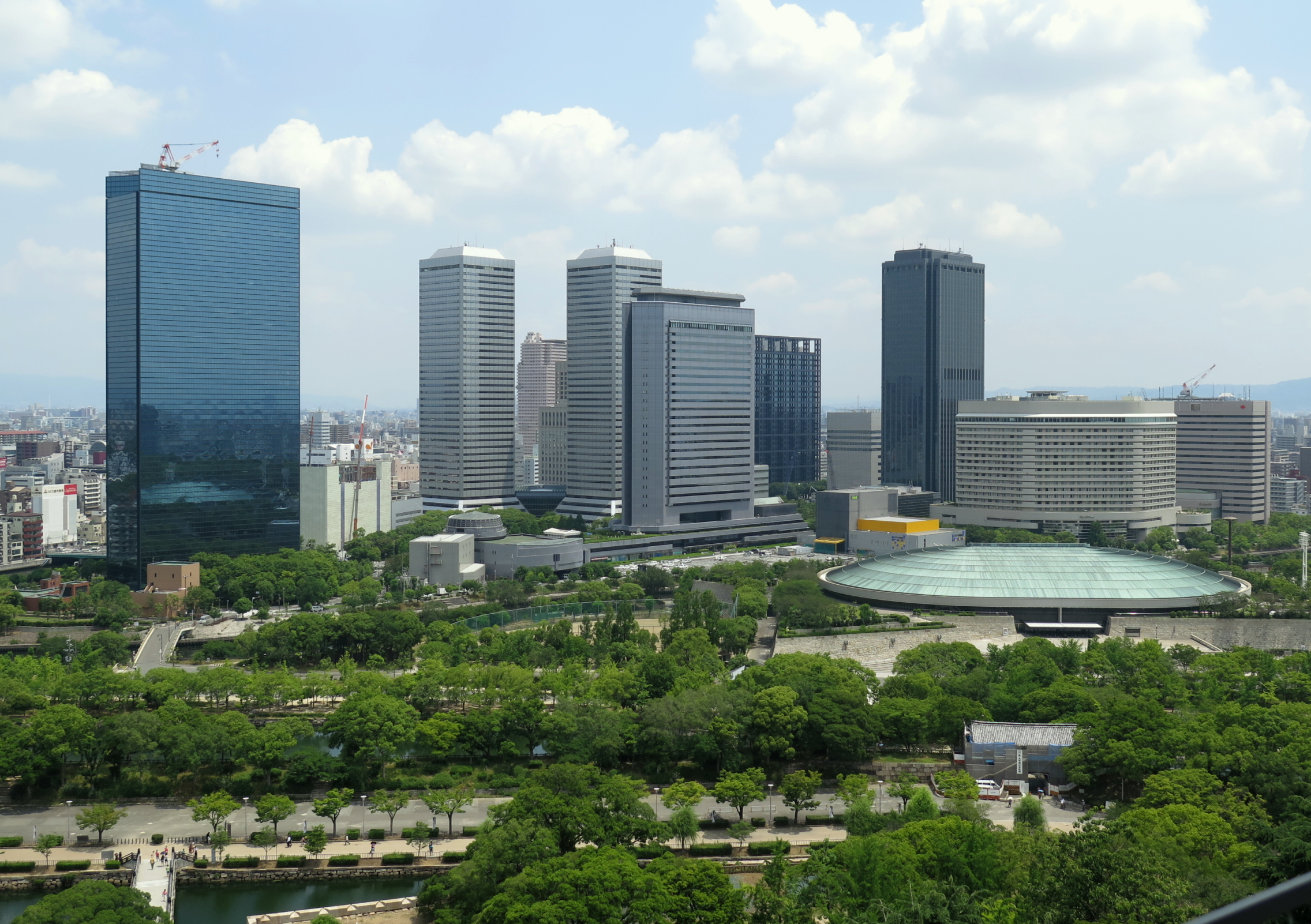
Osaka Business Park (OBP)

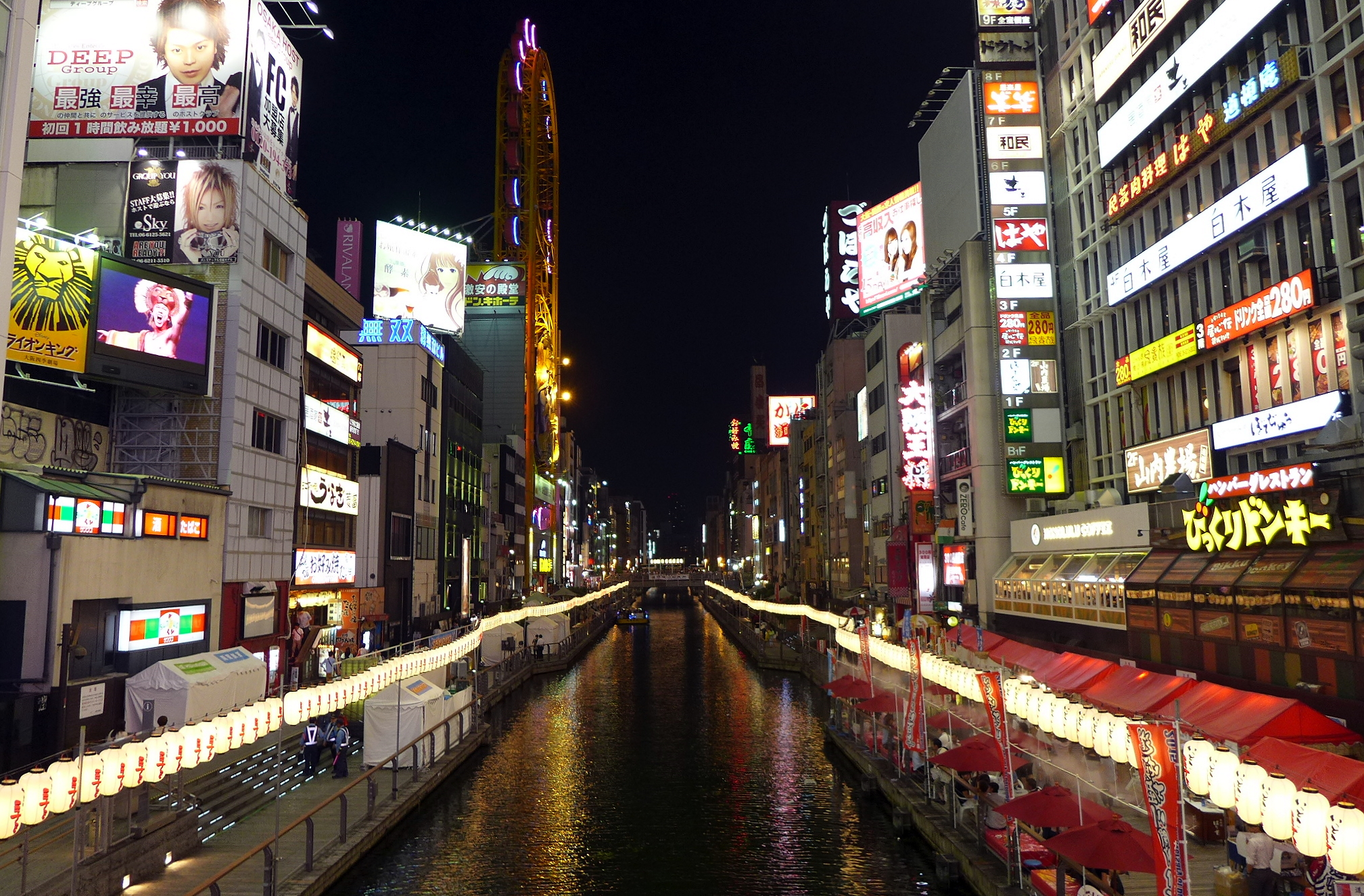
Dōtonbori River at night

Chūō-ku (中央区; 'Central Ward') is one of 24 wards of Osaka, Japan. It has an area of 8.88 km^{2}, and a population of 60,085. It houses Osaka's financial district, as well as the Osaka Prefecture offices and principal shopping and tourist areas.

== Consulates ==
Various consulates are found in Chūō-ku. The Consulate-General of South Korea has its own building. Three consulates, Consulate-General of Australia, the Consulate-General of the Netherlands, and the Consulate-General of the Philippines, occupy the twenty-ninth, thirty-third, and twenty-fourth floors, respectively, of the Twin21 MID Tower. The Consulate-General of Canada is on the twelfth floor of the Daisan Shoho Building in Chūō-ku. The Consulate-General of France is on the tenth floor of the Crystal Tower. The Consulate-General of India is on the tenth floor of the Semba I.S. Building. The Consulate-General of Indonesia is on the first floor of the Koike Bldg. The Consulate-General of Singapore is on the fourteenth floor of the Osaka Kokusai Building. The Consulate-General of Thailand is in the first, fourth, and fifth floors of the Bangkok Bank Building. The Consulate-General of the United Kingdom is on the nineteenth floor of the Seiko Osaka Building. The Consulate-General of Vietnam is on the tenth floor of the Estate Bakuro-machi Building.

== Facilities ==
=== Osaka Prefecture ===
- Osaka Prefectural Government
- Osaka Prefectural Police Head Station
  - Minami Police Station
  - Higashi Police Station
- Osaka Contemporary Art Center

==== Mass media ====
Broadcasting stations

- NHK Osaka Broadcasting Station - Otemae
- Yomiuri Telecasting Corporation - Shiromi Nichome (Osaka Business Park)
- TV Osaka - Otemae

Newspapers

- Nihon Keizai Shimbun - Otemae

== Economy ==
=== Company headquarters ===
- Capcom - Uchihiranomachi
- Daimaru
- Dainippon Sumitomo Pharma - Dojomachi
- Iwatani Corporation - Hommachi
- JEX Co., Ltd. - Jekusu Kabushiki-gaisha
- Kansai Paint - Imabashi
- Kansai Urban Banking Corporation
- Keihan Electric Railway Co., Ltd. - Otemae
- Kobayashi Pharmaceutical Co., Ltd. - Dojomachi
- Mandom Corporation - Junikencho
- Mitsubishi Tanabe Pharma Corporation - Kitahama
- Morishita Jintan Co., Ltd. - Morinomiya
- Nankai Electric Railway Co., Ltd.
- Nippon Life Insurance Company - Imabashi
- Nippon Telegraph and Telephone West Corporation (NTT West) - Bamba
- Ono Pharmaceutical - Kyutaro-machi
- Osaka Gas Co., Ltd. - Hiranomachi
- Osaka Exchange Inc. - Kitahama
- Resona Bank - Bingomachi
- Sakura Color Products Corporation - Morinomiya
- Shionogi - Dojomachi
- Sumitomo Chemical - Kitahama
- Sumitomo Life Insurance Company - Shiromi (Osaka Business Park)
- Takeda Pharmaceutical Company - Dojomachi
- Takenaka Corporation - Hommachi
- Teijin - Hommachi
- Unitika - Kyutaro-machi

Sumitomo Trust and Banking was headquartered in Kitahama prior to its merger to form Sumitomo Mitsui Trust Bank (now headquartered in Tokyo). Daiwa Bank and Kinki Osaka Bank were headquartered in Chuo-ku prior to their merger to form Resona Bank.

=== Branch offices ===
Fuji Fire and Marine Insurance has its Osaka offices in the ward.

=== Offices of foreign companies ===
Air China has an office on the 1st floor of the Uchihonmachi Green Building in Chūō-ku. Asiana Airlines operates a sales office on the 18th Floor of the Epson Osaka Building in Chūō-ku.

=== Landmarks ===
- Amerikamura
- Dōtonbori
- National Bunraku Theater
- Osaka Business Park
- Osaka Castle
- Shinsaibashi

== Railway stations ==
- West Japan Railway Company (JR West)
- Osaka Loop Line: Morinomiya Station - Osakajo-koen Station
- Keihan Electric Railway
- Keihan Line: Yodoyabashi Station - Kitahama Station - Temmabashi Station
- Kintetsu Railway
- Namba Line: Osaka Namba Station - Kintetsu Nippombashi Station
- Hanshin Electric Railway
- Hanshin Namba Line: Osaka Namba Station
- Nankai Electric Railway
- Nankai Main Line: Namba Station
- Osaka Metro
- Midosuji Line: Yodoyabashi Station - Hommachi Station - Shinsaibashi Station - Namba Station
- Tanimachi Line: Temmabashi Station - Tanimachi Yonchome Station - Tanimachi Rokuchome Station
- Chūō Line: Hommachi Station - Sakaisuji-Hommachi Station - Tanimachi Yonchome Station - Morinomiya Station
- Sennichimae Line: Namba Station - Nippombashi Station
- Sakaisuji Line: Kitahama Station - Nagahoribashi Station
- Nagahori Tsurumi-ryokuchi Line: Shinsaibashi Station - Matsuyamachi Station - Nagahoribashi Station - Tanimachi Rokuchome Station - (Tamatsukuri Station, Tennoji-ku) - Morinomiya Station - Osaka Business Park Station

== Education ==
=== University and Colleges ===
- Osaka Dental University Temmabashi Campus
- Osaka University of Economics Kitahama Campus
- Osaka Jogakuin Junior College
- Osaka Jogakuin University
- Hannan University Yodoyabashi Satellite Campus

=== Secondary Education ===
Private schools

- Osaka Jogakuin Junior and Senior High School in Tamatsukuri

== Notable people from Chūō-ku, Osaka ==
- Akinobu Okada, Japanese professional baseball player and manager
- Isuzu Yamada, Japanese stage and screen actress
- Koji Imada, Japanese musician, comedian and TV presenter
- Kosuke Gomi, Japanese novelist
- Kyū Sazanka, Japanese actor
- Naomi Osaka, Japanese tennis player
- Nakamura Ganjirō II, Japanese kabuki and film actor
- Ōnishiki Uichirō, Japanese professional sumo wrestler
- Sanjugo Naoki, Japanese novelist
- Tokuzō Tanaka, Japanese film director
- Toyoko Yamasaki, Japanese novelist
- Yoko Akino, Japanese actress
- Yusuke Hagihara, Japanese astronomer
