= Sakaisuji Line =

Metro line in Osaka prefecture, Japan

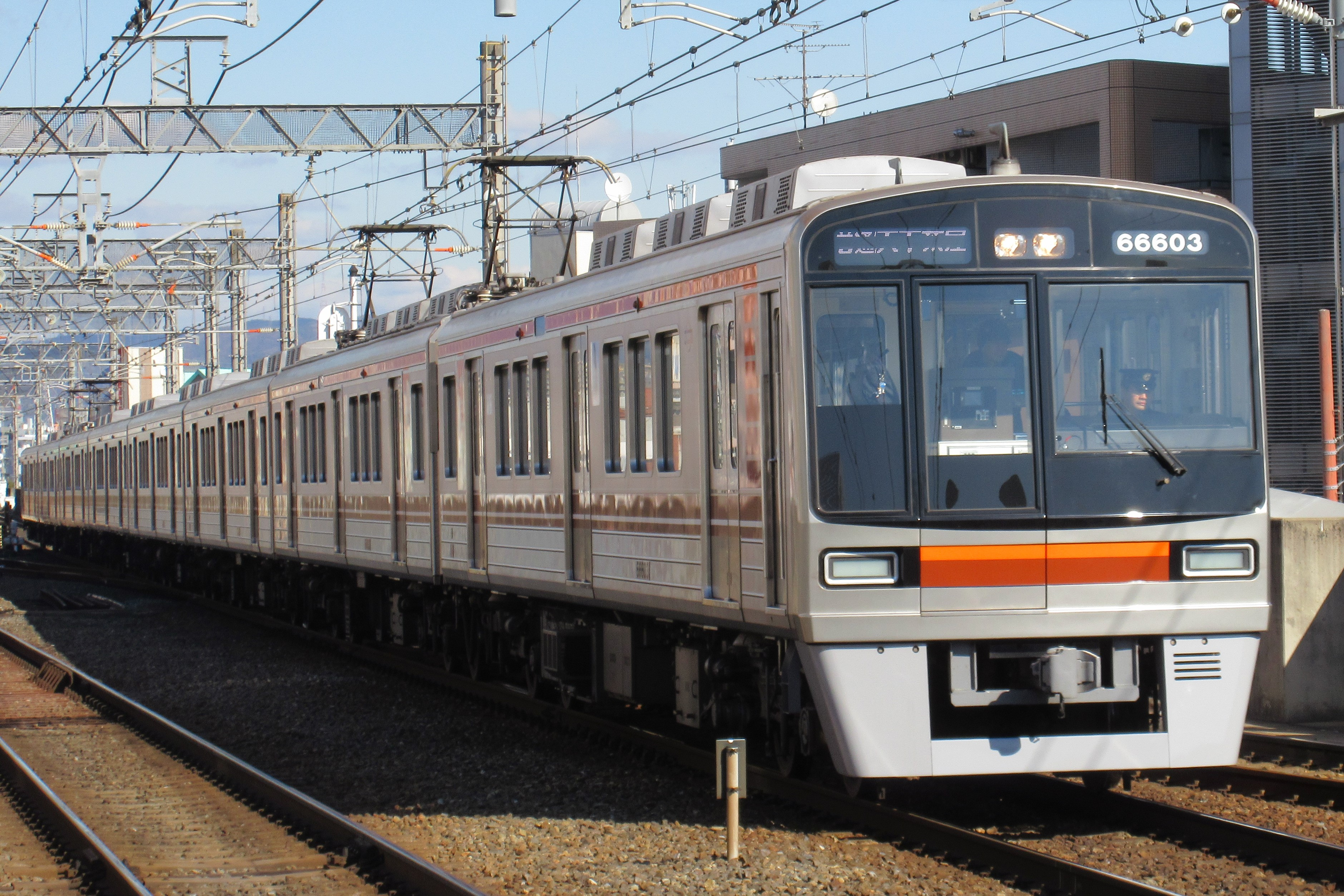
- A refurbished Sakaisuji Line 66 series EMU in January 2016

Overview
- Native name: 堺筋線
- Owner: Osaka Metro Co., Ltd. (2018–present); Osaka Municipal Transportation Bureau (1969–2018)
- Line number: 6
- Locale: Osaka
- Termini: Tenjimbashisuji Rokuchōme; Tengachaya
- Stations: 10
- Color on map: Vivid Brown (#814721)

Service
- Type: Rapid transit
- System: Osaka Metro
- Depot(s): Higashi-Suita (located on Hankyu Senri Line)
- Rolling stock: Osaka Municipal Subway 66 series; Hankyu 1300 series; Hankyu 3300 series; Hankyu 5300 series; Hankyu 7300 series; Hankyu 8300 series

History
- Opened: 6 December 1969; 56 years ago
- Last extension: 1993

Technical
- Line length: 8.1 km (5.0 mi)
- Track length: 8.5 km (5.3 mi)
- Number of tracks: Double-track
- Track gauge: 1,435 mm (4 ft 8 1/2 in) standard gauge
- Electrification: 1,500 V DC (overhead line)
- Operating speed: 70 km/h (45 mph)
- Signalling: Automatic closing block
- Train protection system: WS-ATC
Route map

The Sakaisuji Line (堺筋線, Sakaisuji-sen) is an underground rapid transit line in Osaka, Japan, operated by Osaka Metro. Its official name is Rapid Electric Tramway Line No. 6 (高速電気軌道第6号線), and in MLIT publications, it is written as Line No. 6 (Sakaisuji Line) (6号線（堺筋線）).

The Sakaisuji Line is unique in the Osaka Metro system in that despite being regulated as a tramway under the Railway Business Act like the other lines, the line was constructed as an extension of a line governed as a railway, specifically the Hankyu Senri Line, to which the Sakaisuji Line connects to at its northern end at Tenjimbashisuji Rokuchōme Station. Through services using both Osaka Municipal Subway and Hankyu rolling stock operates to and from the Senri Line and Arashiyama Line via the Kyoto Main Line.

== History ==
The Sakaisuji Line was first envisioned in the Urban Transportation Council Report No. 3 (1958) as an underground line running from Tenjimbashisuji Rokuchōme to Tenma via Sakaisuji and Dobutsuen-mae, and it was to be operated by Hankyu Railway instead of the Osaka prefectural government. In 1963, the Urban Transportation Council Report No. 7 (1963) recommended that the southern terminus of the Sakaisuji Line be at Tengachaya instead of Tenma.

Later unrealised plans for the Sakaisuji Line included two separate extensions to Nakamozu and Sugimotochō, and at one point it was envisioned that through-services between the standard-gauge Hankyu Railway and the narrow-gauge Nankai Railway would be realised by connecting them together with the Sakaisuji Line through the use of dual gauge tracks, however that plan was abandoned due to the different electrification systems used by Hankyu and Nankai.

The Sakaisuji Line opened on December 6, 1969 between Tenjimbashisuji Rokuchōme and Dōbutsuen-mae, at which point the previous ground-level southern terminal of the Hankyu Senri Line at Tenjinbashi was closed. The line was extended from Dōbutsuen-mae to Tengachaya on 4 March 1993, as a metro-based replacement of the former Nankai Tennoji Branch Line which closed at the same time.

== Stations ==
Station numbers on the Sakaisuji Line (excluding Hankyu-operated stations) are indicated by the letter "K".

The seasonal Limited Express service known as "Hozu" (operated by Hankyu between Tengachaya and Arashiyama) stops at the stations with a "●", while other trains (local trains, Sakaisuji Semi-Express trains, and trains to Kawaramachi) stop at every station.

All stations are in Osaka.

| No. | Station name | Japanese | Distance (km) | Seasonal Limited Express Hozu | Transfers | Location |
|---|---|---|---|---|---|---|
| Hankyu through services: | | | From Tenjimbashisuji Rokuchōme: to Kita-Senri on the Senri Line to Kawaramachi on the Hankyu Kyoto Main Line via Awaji to Arashiyama on the Arashiyama Line via Awaji and Katsura (seasonal; Hozu services only) | | | |
| K 11 | Tenjimbashisuji Rokuchōme | 天神橋筋六丁目 | 0.0 | ● | Tanimachi Line (T18) Hankyu Senri Line (Through service) | Kita-ku |
| K 12 | Ōgimachi | 扇町 | 0.7 | | | O Osaka Loop Line (Temma, JR-O10) | Kita-ku |
| K 13 | Minami-morimachi | 南森町 | 1.3 | | | Tanimachi Line (T21); H JR Tōzai Line (Osakatemmangu, JR-H43) | Kita-ku |
| K 14 | Kitahama | 北浜 | 2.1 | | | Keihan Main Line (KH02) Keihan Nakanoshima Line (Naniwabashi, KH51) | Chūō-ku |
| K 15 | Sakaisuji-Hommachi (Semba-higashi) | 堺筋本町 （船場東） | 3.0 | | | Chūō Line (C17) | Chūō-ku |
| K 16 | Nagahoribashi | 長堀橋 | 4.0 | | | Nagahori Tsurumi-ryokuchi Line (N16) | Chūō-ku |
| K 17 | Nippombashi | 日本橋 | 4.9 | ● | Sennichimae Line (S17); A Kintetsu Namba Line (A02) | Chūō-ku |
| K 18 | Ebisuchō (Nippombashi-suji) | 恵美須町 （日本橋筋） | 5.9 | | | Hankai Line (HN51) | Naniwa-ku |
| K 19 | Dobutsuen-mae (Shinsekai) | 動物園前 （新世界） | 6.6 | | | Midōsuji Line (M22); O Osaka Loop Line (Shin-Imamiya) (JR-O19); Q Yamatoji Line (Kansai Line) (Shin-Imamiya) (JR-Q19); Hankai Line (Shin-Imamiya-eki-mae, HN52) | Nishinari-ku |
| K 20 | Tengachaya | 天下茶屋 | 8.1 | ● | Nankai Main Line (NK05); Nankai Koya Line (NK05) | Nishinari-ku |

== Rolling stock ==
The Sakaisuji Line is the first Osaka subway line to use overhead lines instead of third rail for power collection. All trains are based at Higashi-Suita Depot located on the Hankyu Senri Line.

=== Current ===
- Osaka Municipal Subway 66 series (since 1993)
- Hankyu 1300 series (since 2014)
- Hankyu 3300 series (since 1969)
- Hankyu 5300 series (since 1979)
- Hankyu 7300 series (since 1989)
- Hankyu 8300 series (since 1989)

=== Former ===
- Osaka Municipal Subway 60 series (1969–2003)

== See also ==
- List of railway lines in Japan
