= Osaka Jogakuin University =

- 大阪女学院大学
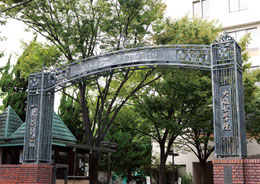
- Southern gate of the college
- Former names: Wilmina Girls' School; Osaka Jogakuin Girls School
- Type: Private, women's
- Established: 1884 - Wilmina Girls' School; 1968 - Osaka Jogakuin College; 2004 - Osaka Jogakuin University
- Founders: Alexander D. Hail; J.B. Hail
- Affiliations: ACUCA
- Endowment: ¥18.85 million (2020)
- Chairperson: Ichiro Nishikori
- President: Eiko Kato
- Academic staff: 101 (2021)
- Students: 776 (2021)
- Location: 2-26-54, Tamatsukuri, Chūō, Osaka, Osaka, 540-0004, Japan; 34°40′33″N 135°31′40.4″E
- Website: www.wilmina.ac.jp/oj/

Osaka Jogakuin University (大阪女学院大学, Ōsaka Jogakuin Daigaku) is a private women's university in Osaka, Osaka Prefecture, Japan.

== Department ==
- Department of International & English Interdisciplinary Studies

== Graduate school ==
- Graduate School of International Collaboration in the 21st Century
  - Master's and Doctoral Courses of Peace Studies and Human Rights Studies
