= Hankyu 5300 series =

Japanese train type

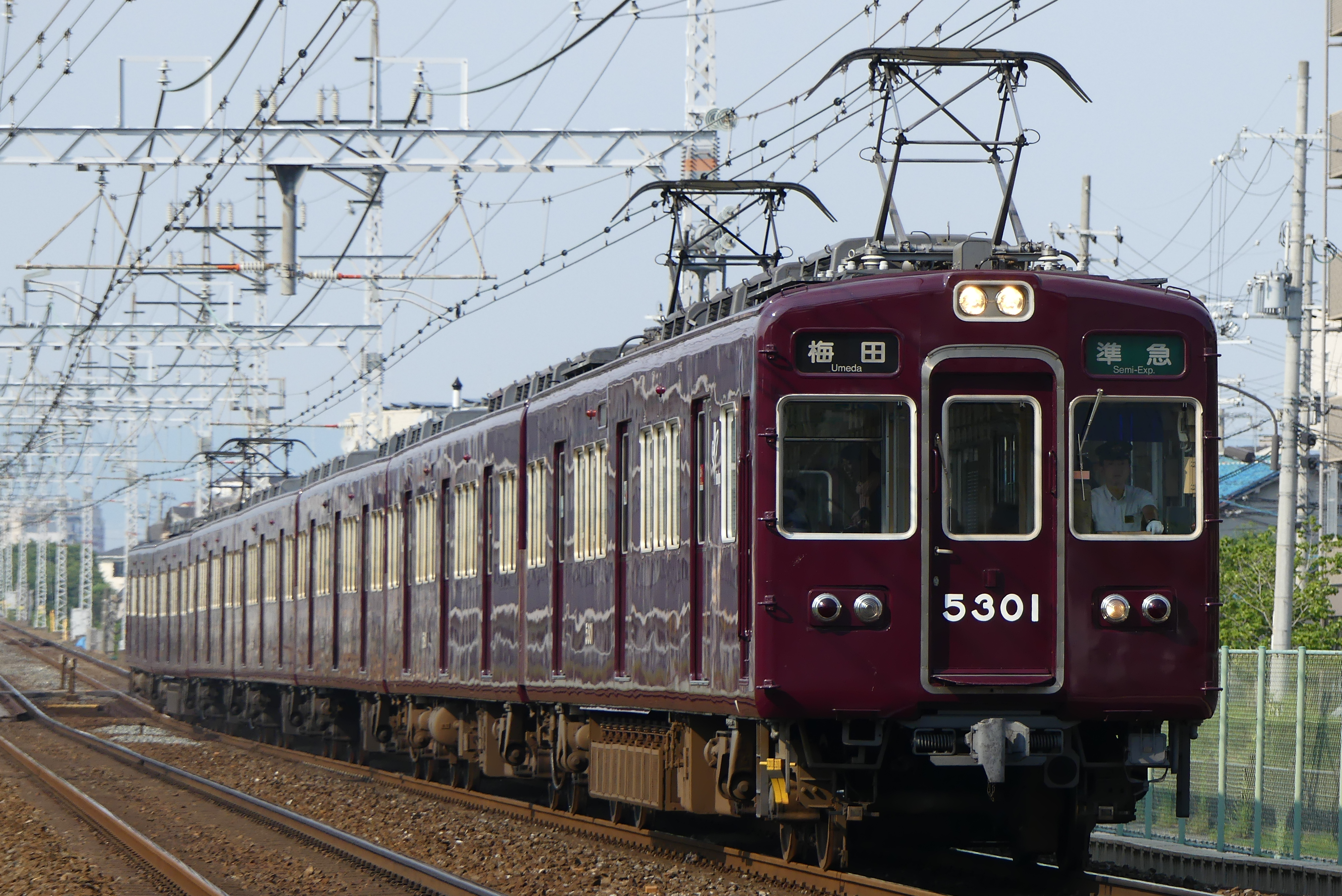
- A 5300 series set in 2018
- In service: 1972–
- Manufacturer: Alna Kōki
- Constructed: 1972–1984
- Entered service: 1972
- Refurbished: 1989, 2002–2003
- Number built: 105 vehicles (19 sets)
- Number in service: 96 vehicles (13 sets)
- Number scrapped: 9 vehicles
- Formation: 7/8 cars per trainset
- Fleet numbers: 5300–5324
- Capacity: 48/92 (primary car); 52/98 (secondary car)
- Operators: Hankyu Railway
- Lines served: Hankyu Kyoto Line; Hankyu Senri Line; Hankyu Arashiyama Line; Osaka Metro Sakaisuji Line

Specifications
- Car body construction: Steel
- Car length: 18,900 mm (62 ft 0 in)
- Width: 2,809 mm (9 ft 2.6 in)
- Height: 4,095 mm (13 ft 5.2 in)
- Doors: 3 pairs per side
- Maximum speed: 115 km/h (71 mph)
- Traction system: Resistor control TDK8550-A
- Power output: 140 kW (188 hp)
- Acceleration: 2.6 km/(h⋅s) (1.6 mph/s); 2.8 km/(h⋅s) (1.7 mph/s) (Sakaisuji line)
- Deceleration: 3.7 km/(h⋅s) (2.3 mph/s); 4.2 km/(h⋅s) (2.6 mph/s) (emergency)
- Electric system(s): 1,500 V DC overhead catenary
- Current collector(s): Pantograph
- Braking system(s): Electronically controlled pneumatic brakes with dynamic braking
- Safety system(s): ATS, ATC, Deadman's switch
- Coupling system: Shibata-type
- Track gauge: 1,435 mm (4 ft 8 1/2 in)

The Hankyu 5300 series (阪急電鉄5300系) is an electric multiple unit (EMU) train type operated in Japan by the private railway operator Hankyu Railway since 1972.

== Operation ==
The 5300 series consists of eight-car and seven-car sets.

Seven car sets are not allowed on the Sakaisuji Line.

== Formations ==
As of December 2020, the fleet consists of 96 cars formed as eight-car and seven-car sets as follows, with two car spares. All "Mc" 5300 cars are at the Umeda end while all lead car "M'c" 5400 cars are at the Kyoto-Kawaramachi and Kita-Senri end.

=== 8-car sets ===
Car No.	1	2	3	4	5	6	7	8
Designation	Mc	M'c	Mc	M'	T	T	M	M'c
Numbering	Mc 5300	Mc 5400	Mc 5300	Mc 5400	T 5850	T 5850	M 5900	Mc 5400

- The "Mc" and "M" cars are each fitted with two scissors-type pantographs.

=== 7-car sets ===
Car No.	1	2	3	4	5	6	7
Designation	Mc	T	M'c	Mc	T	T	M'c
Numbering	Mc 5300	T 5850	Mc 5400	Mc 5300	T 5850	T 5850	Mc 5400
Designation	Mc	M'	T	T	T	M	M'c
Numbering	Mc 5300	M 5800	T 5850	T 5850	T 5850	M 5900	Mc 5400
Designation	Mc	T	T	M'c	Mc	T	M'c
Numbering	Mc 5300	T 5850	T 5850	Mc 5400	Mc 5300	T 5850	Mc 5400

- The "Mc" and the "M" cars are each fitted with two scissors-type pantographs.

=== 2-car spare set ===
Car No.	1	2
Designation	M'	M'
Numbering	M 5800	M 5800

== Interior ==
Passenger accommodation consists of longitudinal bench seating throughout. Paneling is made of faux wood.

== Gallery ==
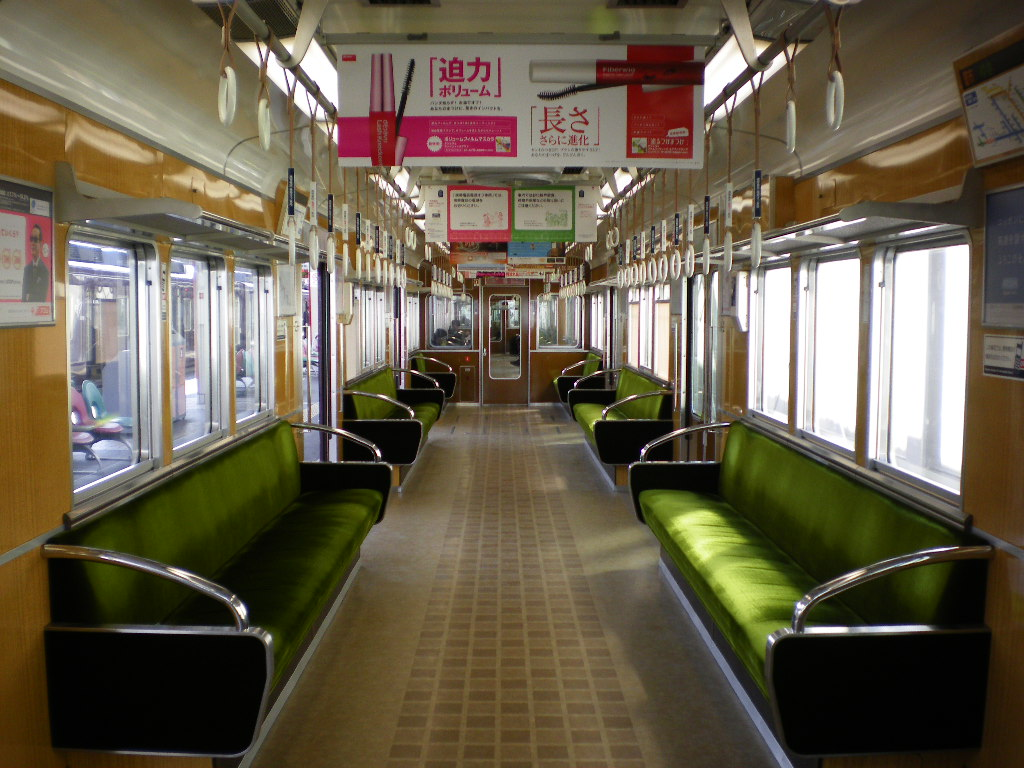
Inside a 5300 series car

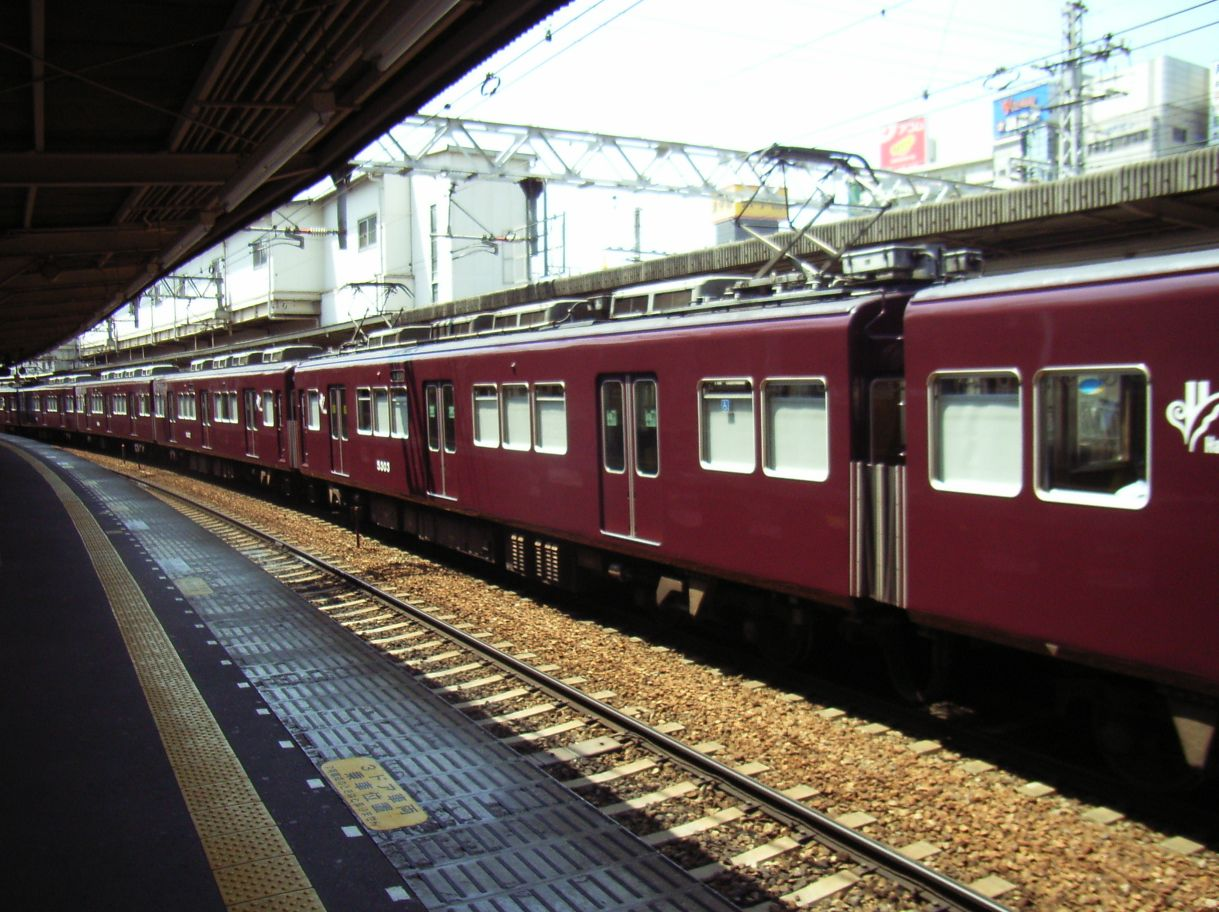
A 5300 series set after renewal work. Note the drivers cabs sandwiched in the middle of the trainset
