= Tengachaya Station =

Railway and metro station in Osaka, Japan

Tengachaya Station 天下茶屋駅
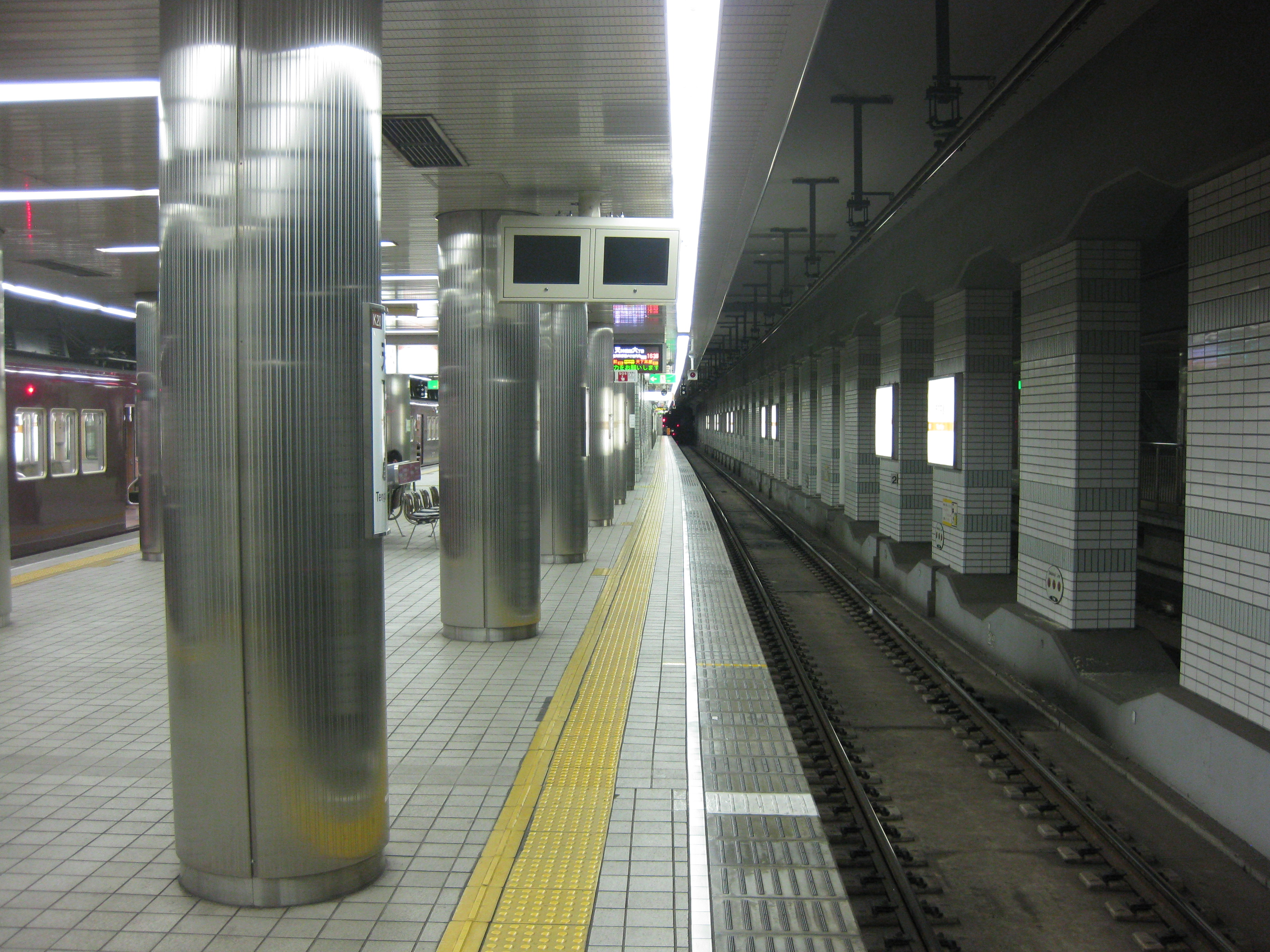
- Tengachaya Station subway island platform. A train can be seen on the far left, where the side platform is.

General information
- Location: 1, Kishinosato Itchōme, Nishinari, Osaka, Osaka （大阪市西成区岸里一丁目1番） Japan
- Coordinates: 34°38′13.9″N 135°29′48.28″E
- Operator: Nankai Railway; Osaka Metro
Location
- Location within Osaka Prefecture Location within Japan

Tengachaya Station (天下茶屋駅, Tengachaya-eki) is a Nankai Electric Railway and Osaka Metro Sakaisuji Line railway station and metro station in Nishinari-ku, Osaka. It is the terminal station of the southern end of the Sakaisuji Line. All trains of the Nankai Main Line and the Kōya Line of Nankai Electric Railway stop at Tengachaya.

This station is situated relatively close to Kishinosato on the Yotsubashi Line, but there are no transfer passageways between the two stations.

== History ==
Tengachaya Station opened on December 29, 1885, as one of the original stations on the Hankai Railway (the predecessor of Nankai Electric Railway). On October 26, 1900, the Nankai Tennoji Branch Line was opened connecting Tengachaya to Tennōji Station.

On March 4, 1993, the Osaka Municipal Subway Sakaisuji Line was extended from Dōbutsuen-mae Station to Tengachaya, making Tengachaya the southern terminus of the Sakaisuji Line and establishing a major transfer hub between the subway system and Nankai lines. To accommodate the subway extension and eliminate ground-level railway crossings, Nankai tracks were elevated in phases between April 1993 and November 1996.

Following track elevation, all express and limited express trains on the Nankai Main Line and Kōya Line—including the Rapi:t airport express—were made to stop at Tengachaya, transforming it into a major regional transfer station.

== Lines ==
- Nankai Electric Railway (NK05)
  - Nankai Main Line
  - Kōya Line
- Osaka Metro Sakaisuji Line (K20)

== Layout ==
=== Nankai Railway ===
Tengachaya Station 天下茶屋駅

General information
- Location: 1-9, Kishinosato Itchōme, Nishinari, Osaka, Osaka （大阪市西成区岸里一丁目1-9） Japan
- System: Nankai Railway station
- Operator: Nankai Railway
- Lines: Nankai Main Line; Kōya Line
- Platforms: 4 (1 island platform, 2 side platforms)

Construction
- Structure type: Elevated

Other information
- Station code: NK05

History
- Opened: 1885; 141 years ago
Track layout
Location

- The station is elevated and has been the interchange station between the Nankai Line and the Koya Line since March 24, 2001. It has an island platform serving 2 tracks and is between two side platforms serving a track each. The island platform allows for cross-platform interchange from the Koya Line Namba-bound trains to the Nankai Line Wakayamashi-bound and Kansai Airport-bound trains (and vice versa).

1	■ Koya Line	for Koyasan and (■Semboku Rapid Railway) Izumi-Chūō
2	■ Koya Line	for Haginochaya, Shin-Imamiya, Imamiyaebisu and Namba (Local trains (各駅停車) stop at Haginochaya and Imamiyaebisu)
3	■ Nankai Line	for Wakayamashi and (■Airport Line)Kansai Airport
4	■ Nankai Line	for Namba (passing Haginochaya and Imamiyaebisu)

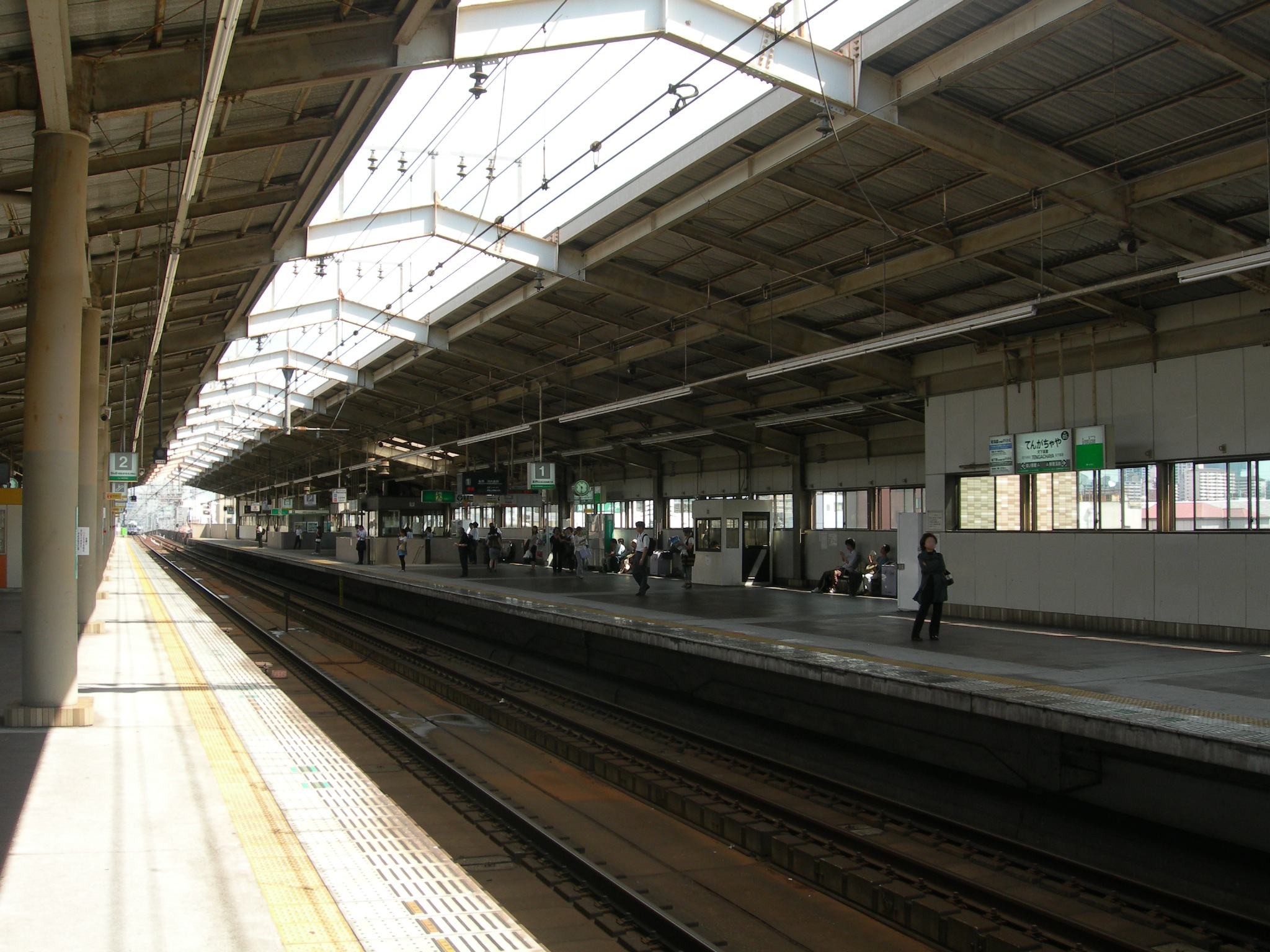
Platform 1 and 2

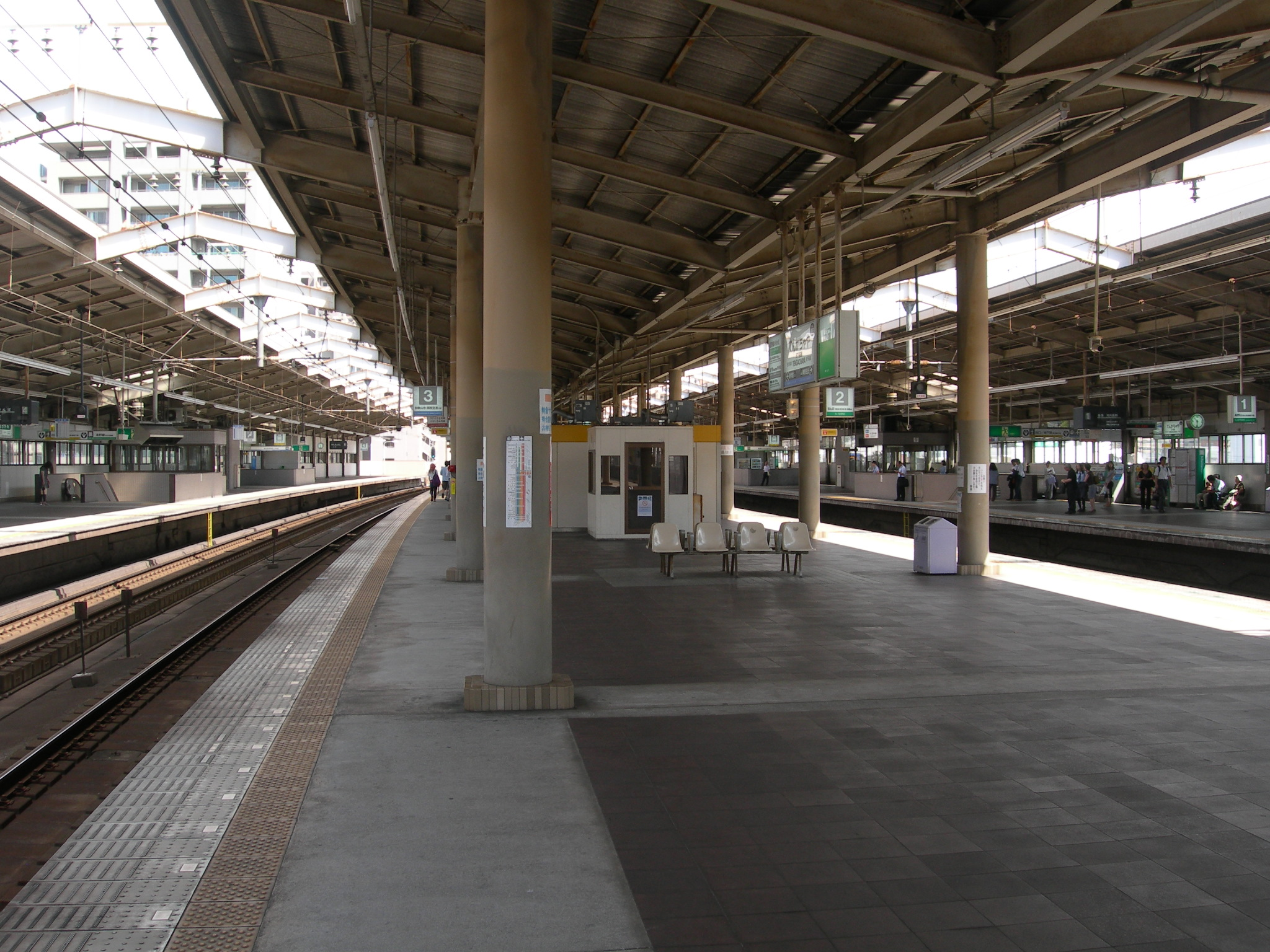
Platform 2 and 3

=== Osaka Metro Sakaisuji Line ===
Tengachaya Station 天下茶屋駅

General information
- Location: 1-10, Kishinosato Itchōme, Nishinari, Osaka, Osaka （大阪市西成区岸里一丁目1-10） Japan
- System: Osaka Metro
- Operator: Osaka Metro
- Line: Sakaisuji Line
- Platforms: 1 island platform, 1 side platform
- Tracks: 3

Construction
- Structure type: Underground

Other information
- Station code: K 20

History
- Opened: 4 March 1993; 33 years ago

Services
Preceding station	Osaka Metro	Following station
Dobutsuen-mae K 19 towards Tenjimbashisuji Rokuchōme	Sakaisuji Line	Terminus
Track layout
Location

- The station on the Sakaisuji Line is located under the station on Nankai Railway, and was constructed together with the elevation of the Nankai Railway lines. An island platform serving 2 tracks and a side platform serving a track are located on the first basement. The side platform is used as the arrival platform.

1	■ Arrival platform	
2, 3	■ Sakaisuji Line	for Nippombashi, Sakaisuji-Hommachi, Tenjimbashisuji Rokuchome, Awaji, Kita-Senri, Takatsuki-shi and Kyoto (Kawaramachi)

== Adjacent stations ==
«	Service	»
Nankai Electric Railway (NK05)
Nankai Main Line (No trains stop at Imamiyaebisu and Haginochaya)
Shin-Imamiya (NK03)	Local (普通車)	Kishinosato-Tamade (NK06)
Shin-Imamiya (NK03)	Semi-Express (running only for Namba on weekdays)	Sakai (NK11)
Shin-Imamiya (NK03)	Sub. Express	Sakai (NK11)
Shin-Imamiya (NK03)	Airport Express	Sakai (NK11)
Shin-Imamiya (NK03)	Express	Sakai (NK11)
Shin-Imamiya (NK03)	Limited Express ("Rapi:t β", "Southern")	Sakai (NK11)
Shin-Imamiya (NK03)	Limited Express "Rapi:t α"	Kansai Airport (NK32)
Koya Line
Haginochaya (NK04)	Local (各駅停車)	Kishinosato-Tamade (NK06)
Shin-Imamiya (NK03)	Semi-Express	Sakaihigashi (NK56)
Shin-Imamiya (NK03)	Sub. Express	Sakaihigashi (NK56)
Shin-Imamiya (NK03)	Express	Sakaihigashi (NK56)
Shin-Imamiya (NK03)	Rapid Express	Sakaihigashi (NK56)
Shin-Imamiya (NK03)	Limited Express ("Koya", "Rinkan")	Sakaihigashi (NK56)
Shin-Imamiya (NK03)	Limited Express ("Semboku Liner")	Izumigaoka (SB03), Semboku Rapid Railway
Osaka Metro
Sakaisuji Line (K20)
Dōbutsuen-mae (K19)	Local	Terminus
Dōbutsuen-mae (K19)	Semi-Express	Terminus
Nippombashi (K17)	Extra Limited Express "Hozu"	Terminus
