= Nippombashi Station =

Metro station in Osaka, Japan

Nippombashi Station 日本橋駅
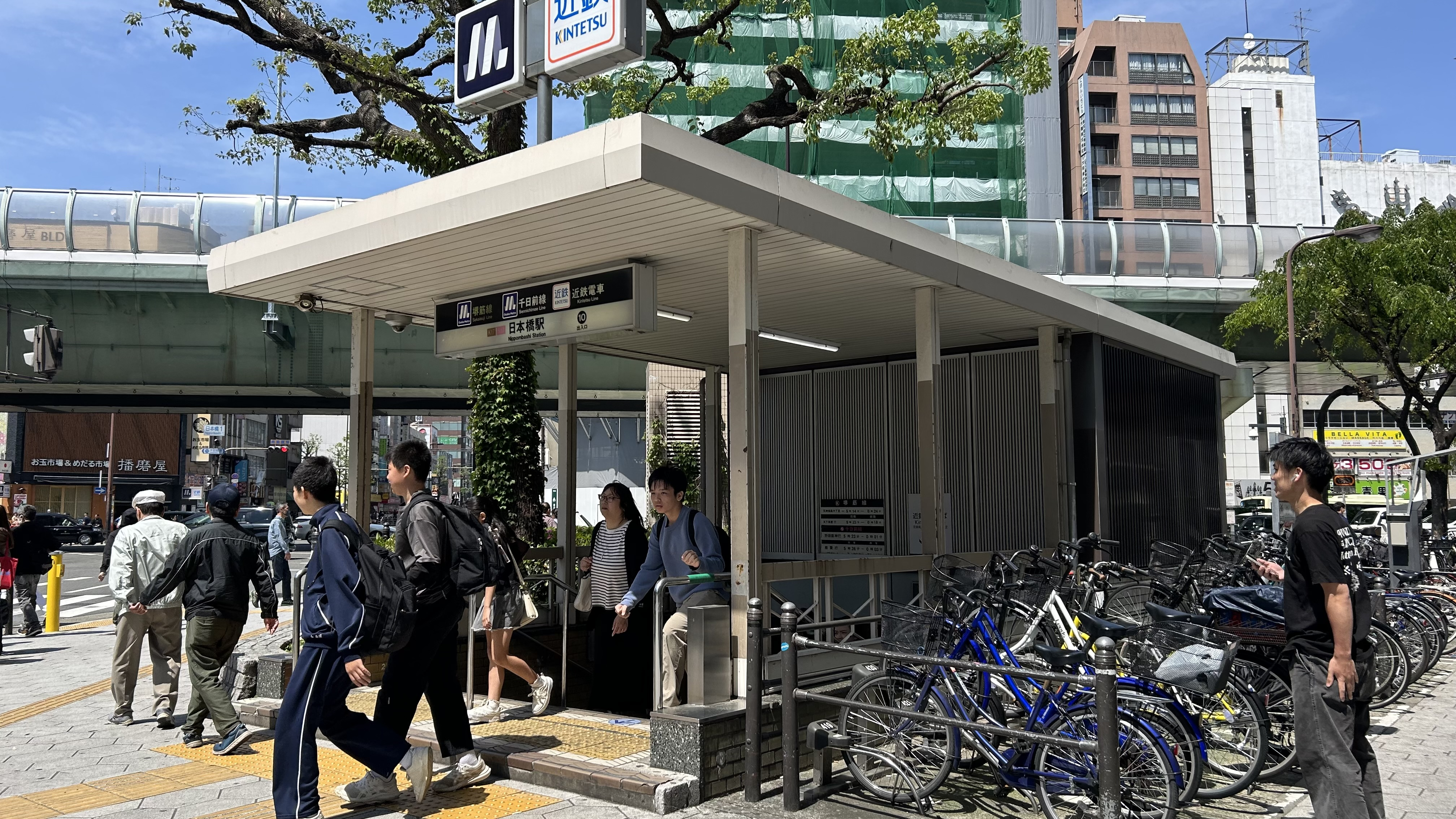
- Exit 10

General information
- Location: 5-12, Nippombashi Itchome, Chuo, Osaka, Osaka （大阪市中央区日本橋一丁目5-12） Japan
- Coordinates: 34°40′1.18″N 135°30′22.08″E
- System: Osaka Metro
- Operator: Osaka Metro
- Lines: Sakaisuji Line; Sennichimae Line
- Platforms: 1 island platform (Sennichimae Line); 2 side platforms (Sakaisuji Line)
- Tracks: 4 (2 for each line)
- Connections: Kintetsu Railway Namba Line at Kintetsu Nippombashi

Construction
- Structure type: Underground

Other information
- Station code: S 17 K 17

History
- Opened: 6 December 1969; 56 years ago

Services
Preceding station	Osaka Metro	Following station
Namba S 16 towards Nodahanshin	Sennichimae Line	Tanimachi Kyūchōme S 18 towards Minami-Tatsumi
Nagahoribashi K 16 towards Tenjimbashisuji Rokuchōme	Sakaisuji Line	Ebisuchō K 18 towards Tengachaya
Location
- Location within Osaka Prefecture Location within Japan

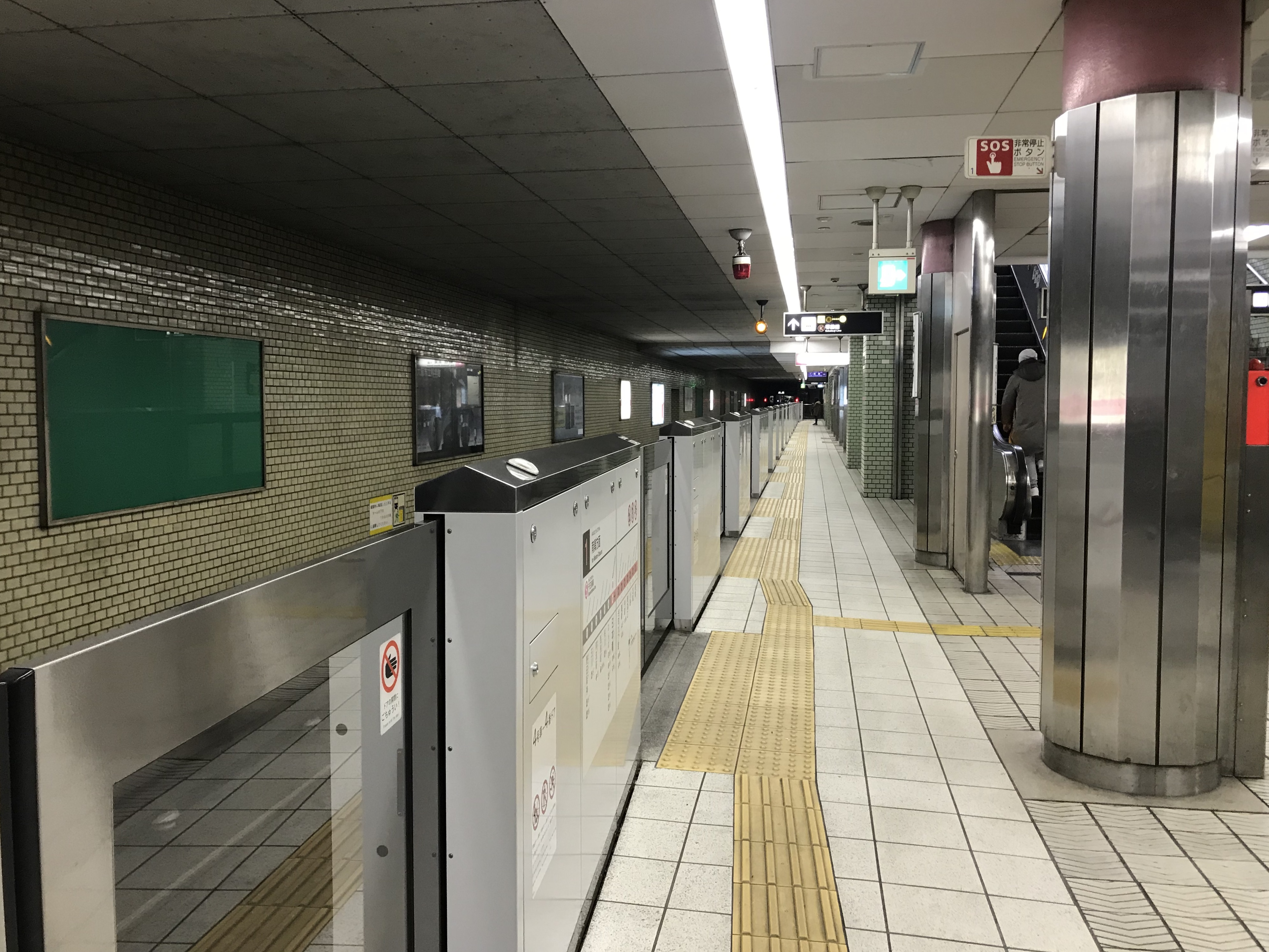
Sennichimae Line platforms

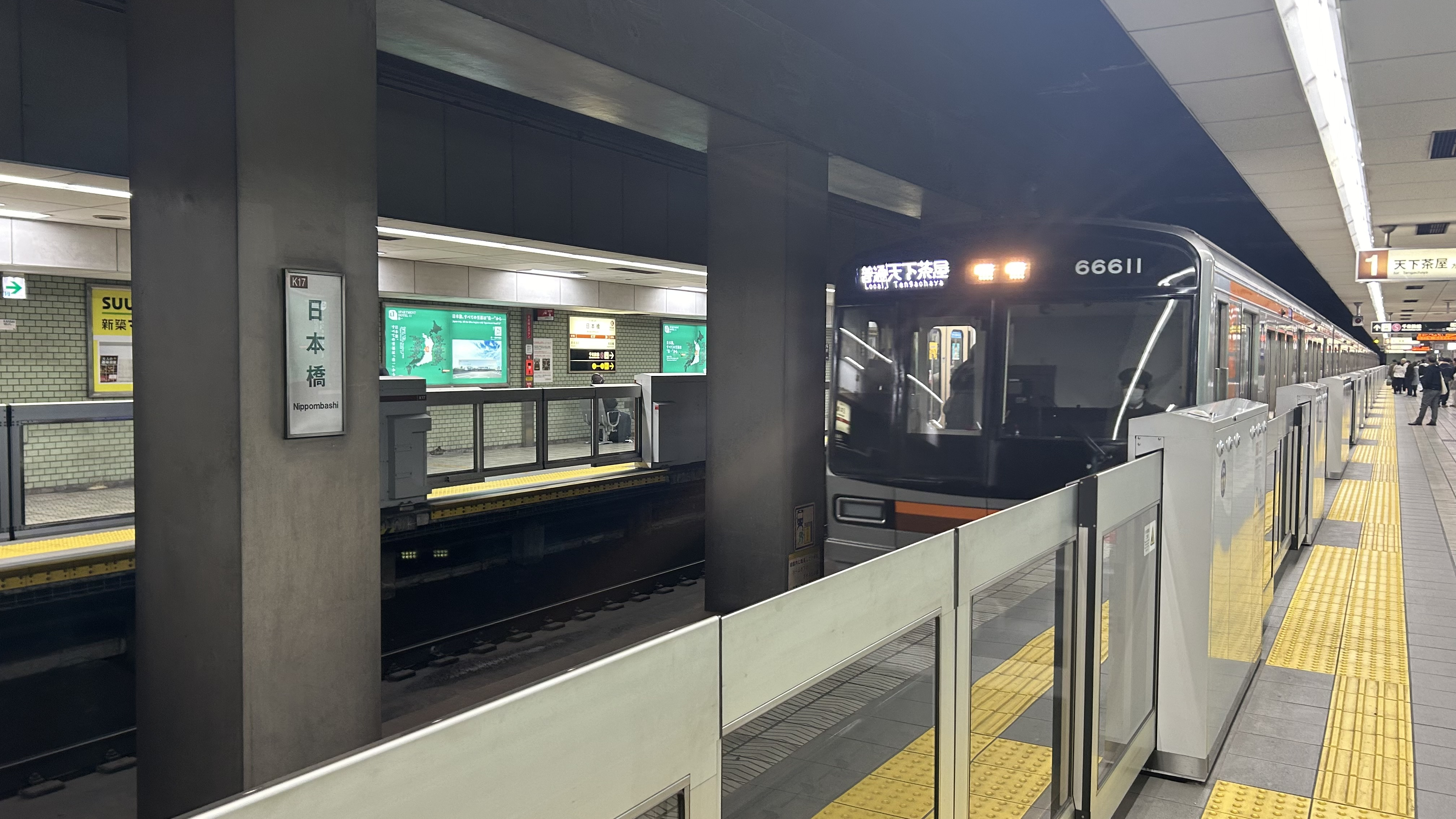
Sakaisuji Line platforms

Nippombashi Station (日本橋駅, Nipponbashi Eki) is a railway station on the two lines of the Osaka Metro in Nippombashi Itchome, Chūō-ku, Osaka, Japan.

== Lines ==
- Osaka Metro
  - Sakaisuji Line (K17)
  - Sennichimae Line (S17)
- Kintetsu Railway Namba Line (Kintetsu Nippombashi Station)

== Layout ==
- The station has side platforms serving two tracks for the Sakaisuji Line on the first basement, and an island platform serving two tracks for the Sennichimae Line on the second basement. Ticket gates are located on the first basement on the platforms for the Sakaisuji Line.

Sakaisuji Line

1	■ Sakaisuji Line	for Dobutsuen-mae and Tengachaya
2	■ Sakaisuji Line	for Tenjimbashisuji Rokuchome, Awaji, Kita-Senri and Takatsuki-shi

Sennichimae Line

1	■ Sennichimae Line	for Tsuruhashi and Minami-Tatsumi
2	■ Sennichimae Line	for Namba, Awaza, and Nodahanshin

== Surroundings ==
- Namba Walk
- Kuromon Ichiba
- Den Den Town
- National Bunraku Theatre
- Dotombori River
  - Nippombashi Bridge

=== Bus route ===
Nippombashi Itchome (Osaka City Bus)

- Route 73 for Namba / for Deto Bus Terminal via Uehommachi Rokuchome and Kumata

== Stations next to Nippombashi ==
«	Service	»
Osaka Metro
Sakaisuji Line (K17)
Nagahoribashi (K16)	Local	Ebisuchō (K18)
Nagahoribashi (K16)	Semi-Express	Ebisuchō (K18)
Tenjimbashisuji Rokuchome (K11)	Extra Limited Express "Hozu"	Tengachaya (K20)
