= Shōji Station (Osaka) =

Metro station in Osaka, Japan

Coordinates: 34.6613°N 135.5565°E

Shōji Station 小路駅
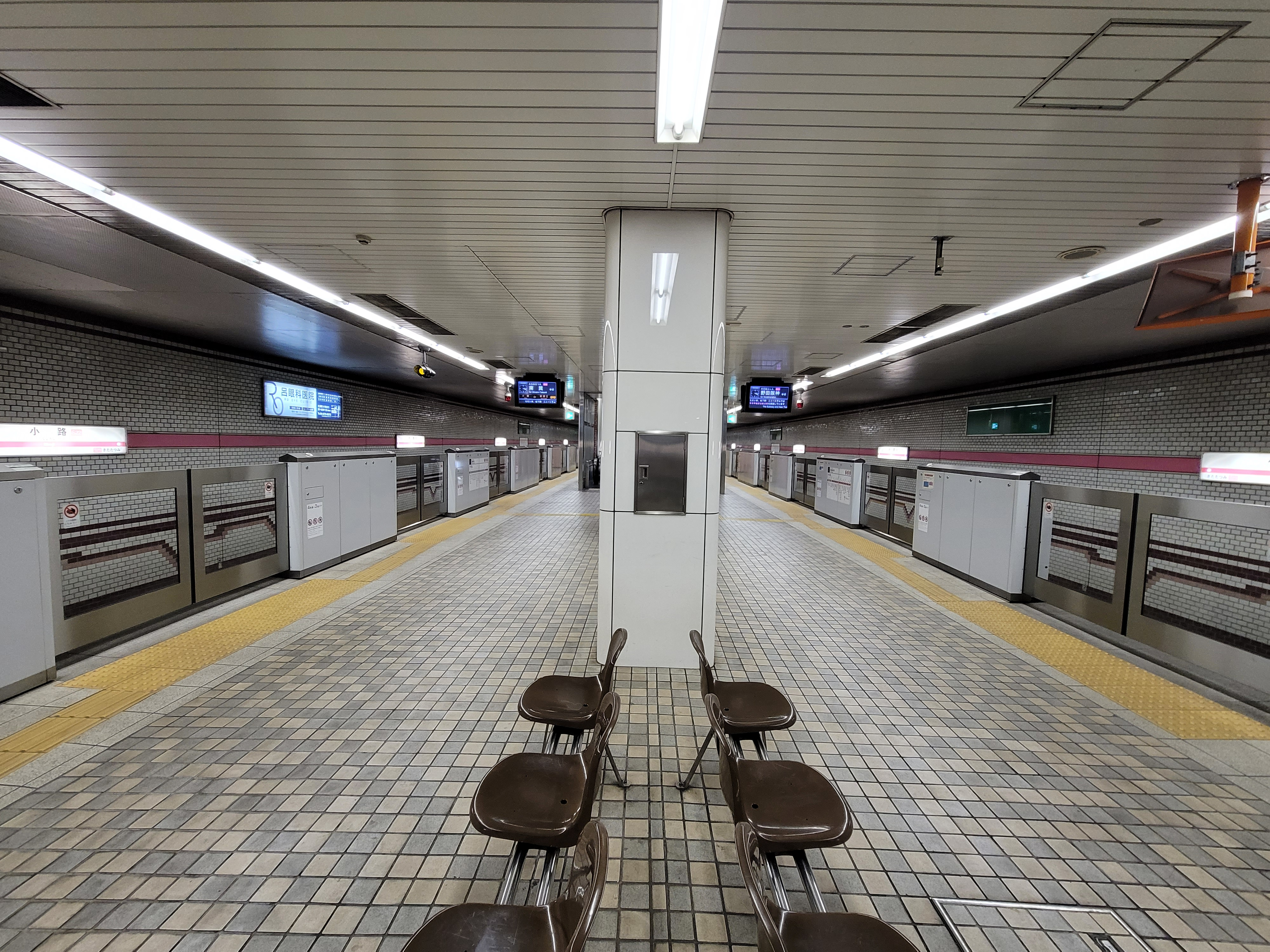

General information
- System: Osaka Metro
- Operator: Osaka Metro
- Line: Sennichimae Line
- Platforms: 1 island platform
- Tracks: 2

Construction
- Structure type: Underground

Other information
- Station code: S 22

History
- Opened: 2 December 1981; 44 years ago

Services
Preceding station	Osaka Metro	Following station
Shin-Fukae S 21 towards Nodahanshin	Sennichimae Line	Kita-Tatsumi S 23 towards Minami-Tatsumi
Location
- Location within Osaka Prefecture Location within Japan

Shoji Station (小路駅, Shōji-eki; station number: S22) is a railway station on the Osaka Metro Sennichimae Line in Ikuno-ku, Osaka, Japan.

== Layout ==
There is an island platform with two tracks on the 2nd basement.

1	■ Sennichimae Line	for Minami-Tatsumi
2	■ Sennichimae Line	for Tsuruhashi, Namba, Awaza and Nodahanshin
