= Shin-Fukae Station =

Metro station in Osaka, Japan

Coordinates: 34.6679°N 135.5541°E

Shin-Fukae Station 新深江駅
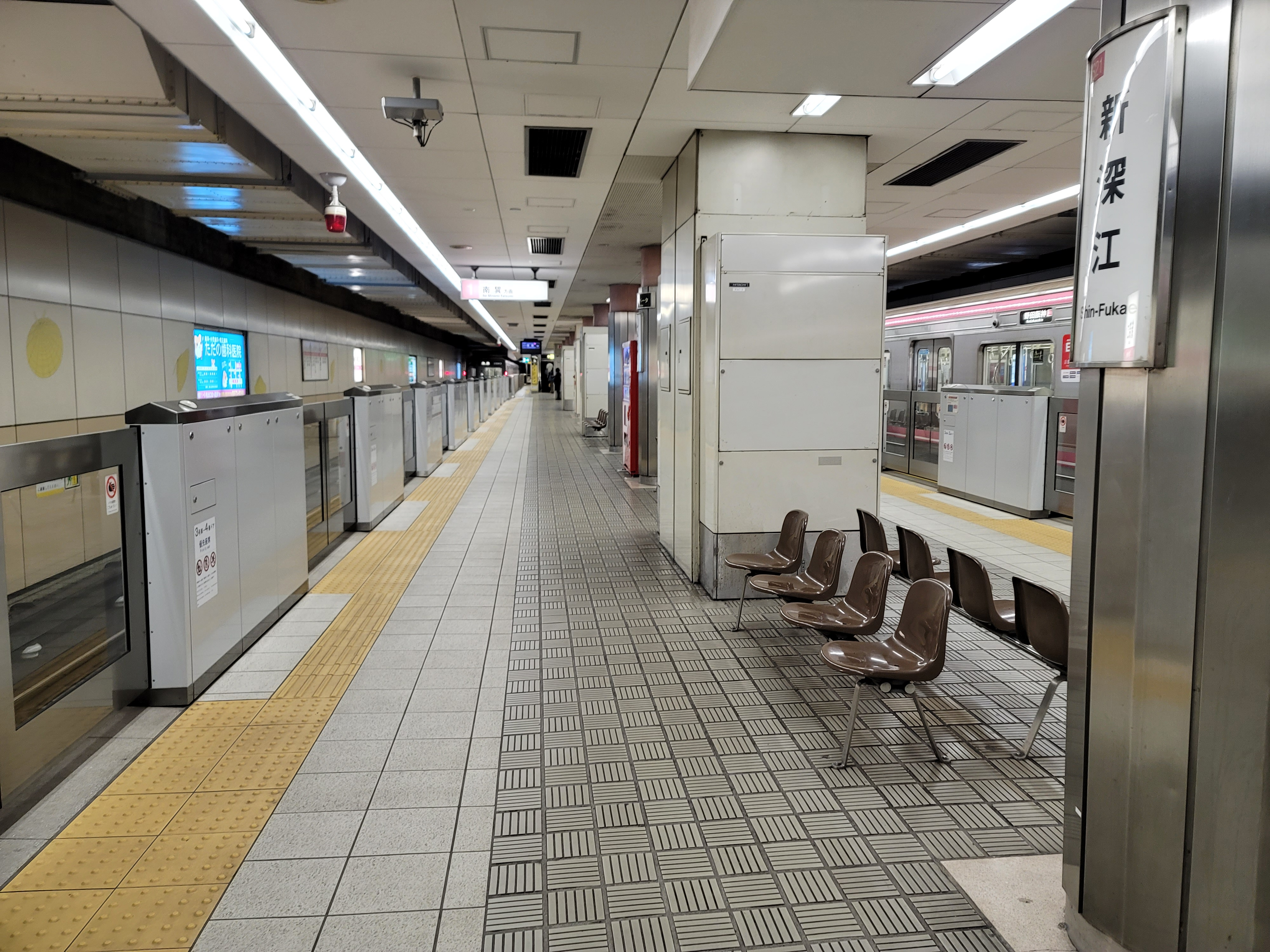
- Platforms

General information
- System: Osaka Metro
- Operator: Osaka Metro
- Line: Sennichimae Line
- Platforms: 1 island platform
- Tracks: 2

Other information
- Station code: S 21

History
- Opened: 10 September 1969; 57 years ago

Services
Preceding station	Osaka Metro	Following station
Imazato S 20 towards Nodahanshin	Sennichimae Line	Shōji S 22 towards Minami-Tatsumi
Location
- Location within Osaka Prefecture Location within Japan

Shin-Fukae Station (新深江駅, Shin-Fukae-eki; station number: S21) is a railway station on the Osaka Metro Sennichimae Line in Higashinari-ku, Osaka, Japan.

== Layout ==
There is an island platform with two tracks on the 2nd basement.

1	■ Sennichimae Line	for Minami-Tatsumi
2	■ Sennichimae Line	for Tsuruhashi, Namba, Awaza and Nodahanshin

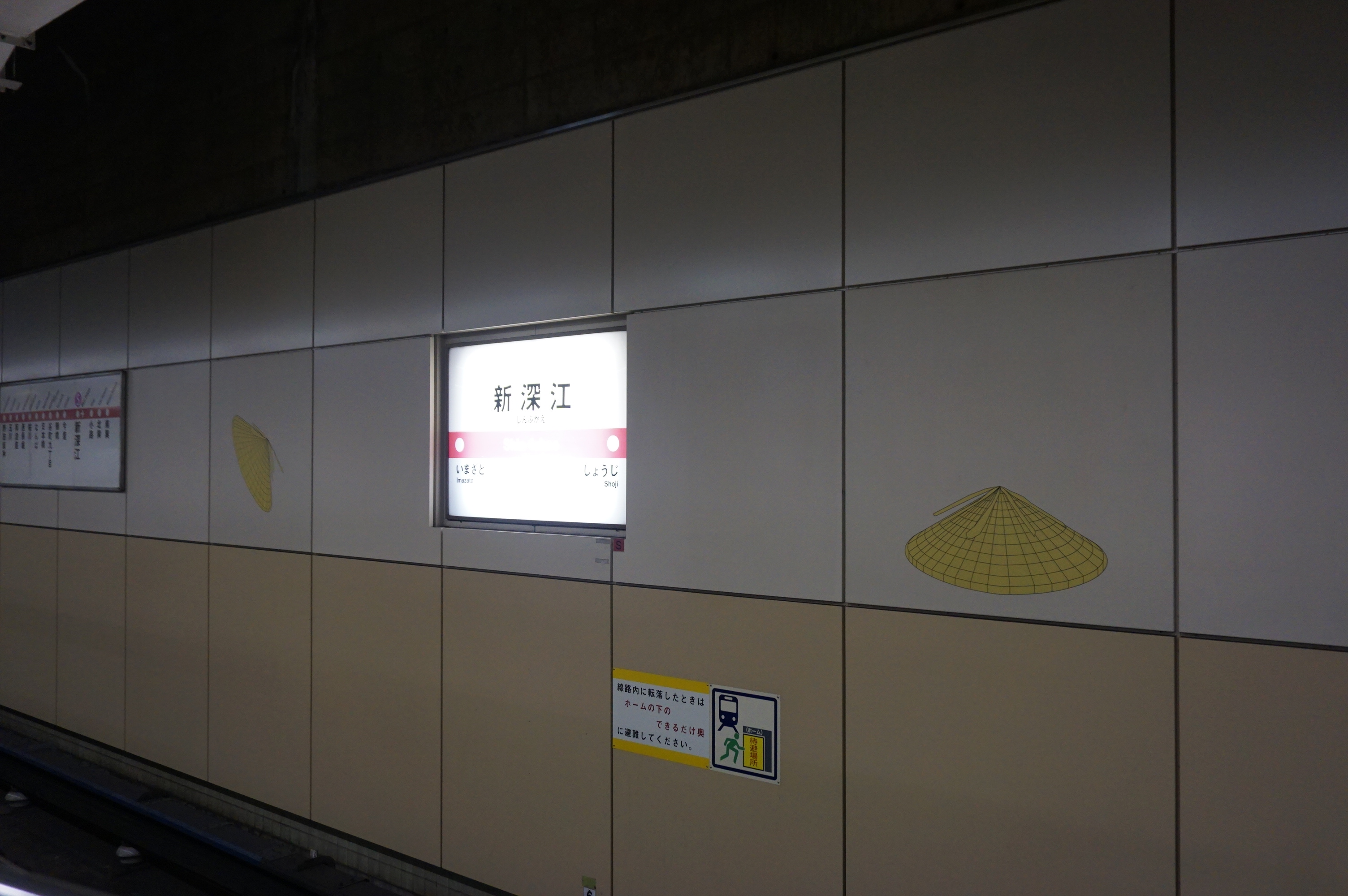
Shinfukae-sugegasa

== Surroundings ==
- National Route 308
- Doggyman H.A. Co., Ltd.
- KOKUYO Co., Ltd.

=== Bus ===
Subway Shin-Fukae (Osaka City Bus)

- Route 86 for Kami-Shinjo-ekimae / for Fuse-ekimae
