= Sakuragawa Station (Osaka) =

Railway station in Japan

Sakuragawa Station 桜川駅

General information
- Location: Naniwa-ku, Osaka （大阪市浪速区） Japan
- Operator: Osaka Metro; Hanshin
- Connections: Bus stop
Route map
Location
- Location within Osaka Prefecture Location within Japan

Sakuragawa Station (桜川駅, Sakuragawa-eki) is a railway station on the Osaka Metro Sennichimae Line and the Hanshin Railway Hanshin Namba Line in Naniwa-ku, Osaka, Japan.

== Lines ==
- Osaka Metro

- Sennichimae Line (Station Number: S15)

- Hanshin Electric Railway

- Hanshin Namba Line (Station Number: HS 42)

== Layout ==
=== Osaka Metro Sennichimae Line ===
Sakuragawa Station 桜川駅
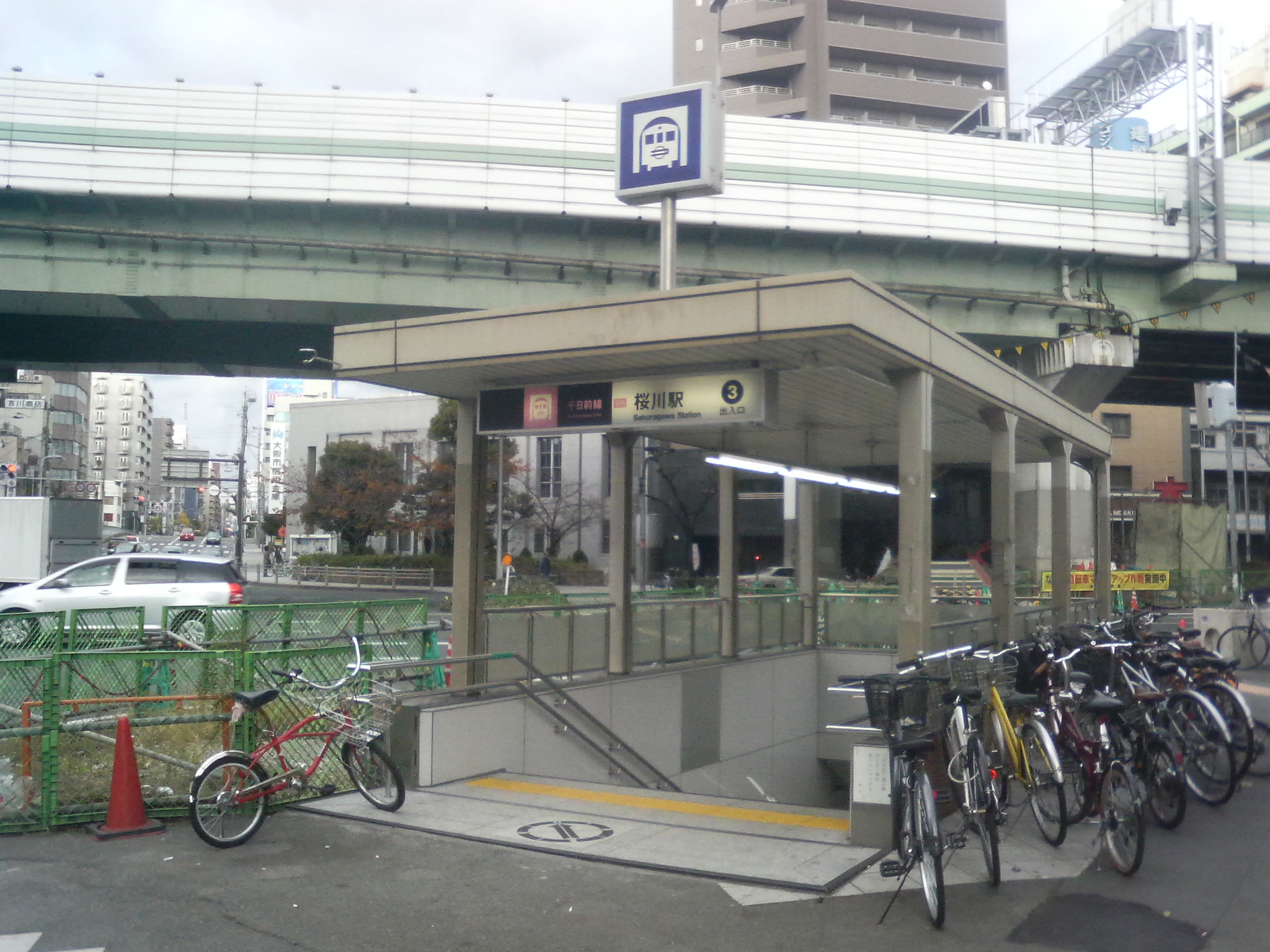
- Exit 3 (2008)

General information
- Location: 3–7, Sakuragawa Nichome, Naniwa, Osaka, Osaka （大阪市浪速区桜川二丁目3–7） Japan
- Coordinates: 34°40′6.42″N 135°29′19.82″E
- System: Osaka Metro
- Operator: Osaka Metro
- Line: Sennichimae Line
- Platforms: 1 island platform
- Tracks: 2
- Connections: Bus stop

Construction
- Structure type: Underground

Other information
- Station code: S 15

History
- Opened: 16 April 1969; 57 years ago

Services
Preceding station	Osaka Metro	Following station
Nishi-Nagahori S 14 towards Nodahanshin	Sennichimae Line	Namba S 16 towards Minami-Tatsumi
Location

- This station has an island platform serving 2 tracks underground.

1	■ Sennichimae Line	for Namba, Tsuruhashi and Minami-Tatsumi
2	■ Sennichimae Line	for Awaza and Nodahanshin

=== Hanshin Railway Hanshin Namba Line ===
Sakuragawa Station 桜川駅
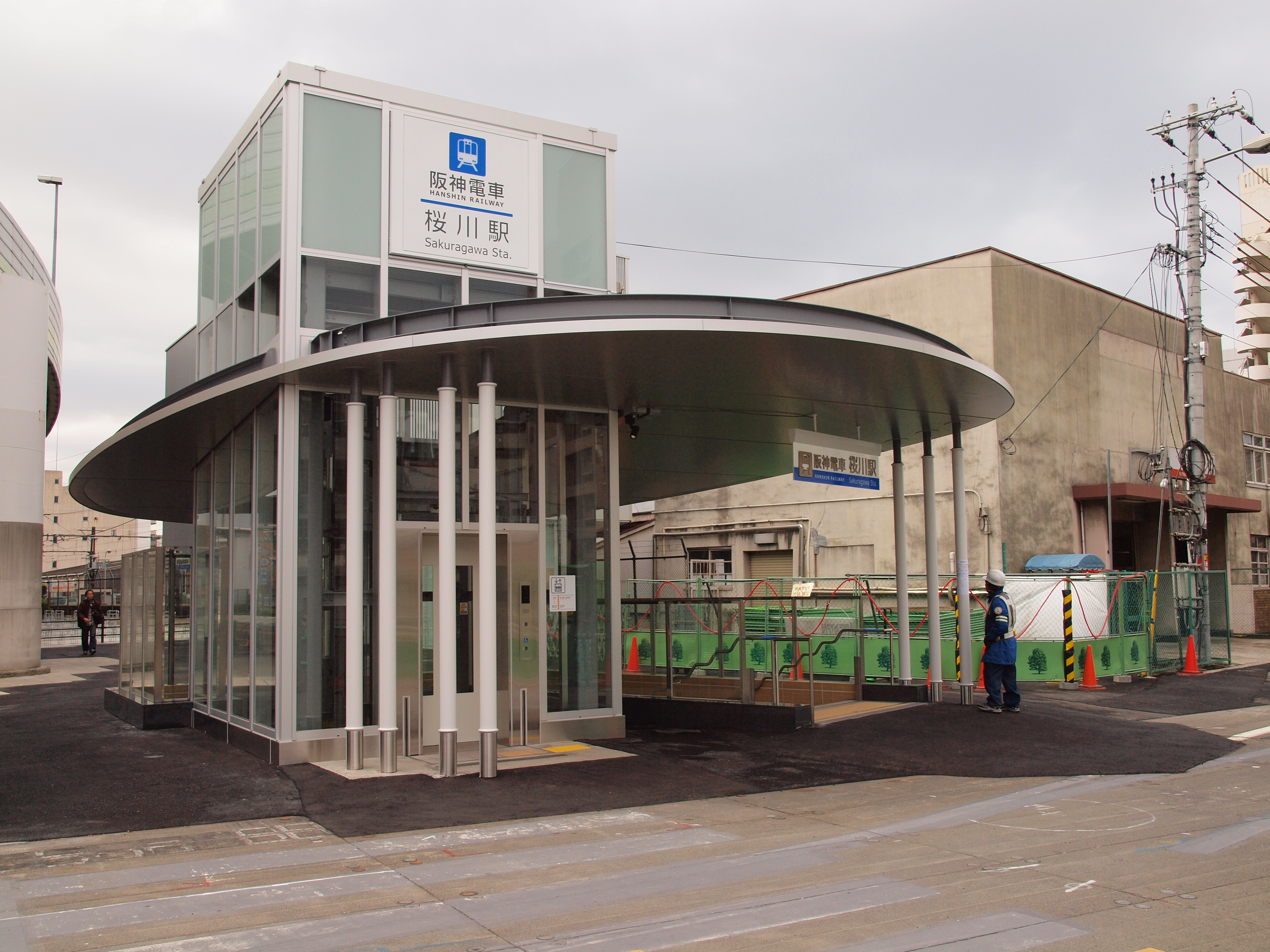
- Sakuragawa station, Hanshin Railway

General information
- Location: Saiwaicho Nichome, Naniwa, Osaka, Osaka （大阪市浪速区幸町二丁目） Japan
- Coordinates: 34°40′6.5″N 135°29′12.02″E
- System: Hanshin station
- Operator: Hanshin
- Line: Hanshin Namba Line

Other information
- Station code: HS 42

History
- Opened: 2009

Services
Preceding station	Hanshin	Following station
Ōsaka Namba HS 41 Terminus	Hanshin Namba Line Local Semi-Express Suburban Semi-Express Rapid Express	Dome-mae HS 43 towards Amagasaki
Location

This station has an island platform serving 2 tracks underground. There are 2 returning tracks for the trains of Kintetsu in the west of the station.

Train crew take turns at operation or conducting between Kintetsu and Hanshin. Trains are operated by Kintetsu crew between this station and Ōsaka Namba Station.

1	■ Hanshin Namba Line	for Ōsaka Namba and Nara
2	■ Hanshin Namba Line	for Amagasaki, Kōshien and Kobe-Sannomiya; Change trains at Amagasaki or Kobe-Sannomiya for Akashi and Himeji

== Surroundings ==
- Shiomibashi Station – Nankai Railway Koya Line (Shiomibashi Branch)
- Naniwa Hospital
- Naniwa-suji
- Nishi-Dotombori River
- Amidaike-suji
