= Noda Station =

Noda Station may refer to either of two railway stations in Osaka, Japan. These are:

- Noda Station (JR West), on the Osaka Loop Line of the West Japan Railway Company
- Noda Station (Hanshin), on the Main Line of the Hanshin Electric Railway
