= Tamagawa Station (Osaka) =

Metro station in Osaka, Japan

Tamagawa Station 玉川駅
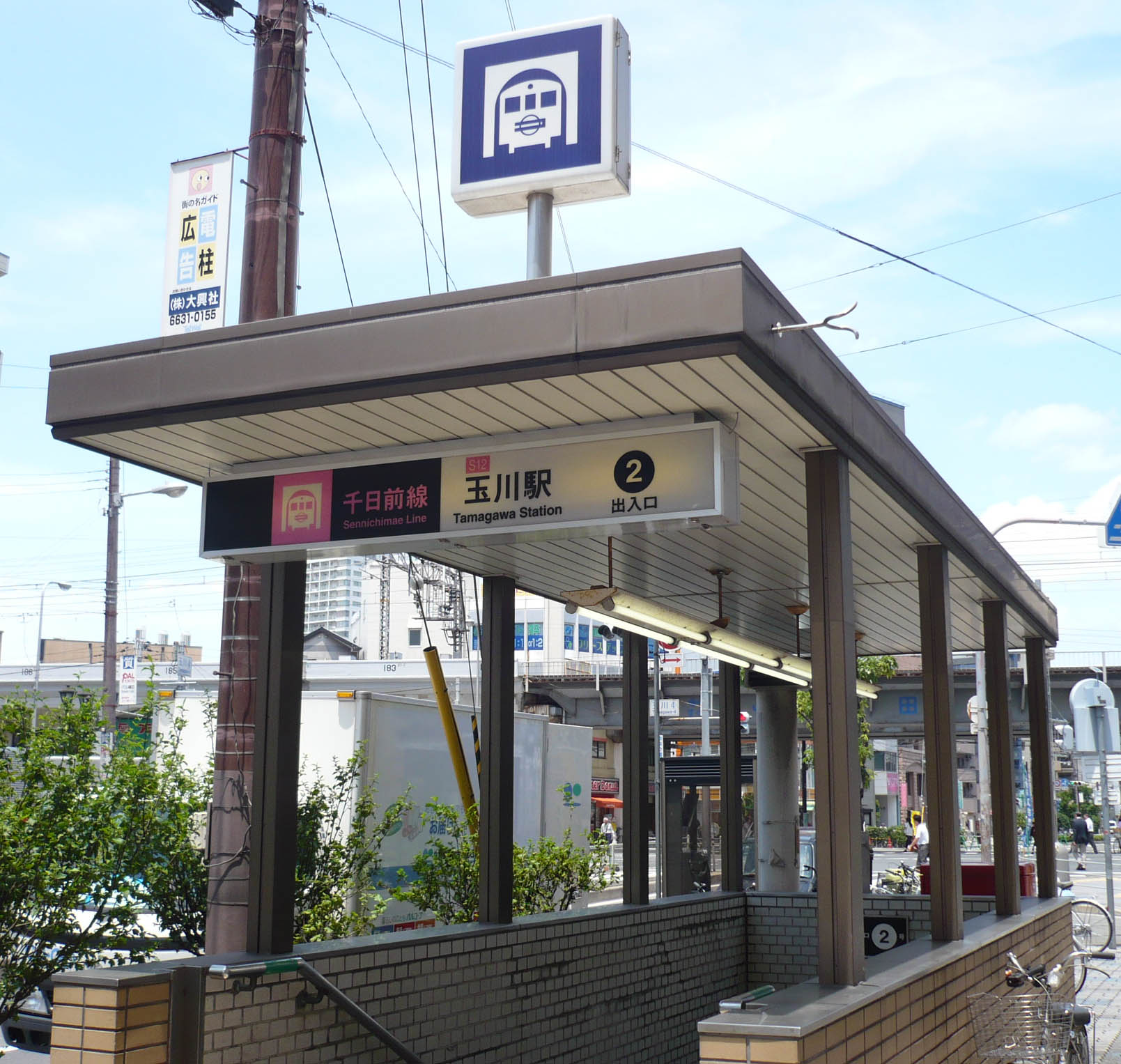
- Entrance to the station

General information
- Location: 1-5, Yoshino 3-chome, Fukushima, Osaka, Osaka （大阪市福島区吉野三丁目1-5） Japan
- Coordinates: 34°41′23″N 135°28′34″E
- System: Osaka Metro
- Operator: Osaka Metro
- Line: Sennichimae Line
- Platforms: 2 side platforms
- Tracks: 2
- Connections: JR West Osaka Loop Line (Noda); Bus stop

Construction
- Structure type: Underground

Other information
- Station code: S 12

History
- Opened: 16 April 1969; 57 years ago

Services
Preceding station	Osaka Metro	Following station
Nodahanshin S 11 Terminus	Sennichimae Line	Awaza S 13 towards Minami-Tatsumi
Location
- Location within Osaka Prefecture Location within Japan

Tamagawa Station (玉川駅, Tamagawa-eki) is a railway station on the Osaka Metro Sennichimae Line in Fukushima-ku, Osaka, Japan. The station is assigned the station number S12.

== Connecting line ==
- Osaka Loop Line (Noda)

== Layout ==
- There are two side platforms with two tracks. Ticket gates are locate on upper level than platforms in the south of the station and same level as platforms in the north on each, thus, there are three ticket gates in total.

1	■ Sennichimae Line	for Namba, Tsuruhashi and Minami-Tatsumi
2	■ Sennichimae Line	to Nodahanshin

== Surroundings ==
- Osaka Municipal Central Wholesale Markets (大阪市中央卸売市場, Ōsaka-shi Chūō Oroshiuri Shijō)
- Osaka Municipal Fukushima Library (大阪市立福島図書館, Ōsaka-shiritsu Fukushima Toshokan)
- Osaka Municipal Yoshino Elementary School (大阪市立吉野小学校, Ōsaka-shiritsu Yoshino Shōgakkō)
