= Sennichimae Line =

Metro line in Osaka prefecture, Japan

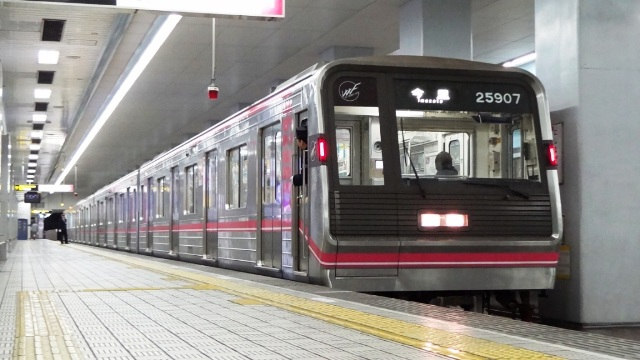
- Sennichimae Line 25 series EMU

Overview
- Line number: 5
- Locale: Osaka
- Termini: Nodahanshin; Minami-Tatsumi
- Stations: 14
- Color on map: Pink (#E44D93)

Service
- Type: Rapid transit
- System: Osaka Metro
- Operator(s): Osaka Metro Co., Ltd. (2018–present); Osaka Municipal Transportation Bureau (1969–2018)
- Depot(s): Morinomiya (located on Chūō Line); Midorigi (located on Yotsubashi Line)
- Rolling stock: 25 series

History
- Opened: 16 April 1969; 57 years ago
- Last extension: 1981

Technical
- Line length: 12.6 km (7.8 mi)
- Track length: 13.1 km (8.1 mi)
- Number of tracks: Double-track
- Track gauge: 1,435 mm (4 ft 8 1/2 in) standard gauge
- Electrification: 750 V DC (third rail)
- Operating speed: 70 km/h (43 mph)
- Signalling: Cab signalling
- Train protection system: CS-ATC, ATO
Route map

The Sennichimae Line (千日前線, Sennichimae-sen) is an underground rapid transit line in Osaka, Japan. It is one of the lines of Osaka Metro. It links the northwestern district of Fukushima-ku and the southeastern district of Ikuno-ku with the central commercial and entertainment district of Namba.

The line is paralleled by the underground Kintetsu Namba Line/Hanshin Namba Line connection line in its central section. Its official name is Rapid Electric Tramway Line No. 5 (高速電気軌道第5号線), while the Osaka Municipal Transportation Bureau refers to it as Osaka City Rapid Railway Line No. 5 (大阪市高速鉄道第5号線), and in MLIT publications, it is written as Line No. 5 (Sennichimae Line) (5号線（千日前線）). Station numbers are indicated by the letter S.

Platform screen doors are located at all of the stations. The first station, Minami-Tatsumi, had them installed on March 14, 2014 and operation started in April. The final station, Nodahanshin, had them installed and operating in December. All platforms are long enough for eight-car trains however a part of each platform has been blocked off, since only four-car trains are needed to carry the amount of traffic on the line. In 2013 the line carried on average 181,238 passengers per day.

== History ==
According to the original plans for the Sennichimae Line from 1948 (initially as Line 4A, as it was intended to branch off from the Chūō Line) it was meant to run from the lower bank of the Kanzaki River to Hirano-ku.

- 16 April 1969 – Nodahanshin – Sakuragawa (opening)
- 25 July 1969 – Tanimachi Kyūchōme – Imazato (opening)
- 10 September 1969 – Imazato – Shin-Fukae (opening)
- 11 March 1970 – Sakuragawa – Tanimachi Kyūchōme (opening)
- 2 December 1981 – Shin-Fukae – Minami-Tatsumi (opening)

=== Future plans ===
A southeastern extension to Mito Station in Higashiōsaka has been proposed since 1989.

== Stations ==
All stations are in Osaka.

No.	Station	Japanese	Distance (km)	Transfers	Location
S 11	Nodahanshin	野田阪神	0.0	Hanshin: Main Line – Noda; H JR Tōzai Line – Ebie	Fukushima-ku
S 12	Tamagawa	玉川	0.6	O Osaka Loop Line – Noda	Fukushima-ku
S 13	Awaza	阿波座	1.9	Chūō Line (C15)	Nishi-ku
S 14	Nishi-Nagahori	西長堀	2.9	Nagahori Tsurumi-ryokuchi Line (N13)	Nishi-ku
S 15	Sakuragawa	桜川	3.8	Hanshin: Hanshin Namba Line	Naniwa-ku
S 16	Namba	難波・なんば	4.9	Midōsuji Line (M20); Yotsubashi Line (Y15); Nankai: Nankai Main Line, Koya Line; A Kintetsu Namba Line – Ōsaka Namba; Hanshin: Hanshin Namba Line – Ōsaka Namba; Q Yamatoji Line (Kansai Line)	Chūō-ku
S 17	Nippombashi	日本橋	5.6	Sakaisuji Line (K17); A Kintetsu Namba Line – Kintetsu Nippombashi	Chūō-ku
S 18	Tanimachi Kyūchōme	谷町九丁目	6.6	Tanimachi Line (T25); D Osaka Line; A Kintetsu-Namba Line; A Nara Line – Osaka Uehommachi	Tennōji-ku
S 19	Tsuruhashi	鶴橋	7.7	O Osaka Loop Line; D Osaka Line; A Kintetsu-Nara Line	Tennōji-ku
S 20	Imazato	今里	9.2	Imazatosuji Line (I21)	Higashinari-ku
S 21	Shin-Fukae	新深江	10.1		Higashinari-ku
S 22	Shōji	小路	11.1		Ikuno-ku
S 23	Kita-Tatsumi	北巽	12.0		Ikuno-ku
S 24	Minami-Tatsumi	南巽	13.1		Ikuno-ku

== Rolling stock ==
=== Current ===
- 25 series (since 1991)

Since 2015, all Sennichimae Line trains support automatic train operation (ATO) with one-person operation as fallback. ATO was previously trialled on the Sennichimae Line between October 1973 and July 1974.

Until 2011, the Sennichimae Line had a depot near Imazato station. Nowadays, Sennichimae Line rolling stock are stored at Morinomiya Depot on the Chūō Line where it is linked via a connecting track at Awaza. Since 2016, the regular inspection of the trains used on the third rail lines of Osaka Metro has been consolidated at Midorigi Depot on the Yotsubashi Line, so a new spur track has been constructed near Hommachi Station for Sennichimae Line trains to access Midorigi Depot.

=== Former ===
- 50 series (1969–1994)
- 100 series (later version) (1979–1989)
- 30 series (1991–1995)
