= Kita-Tatsumi Station =

Metro station in Osaka, Japan

Coordinates: 34°39′11″N 135°33′18″E

Kita-Tatsumi Station 北巽駅
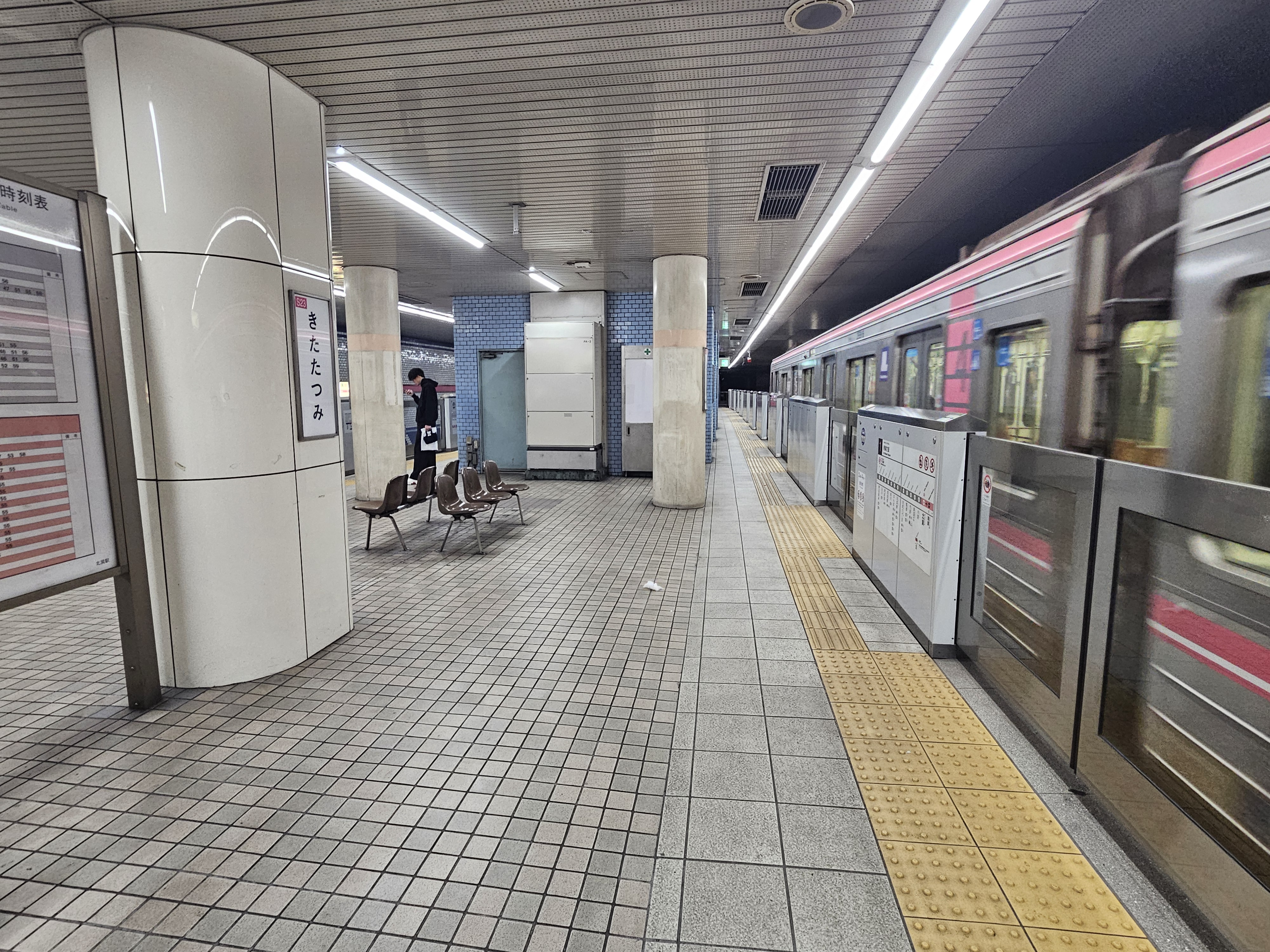
- Station platform

General information
- Location: Tatsumihigashi; Ikuno-ku, Osaka, Osaka Prefecture; Japan
- System: Osaka Metro
- Operator: Osaka Metro
- Line: Sennichimae Line
- Platforms: 1 island platform
- Tracks: 2

Other information
- Station code: S 23

History
- Opened: 2 December 1981; 44 years ago

Services
Preceding station	Osaka Metro	Following station
Shōji S 22 towards Nodahanshin	Sennichimae Line	Minami-Tatsumi S 24 Terminus
Location
- Location within Osaka Prefecture Location within Japan

Kita-Tatsumi Station (北巽駅, Kita-Tatsumi-eki) is a railway station on the Osaka Metro Sennichimae Line (Station Number: S23) in Ikuno-ku, Osaka, Japan.

== Layout ==
- There is an island platform with two tracks underground.

1	■ Sennichimae Line	to Minami-Tatsumi
2	■ Sennichimae Line	for Tsuruhashi, Namba, Awaza and Nodahanshin

== Surroundings ==
- the headquarters of Rohto Pharmaceutical Co.
- Yoshinoya
- Gyoza Osho
- McDonald's

=== Bus routes ===
Buses are operated by Osaka City Bus.

Kita-Tatsumi Bus Terminal
- Bus stop 1
  - Route 18 for Tamatsukuri via Uehommachi Rokuchome
- Bus stop 2
  - Route 13 for Abenobashi via Oikebashi and Shariji
Subway Kita-Tatsumi
- Route 19 for Kami-higashi Sanchome-kita via Subway Minami-Tatsumi and JR Hirano / for Subway Imazato via Ikuno Chuo Byoin
