= Hōzen-ji (Osaka) =

Jōdo-shū Buddhist temple

Coordinates: 34°40′04″N 135°30′09″E

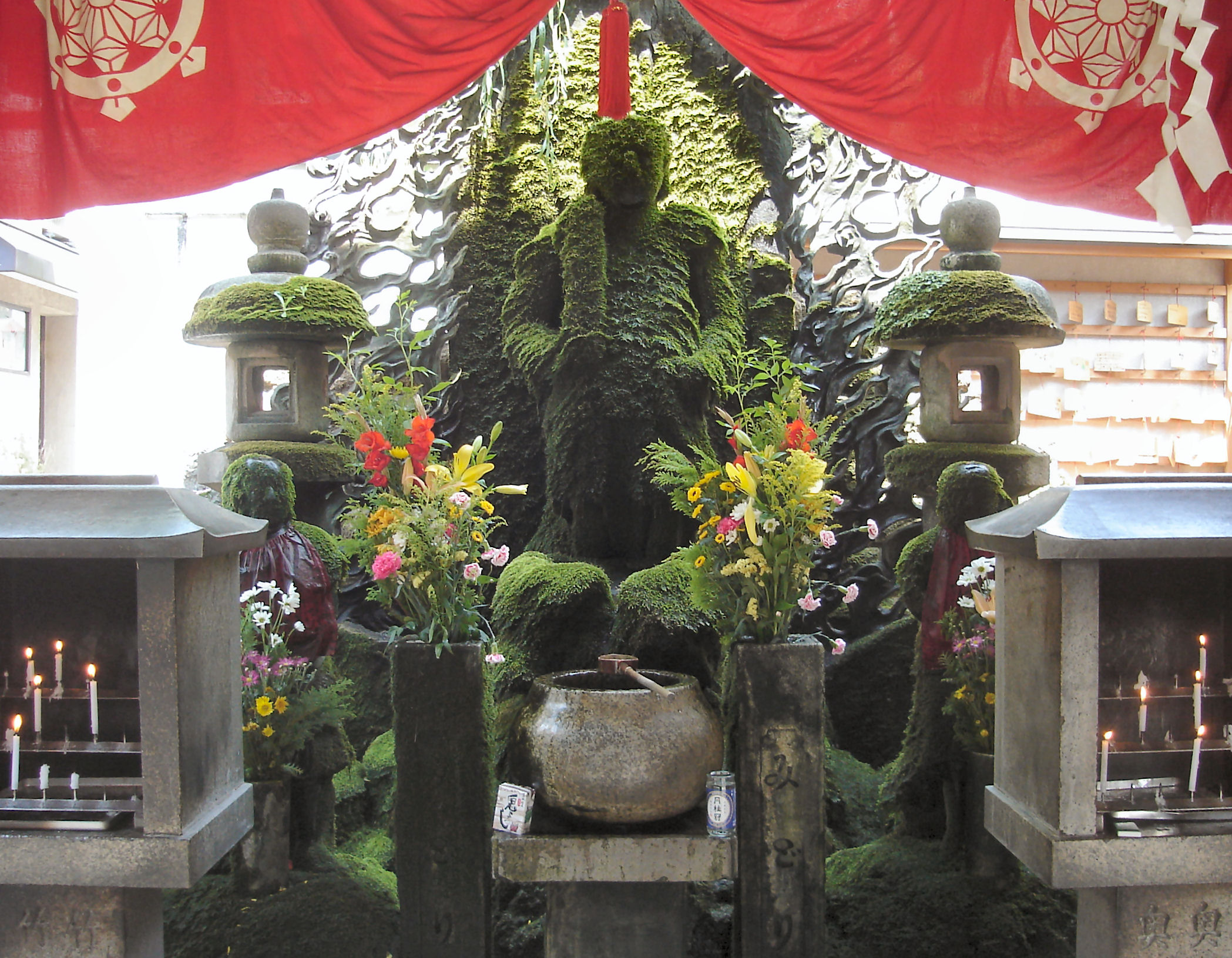
The statue of Fudō Myōō covered in moss.

Hōzen-ji (法善寺) is a Buddhist temple of the Jōdo-shū sect in Chūō-ku, Osaka, Japan. The temple is located in the Dotonbori district, near Namba Station. It has a reputation in Japan for helping women who are about to give birth.

== History ==
The temple was founded in 1637. Located in the middle of a district of theaters and other performance venues, it was frequented by actors and other artists. Shows were regularly given there in tents.

Except for one statue, it was completely destroyed during the bombings of 1945. The statue of Fudō Myōō is known for its unusual appearance: it is entirely covered in moss. Pouring water on the statue, known as "Mizukake Fudo", is a good luck gesture according to tradition.
