= Noda Station (Hanshin) =

Railway station in Osaka, Japan

Coordinates: 34°41′39.72″N 135°28′33.91″E

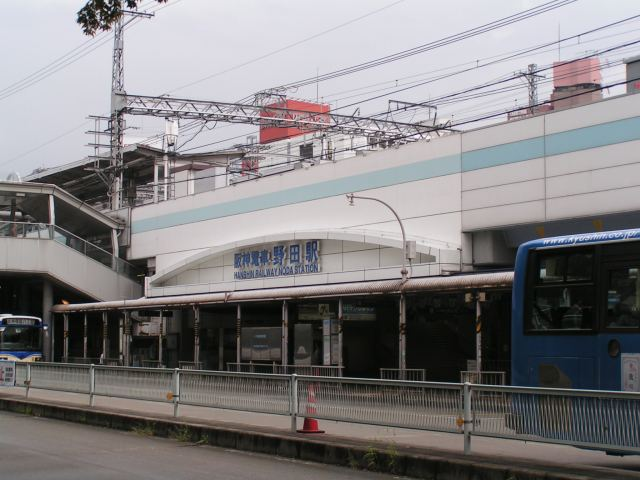
Noda Station

Noda Station (野田駅, Noda-eki) is a railway station on the Hanshin Electric Railway Main Line in Fukushima-ku, Osaka, Japan. The headquarters of Hanshin Electric Railway Co., Ltd. is located in the north of the Station.

== Connecting lines from Noda on the Hanshin Railway Main Line ==
- Osaka Metro Sennichimae Line (S11: Nodahanshin)
- West Japan Railway Company (JR West) JR Tōzai Line (Ebie)

== Layout ==
- There are 2 elevated island platforms with 2 tracks each.

1, 2	■ ■Main Line	for Umeda
3, 4	■ ■Main Line	for Amagasaki, Koshien, Kobe Sannomiya, Akashi, and Himeji

== Surroundings ==
- the headquarters of Hanshin Electric Railway Co., Ltd.
- WISTE
- Osaka Municipal Fukushima Library

== Adjacent stations ==
«	Service	»
Main Line (HS 03)
Fukushima (HS 02)	Local	Yodogawa (HS 04)
Fukushima (HS 02)	Morning Express	Chibune (HS 06)
Osaka-Umeda (HS 01)	Express	Amagasaki (HS 09)
Osaka-Umeda (HS 01)	Morning Limited Express (Osaka-Umeda-bound trains only on weekdays)	Amagasaki (HS 09)
Limited Express; Through Limited Express: Does not stop at this station
