= Noda Station (JR West) =

Railway station in Osaka, Japan

Coordinates: 34°41′20.33″N 135°28′29.49″E

Noda Station 野田駅
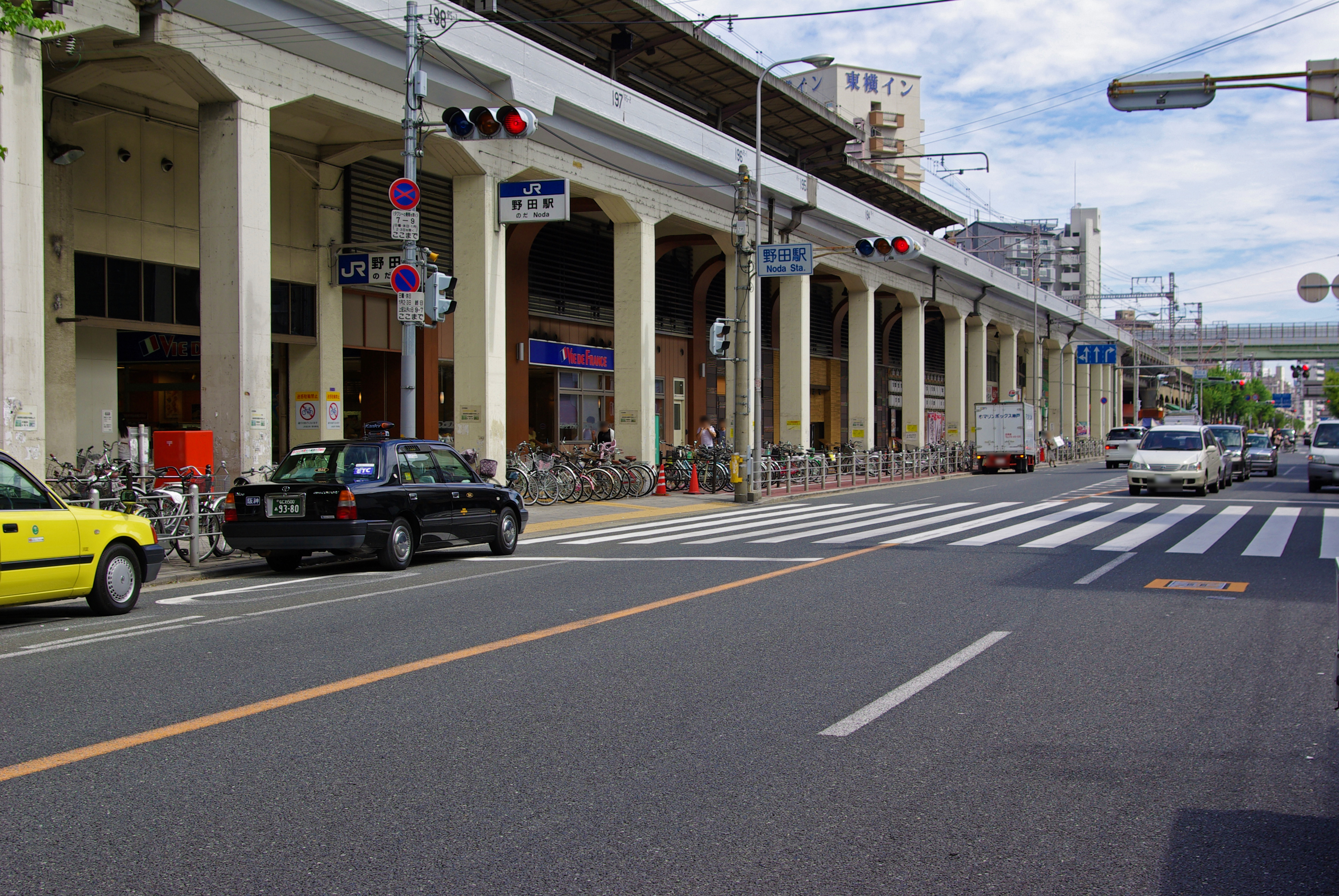
- Signs with station name are seen under the elevated platform.

General information
- Location: Fukushima, Osaka, Osaka Prefecture, Japan
- Operator: JR West
- Line: Osaka Loop Line

Construction
- Structure type: Elevated

Other information
- Station code: JR-O13

History
- Opened: 5 April 1898
Location

Noda Station (野田駅, Noda-eki) is a railway station in Fukushima-ku, Osaka, Japan, on the JR West Osaka Loop Line. The Station is connected to Tamagawa Station (S12) on the Osaka Metro Sennichimae Line.

== Layout ==
There is an island platform with two tracks elevated.

1	■ Osaka Loop Line	inner track for Nishikujo, Shin-Imamiya and Universal City
2	■ Osaka Loop Line	outer track for Osaka and Kyobashi

== History ==
The station opened on 5 April 1898.

Station numbering was introduced in March 2018 with Teradacho being assigned station number JR-O13.

== Surrounding area ==
- Osaka Municipal Central Wholesale Markets (大阪市中央卸売市場)

== Adjacent stations ==
«	Service	»
Osaka Loop Line
Fukushima	Local	Nishikujo
Fukushima	Regional Rapid Service	Nishikujo
Fukushima	Direct Rapid Service (Clockwise trains only)	Nishikujo
Yamatoji Rapid Service: Does not stop at this station
Rapid Service: Does not stop at this station
Kansai Airport Rapid Service: Does not stop at this station
Kishuji Rapid Service: Does not stop at this station
Limited Express Kuroshio: Does not stop at this station
Limited Express Haruka: Does not stop at this station
