= Tsuruhashi Station =

Railway station in Osaka, Japan

Tsuruhashi Station 鶴橋駅

General information
- Location: Osaka City, Osaka Prefecture; Japan
- Operator: Kintetsu Railway; JR West; Osaka Metro
Location
- Location within Osaka Prefecture Location within Kansai region Location within Japan

Tsuruhashi Station (鶴橋駅, Tsuruhashi-eki) is a railway station complex in the Tsuruhashi district of Ikuno-ku and Tennoji-ku, Osaka, Japan. It is served by the JR West Osaka Loop Line, the Kintetsu Nara Line, and the Osaka Metro Sennichimae Line.

== Kintetsu Railway ==
Tsuruhashi Station 鶴橋駅
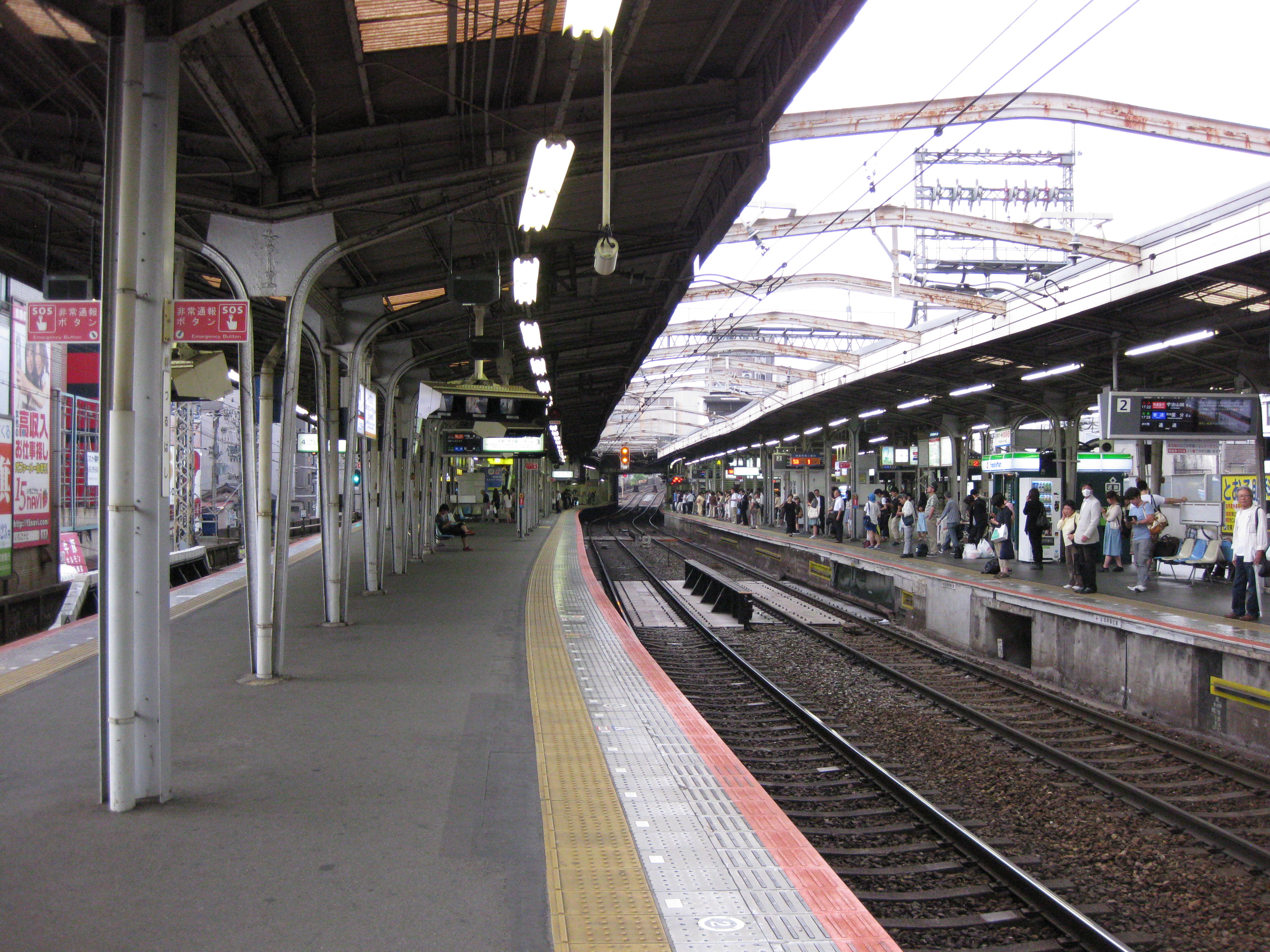
- Platform (June 2014)

General information
- Location: 2-1-20, Tsuruhashi, Ikuno Ward, Osaka City, Osaka Prefecture （大阪府大阪市生野区鶴橋二丁目1-20） Japan
- Coordinates: 34°39′55.25″N 135°31′52.67″E
- System: Kintetsu Railway station
- Operator: Kintetsu Railway
- Lines: A Nara Line; D Osaka Line
- Platforms: 2 island platforms
- Tracks: 4

Construction
- Structure type: Elevated

Other information
- Station code: A04; D04

History
- Opened: 30 April 1914; 112 years ago

Passengers
- FY2021: 124,506 daily
Track layout
Location

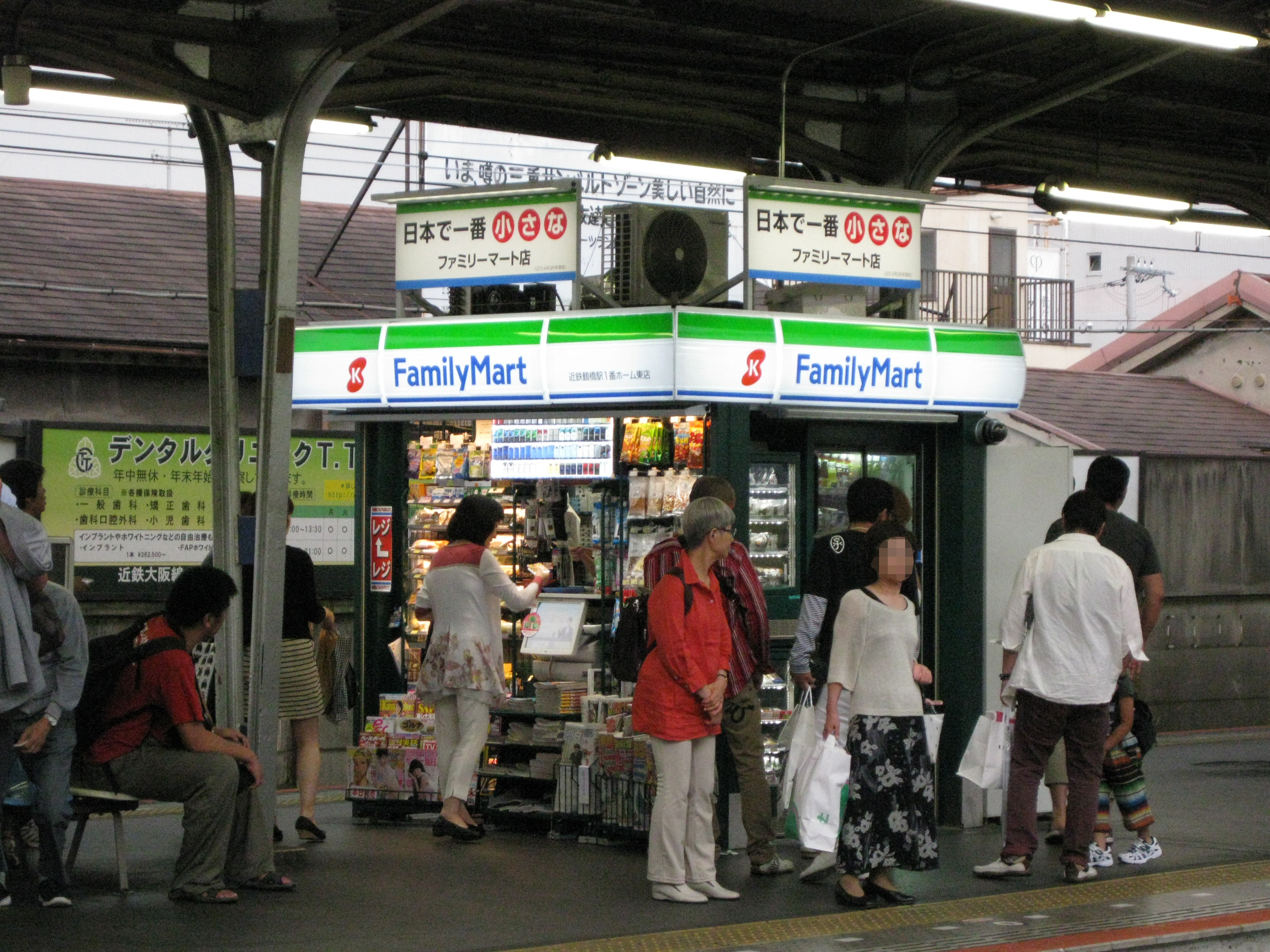
The smallest FamilyMart in Japan (The shop is located on the platform for Nara-bound and Ise-bound trains.)

This station has a stationmaster and administrates itself and Imazato Station.

=== Layout ===
The station on the Kintetsu lines has two island platforms serving four tracks on the second level. The platforms enable passengers to change trains between the Nara Line and the Osaka Line (cross-platform interchange).

1	■ Limited express trains from Ōsaka Namba	for Nagoya / for Ise-Shima / for Nara
1	■ Nara Line	Eastbound trains for Higashi-Hanazono, Yamato-Saidaiji, and Nara
2	■ Limited express trains from Osaka Uehommachi	for Ise-Shima
2	■ Osaka Line	Eastbound trains for Kawachi-Kokubu, Yamato-Yagi and Nabari / for Ise-Shima
3	■ Nara Line	Westbound trains for Ōsaka Namba, (Hanshin Namba Line) Amagasaki, and Kobe Sannomiya
4	■ Osaka Line	Westbound trains terminating at Osaka Uehommachi

=== Adjacent stations ===
«	Service	»
Osaka Line (D04)
Ōsaka Uehommachi (D03)	Local	Imazato (D05)
Ōsaka Uehommachi	Semi-Express; Suburban Semi-Express	Fuse (D06)
Ōsaka Uehommachi (D03)	Express	Fuse (D06)
Ōsaka Uehommachi (D03)	Rapid Express	Goidō (D23)
Ōsaka Uehommachi (D03)	Limited Express (Nagoya - Ōsaka)	Yamato-Yagi (D39); Tsu (E39)
Ōsaka Uehommachi (D03)	Limited Express (Ōsaka - Ise-Shima)	Fuse (D06) (Ōsaka Uehommachi - Ujiyamada, Toba） Yamato-Takada (D25) (Ōsaka Namba, Ōsaka Uehommachi - Kashikojima / Ōsaka Namba - Nabari, Matsusaka, Toba); Yamato-Yagi (D39) (Ōsaka Uehommachi - Ujiyamada, Toba); Iseshi (M73) (Ōsaka Namba - Kashikojima) (Non stop)
Ōsaka Uehommachi (D03)	Limited Express "Shimakaze"	Yamato-Yagi (D39)
Nara Line (A04)
Ōsaka Uehommachi (A03)	Local	Imazato (A05)
Ōsaka Uehommachi (A03)	Semi-Express; Suburban Semi-Express	Fuse (A06)
Ōsaka Uehommachi (A03)	Express	Fuse (A06)
Ōsaka Uehommachi (A03)	Rapid Express	Ikoma (A17)
Ōsaka Uehommachi (A03)	Limited Express (Ōsaka - Nara)	Ikoma (A17)

=== History ===
The Kintetsu platform featured what was once the smallest FamilyMart store in Japan. It closed down in June 2022.

== West Japan Railway Company ==
Tsuruhashi Station 鶴橋駅
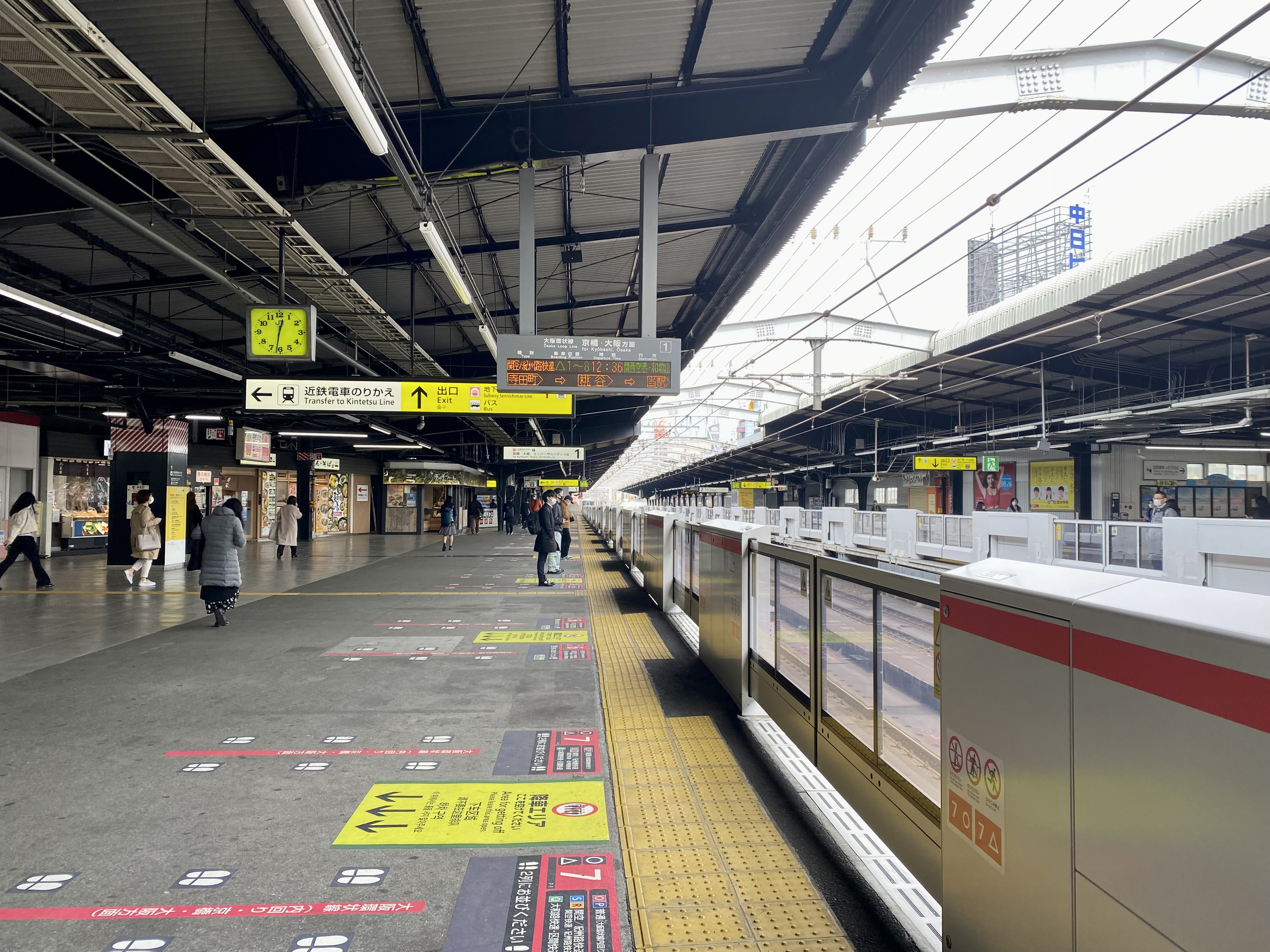
- platform

General information
- Location: 1-1, Shimoajihara-cho, Tennōji Ward, Osaka City; Osaka Prefecture; Japan
- Coordinates: 34°39′54.89″N 135°31′47.73″E
- Operator: JR West
- Line: O Osaka Loop Line
- Platforms: 2 side platforms
- Tracks: 2

Construction
- Structure type: Elevated

Other information
- Station code: JR-O04

History
- Opened: 21 September 1932; 93 years ago

Passengers
- FY2020: 67,340 daily

Services
Preceding station	JR West	Following station
Momodani towards Tennōji	Osaka Loop Line	Tamatsukuri towards Shin-Imamiya
Track layout
Location

This station has a stationmaster and administrates Teradacho, Momodani, Tamatsukuri and Morinomiya stations.

=== Layout ===
The station on the Osaka Loop Line has two side platforms serving two tracks on the third floor, over the western side of the platforms and tracks for the Kintetsu lines.

1	■ Osaka Loop Line	Counterclockwise trains for Kyōbashi, Osaka and Universal City
2	■ Osaka Loop Line	Clockwise trains for Tennōji and Shin-Imamiya

=== History ===
Station numbering was introduced in March 2018 with Tsuruhashi being assigned station number JR-O04.

== Osaka Metro Sennichimae Line ==
Tsuruhashi Station 鶴橋駅
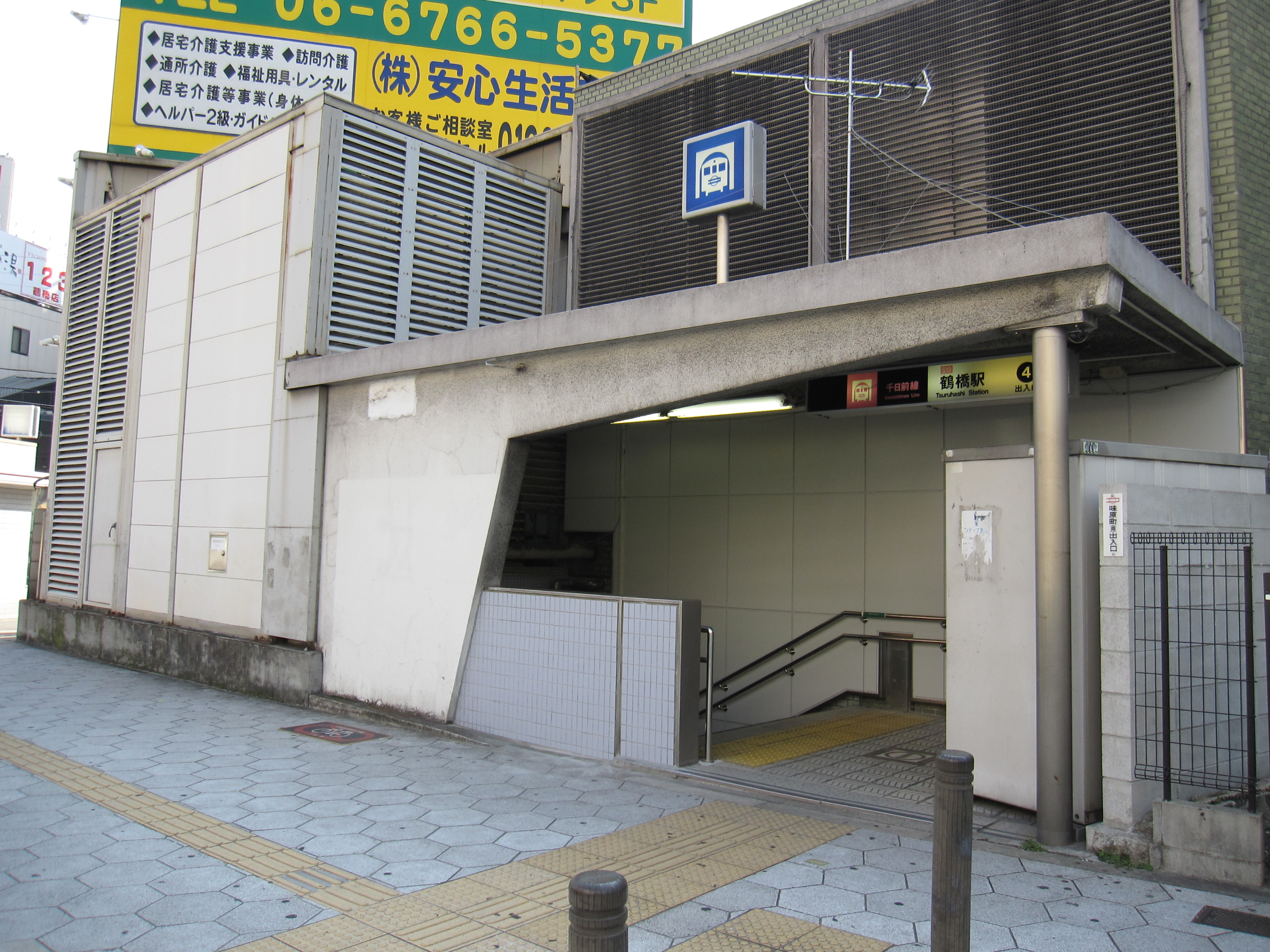
- Exit 4

General information
- Location: 1-24, Shimoajihara-cho, Tennoji-ku, Osaka, Osaka Prefecture （大阪市天王寺区下味原町1-24） Japan
- Coordinates: 34°39′57.64″N 135°31′47.51″E
- System: Osaka Metro
- Operator: Osaka Metro
- Line: Sennichimae Line
- Platforms: 1 island platform
- Tracks: 2

Construction
- Structure type: Underground

Other information
- Station code: S 19

History
- Opened: 25 July 1969; 57 years ago

Services
Preceding station	Osaka Metro	Following station
Tanimachi Kyūchōme S 18 towards Nodahanshin	Sennichimae Line	Imazato S 20 towards Minami-Tatsumi
Track layout
Location

=== Layout ===
The station on the Sennichimae Line has an island platform serving two tracks on the second basement and fenced with platform gates.

1	■ Sennichimae Line	Eastbound trains for Minami-Tatsumi
2	■ Sennichimae Line	Westbound trains for Namba, Awaza and Nodahanshin

== Surrounding area ==
The surrounding area of Osaka is well known for its bulgogi (Korean-style barbecue) restaurants and other Korean goods. Many stalls selling Korean wedding dresses, bootleg items, fruits, vegetables, and kimchi are located under the tracks.

The Tsuruhashi and Ikuno-ku districts are well known for the large number of Zainichi Korean living there. Many families from Korea have lived in the Tsuruhashi district for three generations or more.

== Establishments around the station ==
- Miyukimori Shopping Street
- Tsuruhashi Market
- Osaka Red Cross Hospital (大阪赤十字病院)

=== Buses ===
Tsuruhashi-ekimae (Osaka City Bus)
- Route 18: for Tamatsukuri via Uehommachi Rokuchome / for Kita-Tatsumi Bus Terminal via Miyukidori
- Route 22: for Abenobashi via Uehommachi Rokuchome and Tennoji Kumin Center / for Suwa Jinja-mae via Tamatsukuri
- Route 73: for Namba / for Deto Bus Terminal via Katsuyama Yonchome and Kumata

== See also ==
- List of railway stations in Japan
