= Namba Station =

Railway and metro station in Osaka, Japan

Namba Station なんば駅

General information
- Location: Osaka, Osaka; Japan
- Operator: Nankai Electric Railway; Osaka Metro
- Connections: Bus stop Taxi stand Ōsaka Namba Station; JR Namba Station

History
- Opened: 1935
Location
- Location within Osaka Prefecture Location within Japan

Namba Station (難波駅, なんば駅, Nanba-eki) is a name shared by two physically separated railway stations in the Namba district of Chūō-ku, Osaka, Japan, operated by Nankai Electric Railway and the Osaka Metro. The name "Namba Station" can also refer to the entire station complex as a whole, including the similarly named JR Namba Station and Ōsaka Namba Station.

The names of both stations are written in hiragana on signage within the stations, because the kanji "難波" can be also read "Naniwa". However, the names of both stations officially employs kanji, printed on train tickets.

== Lines ==
- Nankai Electric Railway (NK01)
  - Nankai Main Line
  - Nankai Koya Line
- Osaka Metro
  - Midōsuji Line (M20)
  - Sennichimae Line (S16)
  - Yotsubashi Line (Y15)

Connecting Stations

- Ōsaka Namba Station (renamed from Kintetsu Namba Station in 2009)
  - Kintetsu Namba Line
  - Hanshin Namba Line
- JR West
  - JR Namba Station (renamed from Minatomachi Station in 1994)
  - Kansai Main Line (Yamatoji Line)

== Nankai Electric Railway ==
Namba Station なんば駅
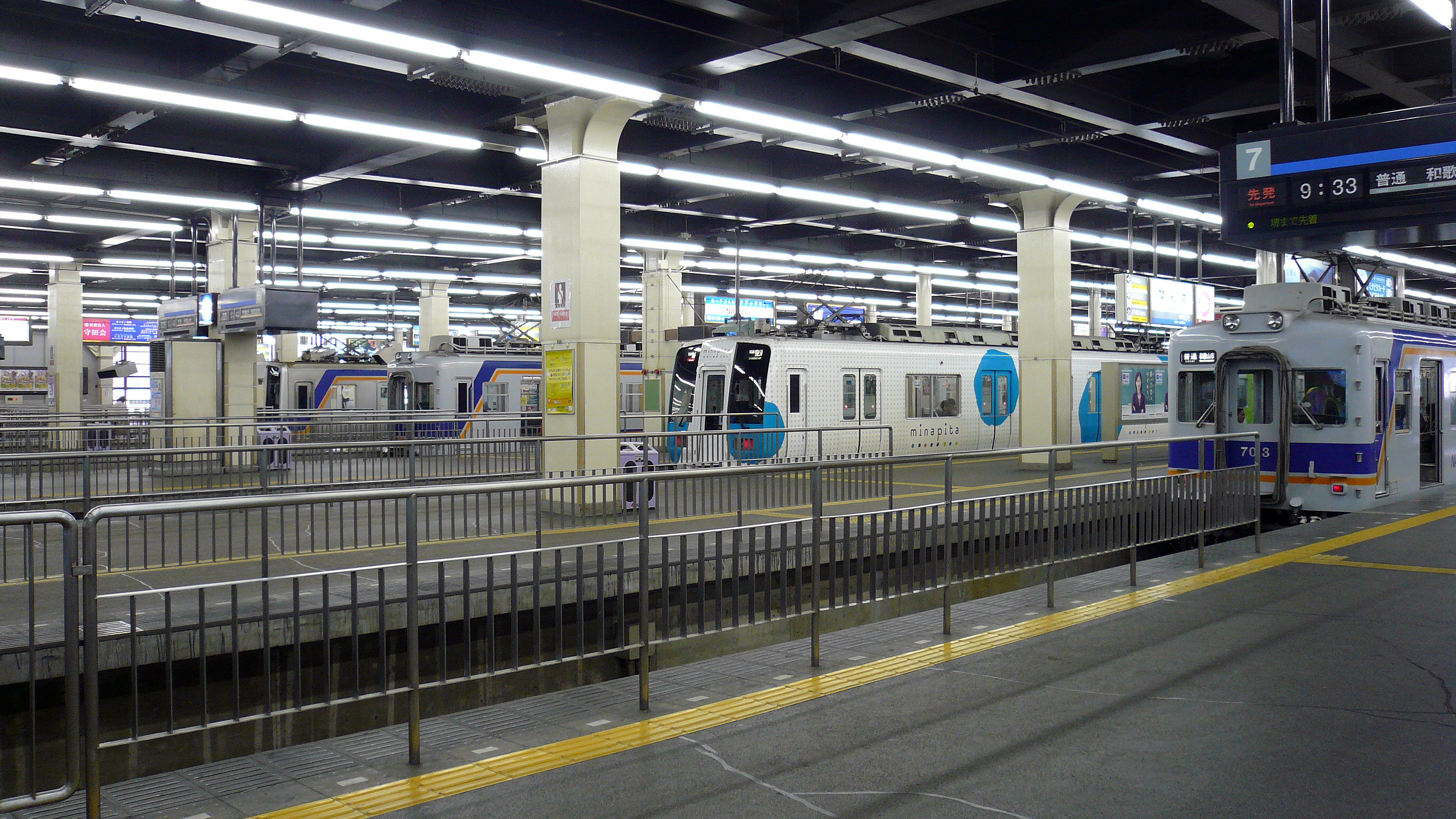
- Nankai station platforms, with several trains waiting at different platforms

General information
- Location: 1-60, Namba Gochōme, Chūō, Osaka, Osaka （大阪市中央区難波五丁目1-60） Japan
- Coordinates: 34°39′48.28″N 135°30′6.88″E
- System: Nankai Electric Railway station
- Operator: Nankai Electric Railway
- Lines: Nankai Main Line; Kōya Line
- Platforms: 16 (9 bay platforms)
- Tracks: 9
- Connections: Bus stop Taxi stand Ōsaka Namba Station; JR Namba Station

Other information
- Station code: NK01

History
- Opened: 29 December 1885; 140 years ago
Services
Preceding station	Nankai Electric Railway	Following station
Terminus	Rapi:t	Shin-Imamiya NK03 towards Kansai Airport
Terminus	Southern	Shin-Imamiya NK03 towards Wakayamashi or Wakayamakō
Terminus	Nankai Main Line Express Sub. Express Local	Shin-Imamiya NK03 towards Wakayamashi
Terminus	Nankai Main Line Airport Express	Shin-Imamiya NK03 towards Kansai Airport
Terminus	Nankai Main Line Semi-Express	Shin-Imamiya NK03 One-way operation
Terminus	Kōya	Shin-Imamiya NK03 towards Gokurakubashi
Terminus	Rinkan	Shin-Imamiya NK03 towards Hashimoto
Terminus	Semboku Liner	Shin-Imamiya NK03 towards Izumi-Chūō
Terminus	Kōya Line Rapid Express Express Sub. Express Semi-Express	Shin-Imamiya NK03 towards Gokurakubashi
Terminus	Kōya Line Local	Imamiyaebisu NK02 towards Gokurakubashi
Location

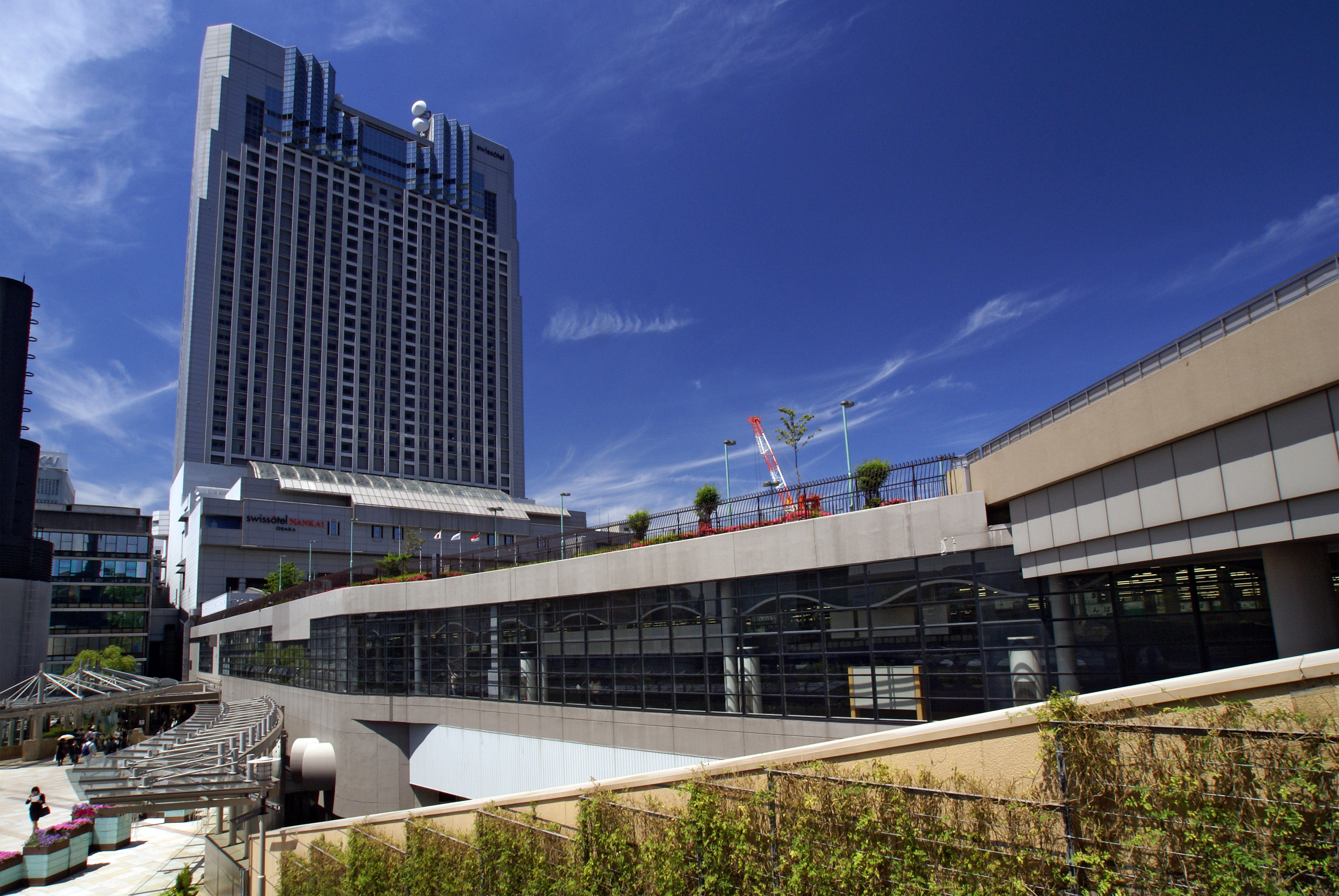
Nankai station from outside

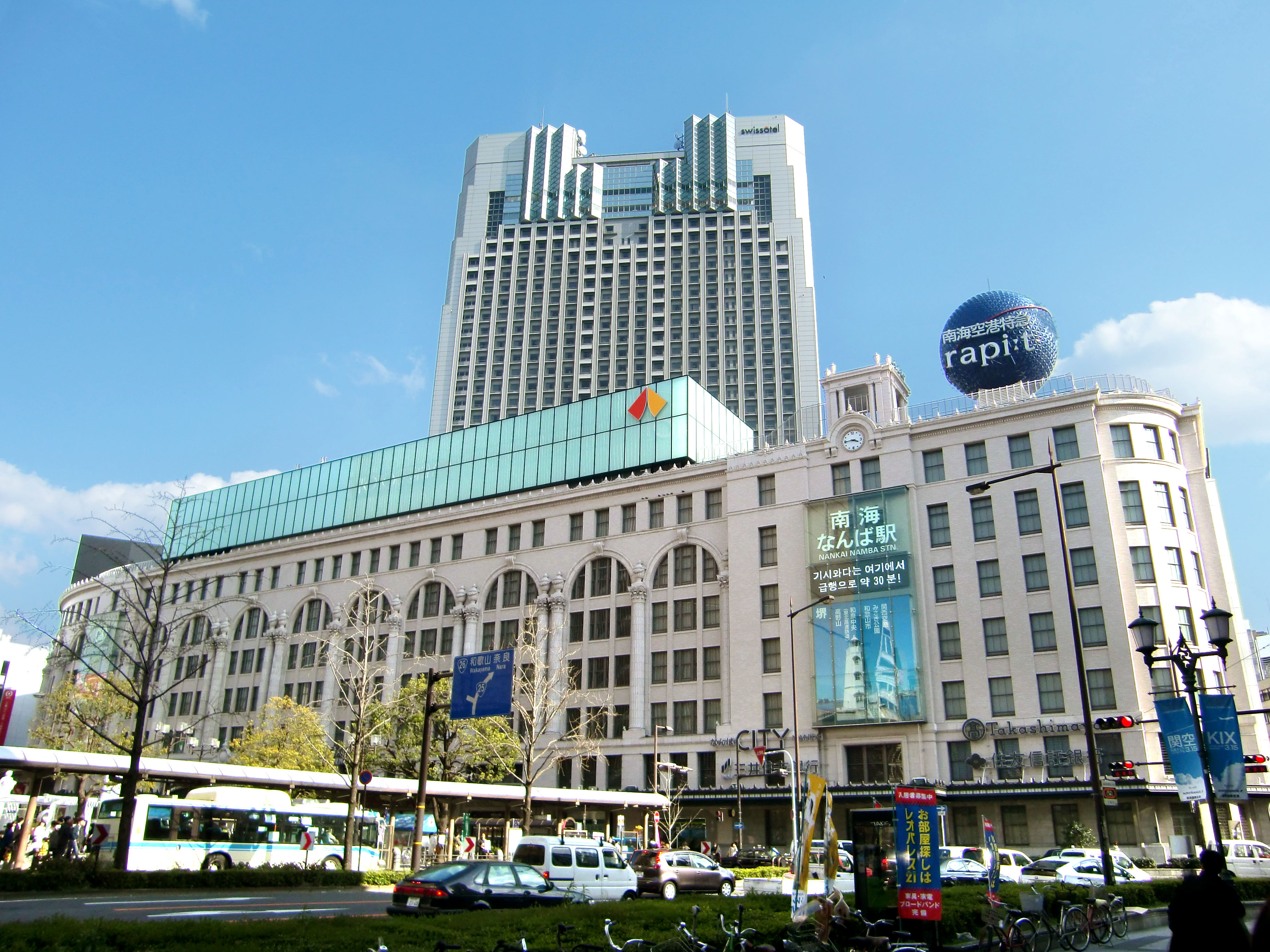
The Nankai Building in front of Namba Station, which also serves as the headquarters of Takashimaya Department Store

=== Layout ===
There are nine bay platforms with eight tracks on the third floor. Nankai Terminal Building is located in front of the station. Ticket gates are located in the north of the platform, in the center on the second floor and in the south on the second floor.

Nankai Koya Line and Semboku Line - for Gokurakubashi (change for Koyasan) and Izumi-Chuo

1	■ Nankai Koya Line	mainly Local trains
2	■ Nankai Koya Line	mainly Semi-Express to Semboku Line some Express, Rapid Express and Sub. Express in the peaks
3	■ Nankai Koya Line	mainly Limited Express, Express, Sub. Express and Rapid Express
4	■ Nankai Koya Line	mainly Limited Express, Express, Sub. Express and Rapid Express

Nankai Line and Airport Line - for Wakayamashi and Kansai Airport

5	■ Nankai Line and Airport Line	mainly Limited Express, Express, Sub. Express and Airport Express
6	■ Nankai Line and Airport Line	mainly Limited Express, Express, Sub. Express and Airport Express
7	■ Nankai Line and Airport Line	mainly Local trains
8	■ Nankai Line and Airport Line	occasionally used for Local trains
9	■ Airport Line	Airport Limited Express Rapi:t

== Osaka Metro ==
Namba Station なんば駅
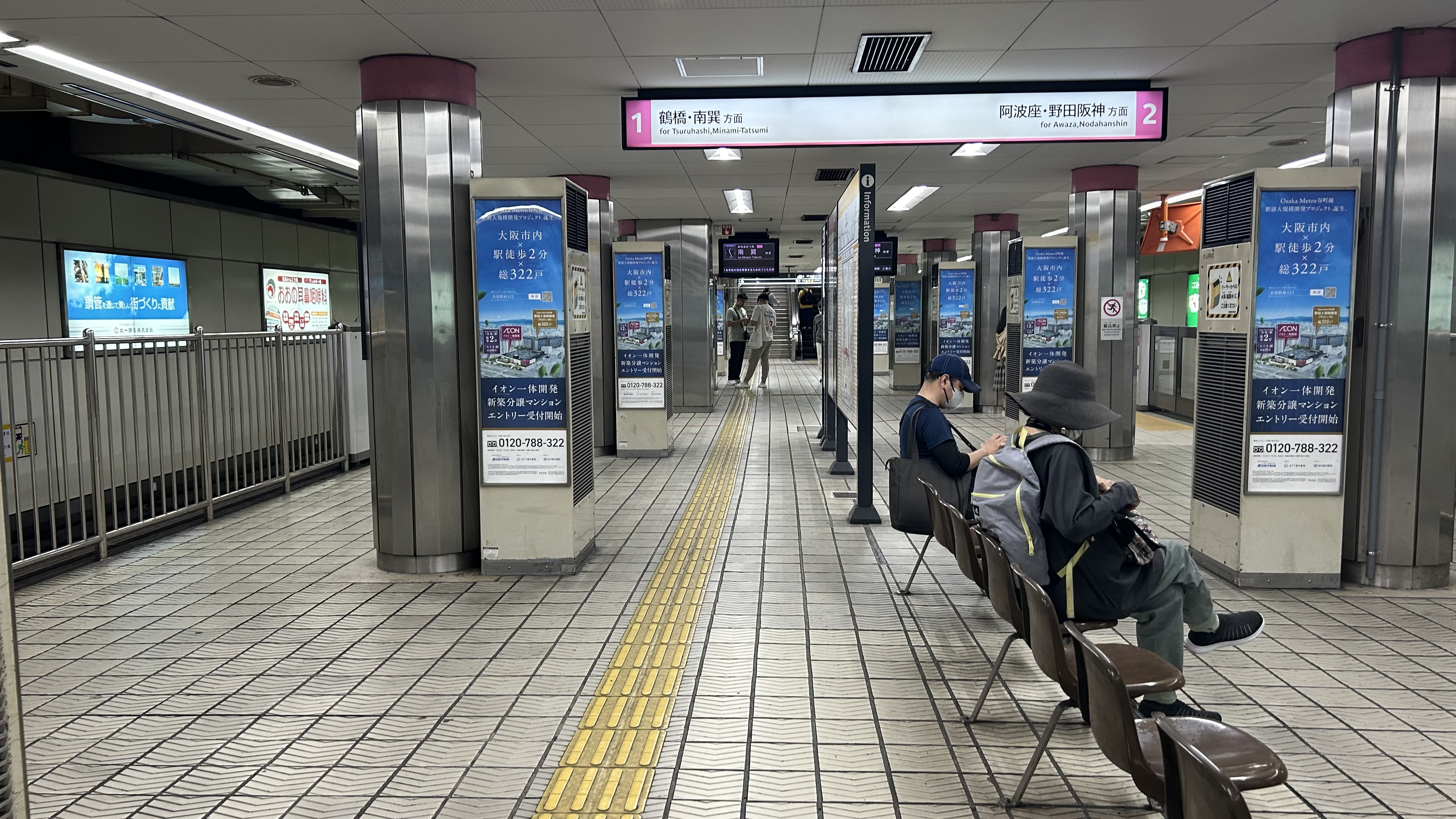
- Sennichimae Line platforms

General information
- Other names: Nankai Namba Station
- Location: Namba Nichōme, Chūō-ku; Namba Sanchōme, Chūō-ku; Motomachi Itchōme, Naniwa-ku; Osaka, Osaka （大阪市中央区難波二丁目・難波三丁目 大阪市浪速区元町一丁目） Japan
- Coordinates: 34°39′58.74″N 135°30′1.13″E (Midosuji Line); 34°40′1.69″N 135°30′1.03″E (Sennichimae Line); 34°39′55.4″N 135°29′52.53″E (Yotsubashi Line)
- System: Osaka Metro
- Operator: Osaka Metro
- Lines: Midōsuji Line; Yotsubashi Line; Sennichimae Line
- Platforms: Midōsuji Line: 2 side platforms Yotsubashi Line: 2 (1 island platform); Sennichimae Line: 2 (1 island platform)
- Tracks: 6 (2 for each line)

Construction
- Structure type: Underground

Other information
- Station code: M 20 Y 15 S 16

History
- Opened: 30 October 1935; 90 years ago

Passengers
- FY2016: 343,016 daily

Services
Preceding station	Osaka Metro	Following station
Shinsaibashi M 19 towards Esaka	Midōsuji Line	Daikokuchō M 21 towards Nakamozu
Yotsubashi Y 14 towards Nishi-Umeda	Yotsubashi Line	Daikokuchō Y 16 towards Suminoekōen
Sakuragawa S 15 towards Nodahanshin	Sennichimae Line	Nippombashi S 17 towards Minami-Tatsumi
Track layout
Midōsuji Line (M20)
Sennichimae Line (S16)
Yotsubashi Line (Y15)
Location

=== Layout ===
==== Midōsuji Line ====
- An island platform and a side platform with two tracks.

1	■ Midōsuji Line	for Tennoji, Abiko, and Nakamozu
2	■ Midōsuji Line	for Umeda, Shin-Ōsaka, Esaka, and Minoh-kayano

The Midōsuji Line station originally opened as an island platform serving two tracks, but overcrowding prompted construction of a side platform serving northbound trains (that platform opened in 1987). As of 2015, the island platform serves only southbound trains, and the northbound side of the island platform is fenced off.

==== Sennichimae Line ====
- An island platform with two tracks

3	■ Sennichimae Line	for Tsuruhashi and Minami-Tatsumi
5	■ Sennichimae Line	for Nodahanshin

==== Yotsubashi Line ====
- An island platform with two tracks

1	■ Yotsubashi Line	for Daikokucho and Suminoekoen
2	■ Yotsubashi Line	for Nishi-Umeda

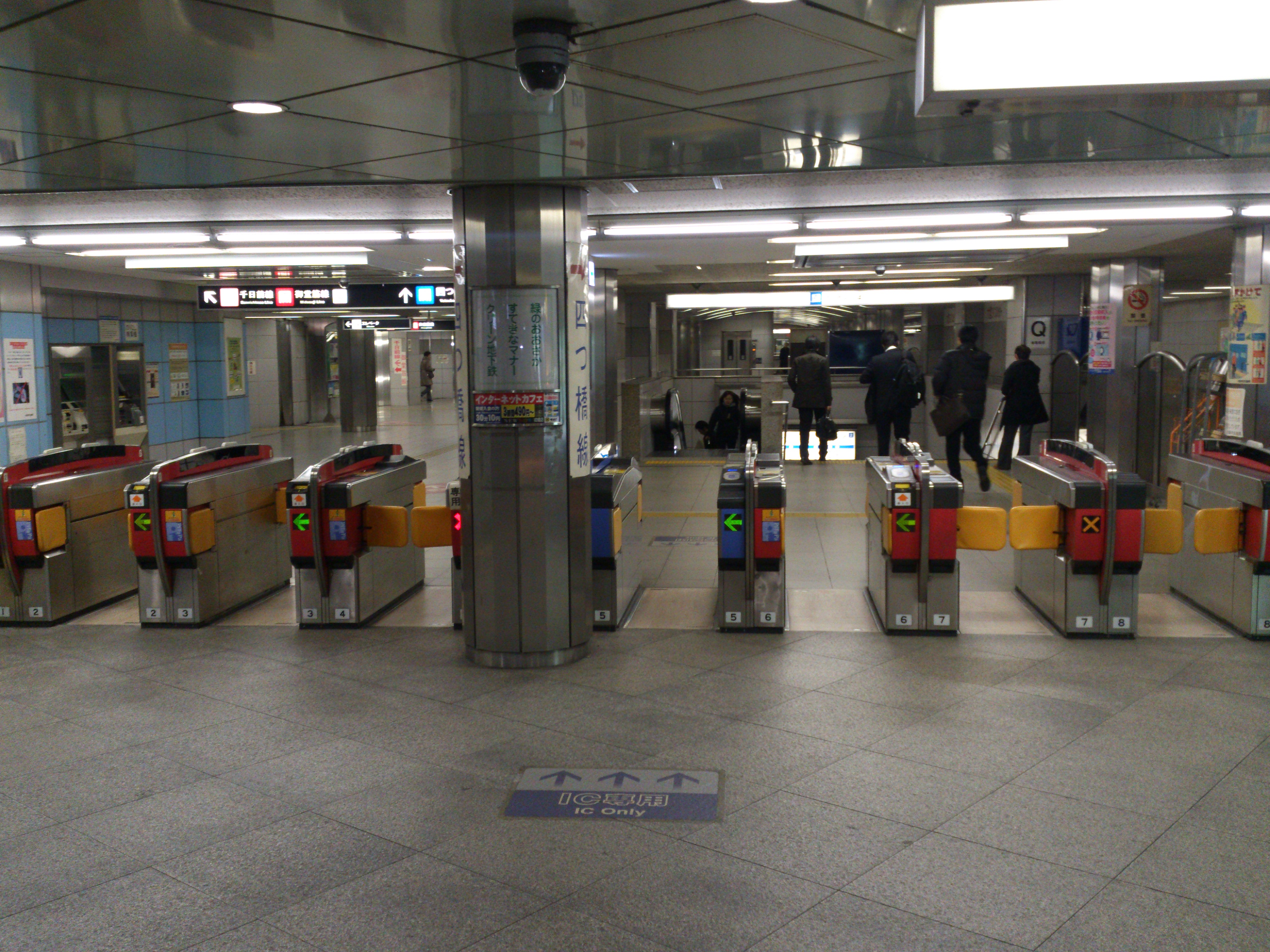
Ticket gates

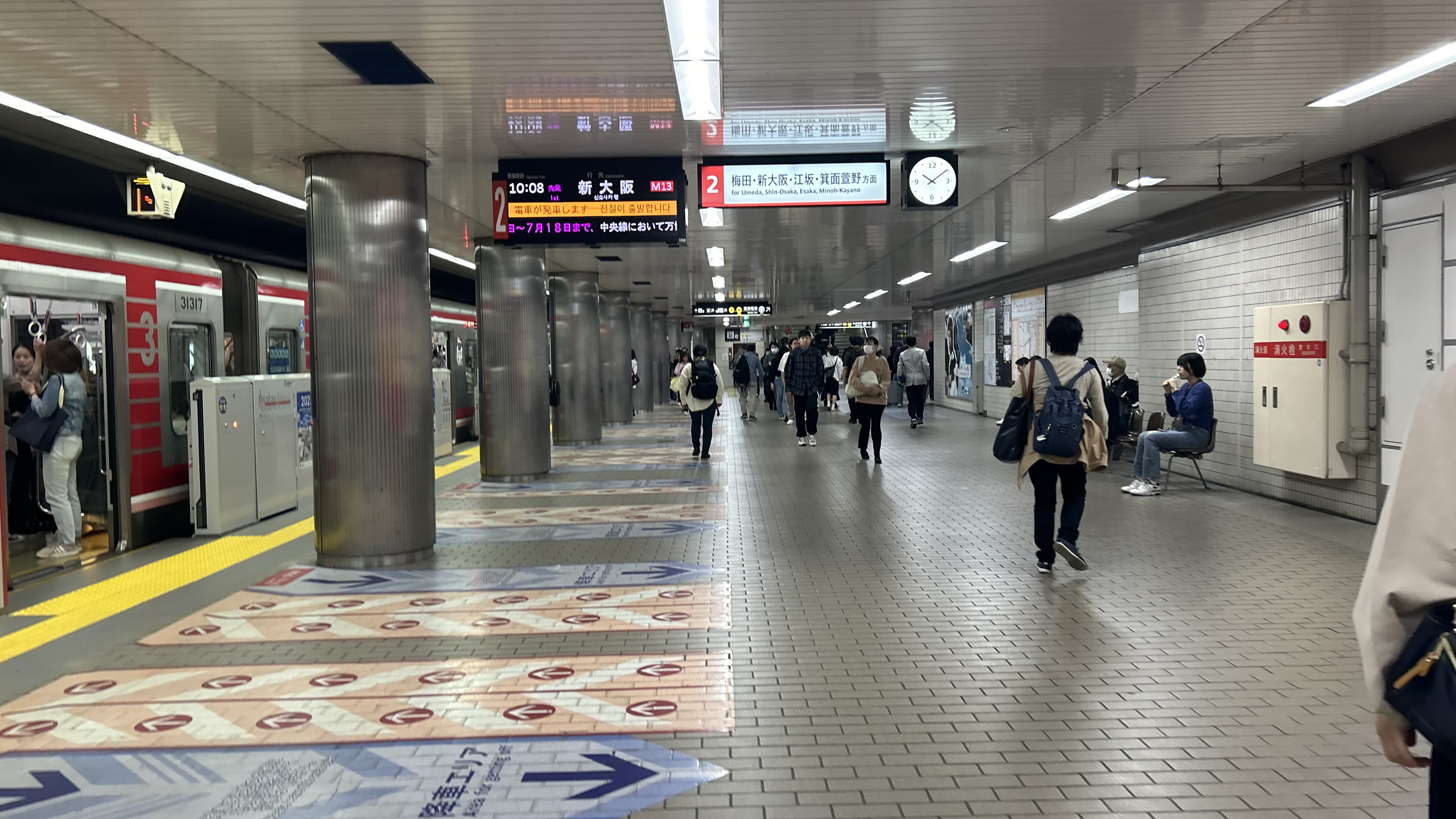
Midōsuji Line platforms

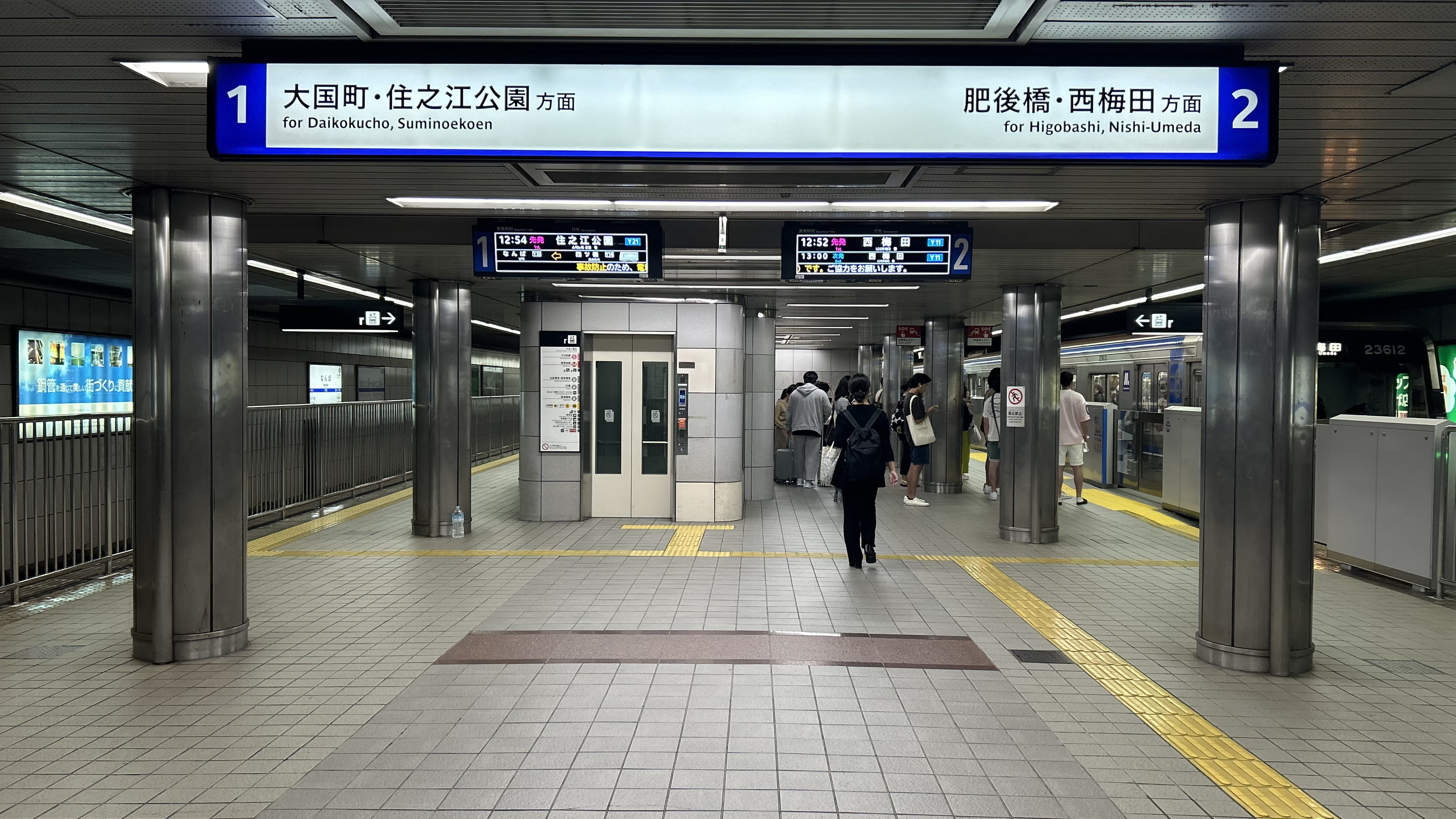
Yotsubashi Line platforms

=== Toilet ===
Toilets are located inside the South-South (North-South), Northeast (Northwest), West, North and South ticket gates.

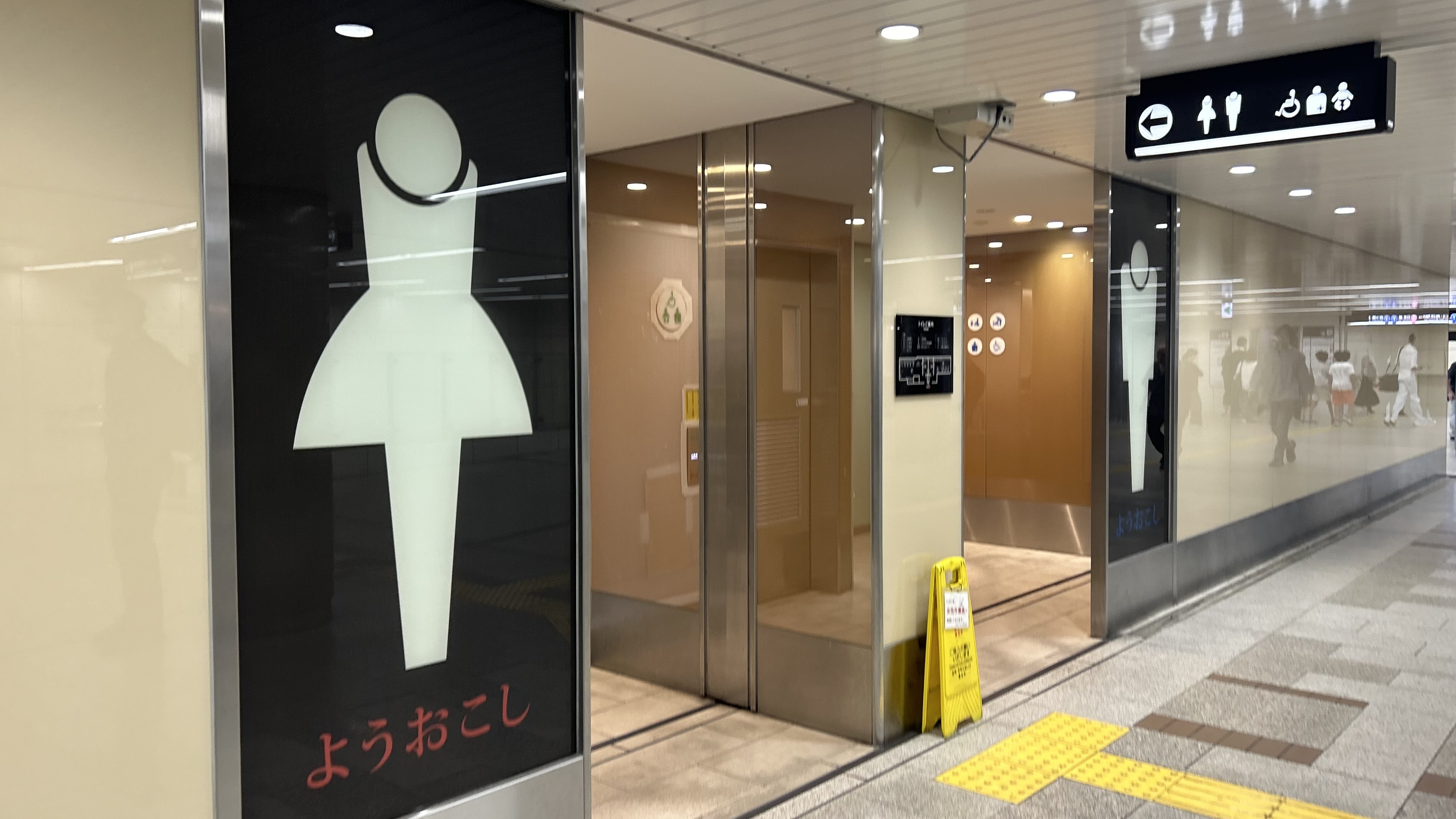
South-South (North-South) ticket gate Toilet

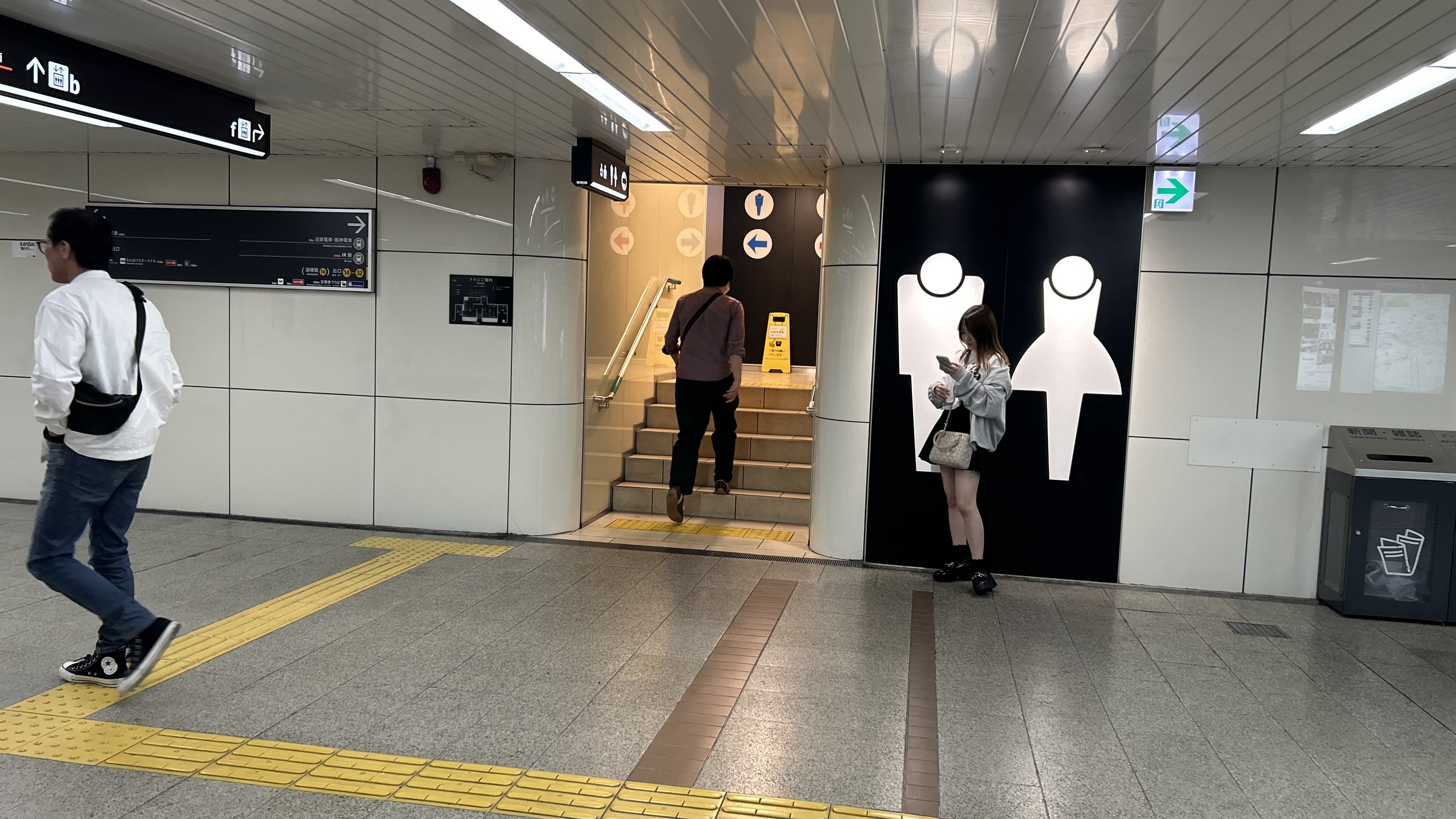
Northeast (Northwest) ticket gate Toilet

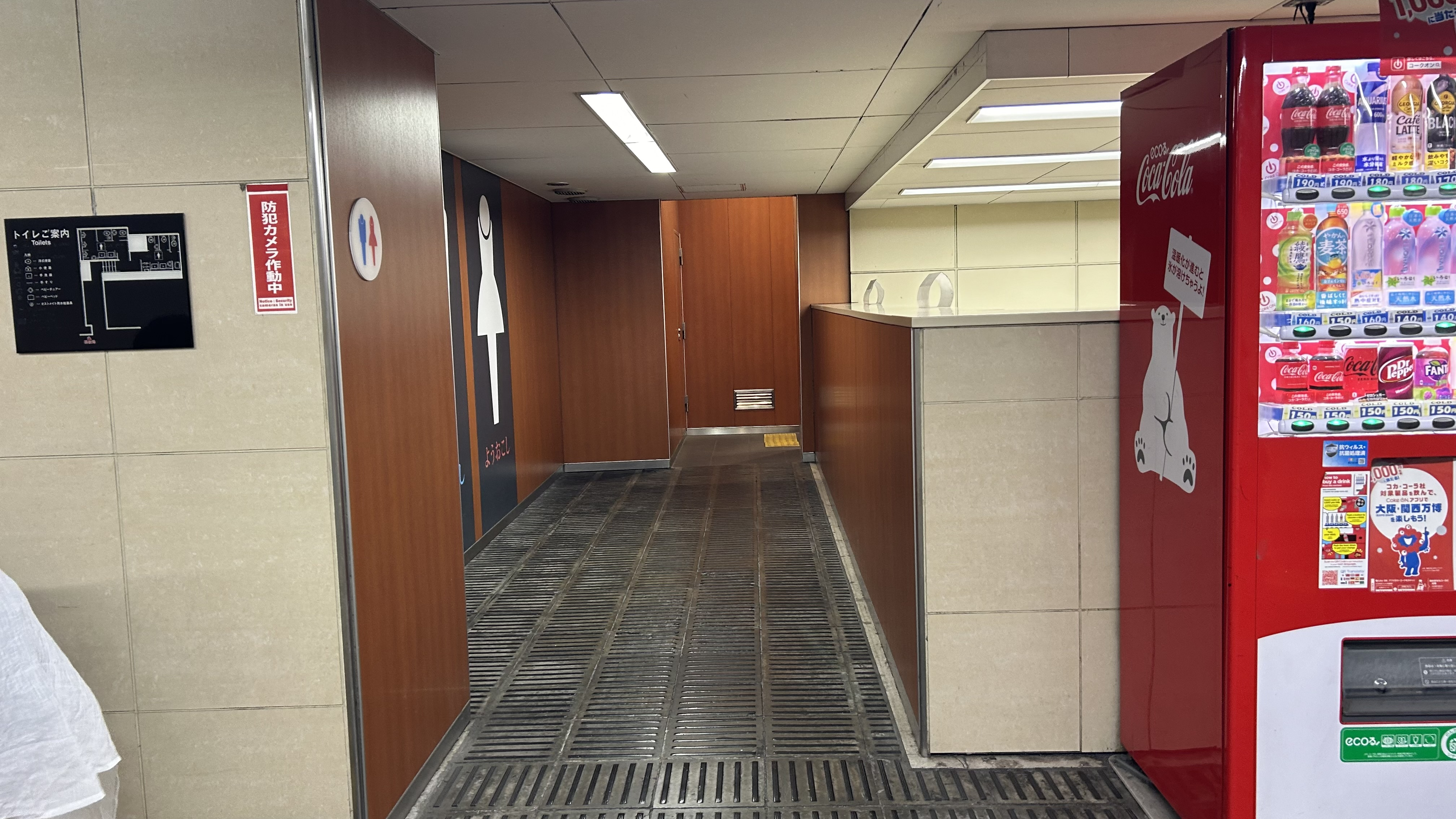
West ticket gate Toilet

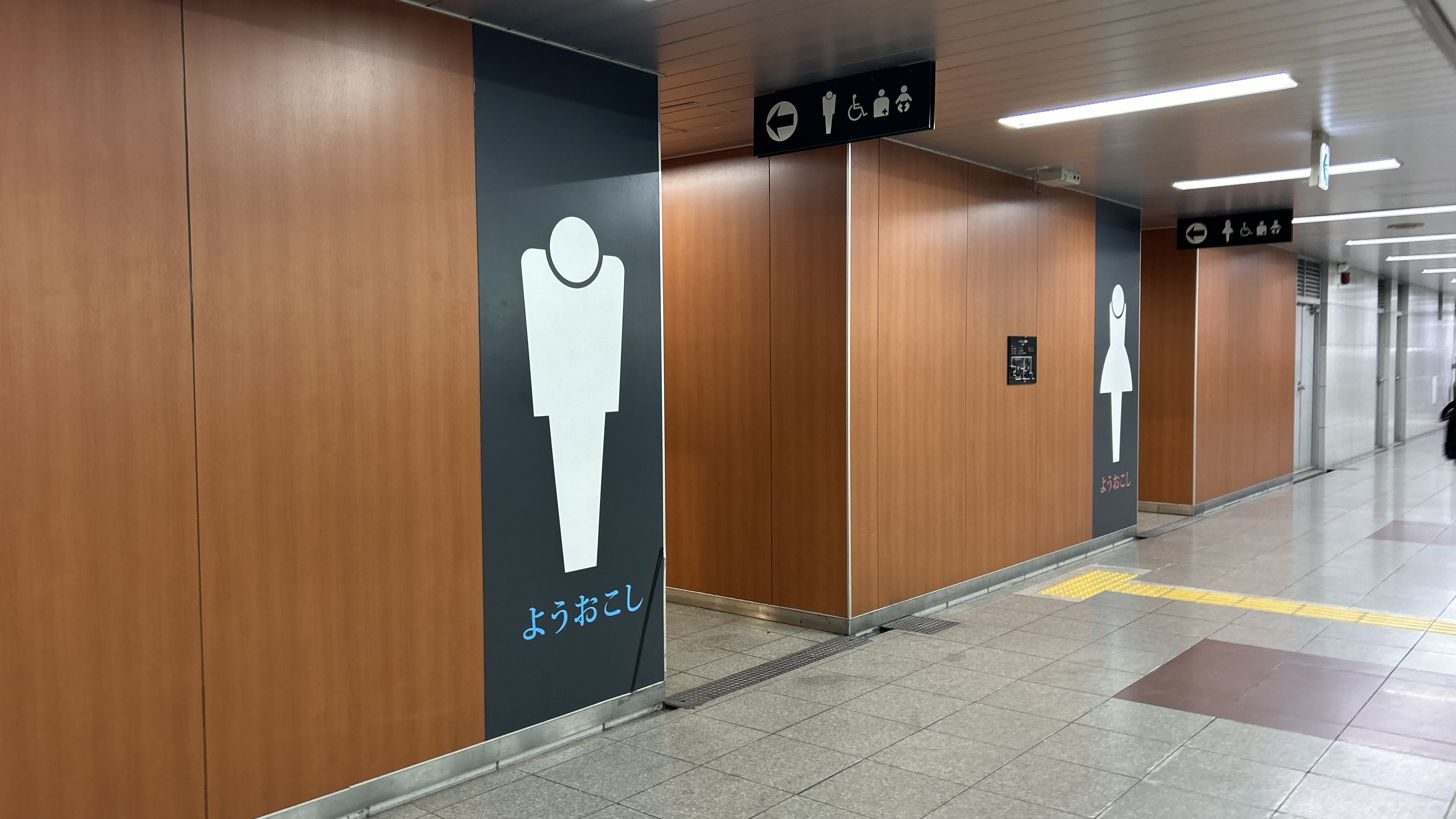
North ticket gate Toilet

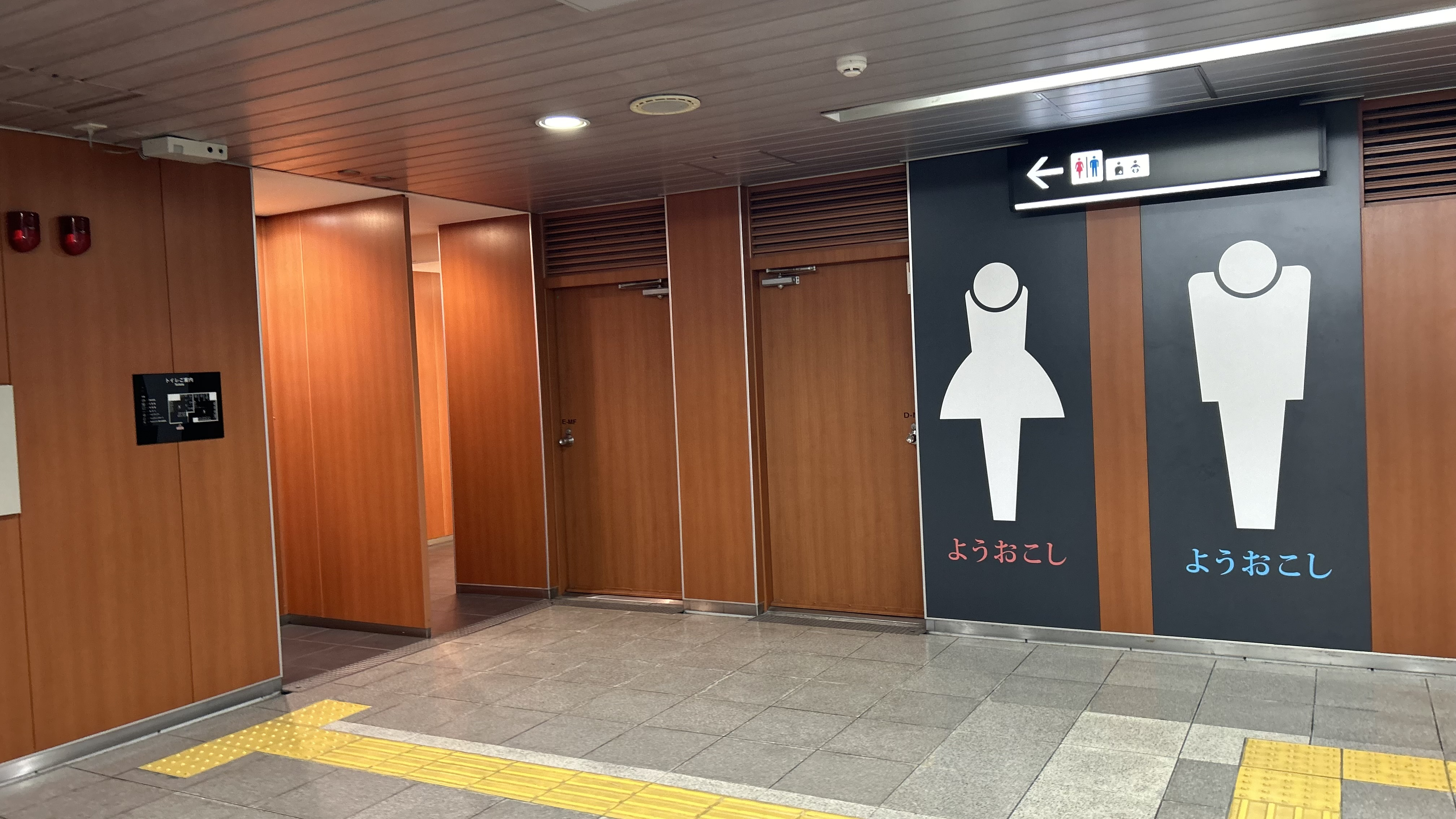
South ticket gate Toilet

== History ==
The Nankai Electric Railway station opened on 29 December 1885. The Osaka Subway Midosuji Line station opened on 30 October 1935, the Yotsubashi Line station opened on 1 October 1965, and the Sennichimae Line opened on 11 March 1970.

=== Future plans ===
Namba Station is to be extended with underground platforms by 2031 with the opening of the Naniwasuji Line, which will branch off the Nankai Main Line to the south of Namba Station and run north in a tunnel until Ōsaka Station.

== Surrounding area ==
- Takashimaya
- Namba City
- Namba Walk
- Namba Marui
- Namba Parks
- Swissôtel Nankai Osaka
- Namba SkyO
- Namba Expressway Bus Terminal
- Osaka City Air Terminal (OCAT)
- Parks Tower (Namba Parks)
- Bic Camera
- Namba NanNan
- Minatomachi River Place (including FM OSAKA)
- Namba Grand Kagetsu
- Nankai Electric Railway headquarters
- Osaka Prefectural Gymnasium
- Ebisubashi Shopping Arcade
- Doguyasuji Shopping Arcade
- NMB48
- Namba Yasaka Shrine
- Hōzen-ji

== See also ==
- List of railway stations in Japan
