= Awaza Station =

Metro station in Osaka, Japan

Awaza Station 阿波座駅
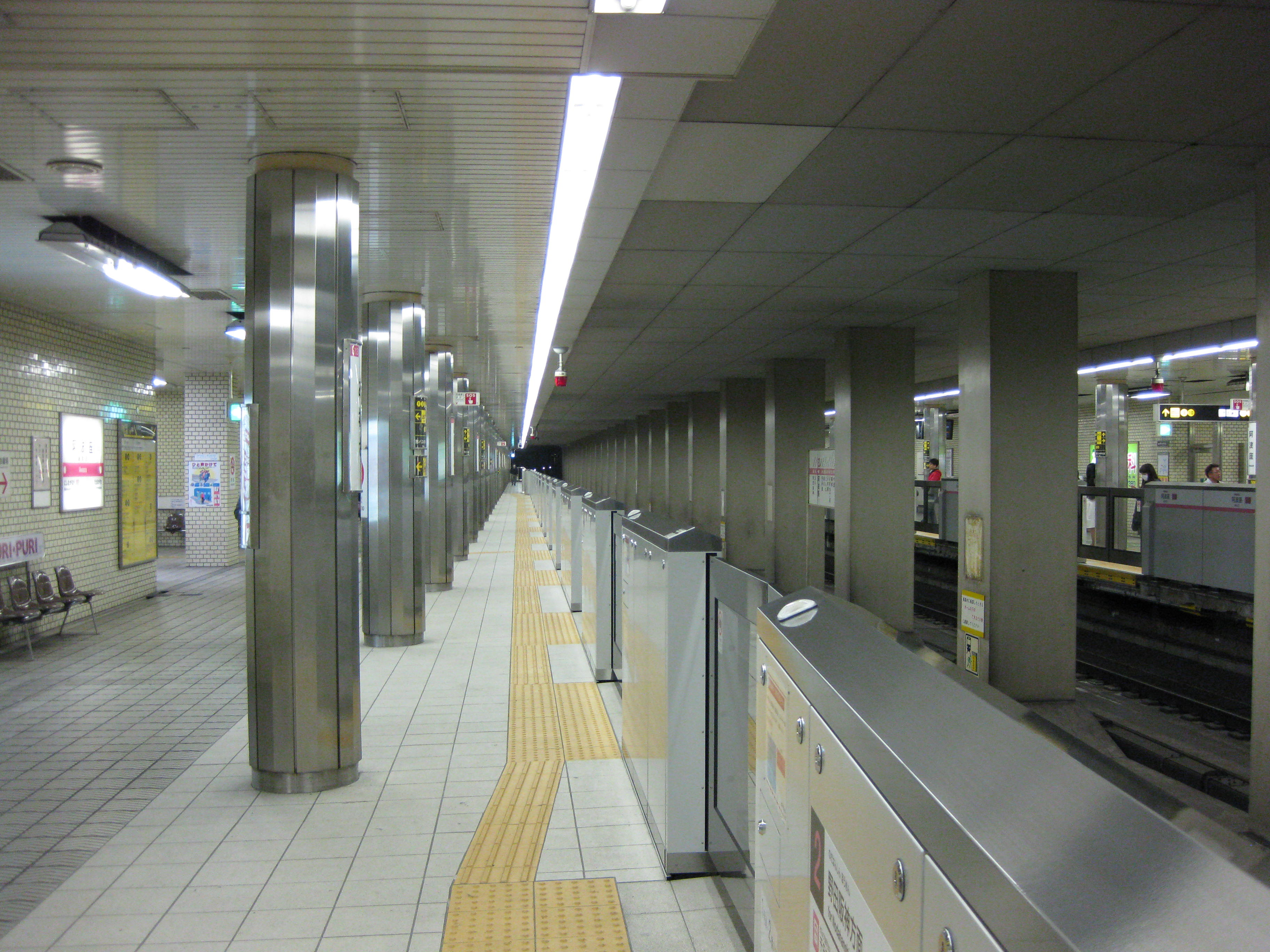
- Sennnichimae Line platform

General information
- Location: 1-23, Nishihommachi 3-chome, Nishi, Osaka, Osaka （大阪市西区西本町三丁目1-23） Japan
- Coordinates: 34°40′53″N 135°29′11″E
- System: Osaka Metro
- Operator: Osaka Metro
- Lines: Chūō Line; Sennichimae Line
- Platforms: 2 side platforms (Chūō Line); 2 side platforms (Sennichimae Line)
- Tracks: 4 (2 for each line)
- Connections: Bus stop

Construction
- Platform levels: 2

Other information
- Station code: C 15 S 13

History
- Opened: 1964

Passengers
- FY2016: 46,019 daily

Services
Preceding station	Osaka Metro	Following station
Kujō C 14 towards Yumeshima	Chūō Line	Hommachi C 16 towards Nagata
Tamagawa S 12 towards Nodahanshin	Sennichimae Line	Nishi-Nagahori S 14 towards Minami-Tatsumi
Location
- Location within Osaka Prefecture Location within Japan

Awaza Station (阿波座駅, Awaza-eki) is a railway station on the two lines of the Osaka Metro. The station is in Nishi-ku, Osaka, Japan.

== Lines ==
- Osaka Metro
  - Chūō Line (Station Number: C15)
  - Sennichimae Line (Station Number: S13)

== Layout ==
- There are two side platforms with two tracks for the Chuo Line on the first basement and two side platforms with two tracks for the Sennichimae Line on the second basement. Passages are located between the west of platforms for the Chuo Line and the south of platforms for the Sennichimae Line.

Chuo Line

1	■ Chūō Line	for Hommachi, Tanimachi Yonchome, Morinomiya, Nagata, Ikoma and Gakken Nara-Tomigaoka

2	■ Chūō Line	for Bentencho, Osakako and Yumeshima

Sennichimae Line

1	■ Sennichimae Line	for Namba, Tsuruhashi and Minami-Tatsumi

2	■ Sennichimae Line	for Nodahanshin
