= Minami-Tatsumi Station =

Metro station in Osaka, Japan

Coordinates: 34°38′36″N 135°33′12″E

Minami-Tatsumi Station 南巽駅
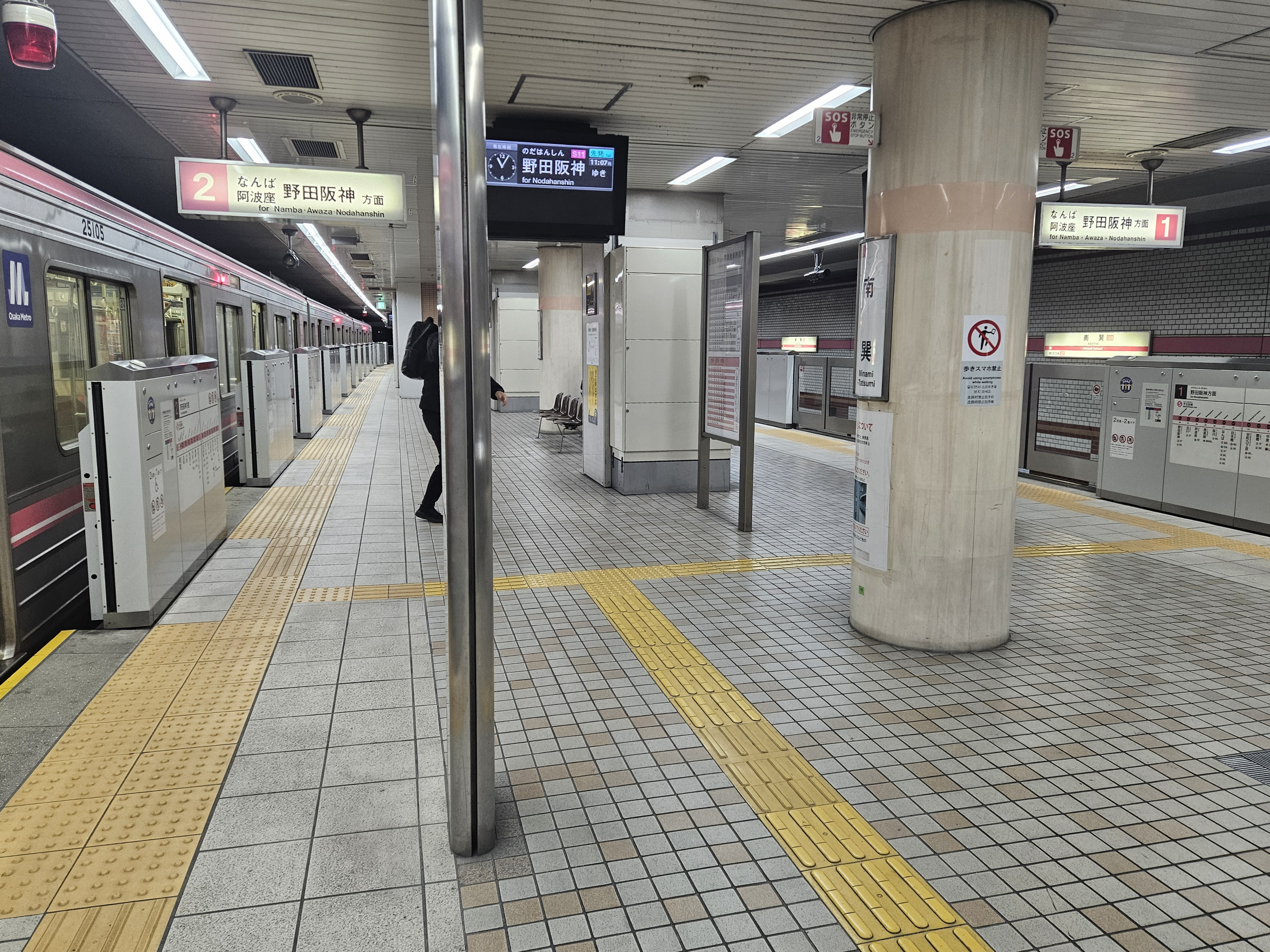
- Station platform

General information
- System: Osaka Metro
- Operator: Osaka Metro
- Line: Sennichimae Line
- Platforms: 1 island platforms
- Tracks: 2

Construction
- Structure type: Underground

Other information
- Station code: S 24

History
- Opened: 2 December 1981; 44 years ago

Services
Preceding station	Osaka Metro	Following station
Kita-Tatsumi S 23 towards Nodahanshin	Sennichimae Line	Terminus
Location
- Location within Osaka Prefecture Location within Japan

Minami-Tatsumi Station (南巽駅, Minami-Tatsumi-eki; (Station Number S24)) is a railway station in Ikuno-ku, Osaka, Japan, operated by the Osaka Metro. It is an underground station with two tracks.

== Lines ==
Minami-Tatsumi Station is the terminus of the Sennichimae Line from Nodahanshin. Trains operate from morning 5 AM. First train is at 5.03 AM and the last train is at 23.46 PM.

== Station layout ==
The station is located beneath National Route 479. It consists of an island platform serving two tracks on the second basement level.

=== Platforms ===
1/2	■ Sennichimae Line	for Tsuruhashi, Namba, Awaza, and Nodahanshin
