= Nodahanshin Station =

Metro station in Osaka, Japan

Nodahanshin Station 野田阪神駅
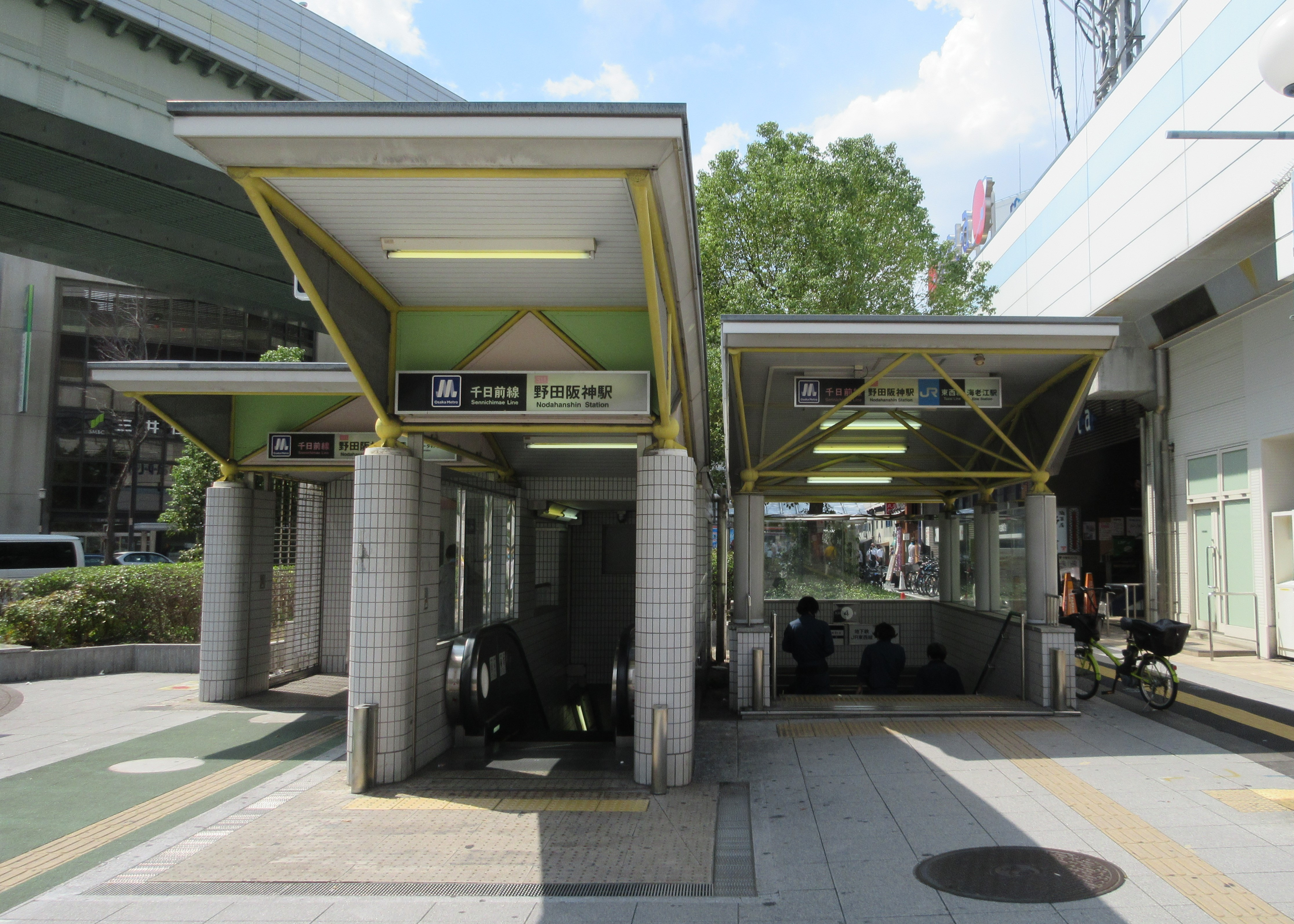
- Entrance to the station

General information
- Location: 14-18, Ōhiraki 1-chome, Fukushima, Osaka, Osaka （大阪市福島区大開一丁目14-18） Japan
- Coordinates: 34°41′41″N 135°28′29″E
- System: Osaka Metro
- Operator: Osaka Metro
- Line: Sennichimae Line
- Platforms: 2 side platforms (1 for arrivals, 1 for departures)
- Tracks: 2
- Connections: Bus stop; Hanshin Electric Railway Main Line at Noda; JR West Tozai Line at Ebie

Construction
- Structure type: Underground
- Accessible: Access available to Platform 1 only by an elevator; Platform 2 not accessible for passengers with disabilities

Other information
- Station code: S 11

History
- Opened: 16 April 1969; 57 years ago

Services
Preceding station	Osaka Metro	Following station
Terminus	Sennichimae Line	Tamagawa S 12 towards Minami-Tatsumi
Location
- Location within Osaka Prefecture Location within Japan

Nodahanshin Station (野田阪神駅, Nodahanshin-eki; station number: S11) is a terminus on the Osaka Metro Sennichimae Line in Fukushima-ku, Osaka, Japan.

The station name "Nodahanshin" was originally a name of tram stop of a former municipal streetcar line and means "Hanshin Railway Noda Station".

== Layout ==
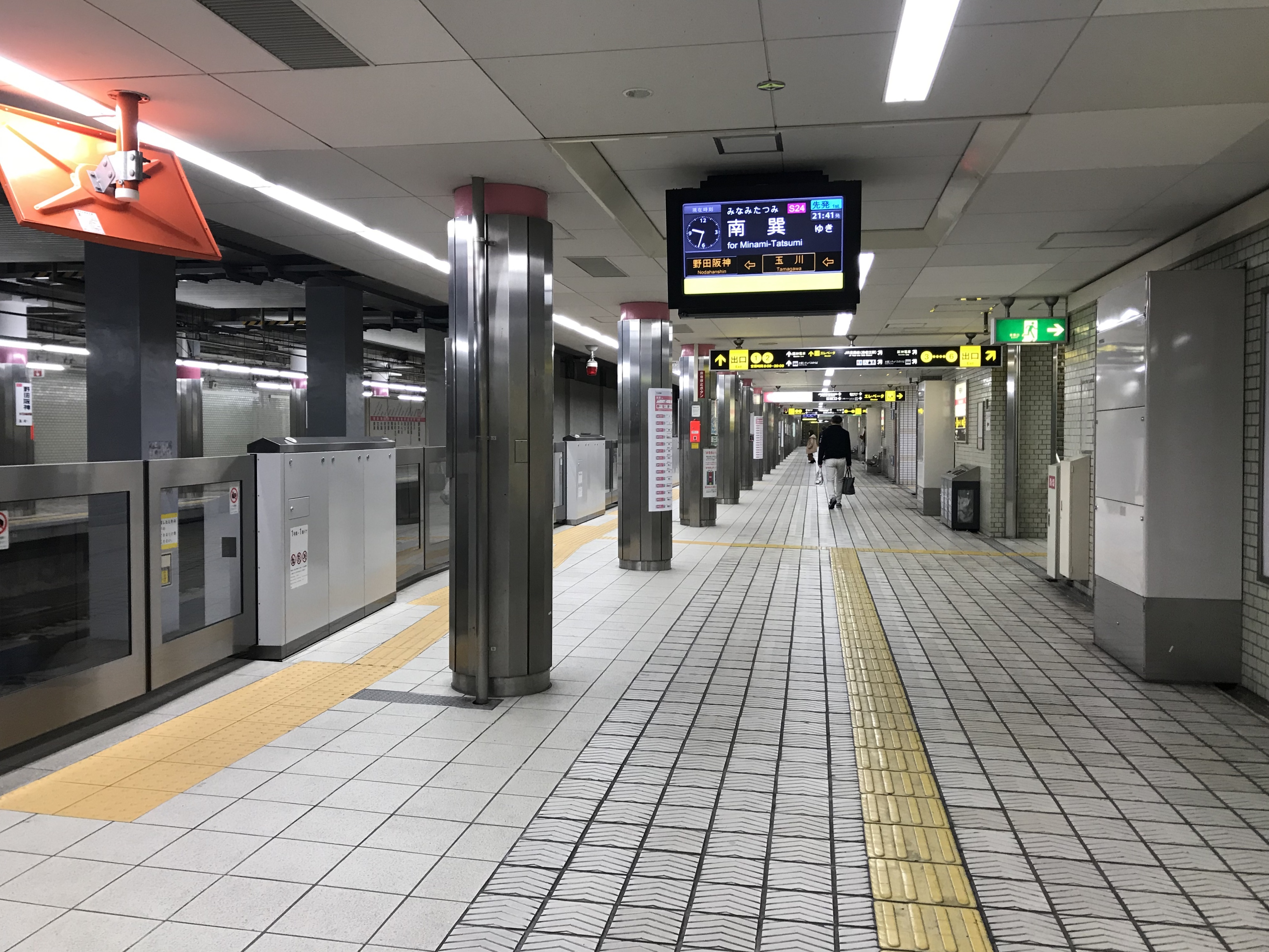
Station platforms
- This station is located under the ground level. It has 2 side platforms serving a track each on the third basement.
- Ticket gates are located in the center east and the center west: the former connects to Platform 1 for entrance and exit by stairs and an elevator, and the latter connect from Platform 2 for exit by stairs only. The north gate and the south gate were closed and the center west gate became in use on March 27, 2020.

1	■ Sennichimae Line	for Namba, Tsuruhashi and Minami-Tatsumi
2	■ Arrival platform	Terminating services only (Trains are headed to Morinomiya Depot after arriving at this station.)

Since platform 2 is used for arriving services only, automatic platform gates are not used on that platform.

== Surroundings ==
- the headquarters of Hanshin Electric Railway Co., Ltd.
- WISTE
- Fukushima Ward Office
- Osaka Prefectural Fukushima Police Station
- Osaka Municipal Fukushima Library
- Japan National Route 2
