= Kishinosato Station =

Metro station in Osaka, Japan

Coordinates: 34.634364°N 135.493848°E

Kishinosato Station 岸里駅
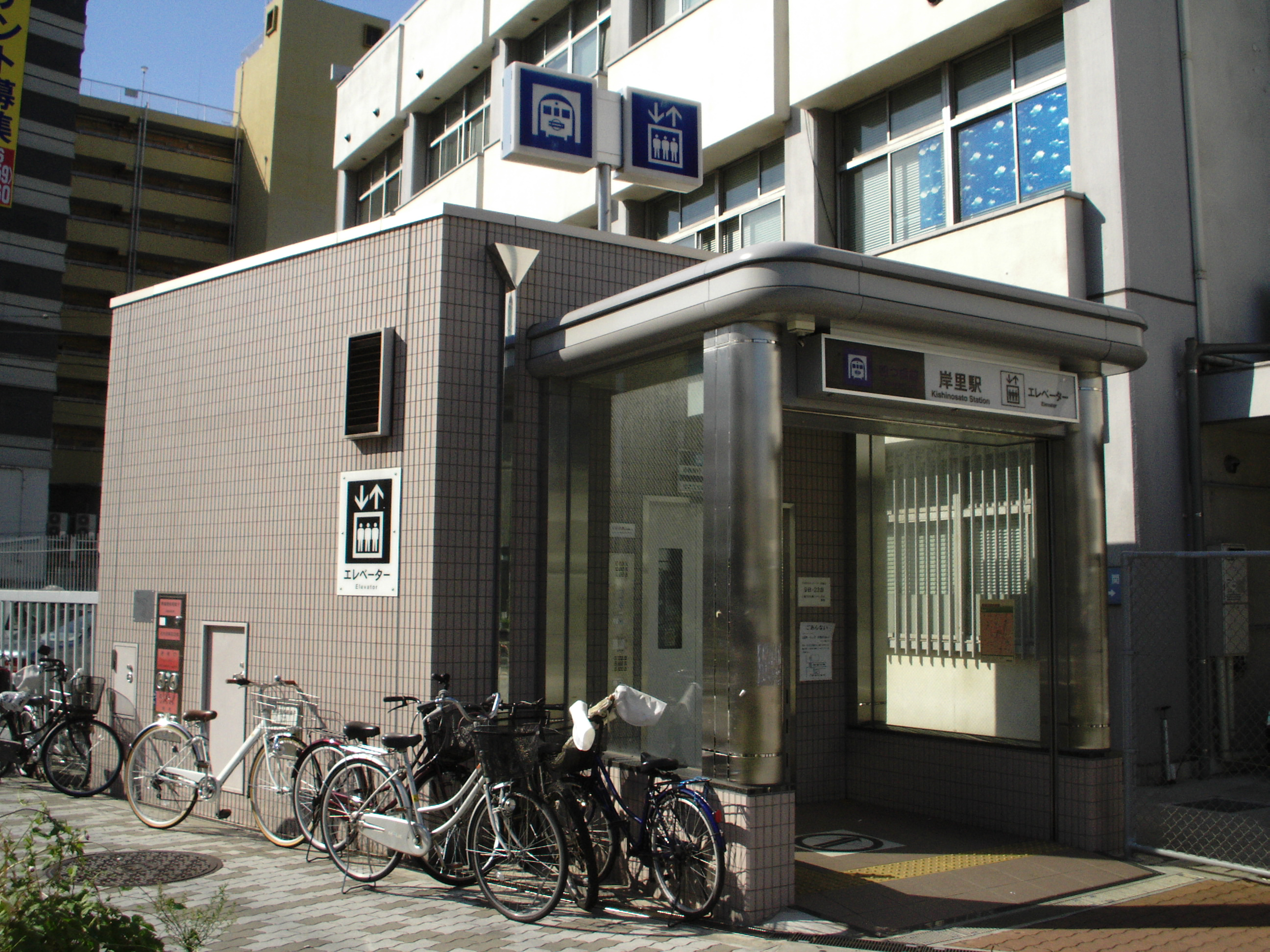
- Station entrance

General information
- Location: Nishinari-ku, Osaka; Japan
- System: Osaka Metro
- Operated by: Osaka Metro
- Line: Yotsubashi Line
- Platforms: 2 side platforms
- Tracks: 2

Construction
- Structure type: Underground

Other information
- Station code: Y 18

History
- Opened: 1 June 1956; 69 years ago

Services
Preceding station	Osaka Metro	Following station
Hanazonochō Y 17 towards Nishi-Umeda	Yotsubashi Line	Tamade Y 19 towards Suminoekōen

Kishinosato Station (岸里駅, Kishinosato-eki; station number: Y18) is a train station on the Osaka Metro Yotsubashi Line in Nishinari-ku, Osaka, Japan.

While situated relatively close to the Tengachaya station served by the Sakaisuji Line and Nankai Railway, there are no transfer passageways between the two stations.

== Layout ==
There are two side platforms with two tracks on the first basement.

1	■ Yotsubashi Line	for Suminoekoen
2	■ Yotsubashi Line	for Daikokucho, Namba and Nishi-Umeda
