= Kitakagaya Station =

Metro station in Osaka, Japan

Coordinates: 34.621272°N 135.478849°E

Kitakagaya Station 北加賀屋駅
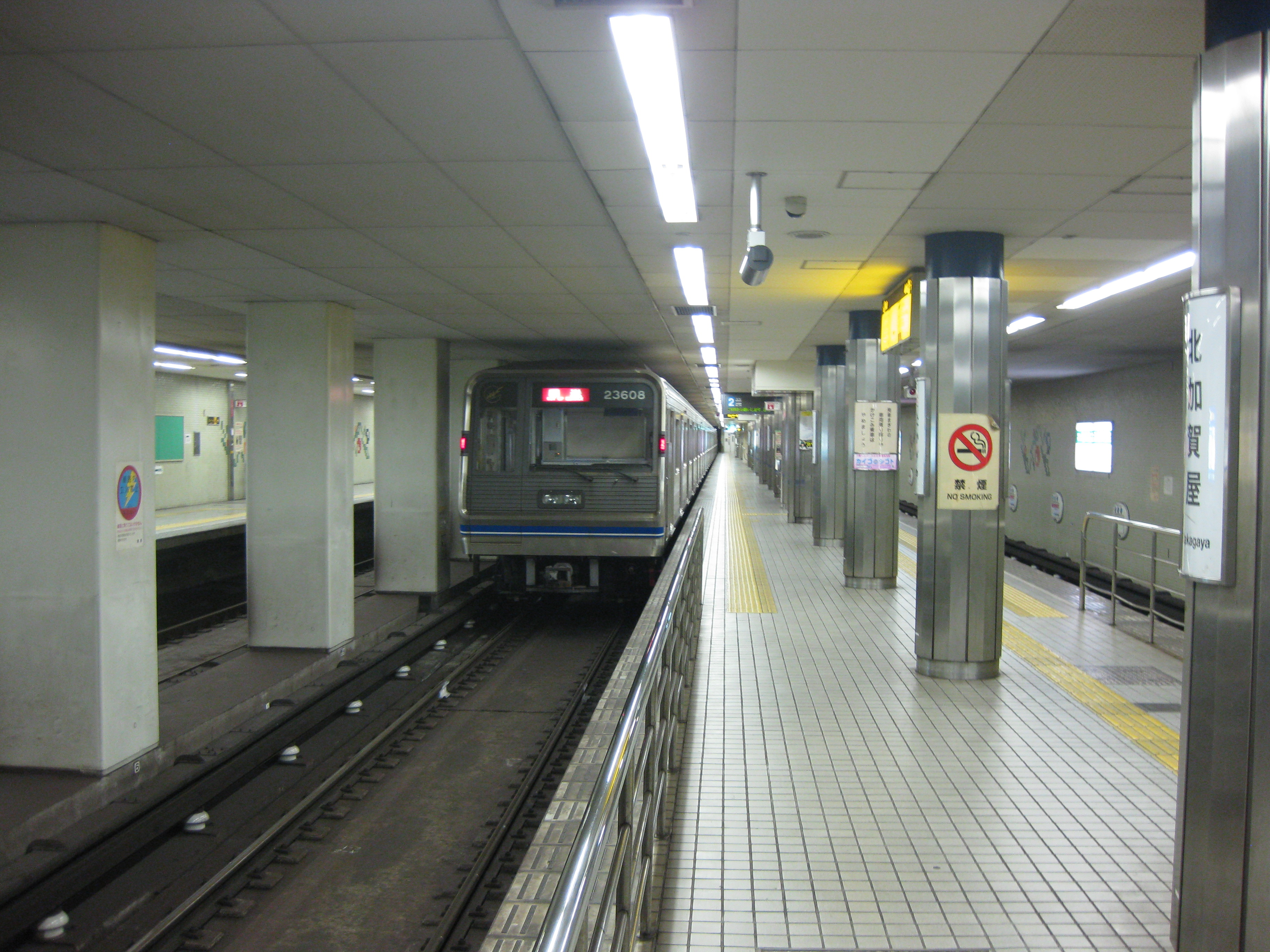
- Station platforms

General information
- Location: Suminoe-ku, Osaka; Japan
- System: Osaka Metro
- Operator: Osaka Metro
- Line: Yotsubashi Line
- Platforms: 1 island platform 1 side platform
- Tracks: 3

Other information
- Station code: Y 20

History
- Opened: 9 November 1972; 53 years ago

Services
Preceding station	Osaka Metro	Following station
Tamade Y 19 towards Nishi-Umeda	Yotsubashi Line	Suminoekōen Y 21 Terminus
Location
- Location within Osaka Prefecture Location within Japan

Kitakagaya Station (北加賀屋駅, Kitakagaya-eki; station number: Y20) is a metro station on the Osaka Metro Yotsubashi Line in Suminoe-ku, Osaka, Japan.

== Layout ==
- There are a side platform and an island platform with 3 tracks on the second basement.

1	■ Yotsubashi Line	to Suminoekōen
2	■ Yotsubashi Line	for Daikokuchō, Namba and Nishi-Umeda (trains starting at Kitakagaya)
3	■ Yotsubashi Line	for Daikokuchō, Namba and Nishi-Umeda (from Suminoekoen)

== Surroundings ==
- Chidori Bunka
- Creative Center Osaka
- Kitakagaya Creative Village
- Morimura@Museum
- The Branch Art Lab
