= Hanazonochō Station =

Metro station in Osaka, Japan

Coordinates: 34.6431°N 135.4959°E

Hanazonocho Station 花園町駅
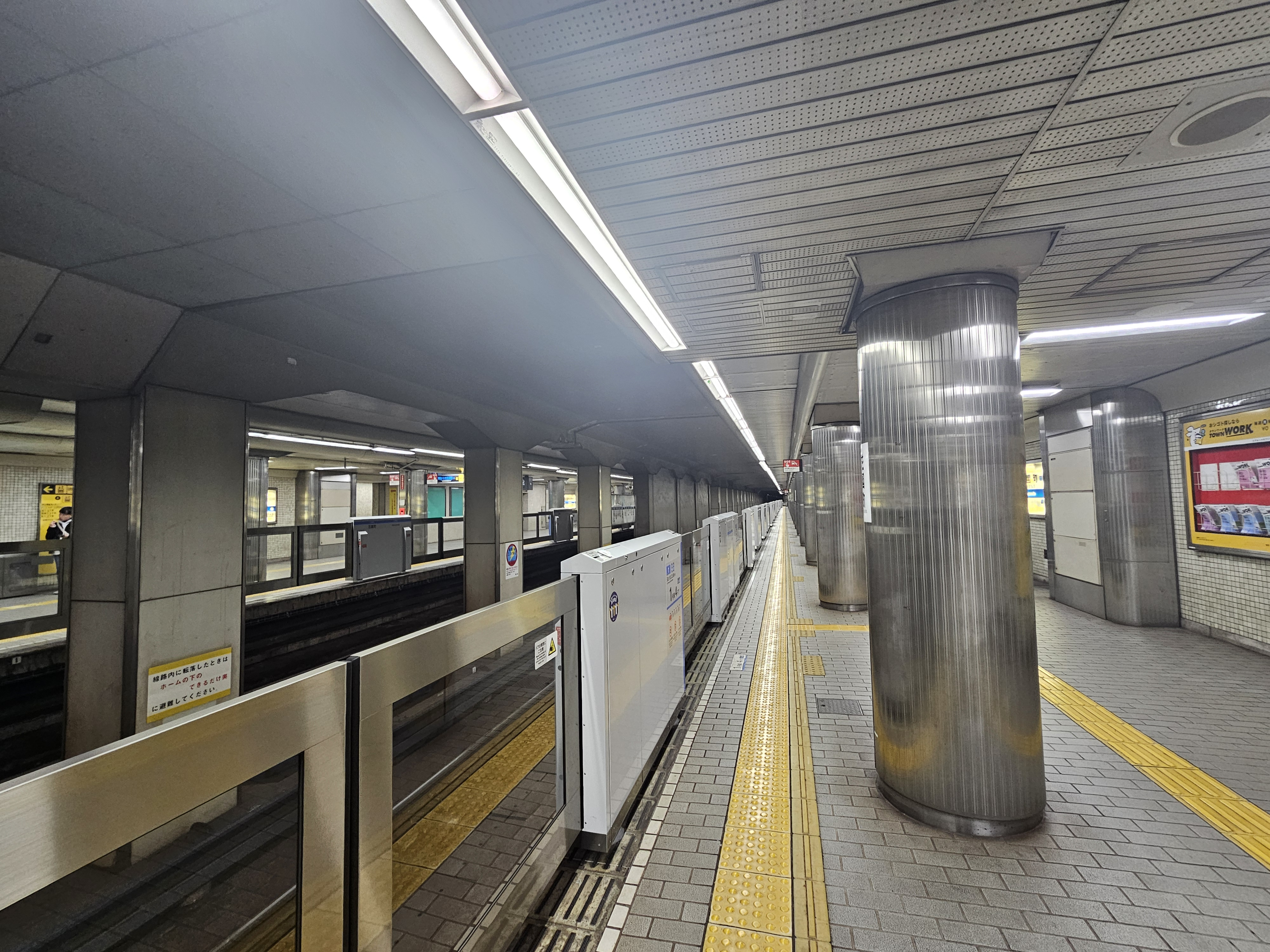
- Station platform

General information
- Location: Nishinari-ku, Osaka; Japan
- System: Osaka Metro
- Operator: Osaka Metro
- Line: Yotsubashi Line
- Platforms: 2 side platforms
- Tracks: 2

Construction
- Structure type: Underground

Other information
- Station code: Y 17
- Website: Official website

History
- Opened: 10 May 1942; 84 years ago

Services
Preceding station	Osaka Metro	Following station
Daikokuchō Y 16 towards Nishi-Umeda	Yotsubashi Line	Kishinosato Y 18 towards Suminoekōen
Location
- Location within Osaka Prefecture Location within Japan

Hanazonocho Station (花園町駅, Hanazonochō-eki; station number: Y17) is a train station on the Osaka Metro Yotsubashi Line in Nishinari-ku, Osaka, Japan].

== Layout ==
There are two side platforms with two tracks on the first basement.

1	■ Yotsubashi Line	for Suminoekōen
2	■ Yotsubashi Line	for Daikokuchō, Namba and Nishi-Umeda

== See also ==
- List of railway stations in Japan
