= Tamade Station (Osaka) =

Metro station in Osaka, Japan

Coordinates: 34.624062°N 135.490544°E

Tamade Station 玉出駅
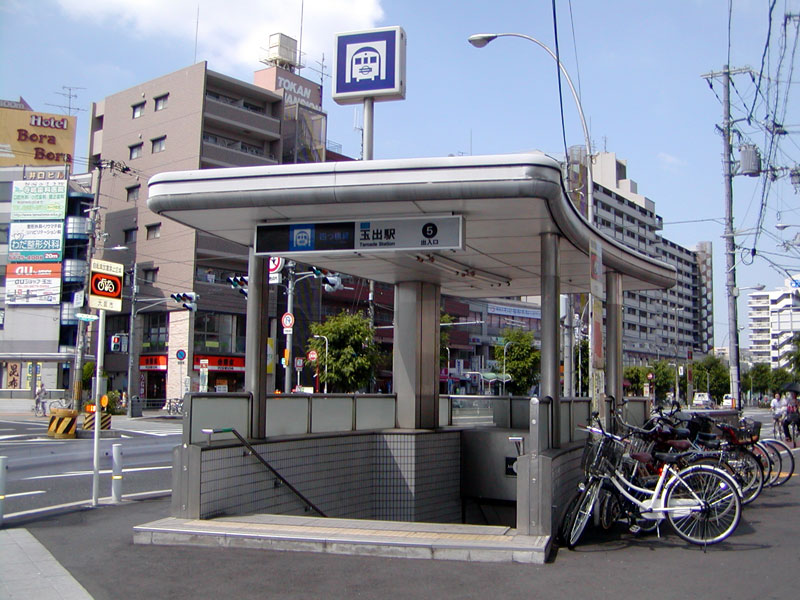
- Exit 5

General information
- Location: Kohamanishi 1-chōme, Suminoe-ku, Osaka 559-0007; Japan
- System: Osaka Metro
- Operator: Osaka Metro
- Line: Yotsubashi Line
- Platforms: 1 island platform
- Tracks: 2

Construction
- Structure type: Underground

Other information
- Station code: Y 19

History
- Opened: 31 May 1956; 70 years ago

Services
Preceding station	Osaka Metro	Following station
Kishinosato Y 18 towards Nishi-Umeda	Yotsubashi Line	Kitakagaya Y 20 towards Suminoekōen
Location
- Location within Osaka Prefecture Location within Japan

Tamade Station (玉出駅, Tamade-eki; station number: Y19) is a train station on the Osaka Metro Yotsubashi Line in Suminoe-ku, Osaka, Japan.

== Layout ==
There is an island platform with two tracks on the second basement.

1	■ Yotsubashi Line	for Suminoekoen
2	■ Yotsubashi Line	for Daikokucho, Namba and Nishi-Umeda

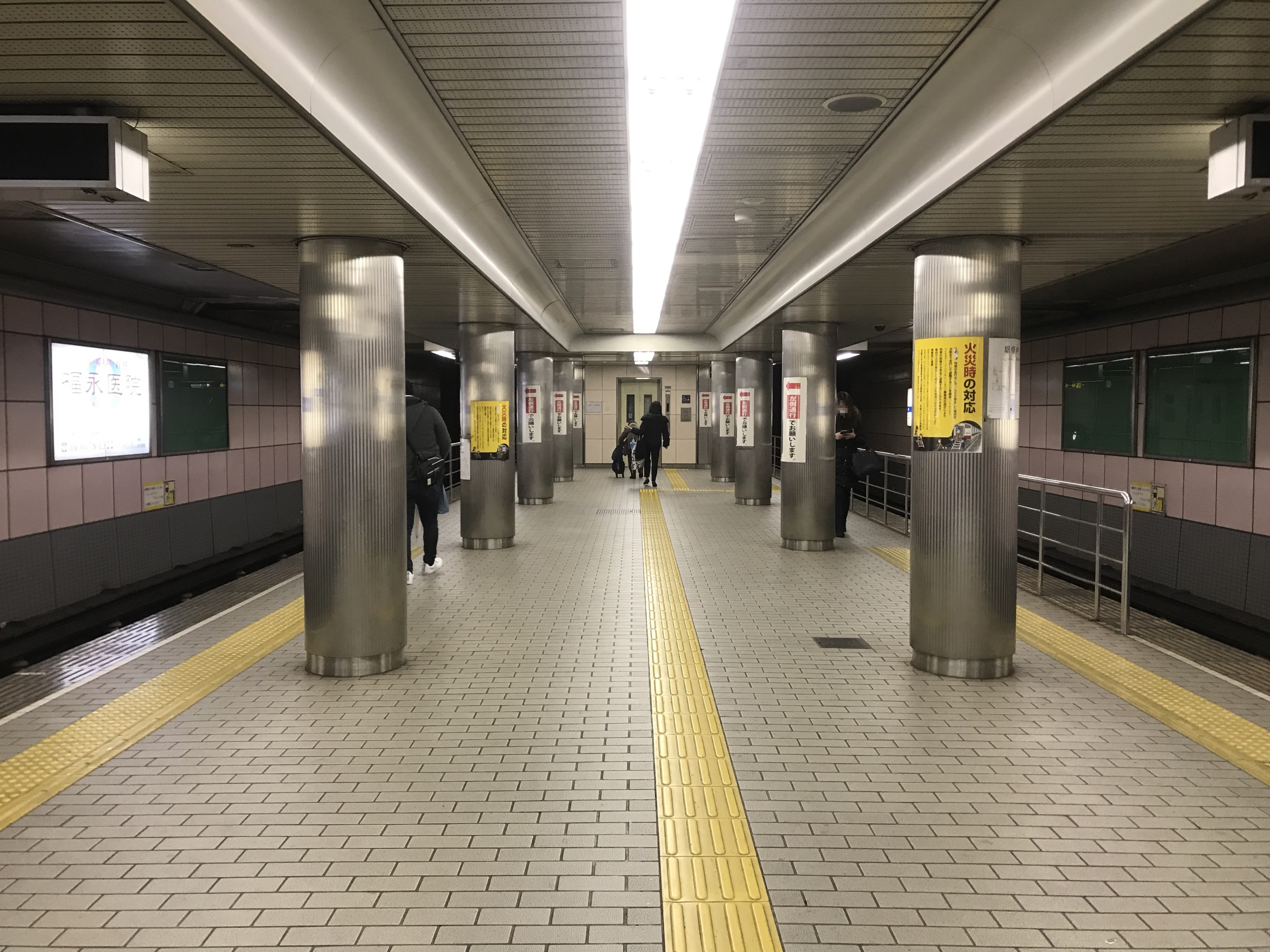
Platforms
