= Nishinakajima-Minamigata Station =

Metro station in Osaka, Japan

Coordinates: 34.7265°N 135.4984°E

Nishinakajima-Minamigata Station 西中島南方駅
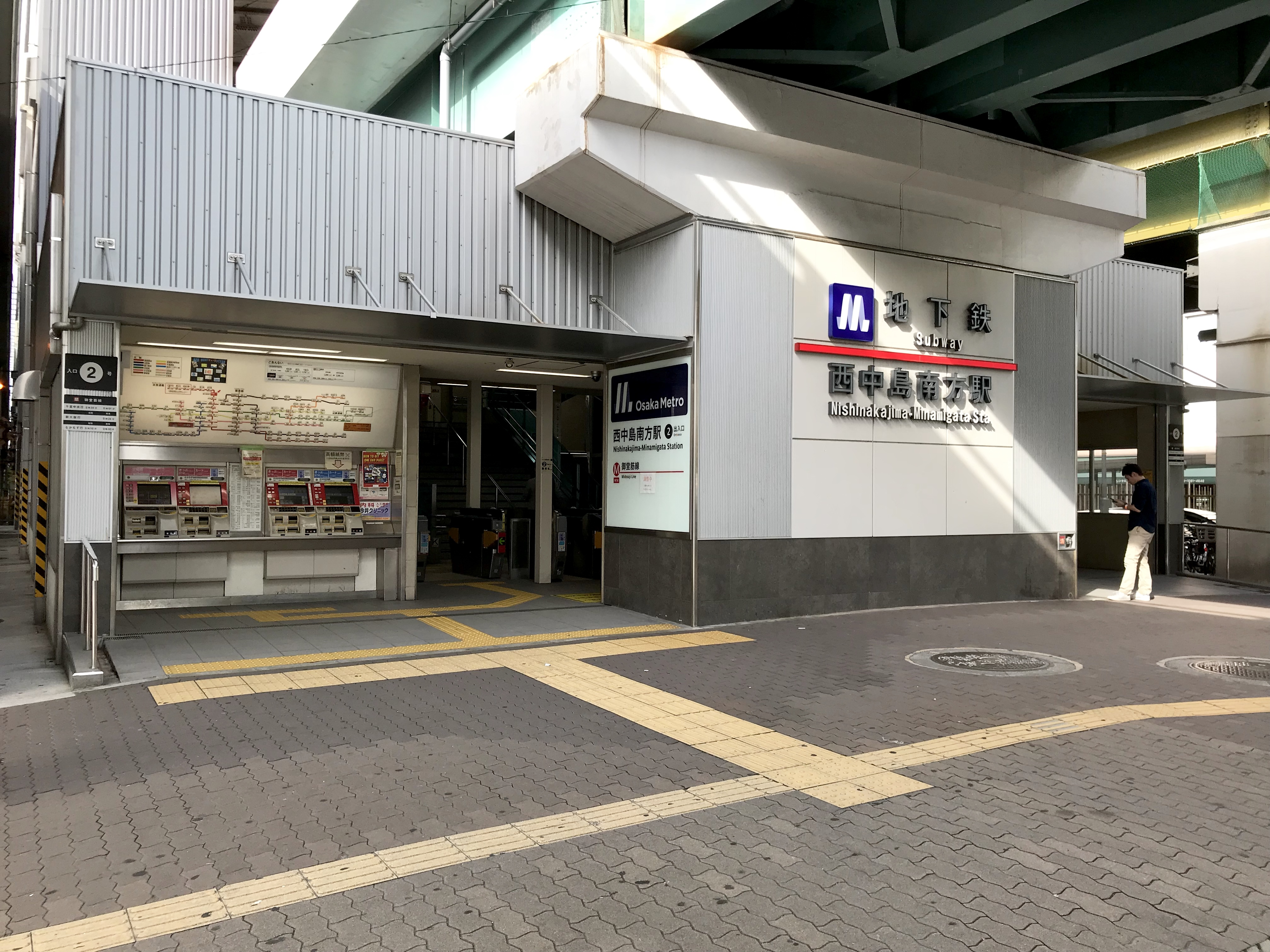
- Gate No. 2 (south side)

General information
- Location: 1-12-10 Nishinakajima, Yodogawa, Osaka, Osaka （大阪市淀川区西中島一丁目12-10） Japan
- System: Osaka Metro
- Operator: Osaka Metro
- Line: Midōsuji Line
- Platforms: 2 side platforms
- Tracks: 2
- Connections: Hankyu Kyoto Line (Minamkata Station)

Construction
- Structure type: Elevated

Other information
- Station code: M 14

History
- Opened: 24 September 1964; 61 years ago

Services
Preceding station	Osaka Metro	Following station
Shin-Ōsaka M 13 towards Esaka	Midōsuji Line	Nakatsu M 15 towards Nakamozu
Location
- Location within Osaka Prefecture Location within Japan

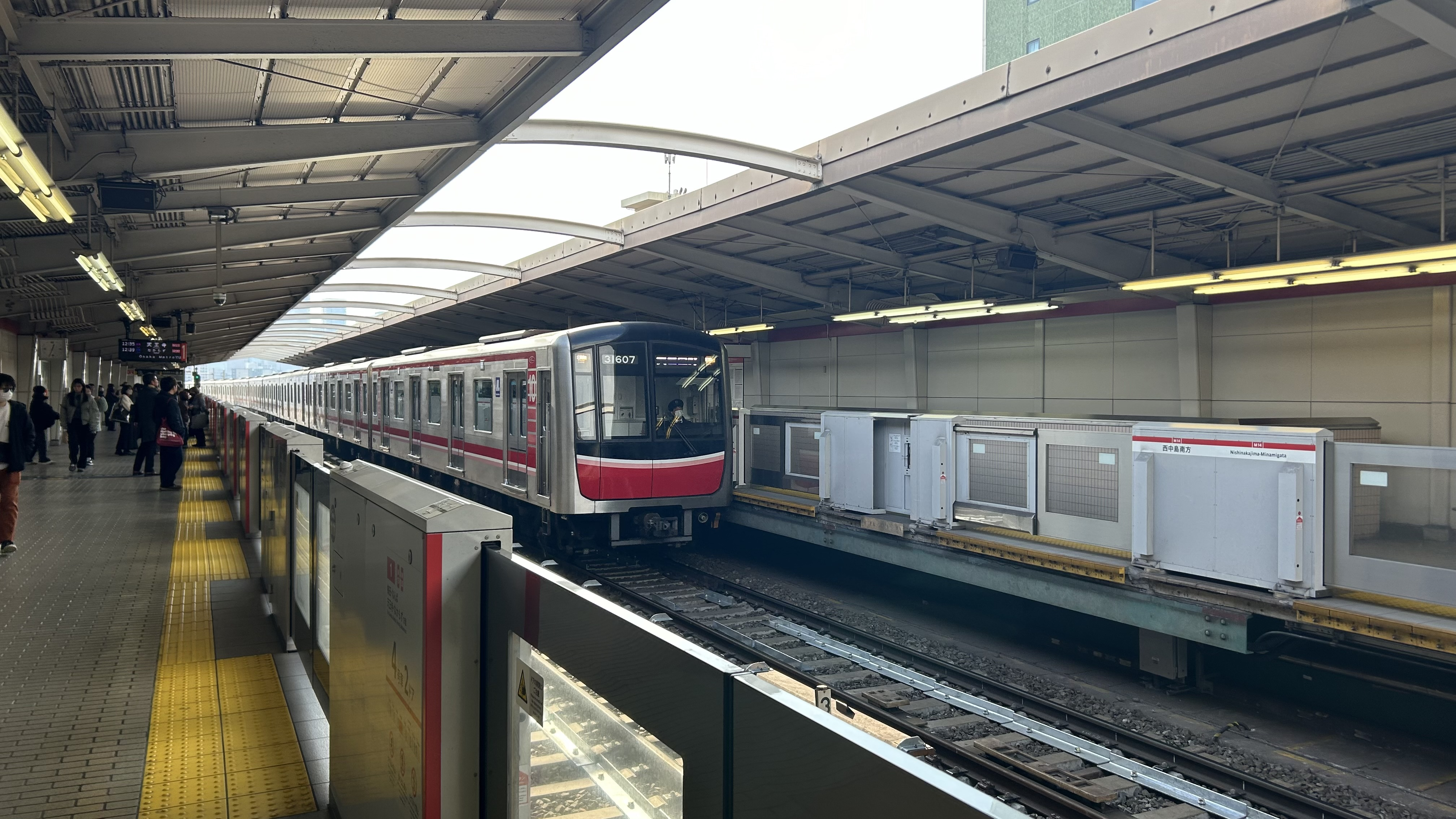
Tracks and platforms

Nishinakajima-Minamigata Station (西中島南方駅, Nishinakajima-Minamigata-eki; station number: M14) is a railway station on the Osaka Metro Midosuji Line in Yodogawa-ku, Osaka, Japan. It also serves as an interchange for Minamikata Station on the Hankyu Railway Kyoto Line.

== Connecting line from Nishinakajima-Minamigata ==
- Hankyu Kyoto Line (Minamikata Station)

== Station layout ==
The station has two elevated side platforms.

1	■ Midosuji Line	for Umeda, Namba, Tennoji, and Nakamozu
2	■ Midosuji Line	for Shin-Osaka, Esaka, and Minoh-kayano

== Passenger statistics ==
In fiscal 2022, the station was used by an average of 28,770 passengers daily (boarding passengers only).
