= Yotsubashi Line =

Metro line in Osaka prefecture, Japan

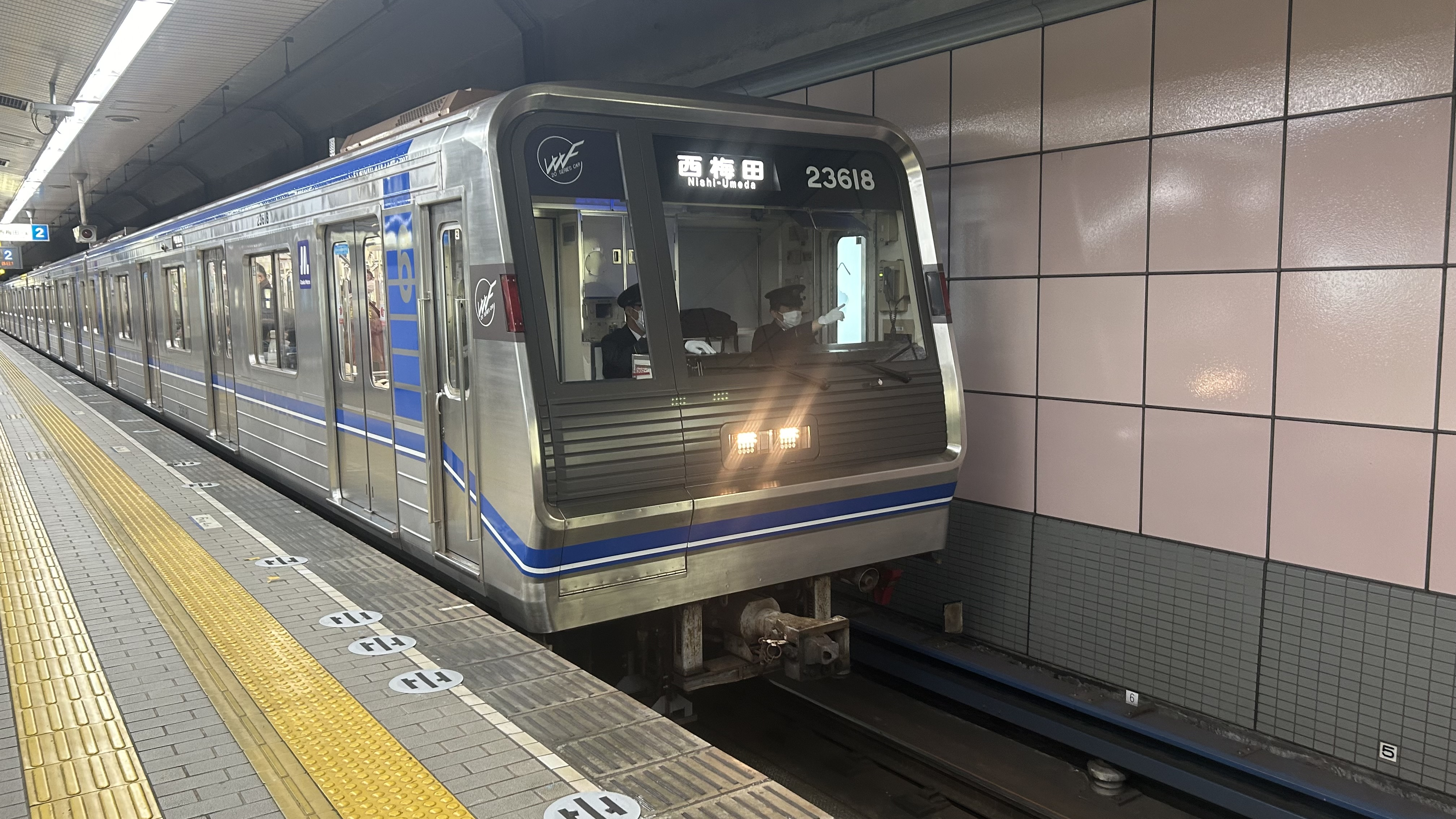
- A refurbished Yotsubashi Line 23 series

Overview
- Status: Operational
- Owner: Osaka Metro Co., Ltd. (2018–present); Osaka Municipal Transportation Bureau (1942–2018)
- Line number: 3
- Locale: Osaka, Japan
- Termini: Nishi-Umeda; Suminoekōen
- Stations: 11
- Color on map: Ocean blue (#0078BE)

Service
- Type: Rapid transit
- System: Osaka Metro
- Depot: Midorigi
- Rolling stock: 23 series EMUs

History
- Opened: May 10, 1942; 84 years ago
- Last extension: 1972

Technical
- Line length: 11.4 km (7.1 mi)
- Track length: 11.8 km (7.3 mi)
- Number of tracks: Double-track
- Track gauge: 1,435 mm (4 ft 8 1/2 in) standard gauge
- Electrification: 750 V DC (third rail)
- Operating speed: 70 km/h (43 mph)
- Signalling: Automatic closed block
- Train protection system: WS-ATC
Route map

The Yotsubashi Line (四つ橋線, Yotsubashi-sen) is an underground rapid transit line in Osaka, Japan, operated by Osaka Metro. The line connects Umeda, Hommachi, Yotsubashi, Namba, Daikokuchō and Suminoe, and runs parallel to the Midōsuji Line from Daikokuchō to Nishi-Umeda.

Despite being the system's second line to open, its official name is Rapid Electric Tramway Line No. 3 (高速電気軌道第3号線), while the Osaka Municipal Transportation Bureau refers to it as Osaka City Rapid Railway Line No. 3 (大阪市高速鉄道第3号線), and in Ministry of Land, Infrastructure and Transport publications, it is written as Line No. 3 (Yotsubashi Line) (3号線（四つ橋線）). Station numbers are indicated by the letter Y.

== Overview ==
The Yotsubashi Line runs in a north and south direction. connecting the Osaka Metro Nankō Port Town Line at Suminoekōen Station. At first, it was a branch of the Osaka Metro Midōsuji Line, branching off at Daikokuchō Station but was extended north to Nishi-Umeda Station and made a separate line. This new section of the Yotsubashi Line takes a more direct routing to Nishi-Umeda running only 300–400 m (0.19–0.25 mi) west of the Midosuji Line.

== History ==
- May 10, 1942 – Daikokuchō – Hanazonochō (opening)
- Construction stopped during World War II.
- June 1, 1956 – Hanazonochō – Kishinosato (opening)
- May 31, 1958 – Kishinosato – Tamade (opening)
- October 1, 1965 – Daikokuchō – Nishi-Umeda (opening)
- November 9, 1972 – Tamade – Suminoekōen (opening)

=== Future plans ===
A northward extension to Jūsō Station (with optional extension to Shin-Ōsaka Station) has been proposed since 1989.

== Operations ==
Most trains are operated between Nishi-Umeda station and Suminoe-Koen Station, with 2–3 minute interval during the morning rush hour, 6–7½ minute interval during the day, 3–4 minute intervals at the afternoon, 5–10 minute interval at night, and 10 minute interval in the early morning and late night. During the morning and evening (afternoon on weekends only), there are trains that only run between Kita-Kagaya station and Nishi Umeda Station, as Kita-Kagaya is connected to the Yotsubashi Line depot at Midorigi.

In addition, on the day of the Suminoe boat race at night (excluding Sundays), one special train operates between 9pm and 10pm.

It is connected with the New-Tram at Suminoe-Koen station.

On March 23, 2013, the Osaka Bureau of Transport revised the timetable for the Yotsubashi Line. By using the train that was a going to a depot without any passengers, the final train became 0:20am for the northbound and 0:10am (for Suminoe-Koen) and 0:36am (for Kita-Kagaya) for the southbound. And because of passenger demand, for weekdays between 10am and 12pm was changed from 5 minute to 6 minute interval and for weekends and on holidays between 10am and 3pm was changed from 5-6 minute interval to 7-7½ minute interval.

Since 2016, the regular inspection of the trains used on the third rail lines of Osaka Metro has been consolidated at Midorigi Depot, therefore trains of the Midosuji Line, Tanimachi Line, Chuo Line, and the Sennichimae Line may run on the Yotsubashi Line.

== Stations ==
All stations are in Osaka.

No.	Station	Japanese	Distance (km)	Connections	Location
Y 11	Nishi-Umeda	西梅田	0.0	Midōsuji Line (Umeda, M16); Tanimachi Line (Higashi-Umeda, T20); A JR Kyōto Line – (Tōkaidō Main Line, Ōsaka); A JR Kōbe Line – (Tōkaidō Main Line, Ōsaka); G JR Takarazuka Line – (Tōkaidō Main Line, Ōsaka); F Osaka Higashi Line – (Ōsaka); O Osaka Loop Line – (Ōsaka); H JR Tōzai Line – (Kitashinchi); Hankyu Railway; Kobe Line; Takarazuka Line; Kyoto Line; Hanshin Railway: Main Line	Kita-ku
Y 12	Higobashi	肥後橋	0.9	Keihan Nakanoshima Line – Watanabebashi	Nishi-ku
Y 13	Hommachi	本町	1.9	Chūō Line (C16); Midōsuji Line (M18)	Nishi-ku
Y 14	Yotsubashi	四ツ橋	2.9	Nagahori Tsurumi-ryokuchi Line – Shinsaibashi (N15); Midōsuji Line - Shinsaibashi (M19)	Nishi-ku
Y 15	Namba	難波・なんば	3.7	Sennichimae Line (S16); Midōsuji Line (M20); Nankai Railway: Nankai Main Line; Kōya Line; A Kintetsu Namba Line; Hanshin: Hanshin Namba Line; Q Yamatoji Line (Kansai Line)	Naniwa-ku
Y 16	Daikokuchō	大国町	4.9	Midōsuji Line	Naniwa-ku
Y 17	Hanazonochō	花園町	6.2		Nishinari-ku
Y 18	Kishinosato	岸里	7.3		Nishinari-ku
Y 19	Tamade	玉出	8.6		Nishinari-ku
Y 20	Kitakagaya	北加賀屋	9.7		Suminoe-ku
Y 21	Suminoekōen	住之江公園	11.4	Nankō Port Town Line (P18)	Suminoe-ku

== Rolling stock ==
=== Current ===
- 23 series (since 1990)

All trains are based at Midorigi Depot. Since 1996, all trains are 6 cars long but subway platforms are long enough to accommodate trains up to 8 cars long.

=== Former ===
- 400 series (1942–1969)
- 1000 series (1956–1971)
- 1100 series (1958–1979)
- 1200 series (1958–1980)
- 50 series (1960–1980)
- 30 series (1972–1996)

== See also ==
- List of railway electrification systems in Japan
