= Yotsubashi Station =

Metro station in Osaka, Japan

Coordinates: 34°40′26.75″N 135°29′48.40″E

Yotsubashi Station 四ツ橋駅
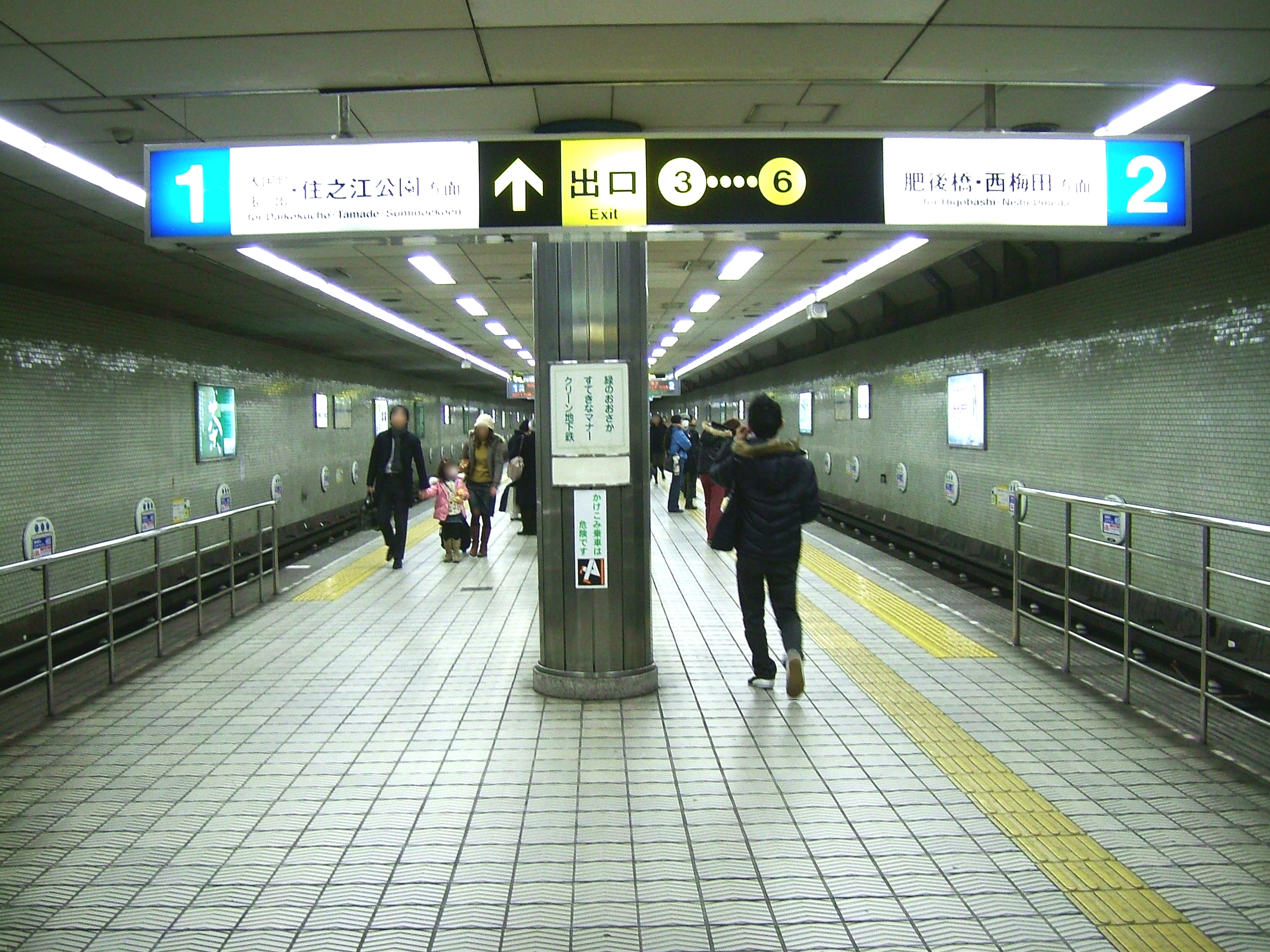
- Station platform

General information
- System: Osaka Metro
- Operator: Osaka Metro
- Line: Yotsubashi Line
- Connections: M 19 N 15 Shinsaibashi: Midōsuji Line; Nagahori Tsurumi-ryokuchi Line

Construction
- Structure type: Underground

Other information
- Station code: Y 14

History
- Opened: 1 October 1965; 60 years ago

Services
Preceding station	Osaka Metro	Following station
Hommachi Y 13 towards Nishi-Umeda	Yotsubashi Line	Namba Y 15 towards Suminoekōen
Location
- Location within Osaka Prefecture Location within Japan

Yotsubashi Station (四ツ橋駅, Yotsubashi-eki) is a railway station on the Osaka Metro Yotsubashi Line in Nishi-ku, Osaka, Japan.

== History ==
- October 1, 1965 - The station was opened.
- December 11, 1996 - The station gains a direct transfer via moving walkway to the neighbouring Shinsaibashi Station, after the Nagahori Tsurumi-ryokuchi Line was extended from Kyōbashi to Shinsaibashi.

== Lines ==
- Osaka Metro
  - Yotsubashi Line (Station number: Y14)

Yotsubashi Station is treated as the same station as Shinsaibashi Station for the purpose of fare calculation. Shinsaibashi Station is served by the following lines:

- Midōsuji Line (M19)
- Nagahori Tsurumi-ryokuchi Line (N15)

== Layout ==
This station has an island platform serving two tracks on the second basement in the west of Shinsaibashi Station on the Nagahori Tsurumi-ryokuchi Line.

1	■ Yotsubashi Line	for Namba, Daikokucho and Suminoekoen
2	■ Yotsubashi Line	for Nishi-Umeda

== Surroundings ==
- Amerikamura
- Crysta Nagahori
- Horie
- Osaka School of Music
- Orix Theater
