= Osaka Metro (company) =

Rapid transit company of Osaka, Japan

Osaka Metro Co., Ltd
- Trade name: Osaka Metro
- Native name: 大阪市高速電気軌道株式会社
- Type: Private (Municipally owned kabushiki gaisha)
- Industry: Transportation
- Predecessor: Osaka Municipal Transportation Bureau
- Incorporated: June 1, 2017; 9 years ago
- Founded: April 1, 2018; 8 years ago (effective corporatization of Osaka Municipal Transportation Bureau)
- Founder: Osaka Municipal Government
- Headquarters: Nishi-ku, Osaka, Japan
- Area served: Keihanshin
- Owner: Osaka Municipal Government (100%)
- Number of employees: 4,936 (2019)
- Subsidiaries: Osaka City Bus Corporation
- Website: www.osakametro.co.jp/en/

The Osaka Metro Co., Ltd. (大阪市高速電気軌道株式会社, Ōsaka-shi Kōsoku Denki Kidō kabushiki gaisha; lit. "Osaka Municipal Rapid Electric Tramway Share Company" (Note: The "rapid electric tramway" (高速電気軌道, kōsoku denki kidō) part is used due to the fact that Osaka Metro lines are officially named "Rapid Electric Tramway Line No. X" (with X referring to the line number); see individual line articles for example)) is a municipally owned stock company wholly owned by the City of Osaka operating nine subway lines and also engaged in real estate and retail businesses in the Osaka metropolitan area.

Established on April 1, 2018 through the privatization of the Osaka Municipal Transportation Bureau, which had previously managed the city's subway system since 1933. This transition marked Japan's second privatization of a municipal subway operator after Tokyo Metro Co., Ltd. (2004), allowing Osaka Metro to take over the operation of eight subway lines and the New Tram system while aiming for enhanced efficiency and service innovation.

The company is headquartered in Nishi-ku, Osaka, and operates under a corporate framework designed to support both urban transit and community development initiatives.

== Management ==
The Osaka Metro Co. is the direct legal successor to the Osaka Municipal Transportation Bureau, which operated the subway as the Osaka Municipal Subway (Note: 大阪市営地下鉄, Ōsaka-shiei chikatetsu); under the Bureau's management, the subway was the oldest publicly operated subway network in Japan, having begun operations in 1933. A proposal to corporatize the Osaka subway was sent to the city government in February 2013 and was given final approval in 2017. The rationale behind corporatization is that it would bring private investors to Osaka and could help revive Osaka's economy. The Osaka Metro Co. was incorporated on June 1, 2017, and took over operations on April 1, 2018.

The Osaka Metro Co. also operates all city buses in Osaka, through its majority-owned subsidiary, the Osaka City Bus Corporation.

=== Structure ===
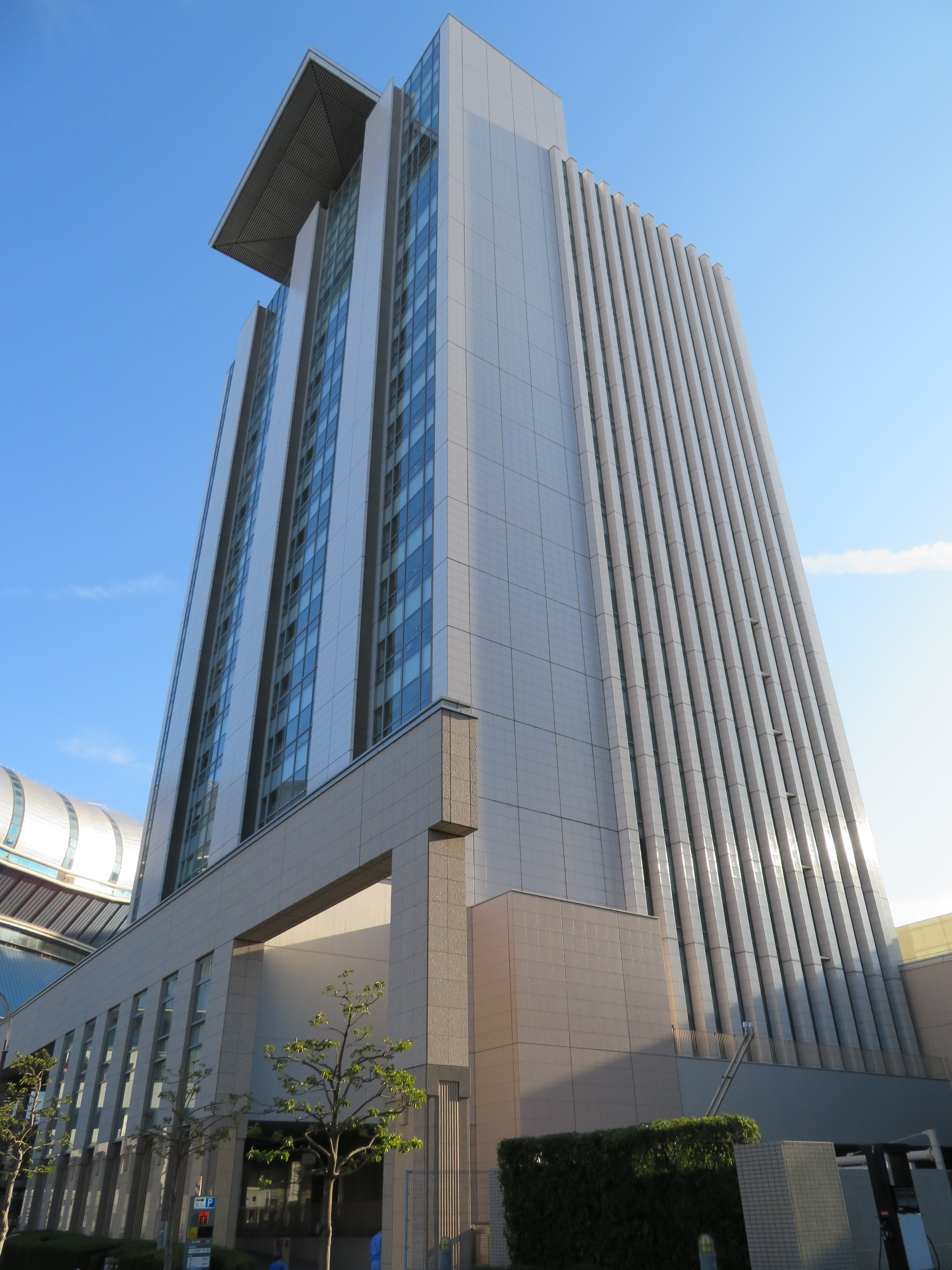
Headquarters in Nishi

Osaka Metro’s organizational structure is built around several core operational departments responsible for managing and maintaining its extensive transit network. Principal units include the Subway Operations Division, which oversees day-to-day service on the eight subway lines; the New Tram Operations Division, responsible for the automated guideway transit system serving the Nankō Port Town area; and the Station Management Division, which manages passenger services, fare collection, and facility operations across the system’s 133 stations. These functions are supported by specialized maintenance and engineering teams tasked with rolling stock servicing, infrastructure maintenance, and the implementation of technical upgrades. Together, these divisions coordinate operations across approximately 137.8 kilometres of route, with a strong emphasis on safety and operational efficiency in a densely populated urban setting.

According to recent data, Osaka Metro employs roughly 4,500 personnel across a range of functions, including train operations, engineering, maintenance, and customer service. This workforce supports daily ridership exceeding 2.5 million passengers and ensures continuous system operation, from signal monitoring and vehicle inspections to station accessibility improvements.

The company also maintains cooperative arrangements with other railway operators in the Kansai region to improve network connectivity. Notable examples include through-service operations on the Sakaisuji Line with Hankyu Railway, enabling direct trains to operate onto the Senri and Arashiyama lines. In addition, Osaka Metro collaborates with JR West and Keihan Electric Railway on initiatives such as integrated ticketing schemes, joint promotional campaigns, and transport planning related to Expo 2025, contributing to more seamless interline travel and enhanced regional mobility.

=== Branding ===
Osaka Metro stations are denoted by the Osaka Metro Co.'s corporate logo, a white-on-dark-blue icon placed at ground-level entrances, depicting an "M" (for "Metro") based on a coiled ribbon, which would form an "O" (for "Osaka") when viewed from the side (this symbol is officially called the "moving M"), with the "Osaka Metro" wordmark set in the Gotham typeface. "Osaka Metro" (in Latin characters) is the official branding in Japanese, and is always represented as such in official media. (News outlets have been seen to use 大阪メトロ, presumably to better flow with article text.) Individual lines are represented by a public-facing name (e.g. "Midōsuji Line" for Rapid Electric Tramway Line No. 1) and a specific color, as well as a single Latin letter, which is paired with a different number at each station for easy identification (see below). Icons for each line (featured in station wayfinding signage) are represented by a solid roundel in the line color, superimposed with the line's letter-designation in the Parisine typeface.

An older branding (also used on the original tram network run by the city until 1969) is the "Mio-Den" mark, which depicts an old-fashioned depth-marker, (澪標, mio-tsukushi), the logo for Osaka City, over the kanji for electricity (電, den), short for "electric train" (電車, densha). This mark is still present on newer trainsets and staff uniforms as Osaka Metro retained it as its monsho, as well as a connection to the subway network's roots.

When it was run by the Osaka Municipal Transportation Bureau, the subway used a logo known as the "Circle-Ko" (マルコ, Maru-Ko) symbol, which is a katakana "ko" (コ) for "Urban rail transit" (高速鉄道, kōsoku tetsudō) superimposed over a circular capital "O" for "Osaka" (see infobox, above). This remained on many older trainsets and at stations, until it was completely replaced by the Osaka Metro logo by 2020.

Logo

"moving M" logo

Company emblem (Mio-den)

"Maru-Ko" former symbol

== Ownership ==
Osaka Metro Co., Ltd. is a wholly owned subsidiary of the Osaka Municipal Government, functioning as a public stock company following the privatization of the subway operations previously managed by the Osaka City Transportation Bureau in April 2018. This ownership model preserves direct public control while introducing corporate-style management intended to improve operational efficiency and financial performance. As of 2025, the company remains entirely publicly owned, with no reported changes to its shareholder structure, ensuring continued alignment with municipal transportation policy objectives.

Corporate governance is exercised by a board of directors composed of representatives from public-sector stakeholders, including municipal officials, alongside external experts from the private sector. This structure is designed to balance public accountability with managerial expertise. The board is responsible for overseeing strategic planning, major capital investments, safety standards, and long-term network development. In accordance with Japan’s Companies Act, Osaka Metro is subject to annual financial disclosure requirements, providing transparency and accountability to its sole shareholder.

Osaka Metro’s revenue base is diversified, with passenger fares contributing approximately 70 percent of operating income. Additional revenue is generated through government subsidies supporting infrastructure maintenance, as well as non-transport activities such as station-area real estate development, retail leasing, and advertising. In fiscal year 2024 (ending 31 March 2025), total operating revenue amounted to ¥202.9 billion, reflecting growth driven by increased ridership and urban development initiatives. Net profit attributable to the parent entity was reported at ¥29.3 billion. This multi-source funding structure supports ongoing capital investment while reducing dependence on fare revenue alone.

Regulatory supervision is provided by the Ministry of Land, Infrastructure, Transport and Tourism (MLIT), which enforces national standards related to railway safety, environmental protection, and system expansion. Osaka Metro is required to comply with MLIT regulations, including periodic audits and certification processes for new infrastructure, as well as guidelines concerning operational reliability and disaster preparedness, ensuring consistency with national and regional transportation policies.

== Group companies ==
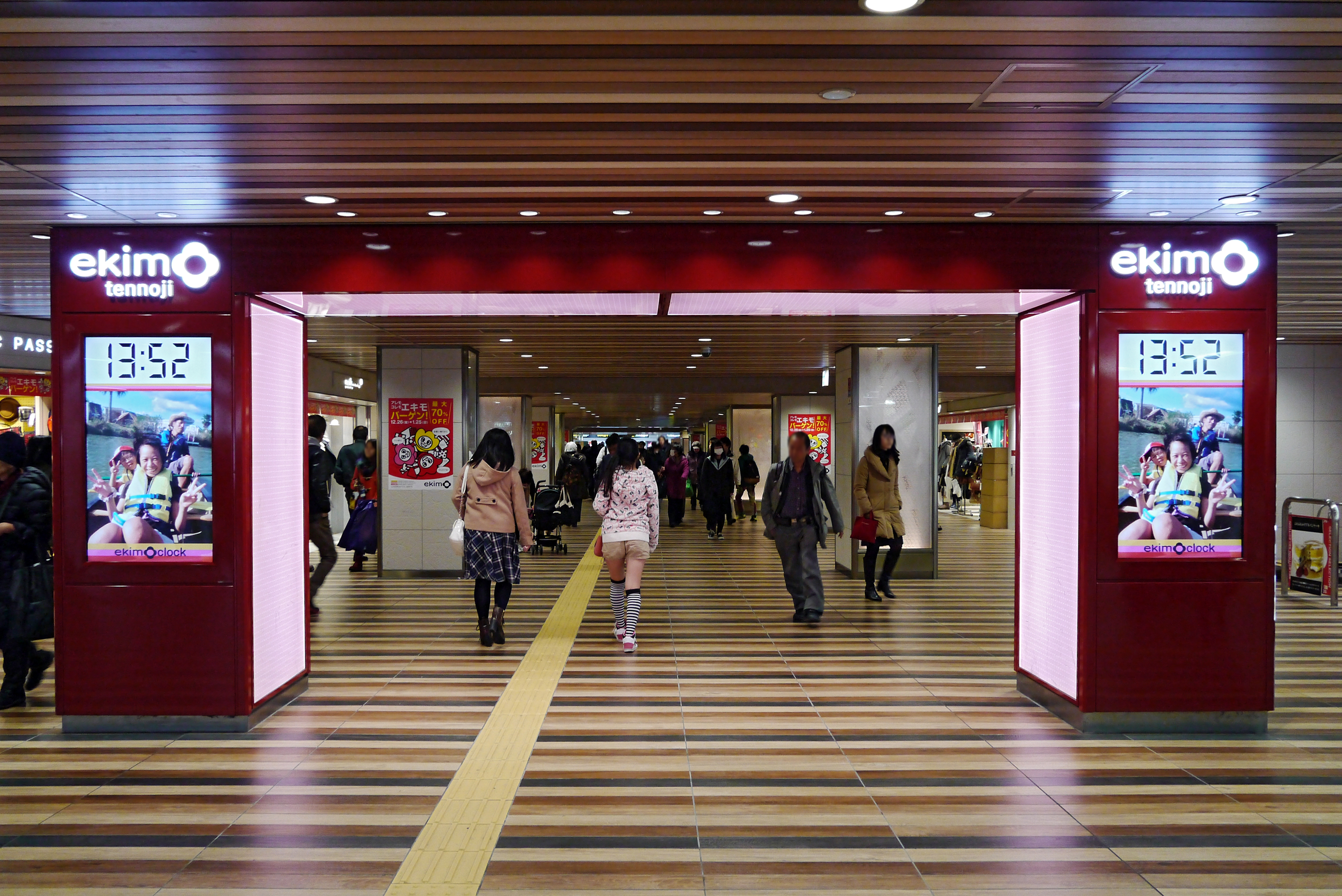
Ekimo Tennoji operated by Osaka Underground Mall Co., Ltd.

In addition to its railway and bus operations, the company operates station-based and retail businesses, including the ekimo commercial facilities. These facilities are managed and operated by its group company, Osaka Underground Mall Co., Ltd. (大阪地下街株式会社), and include locations such as ON the UMEDA.

As part of its urban development and real estate business, the company is involved in the development and management of commercial buildings, including the Tenjinbashisuji Rokuchome Building and the Namba Building, as well as rental housing under the Metrosa brand and residential property sales under the METRISE brand.

== See also ==
- Osaka Metro
- Transport in Keihanshin
- List of Osaka Metro stations
- Tokyo Metro Co., Ltd.
