= Arashiyama Line =

Arashiyama Line may refer to:

- Hankyū Arashiyama Line
- Keifuku Arashiyama Main Line, see Keifuku Electric Railroad
