= Daikokuchō Station =

Metro station in Osaka, Japan

Daikokuchō Station 大国町
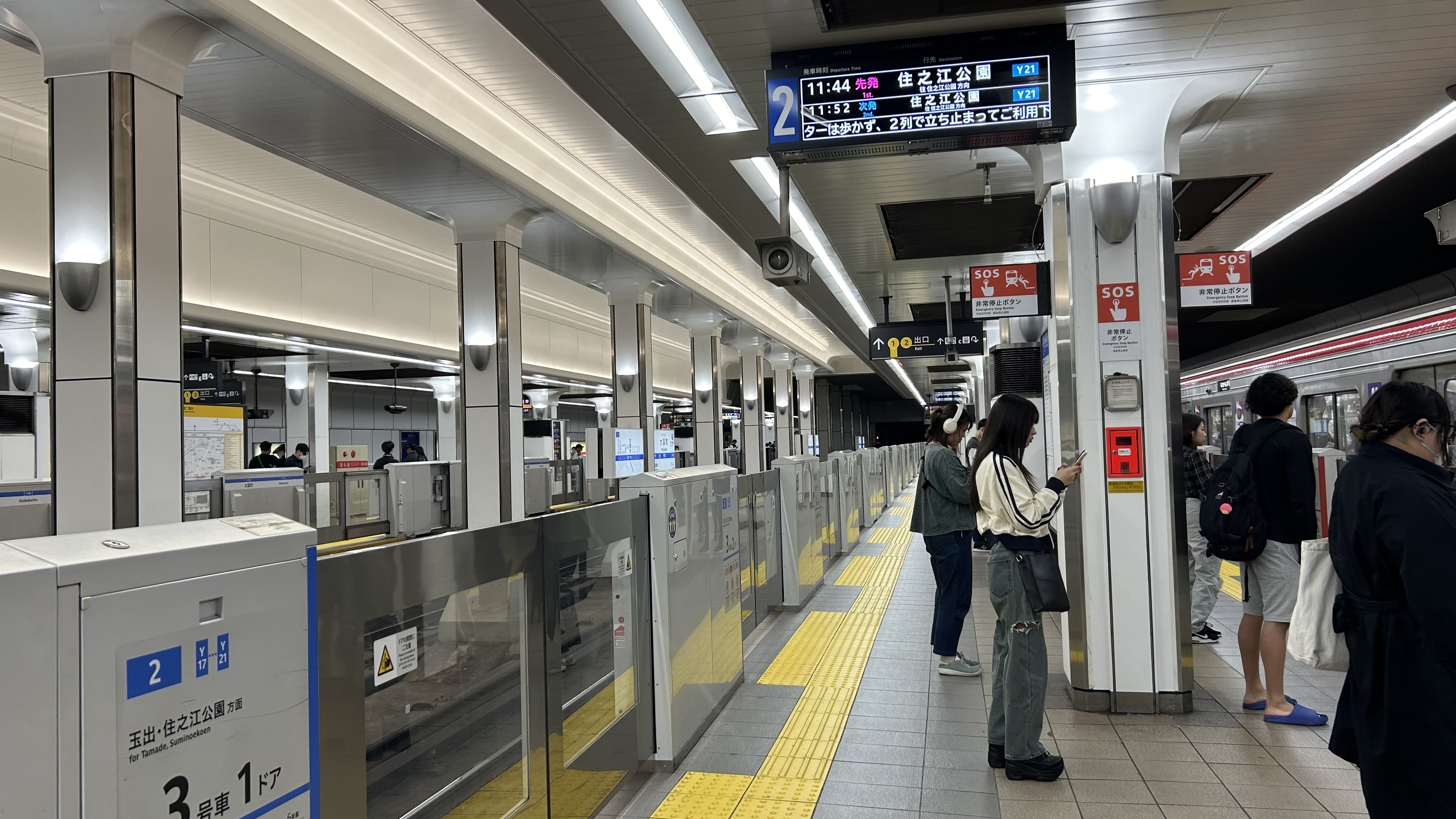
- Station platforms

General information
- Location: Shikitsu-higashi Sanchome, Naniwa, Osaka, Osaka （大阪市浪速区敷津東三丁目） Japan
- Coordinates: 34°39′21.86″N 135°29′52.09″E
- System: Osaka Metro
- Operator: Osaka Metro
- Lines: Midōsuji Line; Yotsubashi Line
- Platforms: 2 island platforms with cross-platform interchange
- Tracks: 4

Other information
- Station code: M 21 Y 16

History
- Opened: 21 April 1938; 88 years ago

Passengers
- FY2016: 30,978 daily

Services
| Preceding station | Osaka Metro | Following station |
|---|---|---|
| Namba M 20 towards Esaka | Midōsuji Line | Dōbutsuen-mae M 22 towards Nakamozu |
| Namba Y 15 towards Nishi-Umeda | Yotsubashi Line | Hanazonochō Y 17 towards Suminoekōen |
Track layout
Location
- Location within Osaka Prefecture Location within Japan

Daikokuchō Station (大国町駅, Daikokuchō-eki) is a railway station on the Osaka Metro in Shikitsu-higashi Sanchome, Naniwa-ku, Osaka, Japan.

== Lines ==
- Osaka Metro
  - Midōsuji Line (Station Number: M21)
  - Yotsubashi Line(Station Number: Y16)

While Midōsuji and Yotsubashi lines are connected at several stations, Daikokuchō is the only such station where passengers can transfer the trains from one line to the other on the same platform in case of trains of same direction (cross-platform interchange).

== Layout ==
This station has two island platforms on the second basement, serving four tracks.

| G | Street Level | Exit / Entrance |
| B1F | Mezzanine | Ticket barriers, ticket/ICOCA/PiTaPa machines, restrooms |
| B2F; Platform level | Platform 1 | Midōsuji Line towards Nakamozu (Dobutsuen-mae) → |
| B2F; Platform level | Island platform, doors will open on the right/left |
| B2F; Platform level | Platform 2 | Yotsubashi Line towards Suminoekōen (Hanazonocho) → |
| B2F; Platform level | Platform 3 | ← Yotsubashi Line towards Nishi-Umeda (Namba) |
| B2F; Platform level | Island platform, doors will open on the left/right |
| B2F; Platform level | Platform 4 | ← Midōsuji Line towards Esaka (Namba) (through service to Minoh-kayano on the Kitakyu Namboku Line) |

| 1 | ■ Midōsuji Line | for Tennōji and Nakamozu |
| 2 | ■ Yotsubashi Line | for Tamade and Suminoekōen |

| 3 | ■ Yotsubashi Line | for Yotsubashi, Higobashi and Nishi-Umeda |
| 4 | ■ Midōsuji Line | for Umeda, Shin-Osaka, Esaka and Minoh-kayano |

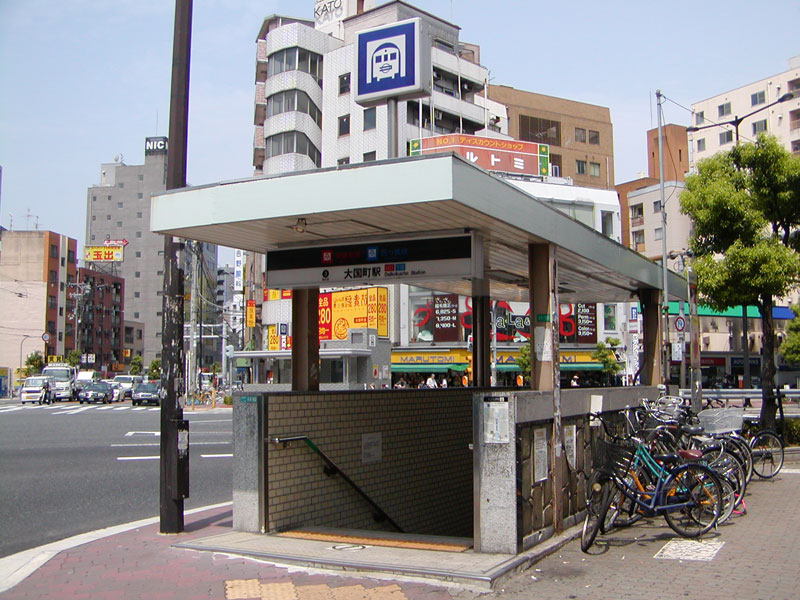
Exit 3 (2008)
