= Nishi-Umeda Station =

Metro station in Osaka, Japan

Nishi-Umeda Station 西梅田駅
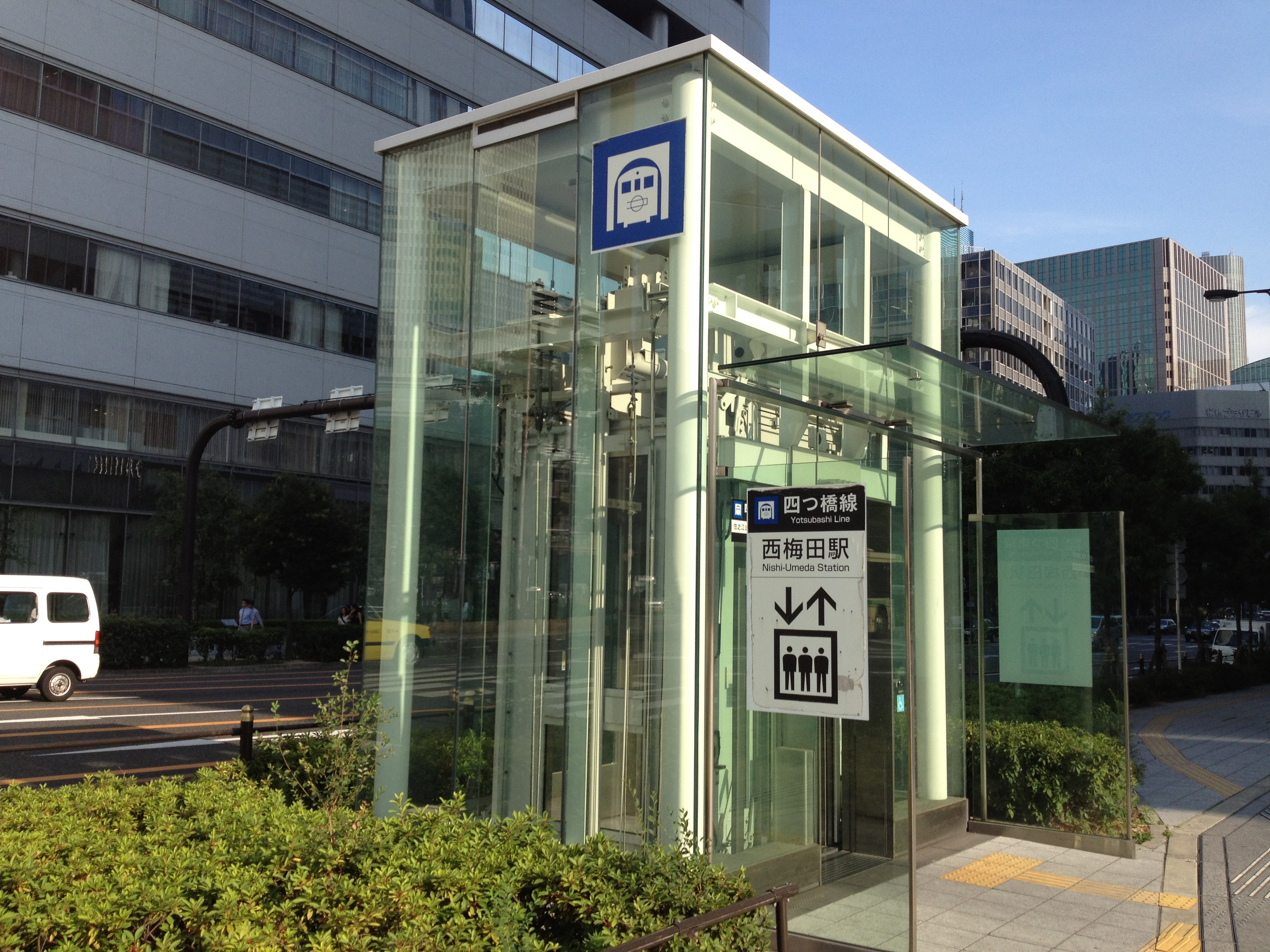
- Nishi-Umeda Station entrance elevator (2012)

General information
- Location: Umeda Nichōme, Kita, Osaka, Osaka （大阪市北区梅田二丁目） Japan
- Coordinates: 34°41′58.58″N 135°29′44.4″E
- System: Osaka Metro
- Operator: Osaka Metro
- Line: Yotsubashi Line
- Connections: Osaka Station, Kitashinchi Station, Umeda Station and Higashi-Umeda Station

Other information
- Station code: Y 11

History
- Opened: October 1, 1965; 60 years ago

Passengers
- FY2016: 113,949 daily

Services
Preceding station	Osaka Metro	Following station
Terminus	Yotsubashi Line	Higobashi Y 12 towards Suminoekōen
Location
- Location within Osaka Prefecture Location within Japan

Nishi-Umeda Station (西梅田駅, Nishi-Umeda-eki; Y11) is the terminus railway station of the Osaka Metro Yotsubashi Line in Umeda, Kita-ku, Osaka, Japan, close to Herbis OSAKA and Herbis ENT operated by Hanshin Electric Railway Co., Ltd. and the two Hilton Plazas.

== Connecting lines from Nishi-Umeda ==
- Osaka Metro
  - Midōsuji Line (Umeda Station, M16)
  - Tanimachi Line (Higashi-Umeda Station, T20)
- JR West (JR West)
  - Tokaido Main Line (JR Kyoto Line, JR Kobe Line, JR Takarazuka Line), Osaka Loop Line (Osaka Station)
  - JR Tōzai Line (Kitashinchi Station)
- Hankyu Railway (Umeda Station)
  - Kobe Line
  - Takarazuka Line
  - Kyoto Line
- Hanshin Electric Railway Main Line (Umeda Station)

When using regular tickets of Osaka Metro, Surutto Kansai cards, and IC cards (PiTaPa, ICOCA), it is limited to 30 minutes to change to the Midosuji Line and the Tanimachi Line.

== Layout ==
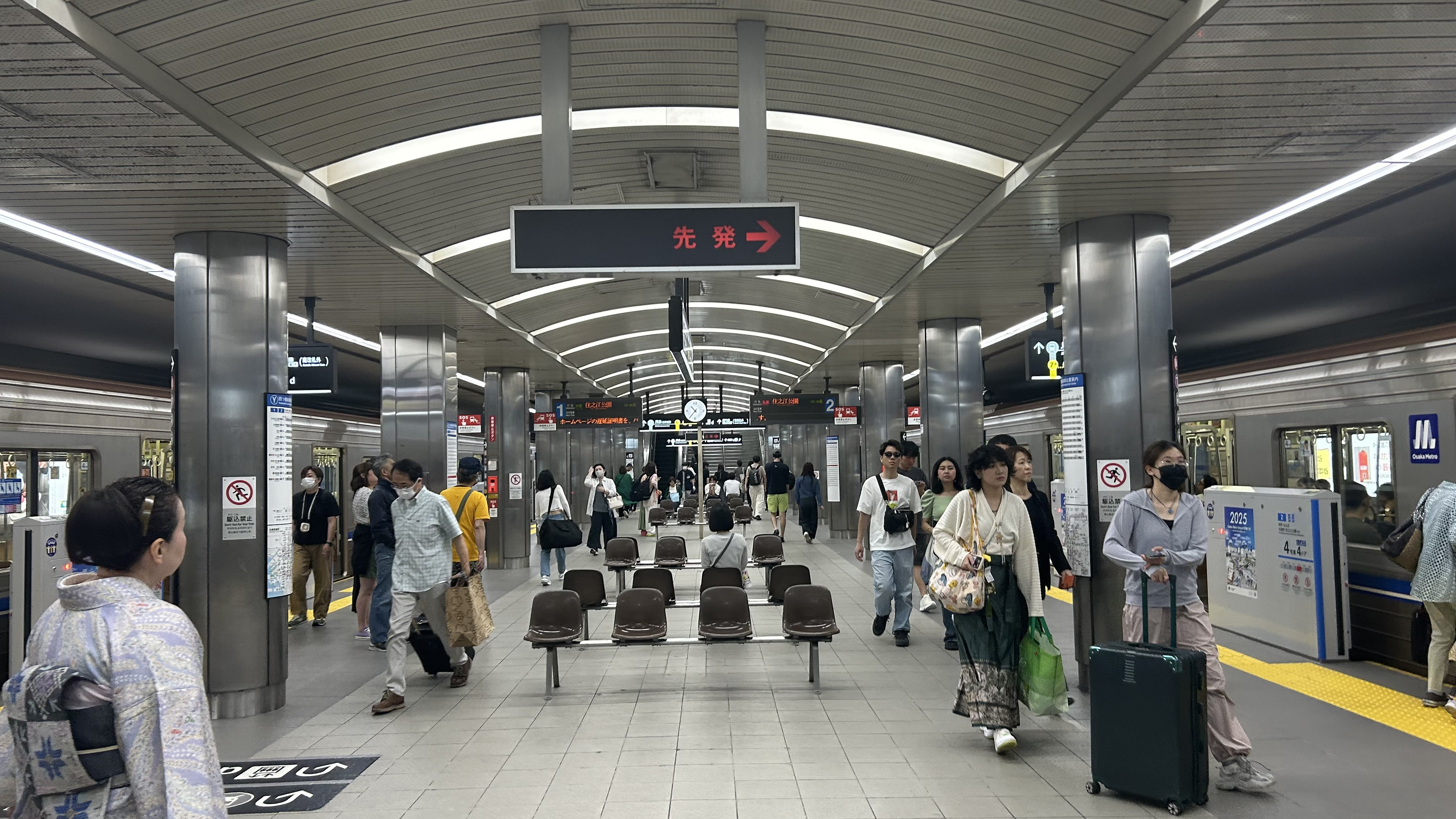
Station platform in June 2024

- There is an island platform with two tracks on the third basement. On the second basement, north ticket gate is used for exit, center ticket gate for entrance, and south ticket gate for both entrance and exit.

1, 2	■ Yotsubashi Line	for Yotsubashi, Namba, Daikokucho, Kitakagaya and Suminoekoen

== Surroundings ==
- Diamor Osaka
- Hanshin Department Store (operated by Hankyu Hanshin Department Stores, Inc.)
- South Gate Building
  - Daimaru Umeda
  - Hotel Granvia Osaka
  - Pokémon Center Osaka
- Osaka City Bus terminal
- Expressway bus terminal
- Osaka Marubiru
- Osaka Garden City
  - Herbis OSAKA
    - the Ritz-Carlton Osaka
  - Herbis ENT
    - Osaka Shiki Theatre
    - Billboard Live Osaka
- the Hilton Plaza East
  - Hilton Osaka
  - Junkudo Umeda
- the Hilton Plaza West
- the Mainichi Shimbun Building (the Mainichi Shimbun, Sports Nippon)
- Osaka Ekimae Buildings
  - Osaka Central Post Office
- Breezé Tower
  - Sankei Hall Breezé
  - Nippon Ham
- Dojima Underground Shopping Center (Dotica)
- Dojima Avanza
  - Junkudo Osaka
