= Osaka Metro =

Rapid transit system in Keihanshin, Japan

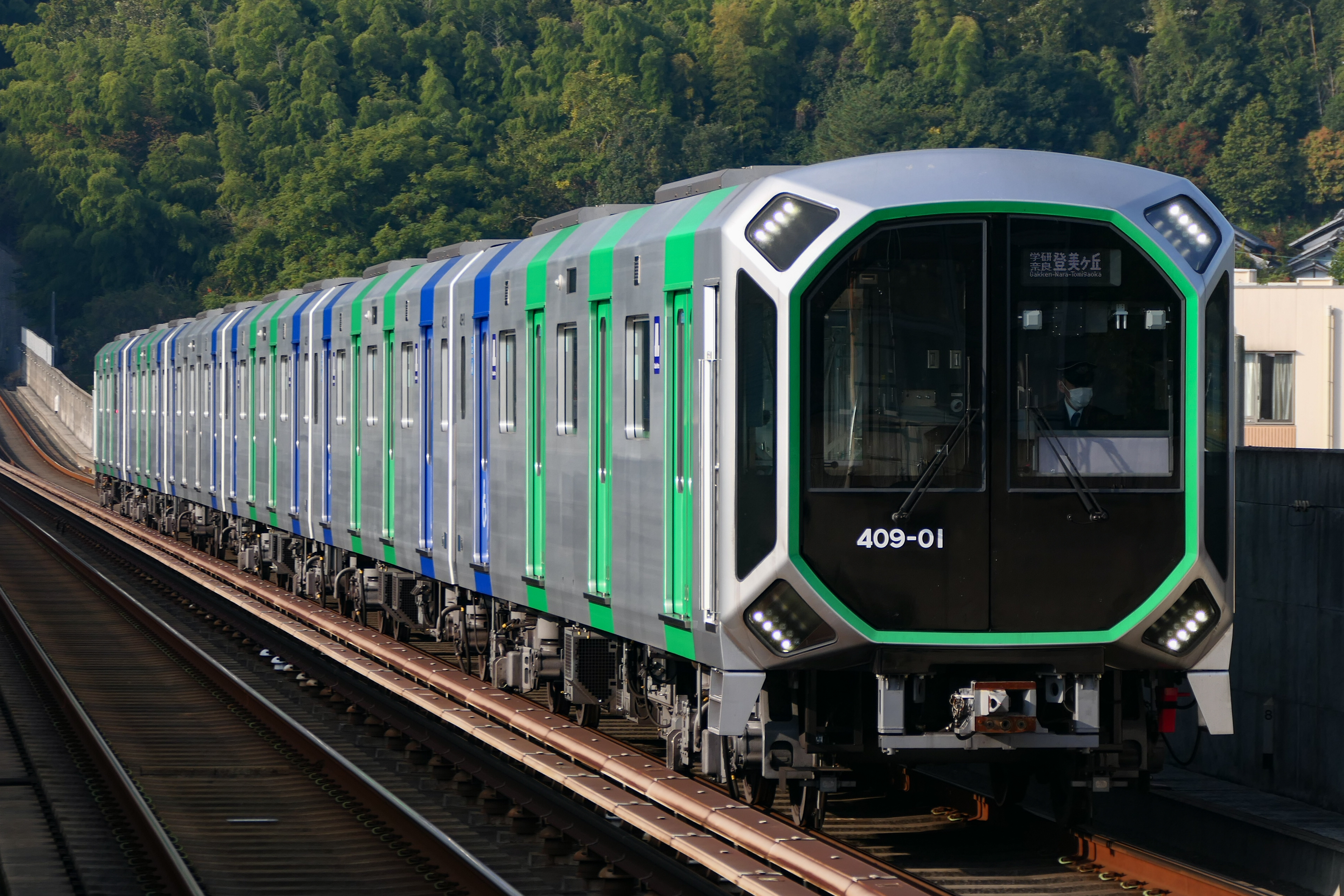
- A 400 series train on the Chuo Line.

Overview
- Owner: Osaka Metro Co., Ltd.
- Locale: Keihanshin region, Japan
- Transit type: Tram and rail (Note: The Osaka Metro Company de jure operates transit that is subject to both the Tram Act and Railway Business Act.) (de jure); Metro; AGT (de facto)
- Number of lines: 8 (+ 1 People Mover)
- Number of stations: 124; 134 (incl. People Mover)
- Daily ridership: 2,464,000 (FY2013)

Operation
- Began operation: 20 May 1933; 93 years ago
- Operators: Osaka Municipal Transportation Bureau (1933–2018); Osaka Metro Co. (2018–present)

Technical
- System length: 133.1 km (82.7 mi); 141 km (88 mi) (incl. People Mover)
- Track gauge: 1,435 mm (4 ft 8 1/2 in) standard gauge
- Electrification: 750 V DC third rail 1,500 V DC overhead catenary (Note: Sakaisuji, Nagahori Tsurumi-ryokuchi and Imazatosuji lines); 600 V 3-phase AC 60 Hz third rail (Note: Nankō Port Town Line)
- Top speed: 70 km/h (43 mph)
System map
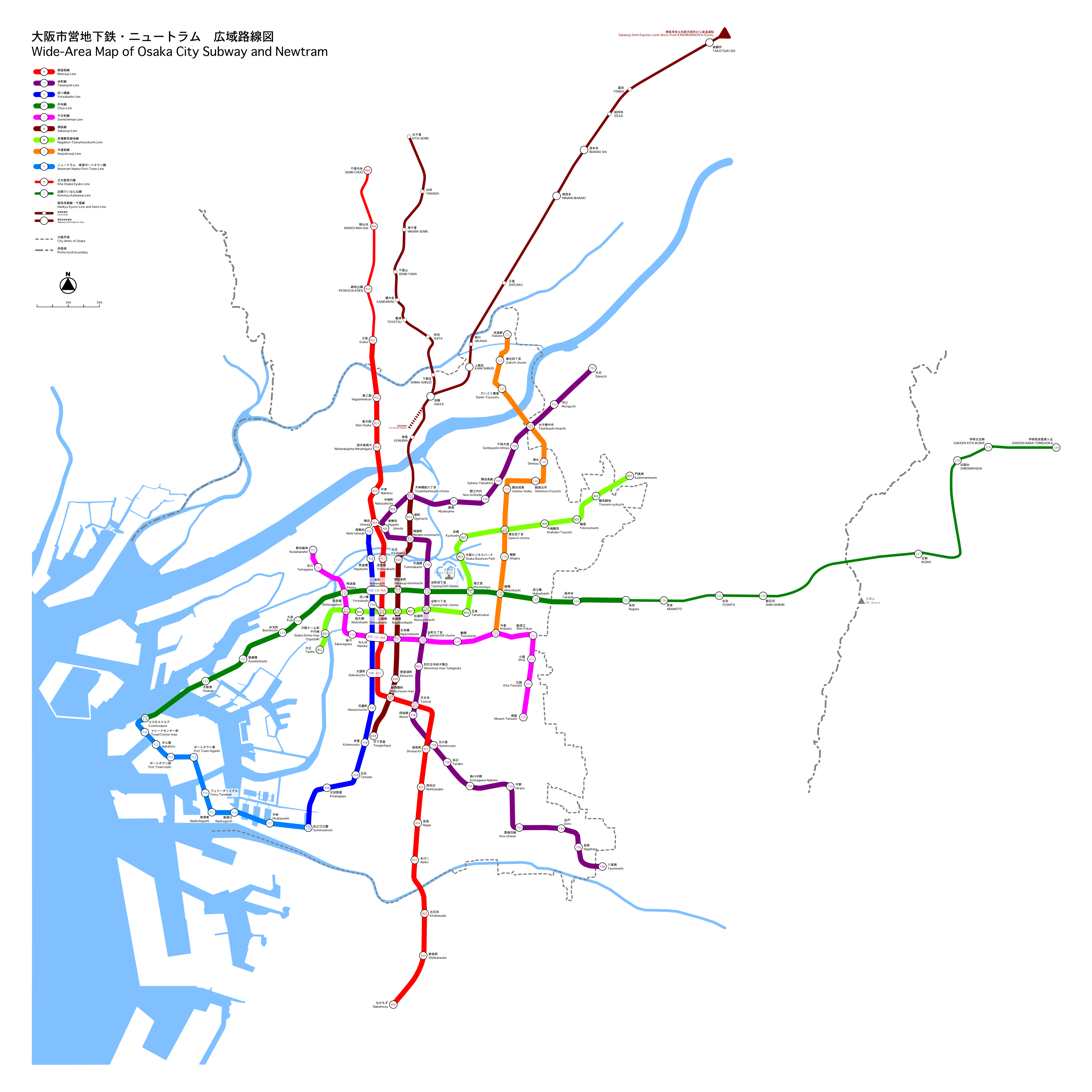

The Osaka Metro (Note: Pronounced Ōsaka Metoro (オオサカ メトロ) in Japanese. The official name of the network is written with Latin characters, and so is rendered in corporate materials. Outside this context, the name can be seen written with Japanese characters as 大阪メトロ.) is a major rapid transit system in the Osaka metropolitan area of Japan, operated by Osaka Metro Co., Ltd., and originally opened in 1933 as the Osaka Municipal Subway.

Osaka Metro forms an integral part of the extensive mass transit system of Greater Osaka (part of the Kansai region), having 123 out of the 1,108 rail stations in the Osaka-Kobe-Kyoto region. As of 2025, the network transports approximately 2.5 million passengers daily, functioning as the primary urban transport backbone for Osaka City and surrounding municipalities including Higashiosaka, Kadoma, Moriguchi, Sakai, Suita, and Yao.

Osaka Metro is the only subway system in Japan to be partially legally classified as a tram system (Transport in Keihanshin), whereas all other subway systems in Japan are legally classified as railways. Despite this, it has all the characteristics typical of a full-fledged metro system. Major routes within the network include the Midōsuji Line, which runs north–south beneath Midōsuji and is the busiest subway line in the system, carrying approximately 1.3 million passengers per day as of 2015. Other key corridors include the east–west Chūō Line, as well as the Tanimachi and Yotsubashi lines, which provide important links across Osaka's central commercial and residential areas.

The subway system is closely integrated with regional rail networks operated by JR West and private railway companies such as Hankyu and Keihan. Major interchange stations, including Umeda, Namba, and Tennōji, enable convenient transfers and support Osaka's function as a major economic center, offering direct and indirect access to Kansai International Airport and neighboring cities such as Kyoto and Kobe.

Following lessons learned from the 1995 Great Hanshin earthquake, the network has undergone extensive safety upgrades. These include the introduction of enhanced earthquake-resistant structures and the implementation of flood and tsunami countermeasures from 2014 onward. In addition, accessibility improvements, such as the installation of elevators at all stations and platform screen doors on selected lines, reflect an emphasis on passenger safety and universal access.

== History ==
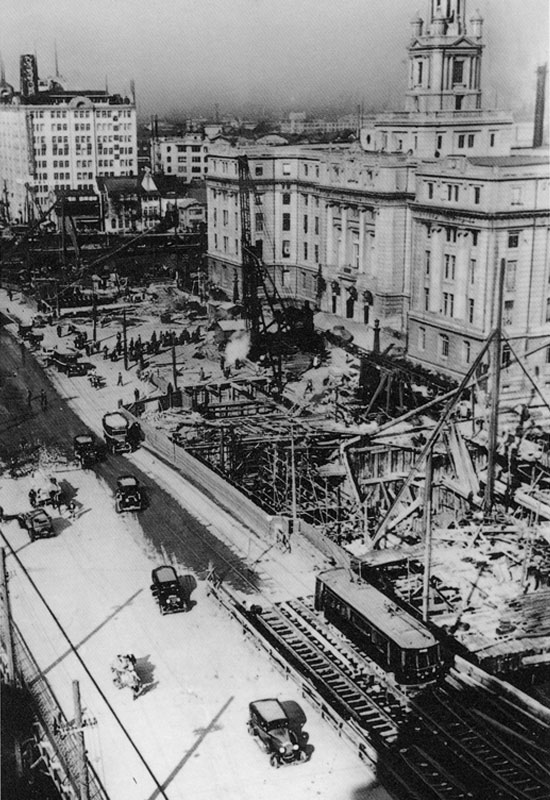
Excavation for the Midōsuji Subway Line on Midōsuji Avenue during the 1930s. The line opened in 1933.

In 1903, the Osaka Municipal Transportation Bureau began operating its municipal tram system between Hanazonobashi and Chikkō-Sambashi. As the city expanded, the streetcar network grew to provide service across most of Osaka, eventually reaching a total length of 118 km, making it one of Japan's largest tram systems, second only to the Tokyo Metropolitan Tram.

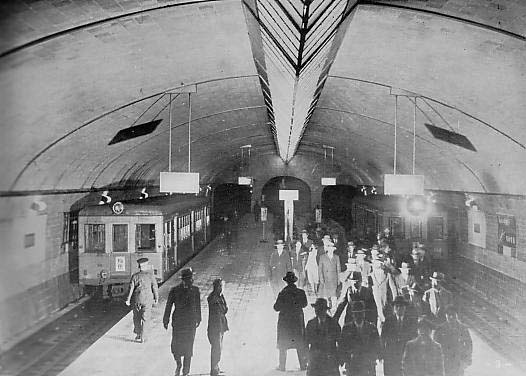
Midosuji Line in the 1930s.

The First World War prompted rapid growth in Osaka's commerce and industry. However, existing transportation systems primarily streetcars and the municipal bus network proved insufficient to meet rising demand. In response, Osaka City formulated a plan in 1925 for a subway network consisting of four lines totaling 54.5 km. Because construction commenced during the Great Depression and the Shōwa financial crisis, the city government deliberately adopted labor-intensive policies as an economic countermeasure, prioritizing the employment of large numbers of unemployed workers in order to alleviate joblessness and stimulate the economy. As part of this plan, Japan's first publicly operated subway line, Line 1 (now the Midōsuji Line), opened in May 1933, initially operating between Umeda and Shinsaibashi.

As a north–south trunk route, it is the oldest and busiest line in the whole network. Both it and the main east–west route, the Chūō Line, were later extended to the north and east respectively. These extensions are owned by other railway companies, but both Osaka Metro and these private operators run their own set of trains through between the two sections.

Subway construction was temporarily halted during World War II but resumed vigorously in the postwar period. During the 1950s, transportation demand increased alongside intensified socio-economic activity, particularly as motorization accelerated. Under these circumstances, subway development was strongly promoted, resulting in the completion of a 64.2 km network of six lines forming a grid pattern across the city center by 1970, the year of the World Expo. Subsequent extensions to the outskirts of the city and into the surrounding prefecture continued, and by 1987 the network had expanded to a total length of 99.1 km.

In 1990, in conjunction with the International Garden and Greenery Exposition, Japan's first linear motor subway line, Line 7 (the Nagahori Tsurumi-ryokuchi Line), opened between Kyobashi and Tsurumi-ryokuchi, and was later extended into the city center.

In July 2005, the Osaka Port Transport System became the unified operator of the Cosmosquare–Osaka Port section of the Osaka Port Transport System.

In December 2006, the second linear motor subway line, Line 8 (the Imazatosuji Line), opened between Itakano and Imazato. This line connects with four existing subway lines, the Keihan Main Line, and the JR Gakkentoshi Line, significantly improving network connectivity. As a result, the Osaka Municipal Subway expanded to eight lines, with 129.9 km of track and 123 stations.

On April 1, 2018, the system was privatized as Osaka Municipal Subway Co., Ltd., commonly known as Osaka Metro Co., Ltd.

In January 2025, in preparation for the 2025 Osaka–Kansai Expo, the Osaka Port Transport System is scheduled to open the Hokko Technoport Line, a 3.2 km section between Cosmosquare and Yumeshima, and will operate passenger services as a Class II railway operator.

=== Today ===
All but one of the remaining lines of the network, including the Yotsubashi Line, Tanimachi Line, and Sennichimae Line, are completely independent lines with no through services. The lone exception is the Sakaisuji Line, which operates through trains to existing Hankyu Railway lines and is the only line to operate through services to existing railway lines that are not isolated from the national rail network (which is the case with the Midōsuji and Chūō lines). As such, it is not compatible with the rest of the lines.

Nearly all stations have a letter number combination, the letter identifying the line served by the station and the number indicating the relative location of the station on the line. For example, Higobashi Station on the Yotsubashi Line is also known as Y12. This combination is heard in bilingual Japanese-English automated next-station announcements on board all trains, which also provide information on local businesses near the station. Only Hankyu stations served by the Sakaisuji Line do not follow this convention.

== Lines ==
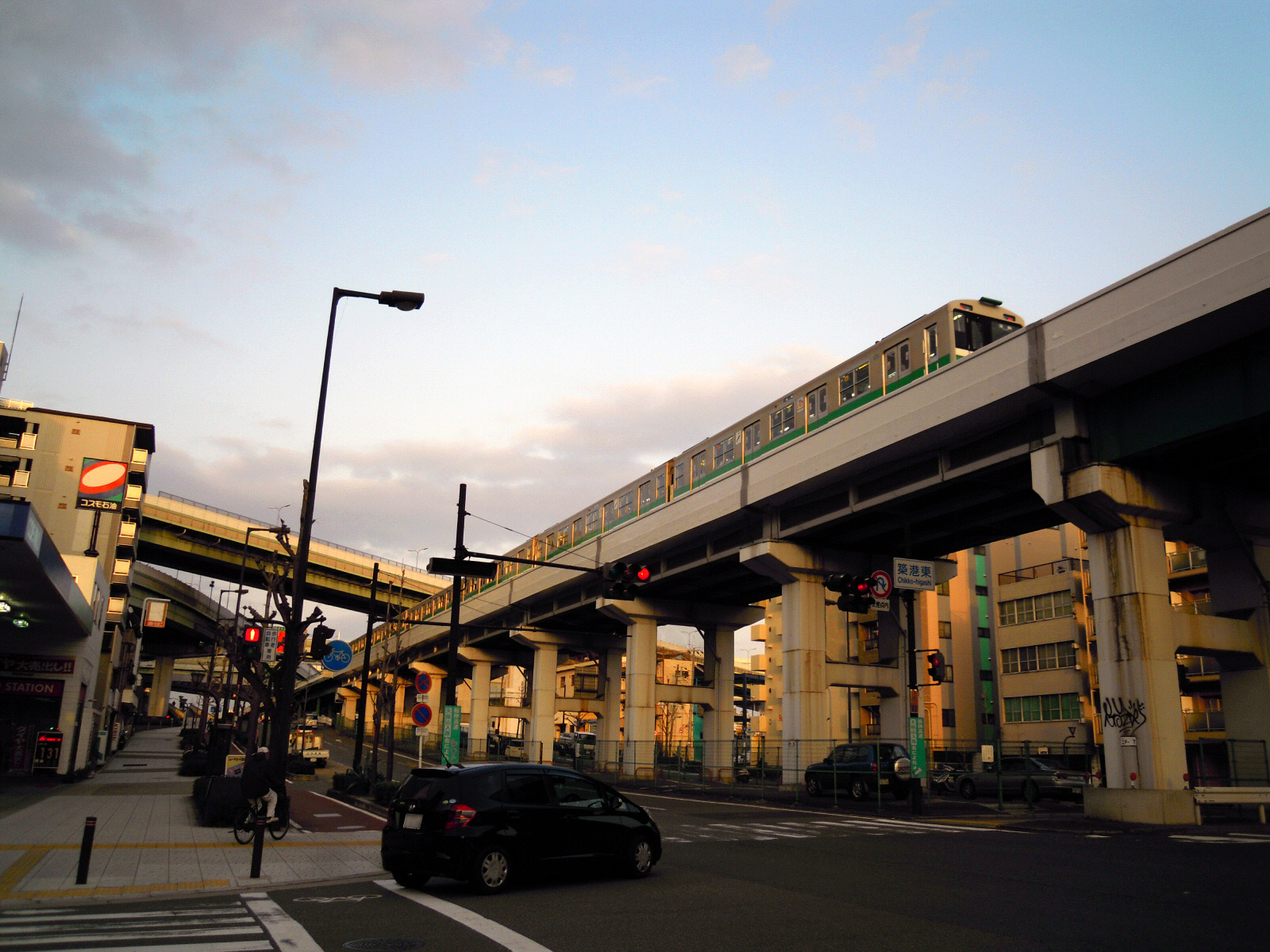
Chūō Line in Minato Ward.

Currently, there are eight lines, operating on 133.1 kilometers (82.7 mi) of track and serving 124 stations; there is also a 7.9-kilometer (4.9 mi)-long, 10-station automated guideway transit line known as the "New Tram".

The network is structured around several major interchange stations, including Umeda served by the Midōsuji, Tanimachi, and Yotsubashi lines and Namba, where the Midōsuji, Sennichimae, Sakaisuji, and Yotsubashi lines intersect. These hubs facilitate smooth transfers between subway routes as well as connections to external rail services.

To accommodate heavy demand, high-traffic routes such as the Midōsuji Line operate at short headways of approximately 2 to 5 minutes during peak periods. As a result, the system handled an average daily ridership of around 2.4 million passengers by late 2024, rising to approximately 2.52 million during the April–October 2025 Expo period.

| Name | Line color | Line icon | Line number | Japanese | Opened | Length | Stations | Train Length |
Rapid transit
| Midōsuji Line | Red | align="center" | Line 1 | 御堂筋線 | 1933 | 24.5 km (15.2 mi) | 20 | 10 cars |
| Yotsubashi Line | Blue | align="center" | Line 3 | 四つ橋線 | 1942 | 11.8 km (7.3 mi) | 11 | 6 cars |
| Chūō Line (Yumehanna) | Green | align="center" | Line 4 | 中央線 | 1961 | 21.1 km (13.1 mi) | 15 | 6 cars |
| Tanimachi Line | Purple | align="center" | Line 2 | 谷町線 | 1967 | 28.1 km (17.5 mi) | 26 | 6 cars |
| Sennichimae Line | Pink | align="center" | Line 5 | 千日前線 | 1969 | 12.6 km (7.8 mi) | 14 | 4 cars |
| Sakaisuji Line | Brown | align="center" | Line 6 | 堺筋線 | 1969 | 8.5 km (5.3 mi) | 10 | 8 cars |
| Nagahori Tsurumi-ryokuchi Line | Lime Green | align="center" | Line 7 | 長堀鶴見緑地線 | 1990 | 15.0 km (9.3 mi) | 17 | 4 cars |
| Imazatosuji Line | Orange | align="center" | Line 8 | 今里筋線 | 2006 | 11.9 km (7.4 mi) | 11 | 4 cars |
| Total: | | | | | | 133.1 km (82.7 mi) | 124 | |
Automated guideway transit
| Nankō Port Town Line | Light Blue | | New Tram | 南港ポートタウン線 | 1997 (Note: Owned by Osaka Port Transport System between Cosmosquare Station and Trade Center-mae Station) | 0.7 km (0.43 mi) | 1 (Note: Including Trade Center-mae Station) | 4 cars |
| Nankō Port Town Line | Light Blue | | New Tram | 南港ポートタウン線 | 1981 (Note: Between Trade Center-mae Station and Suminoekoen Station) | 7.2 km (4.5 mi) | 9 | 4 cars |
| Total (Subway, incl. AGT): | | | | | | 141 km (88 mi) | 134 | |

Table notes

=== Through services to other lines ===
A notable operational characteristic of the system is the provision of through-services with private railway operators. For example, Kintetsu Railway trains operate via the Chūō Line and continue beyond the subway network toward destinations in Nara and Kyoto, allowing passengers to travel across networks without the need for transfers.

| Name | Line color | Line icon | Japanese | Opened | Length | Stations | Train Length |
|---|---|---|---|---|---|---|---|
| Kitakyū Namboku Line | Red | align="center" | 北大阪急行電鉄 | 1970 | 8.4 km (5.2 mi) | 6 (Note: Including Esaka Station) | 10 cars |
| Keihanna Line (Yumehanna) | Green | C | 近鉄けいはんな線 | 1986 | 18.8 km (11.7 mi) | 8 (Note: Including Nagata Station) | 6 cars |
| Hankyu Senri Line | Brown | align="center" | 阪急千里線 | 1969 | 13.6 km (8.5 mi) | 11 (Note: Including Tenjimbashisuji Rokuchōme Station) | 8 cars (Note: All through trains onto the Sakaisuji Line are 8 car trains. Trains on the Hankyu lines terminating at Hankyu Umeda can be 7 or 8 cars.) |
| Hankyu Kyoto Main Line | Brown | align="center" | 阪急京都本線 | 1969 | 41.1 km (25.5 mi) | 22 (Note: Including Awaji Station) | 8 cars |
| Total: | | | | | 81.9 km (50.9 mi) | 47 | |

Table notes

=== Planned line and extensions ===
In addition, there are five line extensions and one entirely new line that are planned. However, on August 28, 2014, the Osaka Municipal Transportation Bureau met about creating the extensions of the later five of the six lines listed below, and have stated considering the current cost of the new extensions (and the possibly of privatization at the time), the government has also considered using light rail transit or bus rapid transit instead. Osaka Metro is now experimenting with bus rapid transit on the route of the Imazatosuji Line extension, with "Imazato Liner" service between Imazato and Yuzato-Rokuchōme slated to begin in April 2019.

With Osaka being the host of Expo 2025, a northwest extension to Yumeshima (the event's planned site) opened on 19 January 2025, with long-term plans envisioning a further extension to Sakurajima north of Universal Studios Japan via Maishima Sports Island. Provisions were put in place for such an extension when the Yumesaki Tunnel between Cosmosquare and Yumeshima was built in the late-2000s, but the then-state of the artificial island at the time of the bid (with only industrial facilities and a single convenience store for the workers) meant it would have been unlikely to proceed had Osaka not won said bid.

| Line color | Line icon | Line number | Name | Start | Terminus | Length |
|---|---|---|---|---|---|---|
| Blue | align="center" | Line 3 | Yotsubashi Line | Nishi-Umeda | Jūsō, later towards Shin-Ōsaka | 2.9 km (1.8 mi) (to Jūsō) |
| Green | align="center" | Line 4 | Chūō Line | Yumeshima | Sakurajima | (TBD) |
| Green | align="center" | Line 4 | Chūō Line | Morinomiya | Morinomiya Depot | 0.8 km (0.50 mi) |
| Pink | align="center" | Line 5 | Sennichimae Line | Minami-Tatsumi | towards Mito | (TBD) |
| Lime Green | align="center" | Line 7 | Nagahori Tsurumi-ryokuchi Line | Taishō | Tsurumachi Yonchōme (vicinity) | 5.5 km (3.4 mi) |
| Orange | align="center" | Line 8 | Imazatosuji Line | Imazato | Yuzato Rokuchōme | 6.7 km (4.2 mi) |
| (TBD) | - | Line 9 | Shikitsu–Nagayoshi Line (provisional) | Suminoekōen | Kire-Uriwari | 6.9 km (4.3 mi) |

== Stations ==
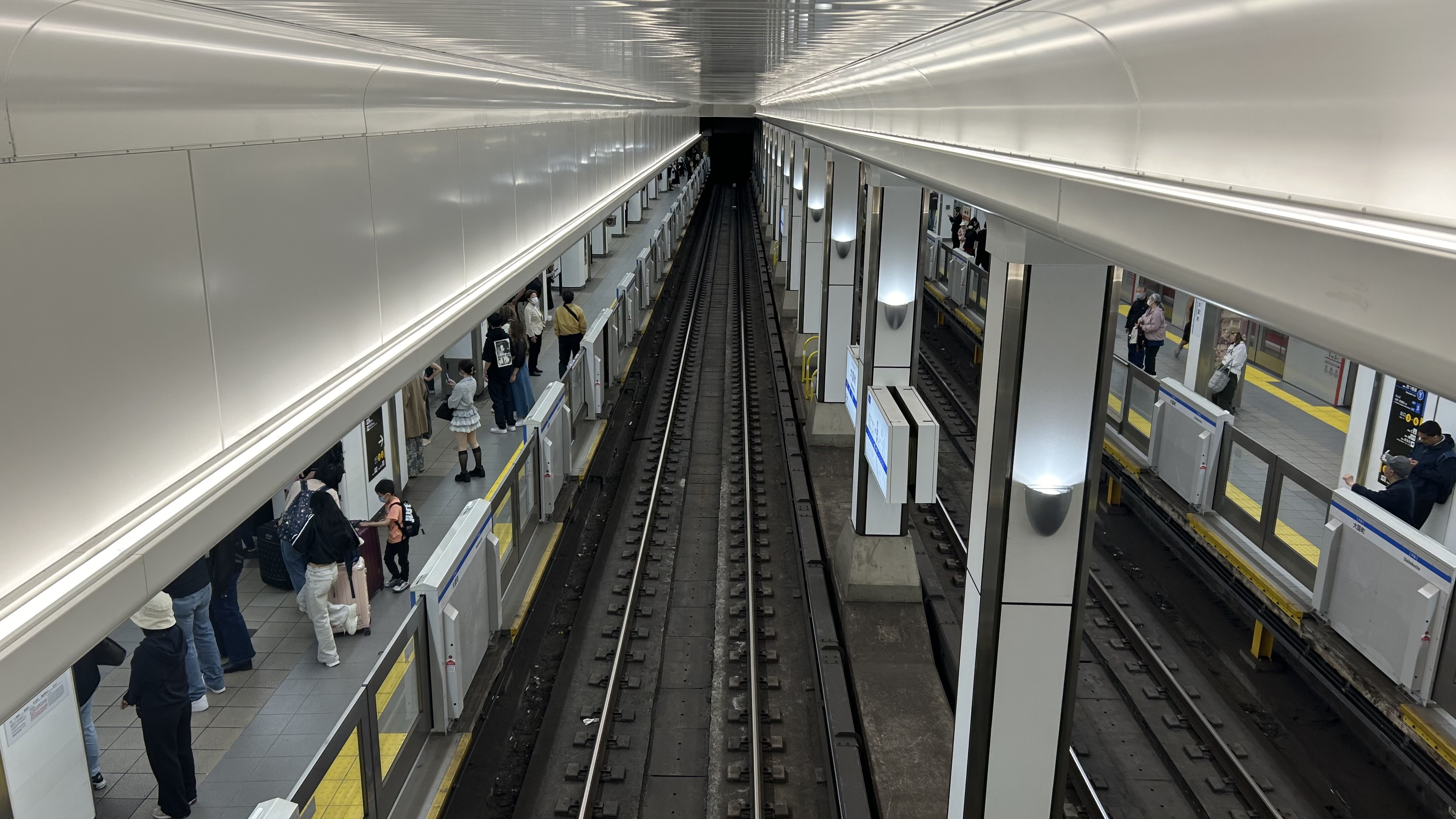
Daikokucho Station platforms

Universal accessibility forms a central component of Osaka Metro's station infrastructure. The operator achieved full compliance with Japan's Act on Promotion of Smooth Transportation without Causing Inconvenience to Persons with Disabilities by 2010, ensuring barrier-free access at all 134 stations. Each station provides at least one continuous wheelchair-accessible route ("one-route" access) from platform level to street level, supported by elevators and escalators. Additional accessibility features include tactile paving (braille blocks) for visually impaired passengers, Braille-equipped signage and route maps, wide automatic ticket gates suitable for wheelchairs and strollers, and multipurpose restrooms designed for users with mobility needs. Priority seating areas, nursing rooms, and rest facilities further enhance usability for elderly passengers and families with children.

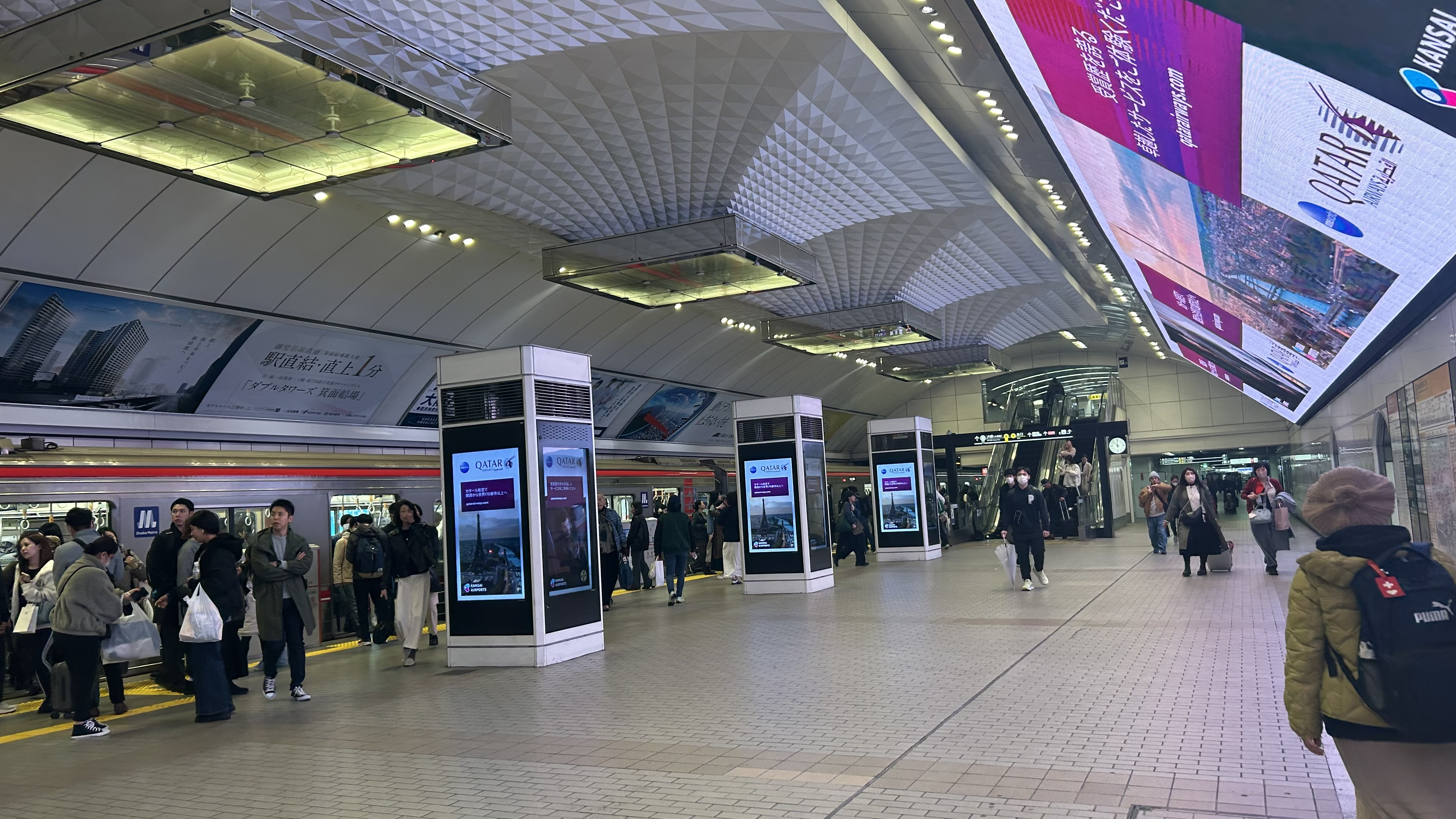
Underground LED screens at Umeda Station.

Ongoing modernization initiatives place strong emphasis on passenger comfort, information accessibility, and environmental sustainability. Energy-efficient LED lighting has been progressively installed throughout stations and tunnels, including on newer infrastructure such as the Chūō Line extension to Yumeshima Station, which opened in 2025. Passenger information systems have been upgraded with large-scale digital displays offering real-time train data and wayfinding support; notable examples include one of Japan's largest underground LED screens at Umeda Station and multi-screen platform installations at Hommachi Station. Platform screen doors have been introduced at more than 90 percent of stations, improving passenger safety while contributing to smoother crowd distribution. Additional crowd management measures include extensive CCTV monitoring and advanced ticket gate systems. Contactless entry technologies, including facial recognition systems first trialed in 2023, were deployed at approximately 130 stations by March 2025 to improve throughput during peak periods and reduce physical contact.

== Rolling stock ==
Osaka Municipal Subway rolling stock use two types of propulsion systems. The vast majority of lines use trains with conventional electric motors, but the two newest lines, the Nagahori Tsurumi-ryokuchi Line and Imazatosuji Line, use linear motor-powered trains, which allow them to use smaller trains and tunnels, reducing construction costs. These two lines have half-height automatic platform gates installed at all station platforms, as does the Sennichimae Line, the Midōsuji Line, and the Sakaisuji Line.

Also, unlike most other rapid transit networks in Japan (but like the preceding Ginza Line in Tokyo [the only rapid transit line in Asia at the time], and the subsequent Marunouchi Line in Tokyo, the early lines in Nagoya and the Blue Line in Yokohama), most Osaka subway lines use a third rail electrification system for trains. Only three lines use overhead catenary: the Sakaisuji Line, to accommodate through services on Hankyu trackage; and the linear-motor Nagahori Tsurumi-ryokuchi and Imazatosuji Lines. Also unusually, all lines use standard gauge; there are no narrow gauge sections of track due to the network being almost entirely self-enclosed (although Kyoto and Kobe also have entirely standard gauge metros with through services to private railways).

Osaka Metro's conventional rolling stock consists mainly of electric multiple units (EMUs) powered by rotary traction motors, which are used on most lines other than those equipped with linear induction motor systems. These trains operate on 1,435 mm standard gauge track. Electrification varies by route: the majority of lines are supplied with 750 V DC via a third rail, while the Sakaisuji, Nagahori Tsurumi-ryokuchi, and Imazatosuji lines use 1,500 V DC overhead catenary, enabling through-running with interconnected railway networks. Depending on the train series, maximum operating speeds typically fall between 70 and 80 km/h, with per-car passenger capacities generally ranging from approximately 130 to 150.

| Series | Image | Note |
|---|---|---|
| New 20 series | | 21 series – Midōsuji Line 22 series – Tanimachi Line 23 series – Yotsubashi Line 24 series – Chūō Line (later transferred to the Tanimachi and Yotsubashi lines and reclassified as the 22 and 23 series) 25 series – Sennichimae Line Power supply: Third rail system |
| 66 series | | Operated on the Sakaisuji Line; overhead line system |
| 70 series | | Operated on the Nagahori Tsurumi-ryokuchi Line; overhead line, linear motor system |
| 80 series | | Operated on the Imazatosuji Line and Nagahori Tsurumi-ryokuchi Line; overhead line, linear motor system (image shows Imazatosuji Line) |
| 30000 series | | 31 series: Midōsuji Line 32 series: Tanimachi Line (image shows Midōsuji Line); third rail system |
| 30000A series | | Operated on the Chūō Line and Tanimachi Line (image shows Chūō Line); third rail system Service began on July 22, 2022. Ten six-car trainsets (60 cars) were introduced to provide additional capacity for the 2025 Osaka–Kansai Expo. Following the Expo, the trains are scheduled to be transferred to the Tanimachi Line. |
| 200 series | | AGT rolling stock used on the Nanko Port Town Line |
| 400 series | | Operated on the Chūō Line; third rail system Service began on June 25, 2023. The series was introduced to increase capacity ahead of the 2025 Osaka–Kansai Expo and to replace aging 20 and 24 series trains, which are being reassigned to other lines. |

=== Technology ===
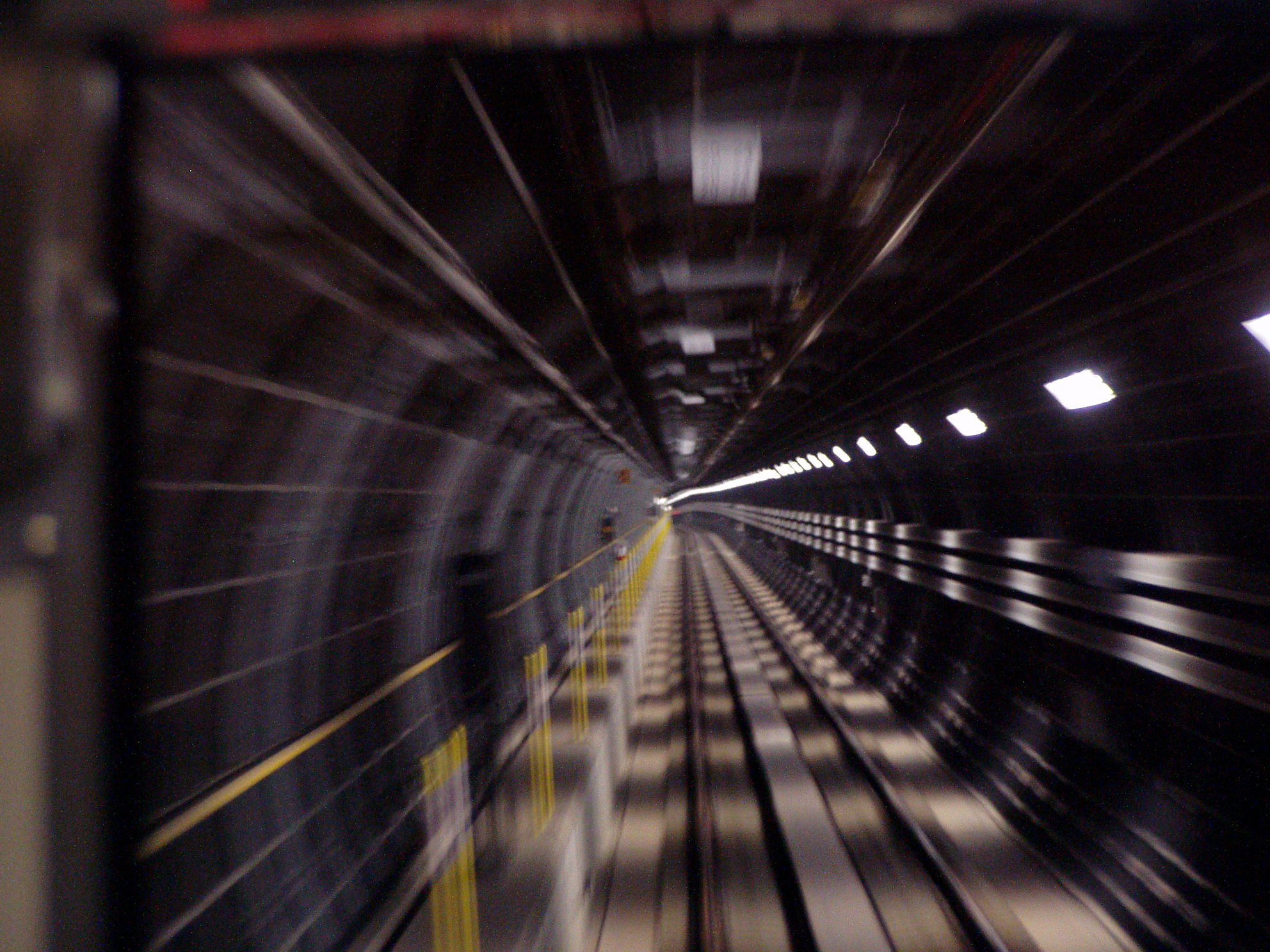
Nagahori Tsurumi-ryokuchi Line tunnel using linear induction motor (LIM) technology; small-diameter tunnel excavated with a tunnel boring machine

Osaka Metro employs linear induction motor (LIM) propulsion on two of its subway lines, a system that offers advantages such as smooth acceleration, precise speed control, and the ability to operate on steep gradients without the use of conventional mechanical transmissions.

The Nagahori Tsurumi-ryokuchi Line was Japan's first revenue-service subway line to adopt LIM technology. It is operated using 70 series rolling stock, which entered service in 1990. Trains run in four-car formations powered by a 1,500 V DC overhead catenary and are designed for a maximum operating speed of 70 km/h. Compared with traditional rotary-motor systems, the LIM configuration reduces noise and vibration, improving ride quality and environmental performance within urban tunnels.

LIM technology was later introduced on the Imazatosuji Line, which opened in 2006. This line uses 100 series trainsets, also formed as four-car units and supplied by a 1,500 V DC overhead system. The trains share similar performance characteristics with those on the Nagahori Tsurumi-ryokuchi Line, including a top speed of 70 km/h, along with the operational benefits of energy efficiency and enhanced traction control suited to dense urban alignments.

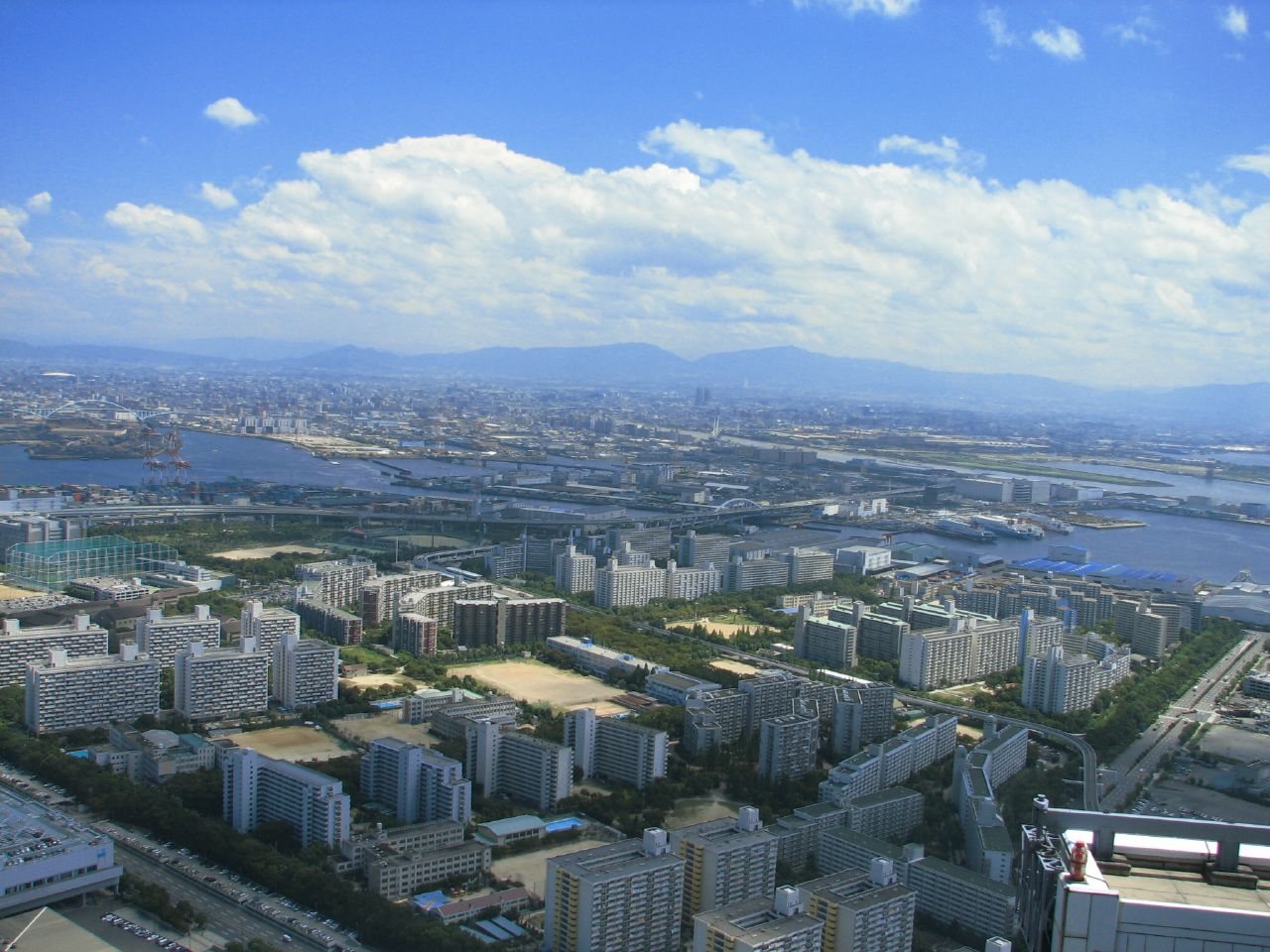
Port Town (view toward the southeast), with the "New Tram" viaduct visible

Beyond its use of linear induction motor technology, Osaka Metro also operates a fully automated transit system on the Nankō Port Town Line, commonly branded as the New Tram. The line has been driverless since opening in 1981, making it one of Japan's earliest automated guideway transit systems.The New Tram runs on a 7.9-kilometre elevated alignment and is equipped with rubber-tyred rolling stock. Services are operated using four-car trainsets of the 200 series, which draw power via a three-phase AC side-contact electrification system and are designed for a maximum operating speed of 60 km/h. As of recent years, the fleet comprises 20 trainsets, or 80 vehicles in total, optimized for dependable operation and reduced maintenance requirements under fully automated conditions. While the New Tram demonstrates the feasibility of unattended train operation within the Osaka Metro network, similar automation has not been implemented on the system's conventional subway lines as of 2025, which continue to rely on staffed operations.

== Fares ==
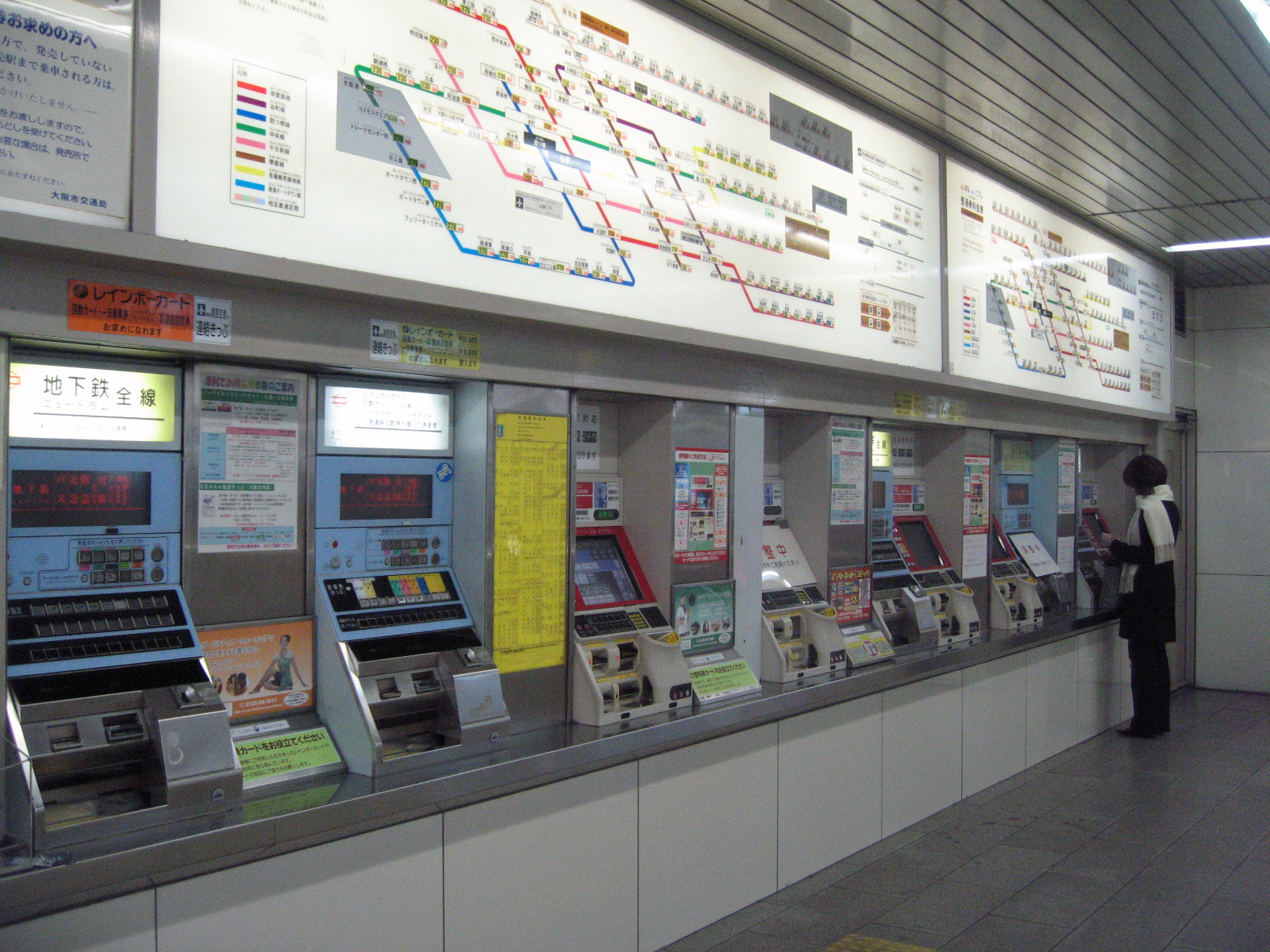
Ticket machines and fare maps at Shinsaibashi Station

Osaka Metro charges five types of fares for single rides, based on the distance traveled in each journey. Some discount fares exist.

Fare payment on the Osaka Metro is designed to prioritize ease of use and compatibility with Japan's wider public transport network. While single-journey paper tickets remain available from automated ticket machines at all stations, most passengers use contactless IC cards for their convenience. The ICOCA card, introduced in the early 2000s, offers tap-and-go access and can be recharged as needed; it requires a refundable ¥500 deposit.

ICOCA is fully interoperable with other major IC card systems, including Suica and PASMO, enabling seamless travel across JR lines, private railways, and metro systems nationwide. In addition to IC cards, Osaka Metro supports direct contactless payment at all ticket gates using credit, debit, or prepaid cards, as well as mobile wallets such as Apple Pay and Google Pay, eliminating the need for a dedicated transit card.

| Distance travelled | Rates (in yen) | |
| Distance travelled | Adult | Child |
|---|---|---|
| 1–3 km | ¥190 | ¥100 |
| 4–7 km | ¥240 | ¥120 |
| 8–13 km | ¥290 | ¥150 |
| 14–19 km | ¥340 | ¥170 |
| 20–25 km | ¥390 | ¥200 |

== Incidents ==
On April 8, 1970, a gas explosion occurred during an expansion of the Tanimachi Line at Tenjimbashisuji Rokuchōme Station, killing 79 people and injuring 420. The gas leaked out from a detached joint and filled the tunnel and exploded when a service vehicle's engine sparked over leaking gas, creating a fire column over 10 metres (33 ft) tall that burned around 30 buildings and damaged or destroyed a total of 495 buildings.

=== Safety ===
Since the 1990s, Osaka Metro has implemented automatic train control (ATC) systems throughout its network, providing continuous speed monitoring and automated braking to reduce the risk of collisions and overspeed incidents. The system enforces compliance with signal aspects and safe train separation, contributing to stable and reliable operations. In parallel, platform screen doors have been progressively installed at stations, creating a physical barrier between platforms and tracks to enhance passenger safety and improve boarding efficiency.

Safety management is further supported by comprehensive staff training programs. Employees participate in regular emergency preparedness exercises, including evacuation drills and simulated incident responses, often conducted in cooperation with municipal agencies. Osaka Metro also promotes passenger awareness through digital platforms, onboard and station announcements, and multilingual signage, encouraging safe behavior such as remaining behind platform markings and promptly alerting staff to irregular situations. Osaka Metro's safety framework places strong emphasis on preventive measures. Operating policies include strict controls on passenger density, with peak-period load factors maintained below 150 percent to limit discomfort and reduce stress on both passengers and infrastructure. In response to operational challenges that emerged in 2020, including those associated with the COVID-19 pandemic, the company also introduced dedicated mental health support initiatives for train operators, such as access to counseling services, stress-reduction training, and adjustments to work schedules aimed at reducing fatigue-related risks.

The effectiveness of these policies is reflected in Osaka Metro's comparatively low accident rate. Compliance with national railway safety requirements is regularly assessed through inspections and audits conducted by the Ministry of Land, Infrastructure, Transport and Tourism (MLIT), with findings used to inform continual updates to safety procedures and technical systems.

== See also ==
- Osaka Metro Co., Ltd.
- Transport in Keihanshin
- List of Osaka Metro stations
- List of metro systems
