= Osaka Castle Park =

Public urban park and historical site in Chūō-ku, Osaka

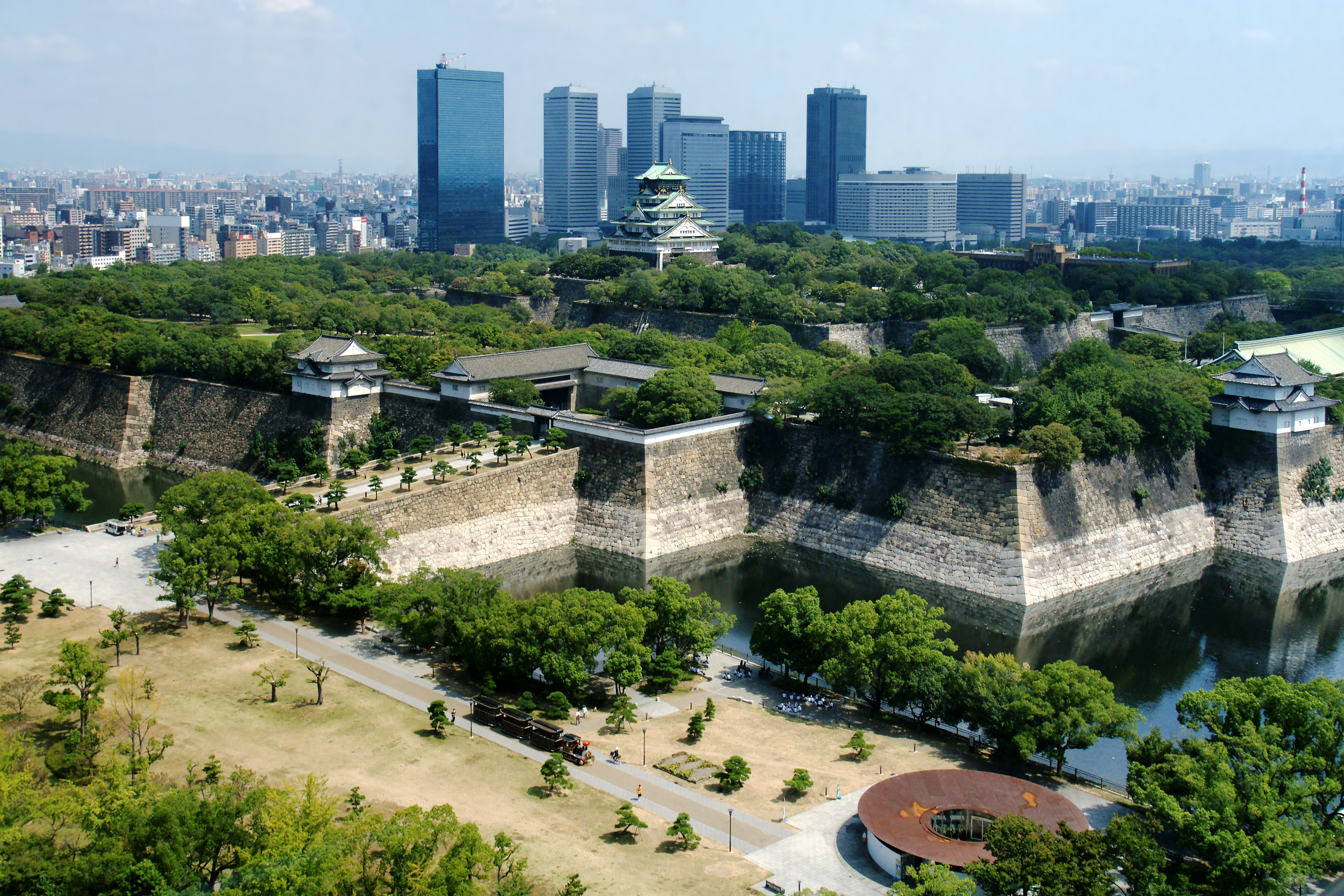
- Interactive map of Osaka Castle Park
- Type: Urban park
- Location: Chūō, Osaka
- Coordinates: 34.687378°N 135.525844°E
- Area: 105.6 hectares (261 acres)
- Created: 6 November 1931
- Operator: Osaka city
- Status: Open all year
- Parking: Morinomiya Parking; Jōnan Bus Parking

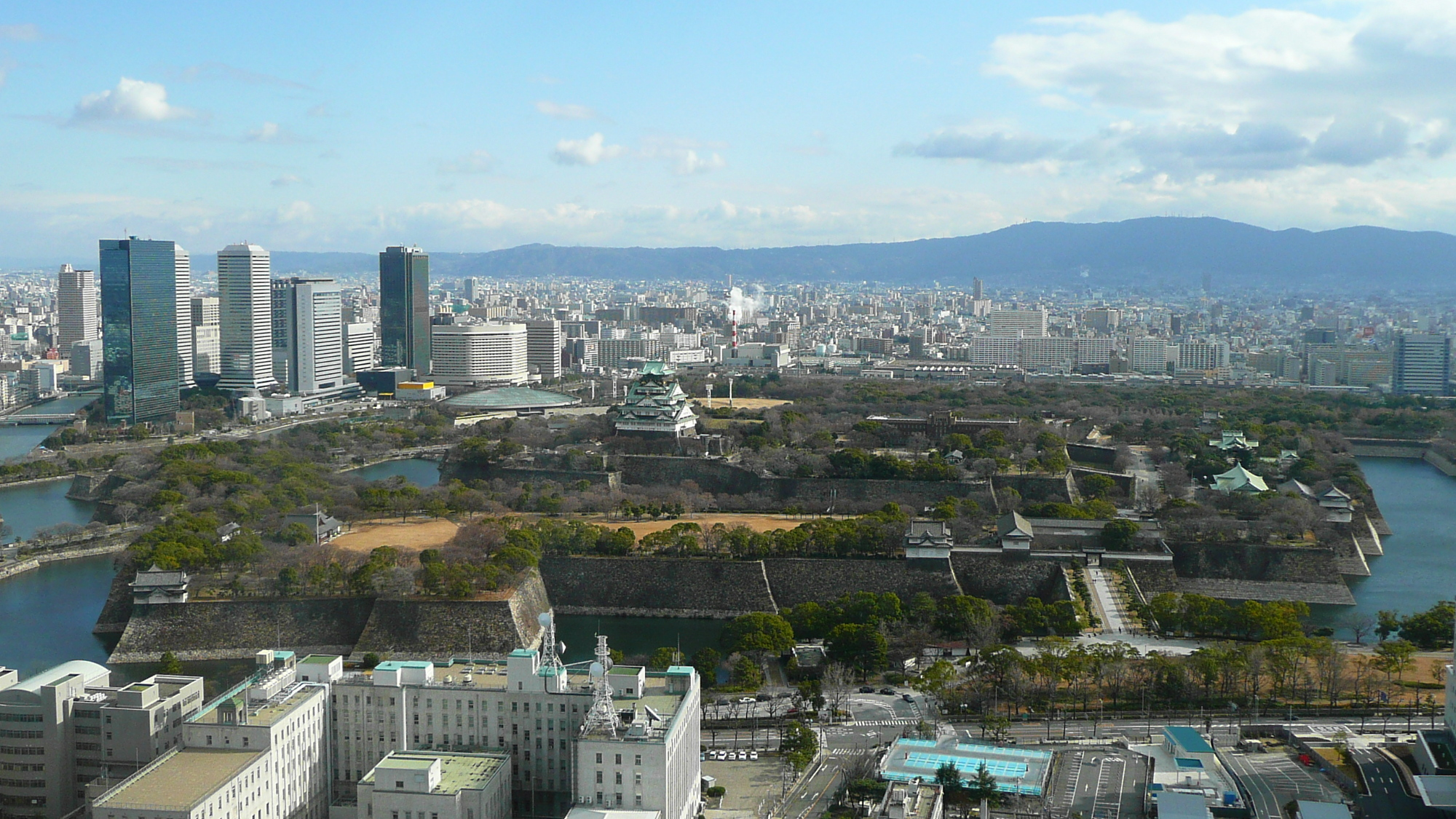
Osaka Castle Park from west

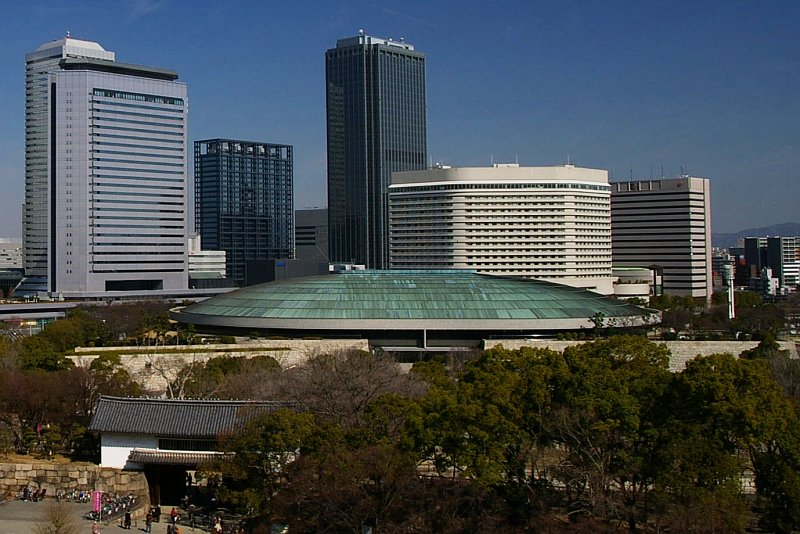
Osaka Castle Hall and OBP

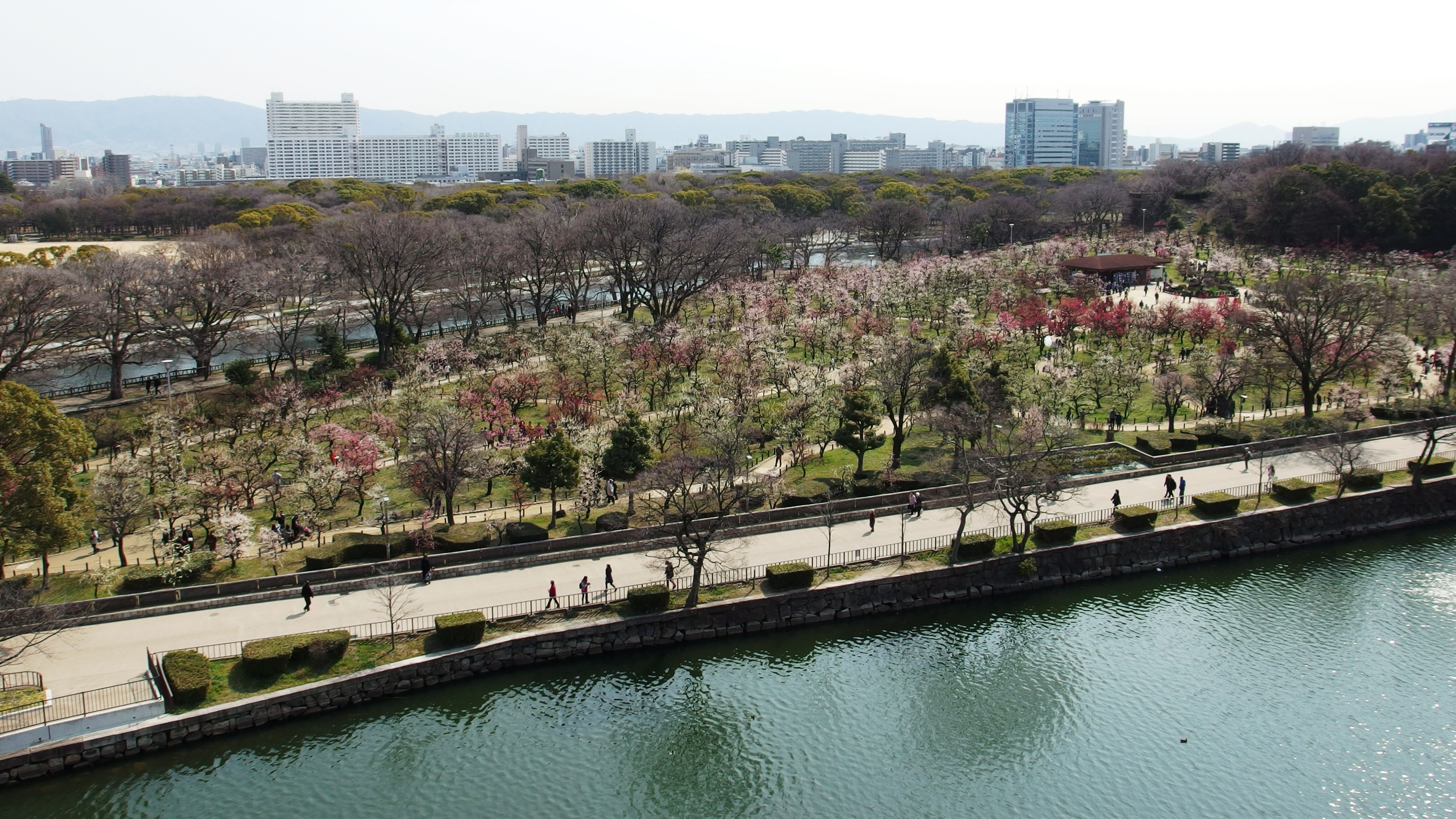
Plum garden

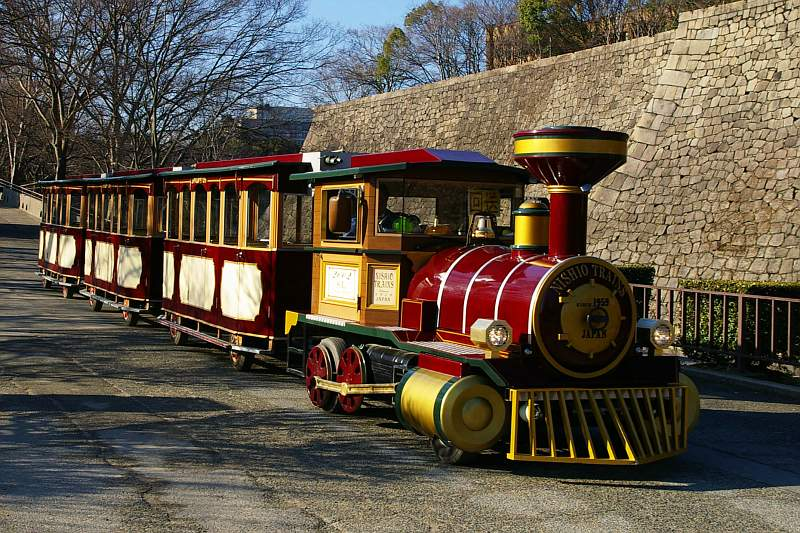
Road Train

Osaka Castle Park (大阪城公園, Osaka-Jō-Kōen) is a public urban park and historical site situated at Osaka-Jō in Chūō-ku, Osaka, Japan. It lies on the south of the Ōkawa (Kyū-Yodo River) and occupies a large area in the center of the city of Osaka. This park is the second largest park in the city.

The park was constructed on a site with a long history. In the fifteenth century, a militant temple, Ishiyama Hongan-ji, was built here. In 1583, Toyotomi Hideyoshi destroyed Ishiyama Hongan-ji and built Osaka Castle here. From 1870 to 1945 the Osaka Arsenal used a large area, and it was destroyed at end of World War II. In 1931, Osaka Castle Park was opened to the public, but most of the area was used by the Imperial Japanese Army. After World War II, most of the military complex was removed and replaced by the public urban park.

In the park, there is Osaka Castle Hall, a large athletic field, baseball field, football field, open-air music theatre, open-air concert hall, and Osaka Castle Keep Tower. From the top of keep tower, the vista includes Osaka Bay to Mount Ikoma, which surround the Osaka Plain. Many busking groups perform in the park. In spring, cherry blossom and plum blossom viewing is popular at this park.

== Facilities ==
=== Historical Monuments ===
- Osaka Castle (大坂城 Osaka-Jō)
  - Keep Tower (天守閣 Tenshu-kaku)
  - Gold Storehouse (金蔵 Kinzō)
  - Sakura Gate (桜門 Sakura-Mon)
  - Tamon Gate (多聞櫓 Tamon-Yagura)
  - Ōte Gate (大手門 Ōte-Mon)
  - Aoya Gate (青屋門 Aoya-Mon)
  - Inui Turret (乾櫓 Inui-Yagura)
  - Sengan Turret (千貫櫓 Sengan-Yagura)
  - 6th Turret (六番櫓 Rokuban-Yagura)
  - 1st Turret (一番櫓 Ichiban-Yagura)
  - Inner Moat (内濠 Uchibori)
  - Outer Moat (外濠 Sotobori)
- Ishiyama Hongan-ji monument (石山本願寺推定地碑)
- The pine tree where the priest Rennyo hung his surplice (蓮如上人袈裟懸の松 Rennyo-Shōnin Kesakake-no-Matsu)
- Monument where Toyotomi Hideyori and his mother Yodo-dono committed suicide(豊臣秀頼 淀殿ら自刃の碑)

=== Shrines and temples ===
- Hōkoku Shrine (豊國神社 also Toyokuni-jinja)
  - Stone Garden (秀石庭 Syuseki-Tei)
- Ikukunitama Shrine branch (生國魂神社お旅所 Ikukunitama-jinja Otabisho)
- 無縁仏回向供養塔

=== Cultural and sports facilities ===
- Osaka Castle Hall (大阪城ホール Osaka-jō Hall)
- Osaka Castle open-air concert hall (大阪城音楽堂 Osaka-jō Ongakudō)
- Martial art training centre (修道館 Shudo-Kan)
- Baseball field and Athletic field (太陽の広場 Taiyō-no-Hiroba)
- Japanese archery Kyudo training field (弓道場 Kyudō-Jō)
- Osaka International Peace Center (大阪国際平和センター Osaka Kokusai Heiwa Centre)
- There is a large and robust musical presence in the park, with many bands, buskers and musicians performing or practicing.

=== Public park facilities ===
- Nishi-no-Maru Garden (西ノ丸庭園 Nishi-no-Maru Teien)
  - Osaka Government Guest House (大阪迎賓館 Osaka Geihin-Kan)
  - Japanese Tea Room (豊松庵 Toyomatsu-An)
- Japanese Garden (日本庭園 Nihon-Teien)
- Plum Garden (梅林 Bairin)
- Peach garden (桃園 Momoen)
- Citizen's Forest (市民の森 Shimin-no-Mori)
- Memorial Forest (記念樹の森 Kinenju-no-Mori)
- Waseda Forest (早稲田の森 Waseda-no-Mori)
- Forest of Recollections (思い出の森 Omoide-no-Mori)
- Marked Stone Place (刻印石広場 Kokuin-Seki-Hiroba)
- Fountain

=== National Geological Survey facilities ===
- 2nd grade triangulation surveying point (二等三角点 大阪城)

=== Government facilities ===
- City Government, Eastern Area Park Facilities Maintenance Office
- City Water Company, Ōte-Mae Water Supply Facilities (大手前配水池,大手前配水場 高地区ポンプ場)

=== Imperial Japanese Army facilities ===
- Former Headquarters of 4th Division of Imperial Japanese Army
- Former Chemical laboratory building of Osaka Arsenal

=== Other ===
- Education Tower (教育塔 Kyoiku-Tou)
- 大阪社会運動顕彰塔
- Osaka Castle Port (大阪城港) for Osaka Suijō Bus

=== Parking ===
- Morinomiya Parking (森ノ宮駐車場)
- Jōnan Bus Parking (城南バス駐車場)

== Activities in the park ==
- plum blossom viewing : January–March
- peach blossom viewing : March
- cherry blossom viewing : April

== Access ==
Temmabashi Station, Tanimachi Yonchōme Station, Morinomiya Station and Ōsakajōkōen Station are near to the park.

== Photographs ==
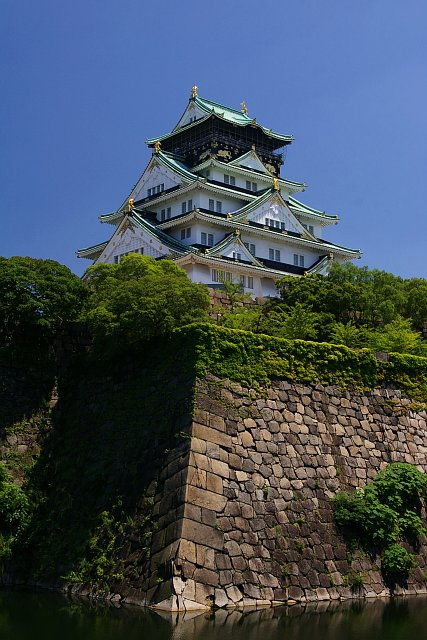
Keep Tower

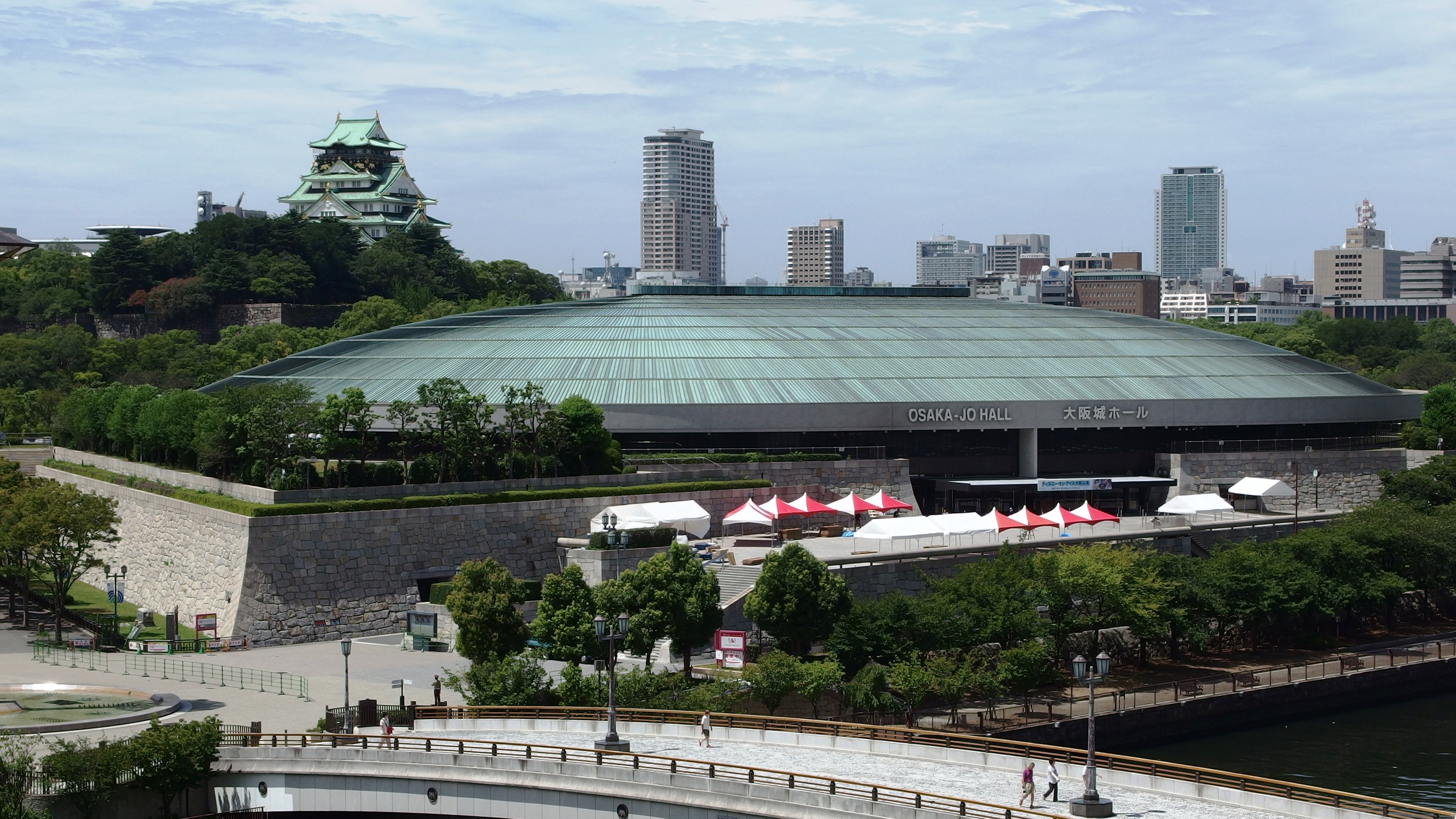
Osaka Castle Hall

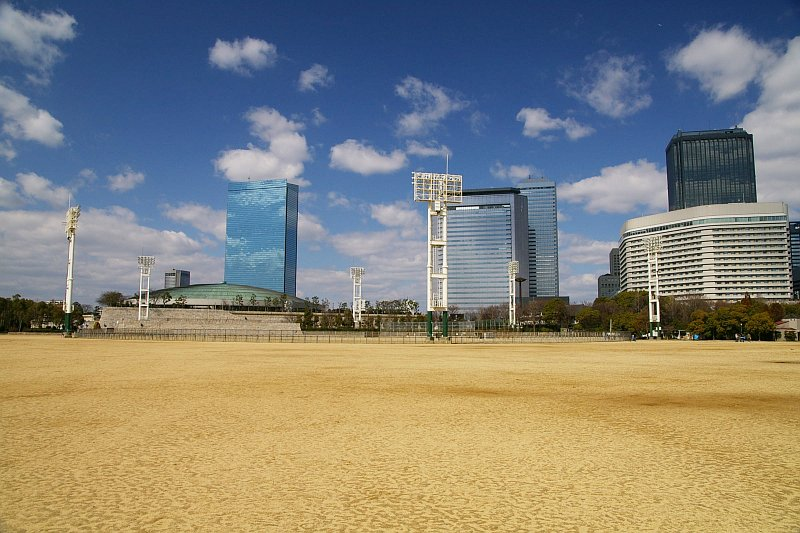
Athletic field

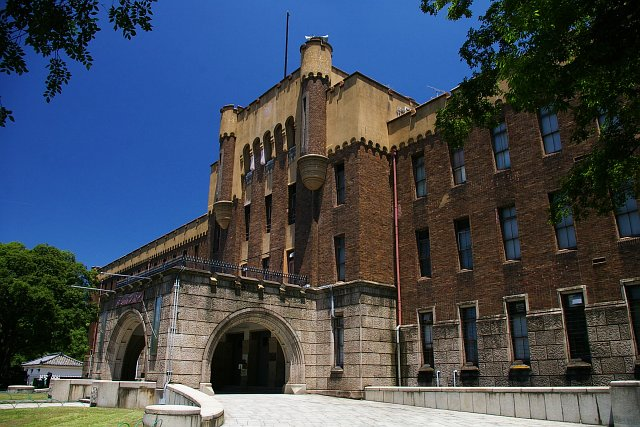
Former headquarters of 4th Division

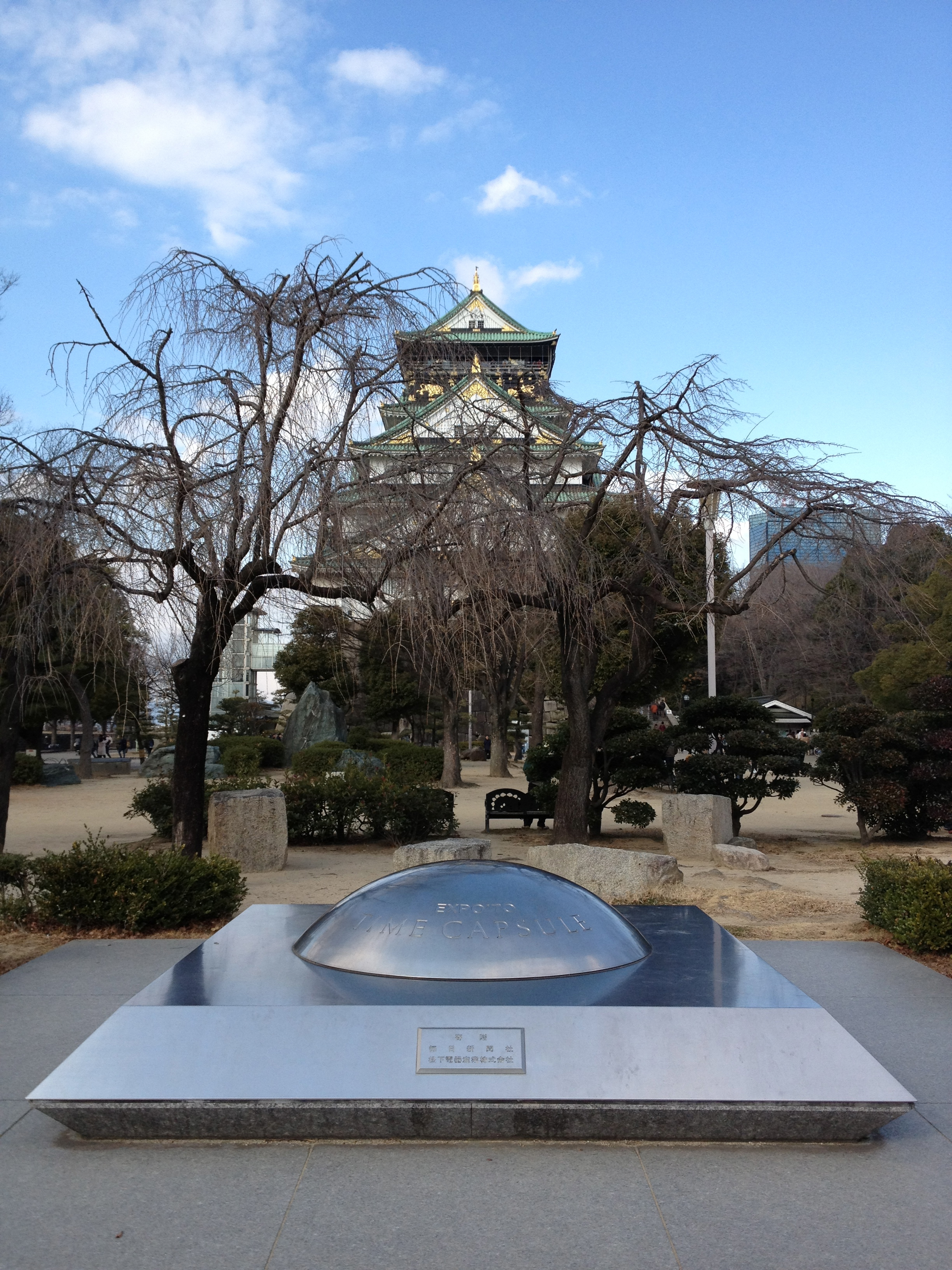
Time capsule to be open in year 6970

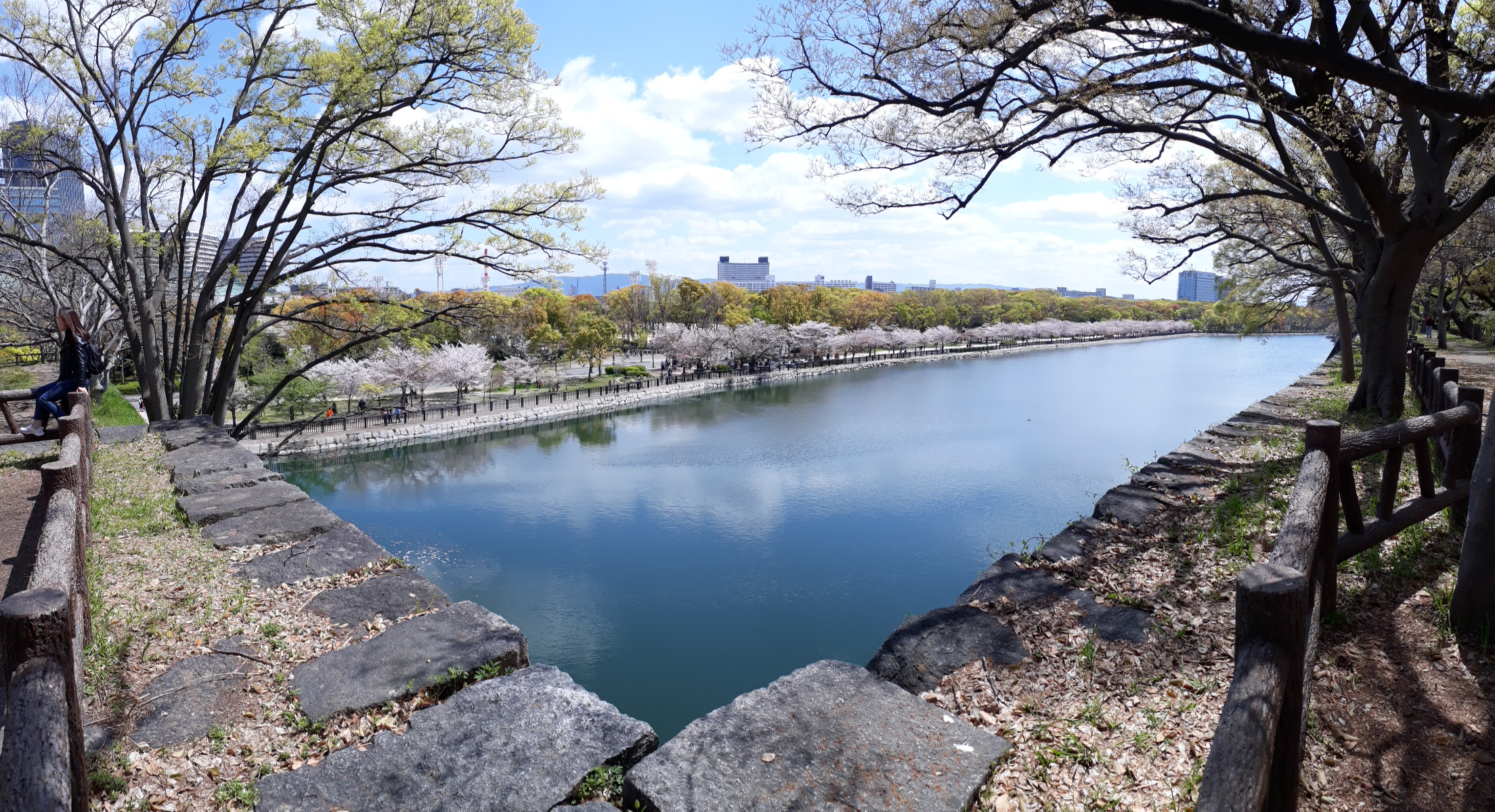
Panorama View of Osakajo-koen from atop Aoyamon Gate Ramparts.

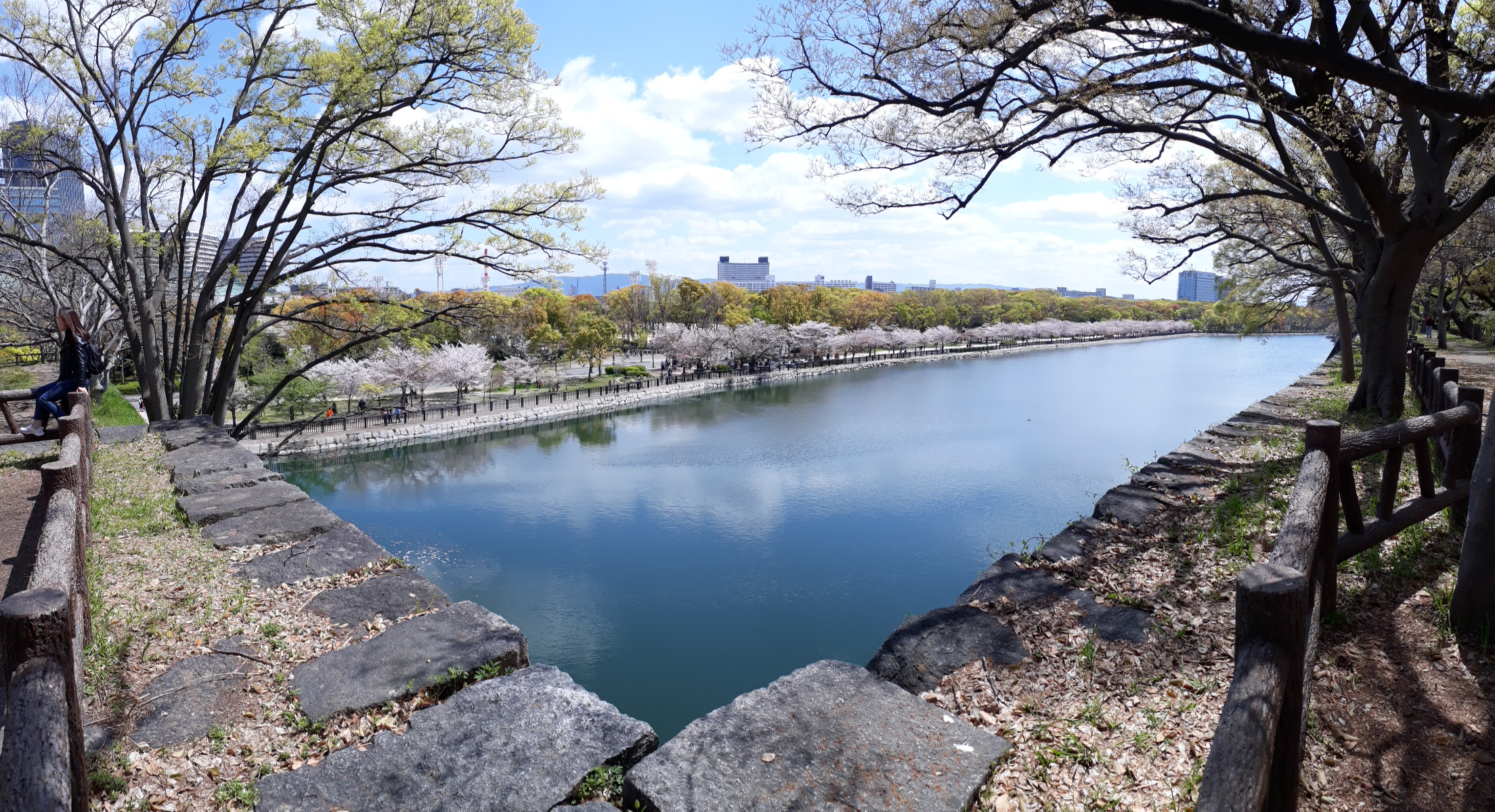
View of Osakajo-koen from atop Aoyamon Gate Ramparts.

== See also ==
- Osaka Castle
- The 100 Views of Nature in Kansai
