= Tanimachi Rokuchōme Station =

Metro station in Osaka, Japan

Coordinates: 34°40′29.7″N 135°31′1.05″E

Tanimachi Rokuchōme Station 谷町六丁目駅
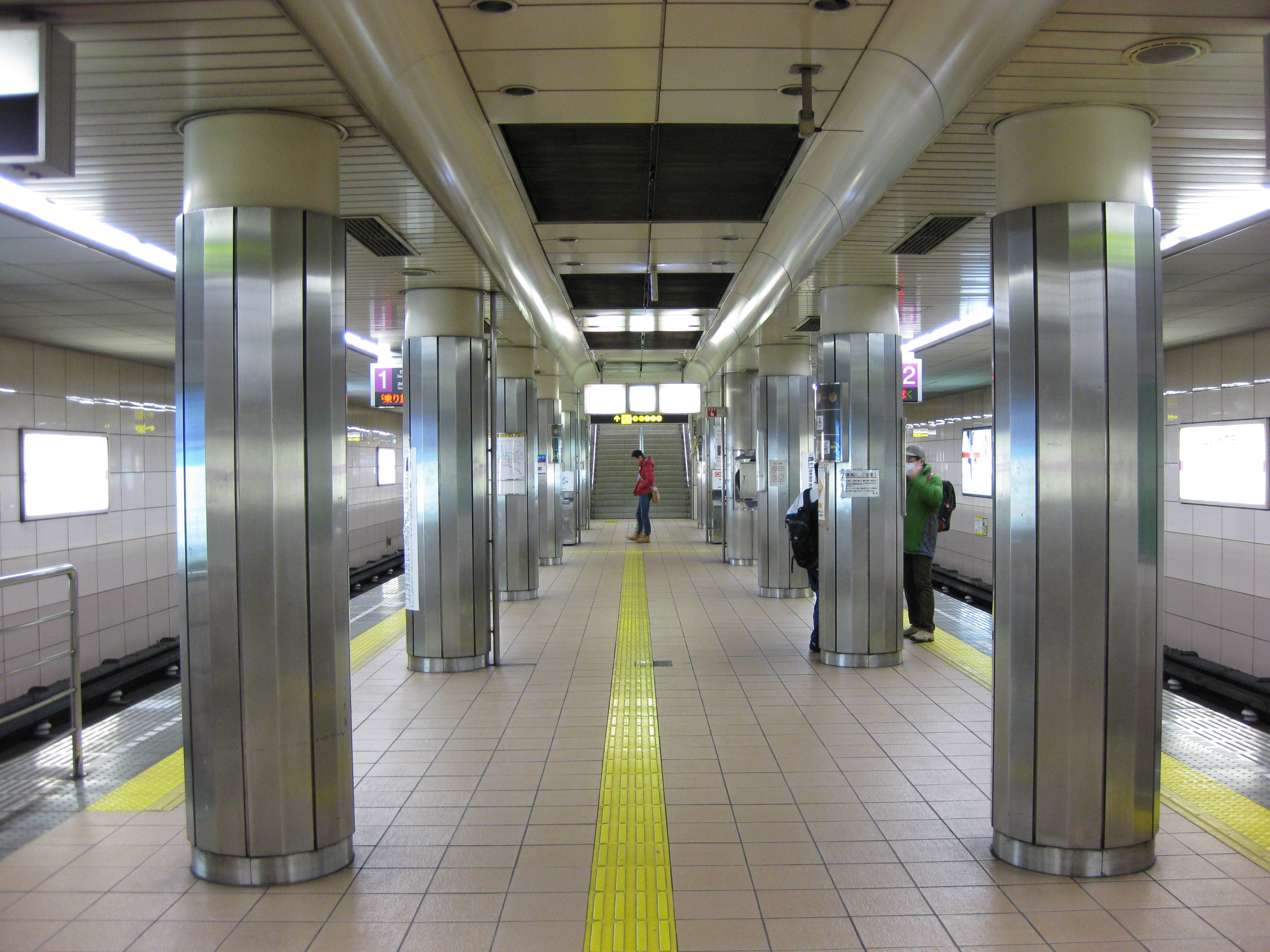
- Tanimachi Line platform

General information
- Location: Osaka; Japan
- System: Osaka Metro
- Operator: Osaka Metro
- Lines: Tanimachi Line; Nagahori Tsurumi-ryokuchi Line
- Platforms: 2 island platforms (1 for each line)
- Tracks: 2 (1 for each line)

Construction
- Structure type: Underground

Other information
- Station code: T 24 N 18

History
- Opened: 17 December 1968; 57 years ago

Services
Preceding station	Osaka Metro	Following station
Tanimachi Yonchōme T 23 towards Dainichi	Tanimachi Line	Tanimachi Kyūchōme T 25 towards Yaominami
Matsuyamachi N 17 towards Taishō	Nagahori Tsurumi-ryokuchi Line	Tamatsukuri N 19 towards Kadoma-minami
Location
- Location within Osaka Prefecture Location within Japan

Tanimachi Rokuchome Station (谷町六丁目駅, Tanimachi Rokuchōme-eki) is a metro station on the Osaka Metro in Chūō-ku, Osaka, Japan, and also called "Tani Roku (たにろく)".

== Lines ==
- Osaka Metro
  - Tanimachi Line (T24)
  - Nagahori Tsurumi-ryokuchi Line (N18)

== Layout ==
This station has an island platform with two tracks for each line, and the platform for the Nagahori Tsurumi-ryokuchi Line is fenced with platform gates. Ticket gates are located on upper level than the south and the center of the platform for the Tanimachi Line and on upper level than the center of the platform for the Nagahori Tsurumi-ryokuchi Line.

Tanimachi Line

1	■ Tanimachi Line	for Tennoji and Yaominami
2	■ Tanimachi Line	for Higashi-Umeda, Miyakojima and Dainichi

Nagahori Tsurumi-ryokuchi Line

1	■ Nagahori Tsurumi-ryokuchi Line	for Morinomiya, Kyobashi and Kadomaminami
2	■ Nagahori Tsurumi-ryokuchi Line	for Shinsaibashi and Taisho

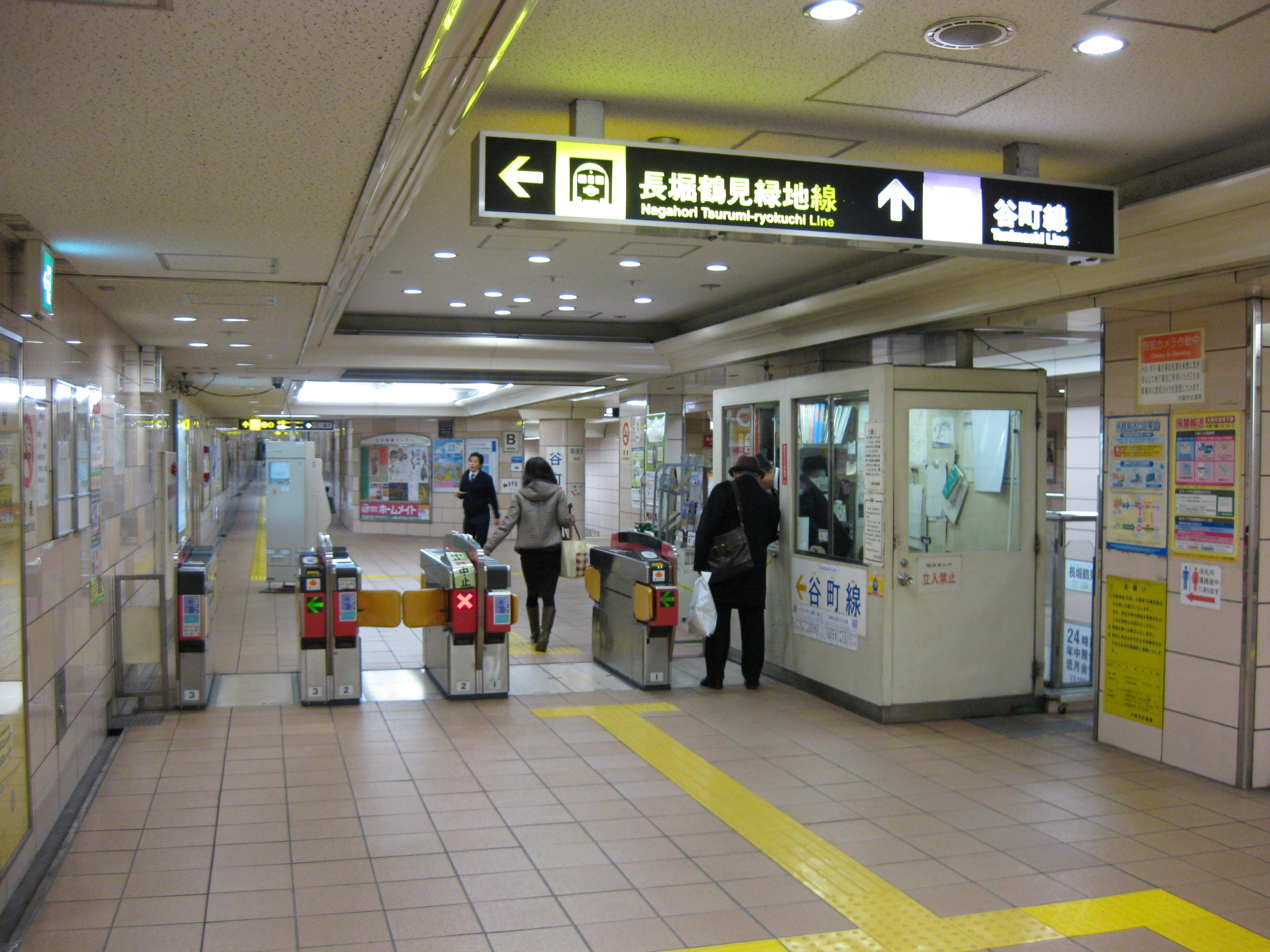
Tanimachi Line mezzanine

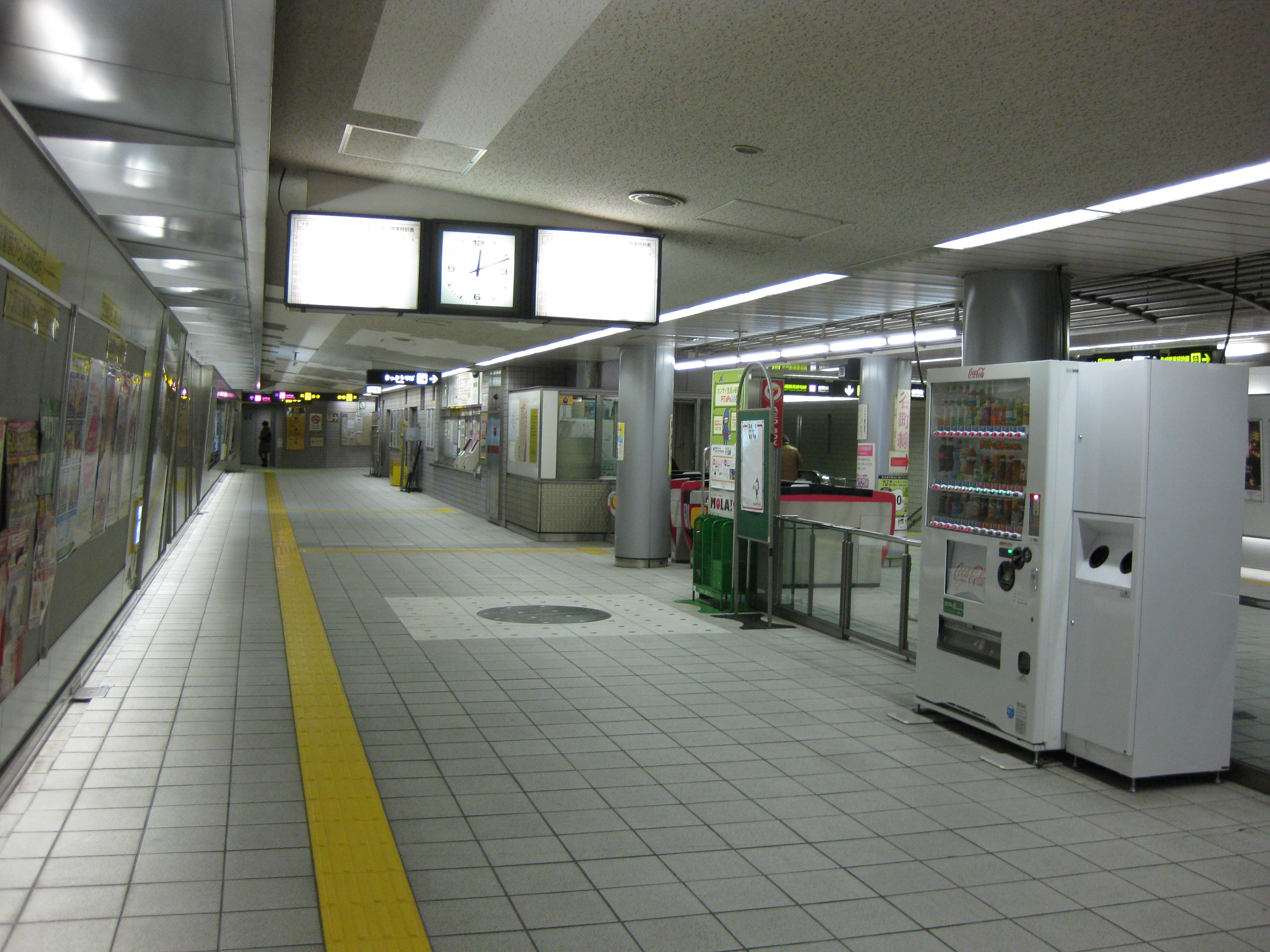
Nagahori Tsurumi-ryokuchi Line mezzanine

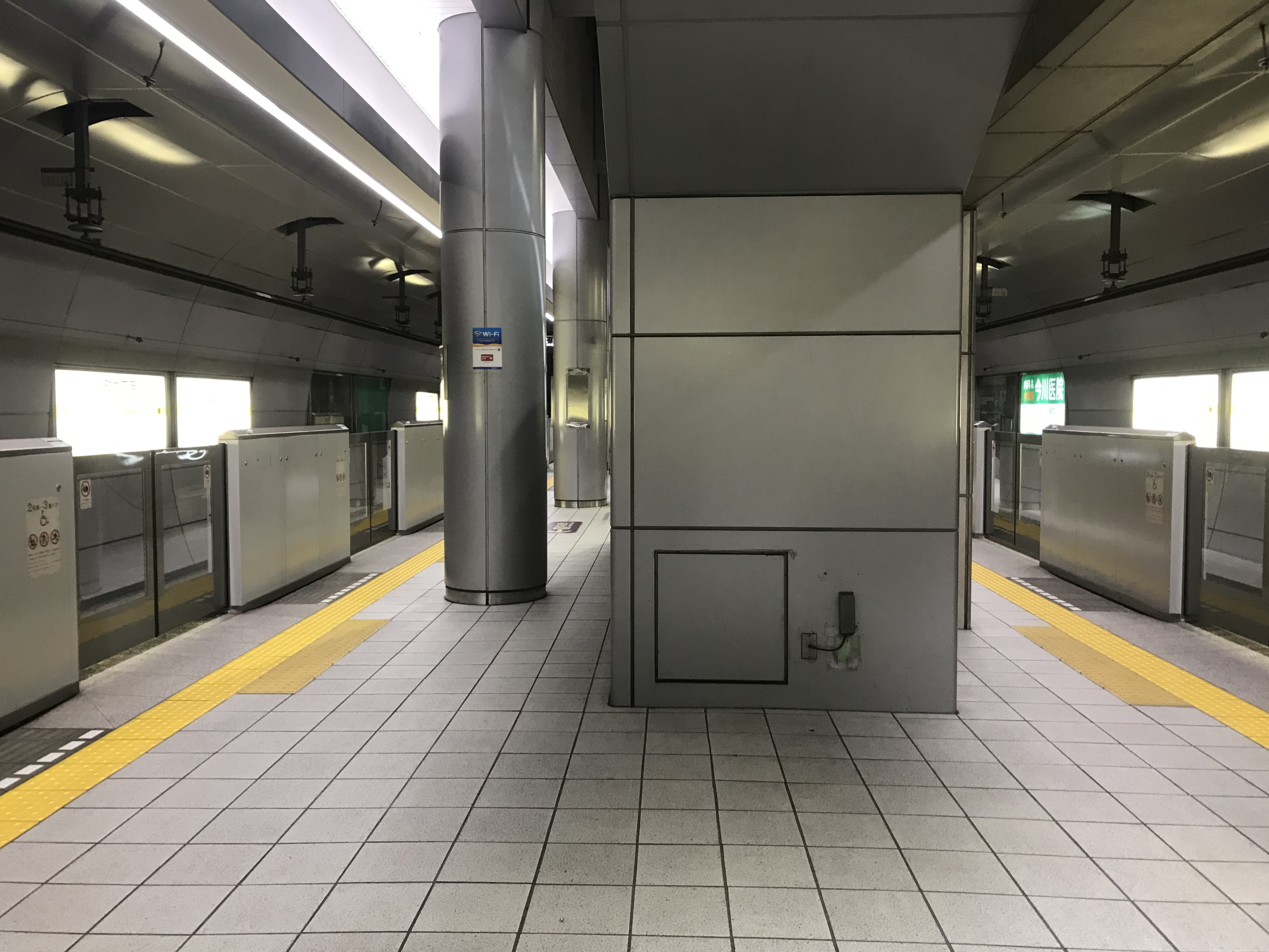
Nagahori Tsurumi-ryokuchi Line platform

== Surroundings ==
- the headquarters of Mandom Corporation
- the headquarters of SSK Corp.
- Karahori Shopping Arcade, the center of a town that did not get destroyed during the Bombing of Osaka.
- Osaka Prefectural Shimizudani High School
