= Ōsakajōkōen Station =

Railway station in Osaka, Japan

Ōsakajō-kōen Station 大阪城公園駅
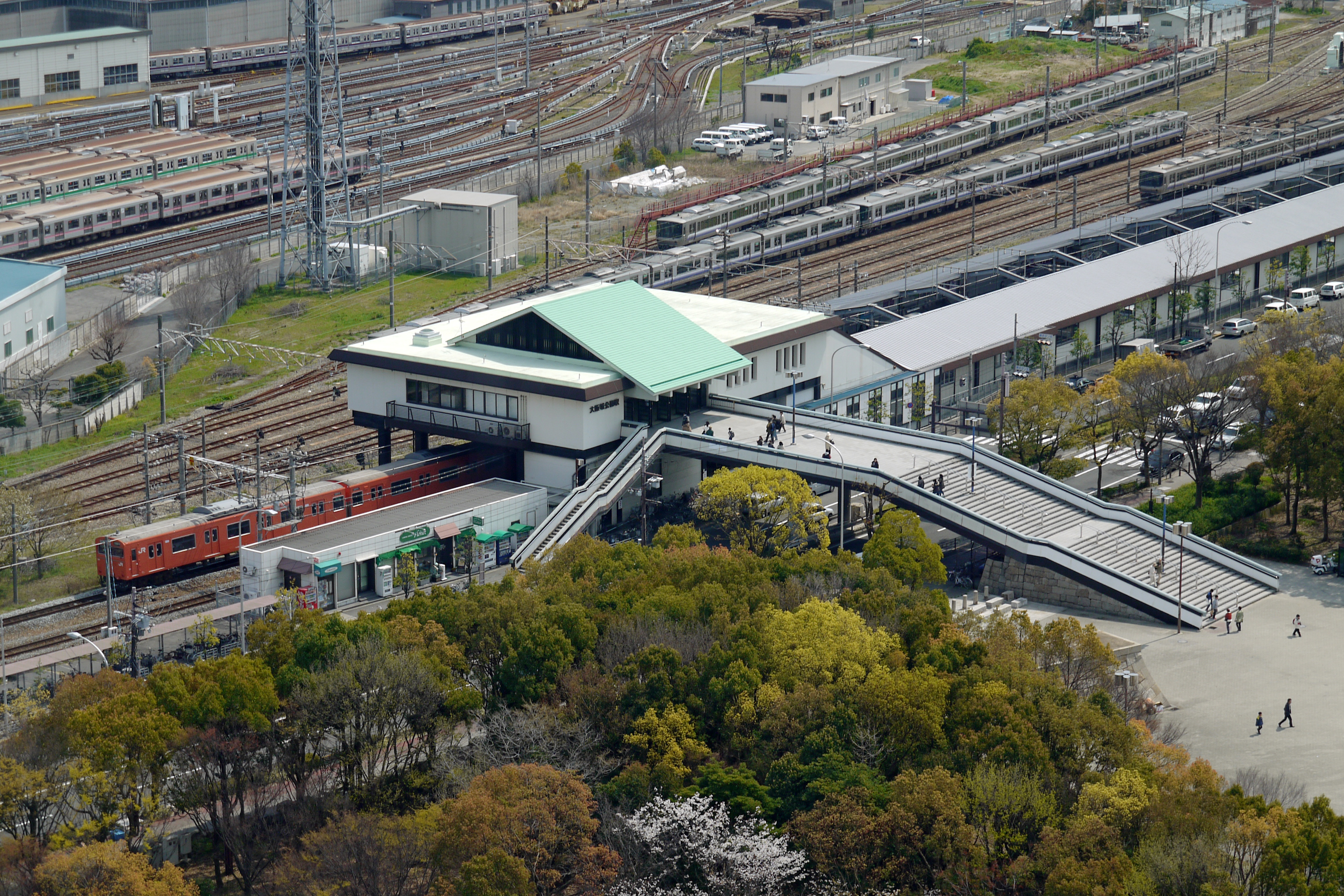
- Ōsakajō-kōen Station in 2011

General information
- Location: 4-11-21 Daidō, Tennōji-ku, Osaka-shi, Osaka-fu; Japan
- Coordinates: 34°41′18.88″N 135°32′04.13″E
- Operator: JR West
- Line: O Osaka Loop Line
- Platforms: 2 side platforms
- Tracks: 2
- Connections: Bus stop

Other information
- Station code: JR-O07
- Website: Official website

History
- Opened: 1 October 1983
Location
- Location within Japan

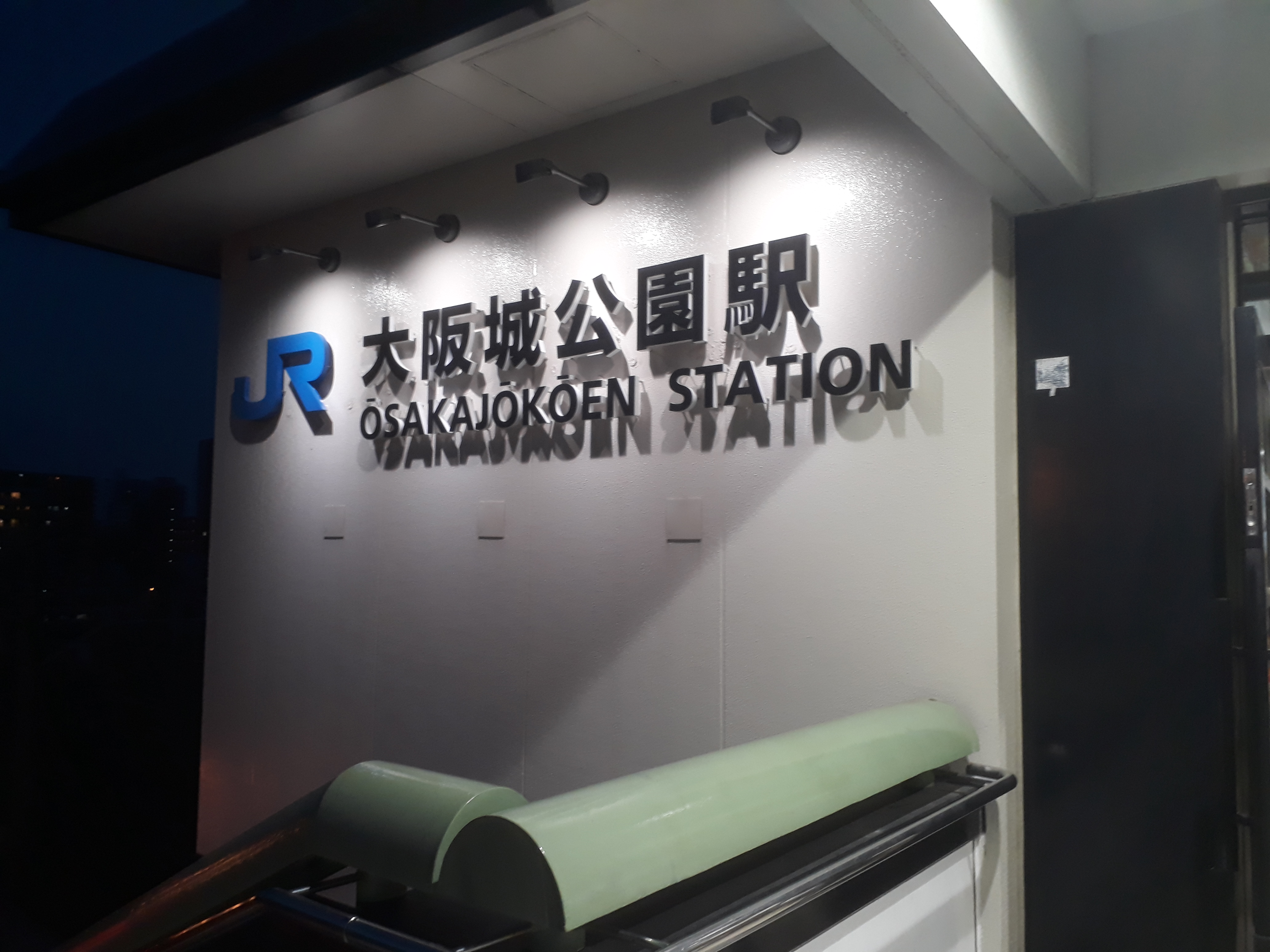
Osakajo-koen Station Sign (Located at entrance) at night.

Ōsakajō-kōen Station (大阪城公園駅, Ōsakajō-kōen-eki; lit. "Ōsaka Castle Park") is a railway station on the West Japan Railway Company (JR West) Osaka Loop Line in Jōtō-ku, Osaka, Japan. The station name translates as Osaka Castle Park.

The station was designed to reflect the architecture of Ōsakajō (Ōsaka Castle), for which the station gets its name. This could be seen in the black and white coloured contrast of the walls, and the green-coloured roofs (representing the iconic colour of corroded copper roofs that Ōsakajō is well known for having).

== Layout ==
There are two side platforms with two tracks on the ground level.

1	■ Osaka Loop Line	inner track for Kyōbashi and Osaka
2	■ Osaka Loop Line	outer track for Tsuruhashi and Tennōji

== Surrounding area ==
- Osaka Castle
- Osaka-jo Hall
- Osaka Business Park
- Osaka Suijō Bus Ōsakajō Pier

== Adjacent stations ==
«	Service	»
West Japan Railway Company (JR West) Osaka Loop Line
Morinomiya	All types	Kyōbashi

== History ==
Ōsakajō-kōen Station opened on 1 October 1983.

Station numbering was introduced in March 2018 with Ōsakajō-kōen being assigned station number JR-O07.
