= Tamatsukuri Station =

Railway station in Osaka, Japan

Coordinates: 34°40′25″N 135°31′58″E

Tamatsukuri Station 玉造駅
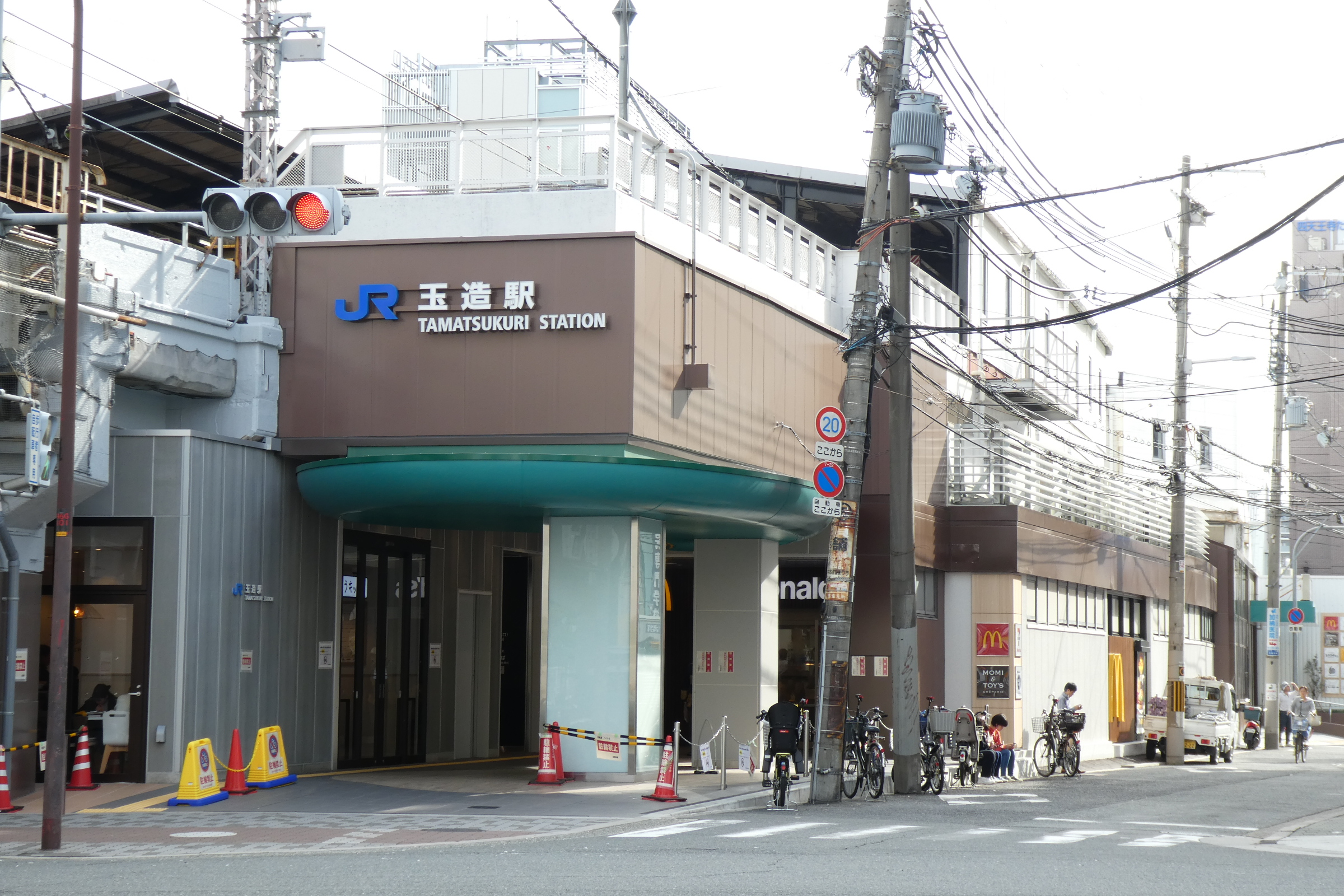
- North entrance of the JR station

General information
- Location: Osaka; Japan
- Operator: JR West; Osaka Metro
- Lines: Osaka Loop Line; Nagahori Tsurumi-ryokuchi Line

Construction
- Structure type: Elevated (Loop line); Underground (Metro)

Other information
- Station code: JR-O05 (JR West); N 19

History
- Opened: 1895 (JR West station); 11 December 1996 (subway station)

Services
Preceding station	Osaka Metro	Following station
Tanimachi Rokuchōme N 18 towards Taishō	Nagahori Tsurumi-ryokuchi Line	Morinomiya N 20 towards Kadoma-minami
Location
- Location within Osaka Prefecture Location within Japan

Tamatsukuri Station (玉造駅, Tamatsukuri-eki) is a railway station and metro station complex in Tennōji-ku, Osaka, Japan. It is on the Osaka Loop Line of West Japan Railway Company (JR West) and the Nagahori Tsurumi-ryokuchi Line of Osaka Metro.

== Lines ==
- West Japan Railway Company (JR West)
  - Osaka Loop Line
- Osaka Metro
  - Nagahori Tsurumi-ryokuchi Line (Station Number: N19)

== Layout ==
=== JR West Osaka Loop Line ===
There are two side platforms with two tracks elevated.

1	■ Osaka Loop Line	inner track for Kyōbashi and Osaka
2	■ Osaka Loop Line	outer track for Tsuruhashi and Tennōji

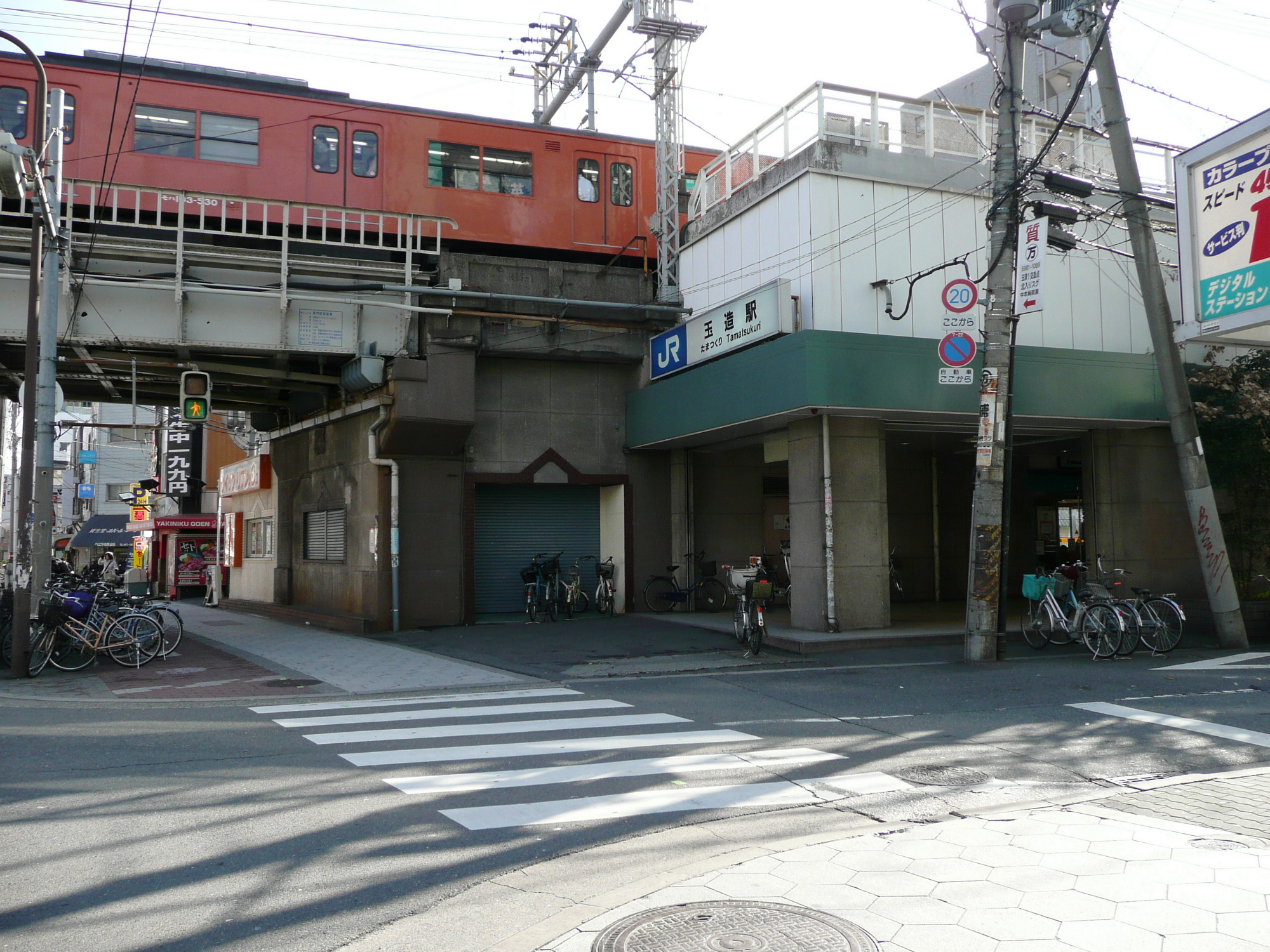
JR West station building

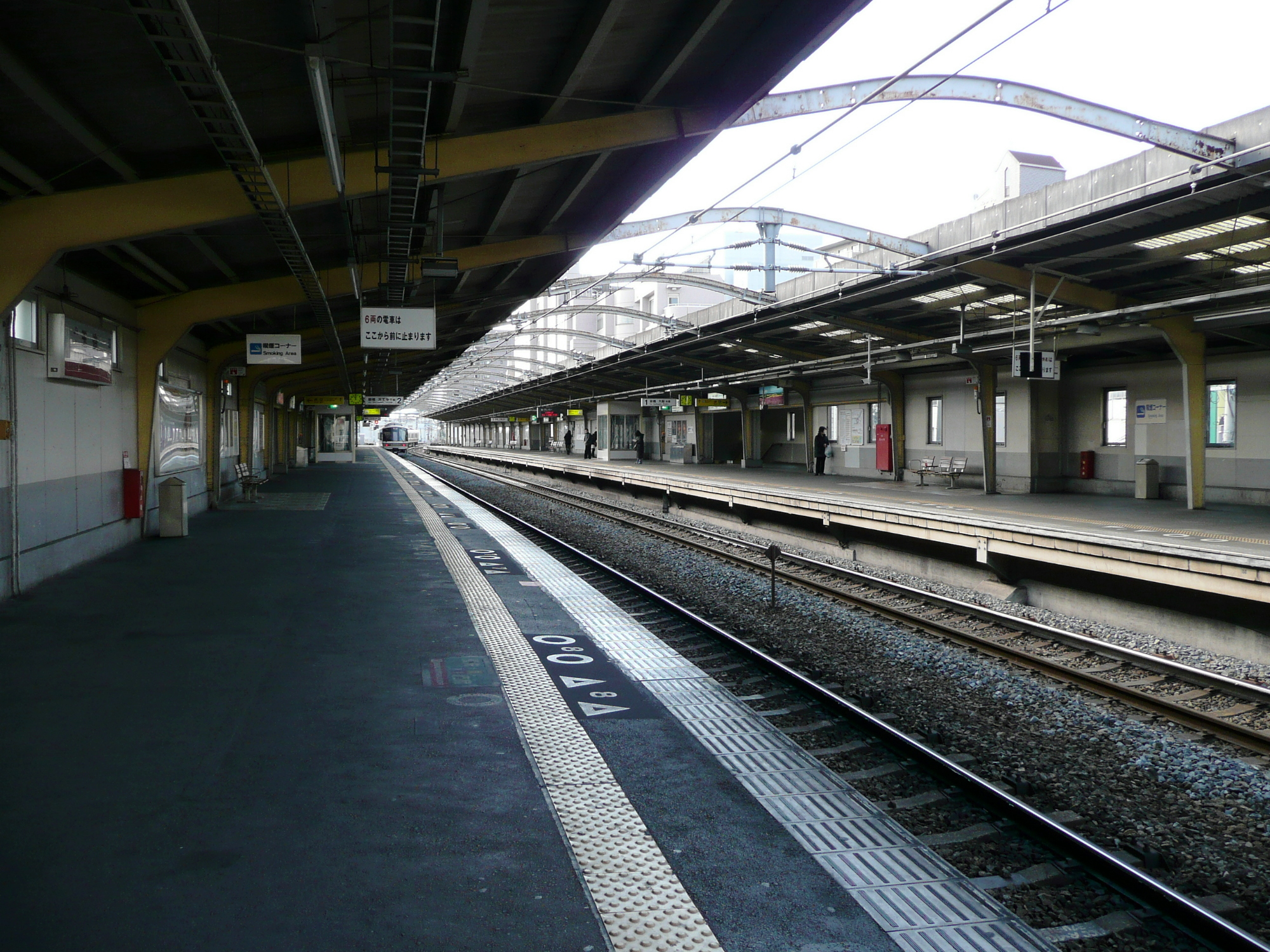
JR West tracks

=== Osaka Metro Nagahori Tsurumi-ryokuchi Line ===
There is an island platform fenced with platform gates between 2 tracks underground.

1	■ Nagahori Tsurumi-ryokuchi Line	for Kyōbashi and Kadomaminami
2	■ Nagahori Tsurumi-ryokuchi Line	for Shinsaibashi and Taishō

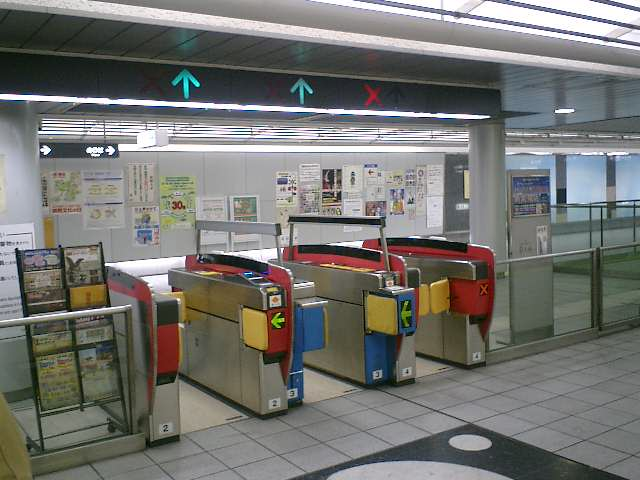
Subway ticket gates

== Surrounding area ==
=== Schools ===
- Osaka Prefectural Shimizudani High School
- Josei Gakuen Junior and Senior High School
- Osaka Jogakuin Junior and Senior High School
- Meisei Junior and Senior High School
- Osaka Jogakuin College and Junior College

=== Head offices ===
- Morishita Jintan Co., Ltd.
- Kyocera Mita Corporation

=== Others ===
- Dondoro Taishi Zempuku-ji
- Tamatsukuri Inari Shrine

== History ==
Station numbering was introduced to the JR Line in March 2018 with Osaka Loop Line platforms being assigned station number JR-O05.

== Adjacent stations ==
«	Service	»
West Japan Railway Company (JR West) Osaka Loop Line
Tsuruhashi	All types	Morinomiya
Osaka Metro Nagahori Tsurumi Ryokuchi Line
Tanimachi Rokuchōme	Subway	Morinomiya
