= Osaka International Cancer Institute =

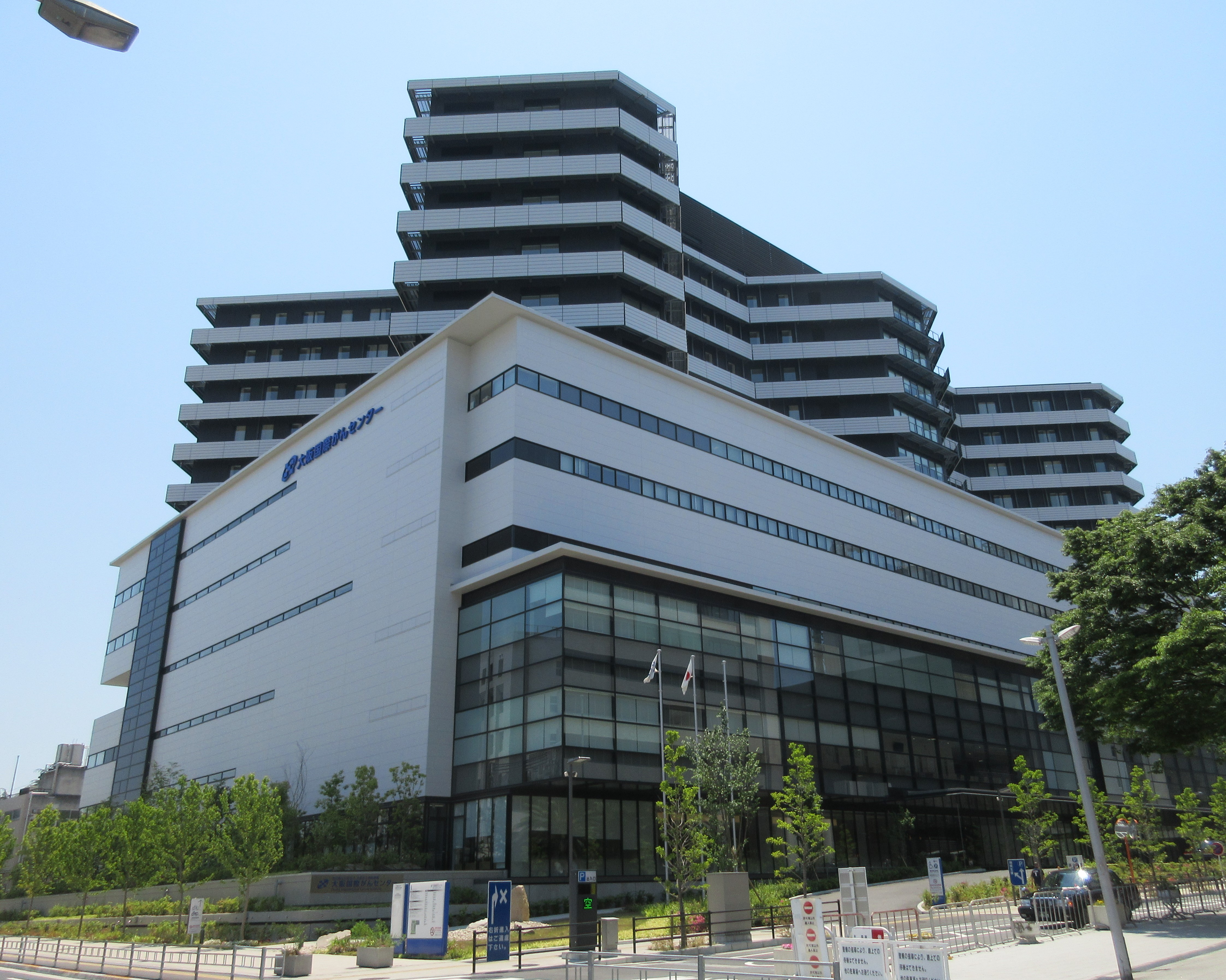
- Hospital exterior

Geography
- Location: Chūō-ku, Osaka, Japan
- Coordinates: 34.68499319414009°N 135.51948154287683°E

Organisation
- Type: Public

Services
- Emergency department: Yes
- Beds: 500

Helipads
- Helipad: Yes

Osaka International Cancer Institute (大阪国際がんセンター) is located in Otemae, Chūō-ku, Osaka, Japan. It has 500 beds and is run by the Osaka Prefectural government. This hospital specializes in cancer and adult illness.

== History ==
The hospital was established in March 2017.

== Departments ==
- Internal Medicine
  - Gastroenterology
  - Gastroenterology
  - Respiratory Medicine
  - Blood / Chemotherapy
  - Clinical Oncology
- Surgery
  - Gastroenterological Surgery
  - Respiratory Surgery
  - Breast / Endocrine Surgery (breast gland, thyroid)
  - Neurosurgery
  - Gynecology
  - Urology
  - Otolaryngology (head and neck surgery)
  - Orthopedic Surgery
  - Radiotherapy
- Examination Department
  - Digestive Examination Department
  - Precision Diagnosis Department (Human Dock)
- Central Surgery Department
- Laboratory Diagnosis Department
  - Isotope Department
  - Radiology Department
  - Clinical Laboratory Department
  - Pathology / Cytopathology Department

== Transport ==
The hospital is 5-minute walk from Tanimachi Yonchōme Station on the Osaka Metro.

== See also ==
- List of hospitals in Japan
