= Shimizudani High School =

Osaka Prefectural Shimizudani High School
- 大阪府立清水谷高等学校

Location
- 2-44 Shimizudani-cho; Tennōji-ku, Osaka, 543-0001; Japan; 34°40′29.5″N 135°31′29.3″E

Information
- Type: Public secondary, Co-educational
- Motto: 愛と恕 Ai to Jo (Love and Sympathy)
- Established: 1900
- Grades: 16-18
- Enrollment: 960
- Campus: Urban
- Website: Official Web Site
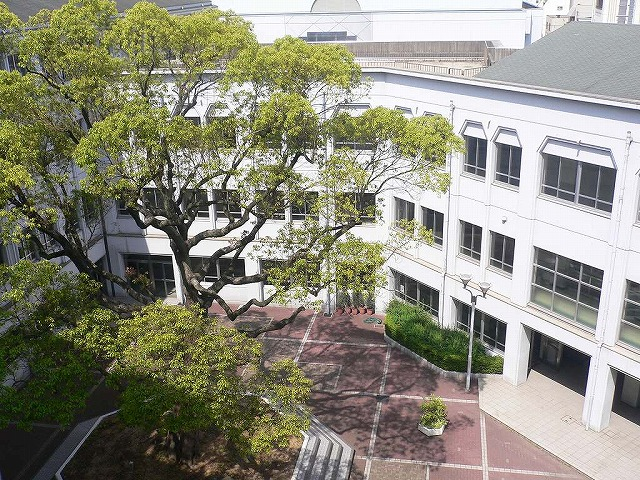
- Main Building

Osaka Prefectural Shimizudani High School (大阪府立清水谷高等学校, Osaka Furitsu Shimizudani Kōtōgakkō) is a Japanese public co-educational senior high school (secondary school), located in Tennōji-ku, Osaka, Japan.

== Overview ==
Shimizudani is one of the oldest high schools in Osaka with a history of over 100 years. The school was founded in 1900, and named as Osaka Prefectural First Girls’ High School (traditional Japanese: 大阪府第一高等女學校).

"Shimizudani" was named from a place of Shimizu (清水, which means "pure water" or "clear stream") and Tani (Dani) (谷, which means 'valley'), which means the place that the clear stream flows through.

Shimizudani High School is located on the northern part of "Uemachi Plateau" that is the center of Osaka from ancient times, and the South-West of Osaka Castle, and the south side of the Naniwa Palace. Therefore, it is said that there's "Suzaku Avenue" under the Shimizudani.

In former times, Shimizudani was the elite school, and place of the cultivation of many an upper class young lady. For example, famous graduates of this school include Kawashima Itoko (grandmother of Princess Akishino; great-grandmother of Prince Hisahito of Akishino), Tanizaki Matsuko (wife of Jun'ichirō Tanizaki, and a model in Tanizaki's novel "The Makioka Sisters (novel)"—portrait of the daily life of the upper class of Kansai). The number of Shimizudani graduates is more than 30,000 people.

Shimizudani is the origin school of the "School uniform" in Osaka. The Sailor suit style uniform is called "Shimizudani blue", and designed with three line of bright white by a light blue collar cover. "Shimizudani blue" is very popular in Japan, and appeared in the TV drama Asadora ("Morning Drama") on NHK (Japan's National Broadcasting Corporation) many times. Miho Kanno, Juri Ueno, Satomi Ishihara wore "Shimizudani blue".

Shimizudani is famous for not only the entrance into a school of higher grade to the famous university, but also the Classroom (Homeroom) and Club activities, like the Chorus Club, the Orchestra Ensemble Club, etc.

== History ==
=== Brief history ===
Shimizudani took a role as the symbol of "the girl's education" in Japan.

The early days of "The Meiji period (明治時代, Meiji jidai) (1868–1912; Japan started its modernization), Japan's "the girl's education" was a low level, insufficient at degree to give necessary "Sewing and Cooking" for real life.

It would be changed by "the girls' high school law" in February, 1899. The Shimizudani was decided to undergo the opening of a school by Ministry of Education notification 194 as the Osaka prefectural management first girls' high school.

The site of Shimizudani was a construction site of the Japan Women's University by Jinzoh Naruse, at first.

Therefore, the passion of the educational front for Shimizudani as the Osaka's first girls' high school was hot. The placement of the teacher was regarded as important, too. Ōmura Chujiro described as "the incarnation of the girl education in Japan" took office as Shimizudani's first principal.

What you should mention specially is Nagai Koji who started for its new post as a music department teacher. Even music education brought up Shimizudani in the palace, but "the girl music textbook" which he edited as the teaching materials came to be used as a standard book in girls' high schools in Japan. Nagai will found "Osaka music school" (Osaka College of Music) later.

Japanese Celebrities cooperated from the various fields to raise culture and the judgment of the Shimizudani's student and gave a lecture. Including Ōkuma Shigenobu (the 8th and 17th Prime Minister of Japan) and Shibusawa Eiichi (known as the "father of Japanese capitalism"), more than 120 visit the Shimizudani just to win through up to a record of 20 years after foundation (Refer to the following chronological).

In addition, Prime minister Prince Kinmochi Saionji wrote to the Shimizudani's alumnus Hall "Saibikan" to show the thought of "the serious consideration to the girl education". Because, Saionji interchanged with Naruse ( = a friend of Omura, the Shimizudani's principal) and supported it as an establishment promoter of Naruse's "Japan Women's University".

Therefore, popularity of Shimizudani was too very high, and the students who were not able to enter it appeared one after another. So Shimizudani's alumnus organization "Seiyukai" founded a sister school "Seiyu high School" in Yao, Osaka.

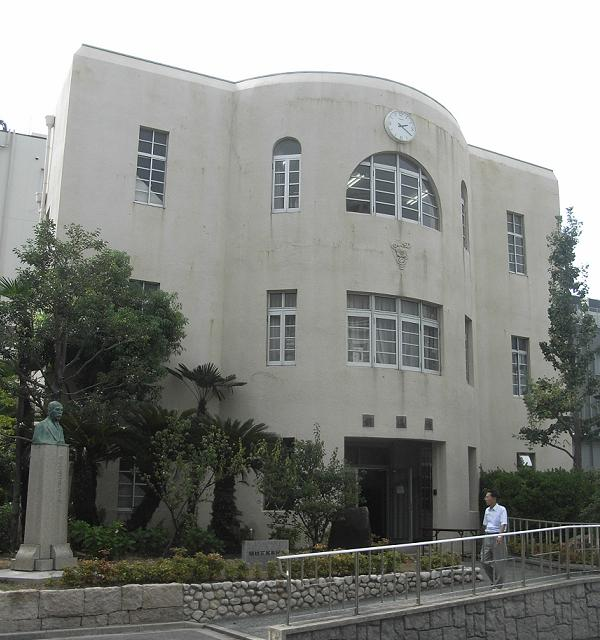
The Saibikan was built with the reinforced concrete construction for the Shimizudani's alumnus Hall in 1925. A bust appearing in the lower left is the first principal "Chujiro Omura".

=== Chronological table ===
- 1900 (the 33rd year of Meiji period (明治, Meiji)) - Found as "the Osaka First girls' high school".
- 1901 - Renamed to "the Osaka Prefectural Shimizudani girls' high school". Baron Takaki Kanehiro visits and gives a lecture.
- 1903 - Class reunion organization (alumnus organization) "Seiyukai" start.
- 1906 - Ōkuma Shigenobu the 8th and 17th Prime Minister of Japan, and Chikaaki Takasaki, the Governor of Osaka, Kenjiro Yamakawa, who resigned the Tokyo Imperial University president in 1905, give a lecture.
- 1907 - The alumnus Hall "Saibikan" was built as the 5th anniversary foundation.
- 1911 - Shibusawa Eiichi, a Japanese industrialist, gives a lecture.
- 1916 - Establish "the Osaka girls' high school of Art" as the 15th anniversary foundation.
- 1925 - Student sings appearance in a program as Osaka broadcasting station (NHK Osaka) opening of an office memory.
- 1926 - Wakatsuki Reijirō, the prime minister of Japan, gives a lecture. As the 25th anniversary foundation memory, erect "Shimizudani Shrine" on the site.
- 1927 (the 2nd year of Taisho period (大正, Taisho)) - Benito Mussolini, 40th Prime Minister of Italy, give a handwriting message for the Shimizudani.
- 1930 - Junnosuke Inoue, the Minister of Finance (Japan), gives a lecture.
- 1931 - Nitobe Inazō, the Under Secretary General of the League of Nations, gives a lecture.
- 1933 - Nitobe Inazō gives a lecture again.
- 1934 - The "Seiyukai" becomes the corporate judicial person of the Ministry of Education authorization.
- 1941 - The "Seiyukai" establishes a sister school "Seiyu Academy girl's high school" as 40th anniversary foundation memory, and the commemoration of Japan's 2600th anniversary.
- 1944 - The alumnus Hall "Saibikan" is used as a classroom of the Osaka teacher's training school (parts of the Osaka Imperial University).
- 1948 - With educational system' reform, renamed to "Osaka Prefectural Shimizudani High School" from the Shimizudani girls' high school.
- 1961 - The 60th anniversary memory magazine is published, and the 60th anniversary memory ceremony is held.
- 1971 - The 70th anniversary memory magazine is published, and the 70th anniversary memory ceremony is held.
- 1981 - The 80th anniversary memory magazine is published, and the 80th anniversary memory ceremony is held.
- 1991 (the 3rd year of Heisei period (平成, Heisei)) - The 90th anniversary foundation commemorative ceremony conduct.
- 1995 - The new school building (the 3rd version) is completed.
- 2001 - The 100th anniversary memory magazine is published, and the 100th anniversary memory ceremony is held at " Osaka International Convention Center (GRAND CUBE OSAKA), "Fusae Ota, Governor of Osaka Prefecture attendance

== Access ==
- Osaka Municipal Bus - "Shimizudani-koko-mae" Bus Stop
- West Japan Railway Company Osaka Loop Line - Tamatsukuri Station or Tsuruhashi Station
- Tanimachi Line - Tanimachi Rokuchōme Station or Tanimachi Kyūchōme Station
- Nagahori Tsurumi-ryokuchi Line - Tamatsukuri Station or Tanimachi Rokuchōme Station
- Sennichimae Line - Tanimachi Kyūchōme Station or Tsuruhashi Station
- Kintetsu (Osaka Line and Namba Line) - Osaka Uehommachi Station or Tsuruhashi Station

== Alumni ==
- Takashi Yamamoto (山本 孝史, Yamamoto Takashi) - Japanese politician of the Democratic Party of Japan, a member of the House of Councillors in the Diet (national legislature).
- Takamitsu Azuma (東 孝光, Azuma Takamitsu) - Architect of "Tower House"
- Yukihiro Okimura (沖村 志宏, Okimura Yukihiro) - Cinematographer
- Etsushi Toyokawa (豊川 悦司, Toyokawa Etsushi) - Japanese actor
- Takatoshi Yoshizumi (Terry Yoshizumi) - Professor of Radiology, Duke University

See also.

- Osaka Prefectural Board of Education
- Education in Japan
- Kinmochi Saionji
- Kaohsiung Municipal Kaohsiung Senior High School - International exchange
- Municipal Kaohsiung Girls' Senior High School - International exchange
