= Osaka-jō Hall =

Multi-purpose hall in Kyōbashi, Japan

Osaka-jo Hall
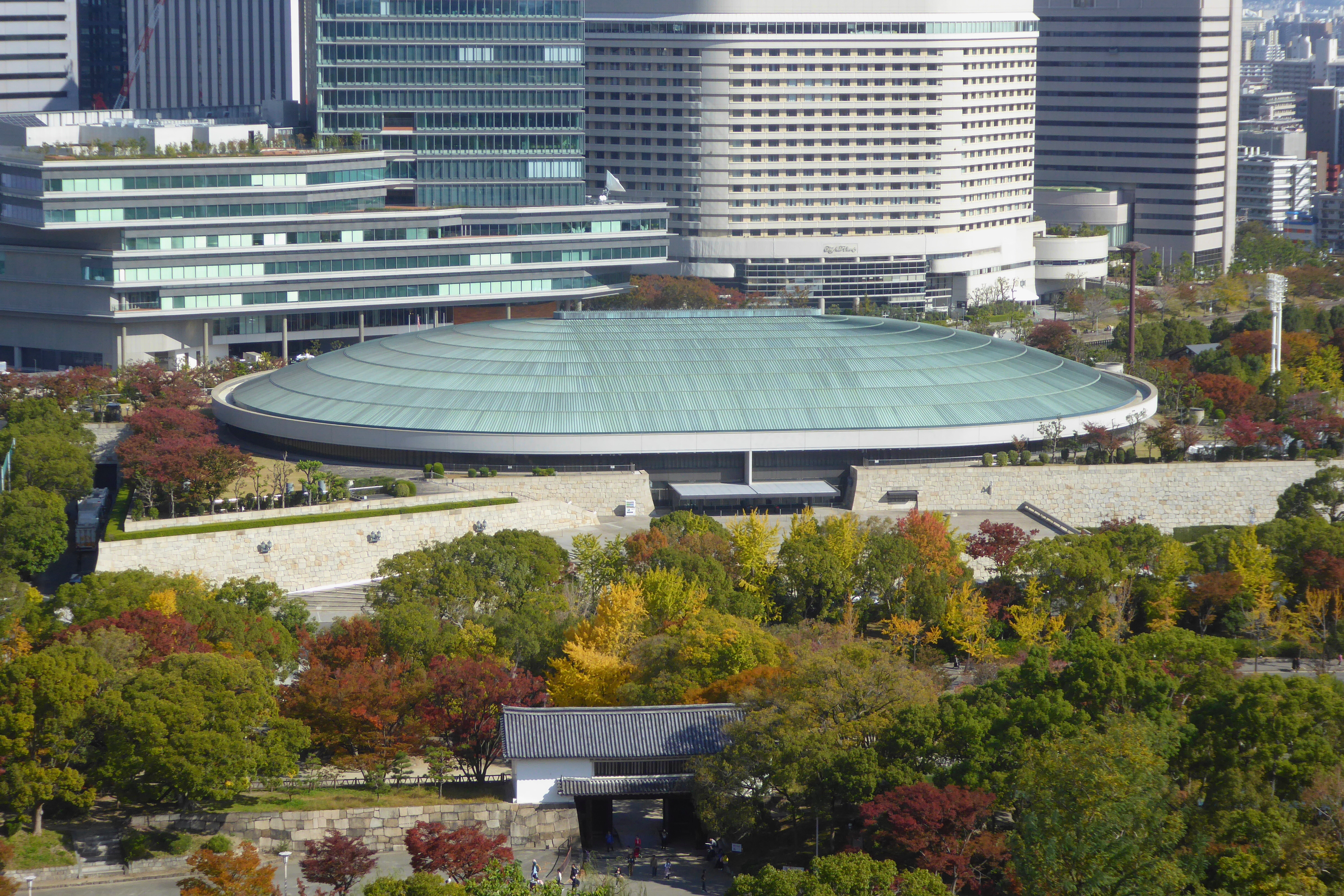
- Osaka-jo Hall from Osaka Castle in 2019
- Interactive map of Osaka-jo Hall
- Location: Chūō-ku, Osaka
- Coordinates: 34°41′22″N 135°31′47″E
- Owner: Osaka-jo Hall, Inc.
- Capacity: 16,000
- Public transit: Osaka Metro: Nagahori Tsurumi-ryokuchi Line at Osaka Business Park; JR West: Osakajōkōen (Osaka Loop Line)

Construction
- Opened: 1 October 1983
- Architect: Nikken Sekkei
- Main contractors: Taisei Corporation, Matsumura-Gumi

Tenant
- New Japan Pro-Wrestling

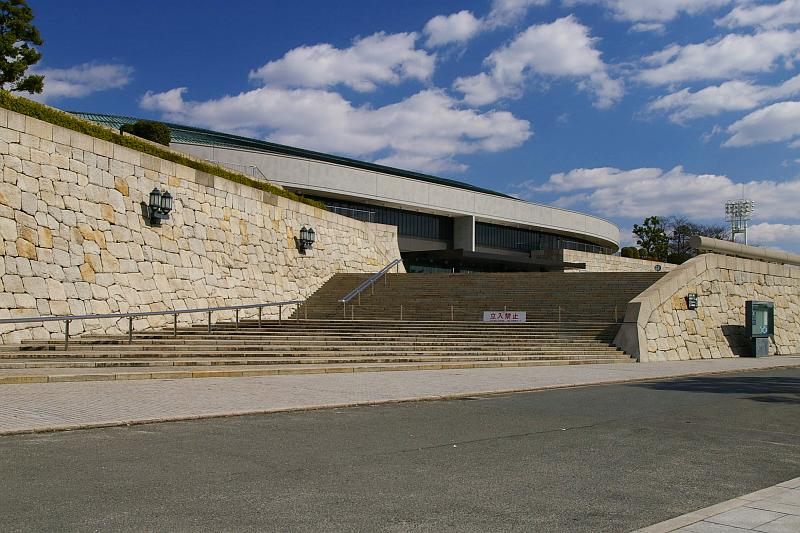
Entrance to the hall

Osaka-jo Hall (大阪城ホール, Ōsaka-jō Hōru) is a multi-purpose arena located in the Kyōbashi area of Osaka, Japan. The hall opened in 1983 and can seat up to 16,000 people. Built on a site area of 36,351 square meters (391,280 ft^{2}), part of its form uses stone walls, modeled after those of Osaka Castle and it won the Osaka Urban Scenery Architects Prize Special Award in 1984.

It is used for some sports, such as judo championships and wrestling matches such as those for the New Japan Pro-Wrestling's annual NJPW Dominion event. The venue has also been used for The New Beginning in Osaka in 2020, New Japan Cup finals in 2020 and 2022, and Castle Attack in 2021. The venue is popular for concerts, with many native and international pop and rock music artists.

Every December, approximately 10,000 people come to the arena to participate in a performance of Beethoven's Symphony No. 9.

== Location ==
The hall may be reached on a short walk from either Osaka Business Park Station on the Osaka Municipal Subway Nagahori Tsurumi-ryokuchi Line or Osakajōkōen Station on the JR Osaka Loop Line. The hall is located in Osaka-jō Park, near Osaka Castle and is across a river from two other smaller concert halls.

== Building specifications ==
- Building area: 19,351.22 m^{2} (208,294.8 ft^{2})
- Total floor area: 36,173.80 m^{2} (389,371.5 ft^{2})
- Building: 3 floors, 1 basement
- Total cost: 10.6 billion yen
- Facilities:
  - Arena: 3,500 m^{2}; 38,000 ft^{2} (width 83.4 m or 274 ft, length 48.2 m or 158 ft, height 21 m or 69 ft)
  - Shiromi Hall: 827 m^{2} (8,900 ft^{2})
  - Convention Hall: 159 m^{2} (1,710 ft^{2})

== Events ==
Many popular musical acts have played the arena, including Nana Mizuki, LiSA, Hikaru Utada, Alexandros, B'z, George Harrison & Eric Clapton, Mötley Crüe, Duran Duran, Red Hot Chili Peppers, Momoiro Clover Z, NMB48, Dir En Grey, Babymetal, Iron Maiden, Pink Floyd, Ayumi Hamasaki, Britney Spears, Janet Jackson, Whitney Houston, Celine Dion, Mariah Carey, Maroon 5, Misia, Kylie Minogue, Tina Turner, Gloria Estefan, Taylor Swift, Gen Hoshino, Prince, L'Arc-en-Ciel, David Bowie, George Michael, Patrick Fiori, Bon Jovi, Genesis, Alanis Morissette, Rod Stewart, Oasis, Alice in Chains, Nine Inch Nails, Green Day, Beyoncé, Christina Aguilera, Björk, David Guetta, Avril Lavigne, The Black Eyed Peas, Norah Jones, John Mayer, Sarah Brightman, Westlife, BoA, 2NE1, Girls' Generation, Justin Bieber, Ed Sheeran, E-girls, Exo, Shinee, BTS, Shishamo, Seventeen, Twice, Red Velvet, Scandal, Blackpink, Monsta X, iKON, NCT 127, Radwimps, One Ok Rock, Dead or Alive, Queen, Bruce Springsteen and the E Street Band, Le Sserafim, Illit and Aqours.

== See also ==
- List of indoor arenas in Japan
