= Tanimachi Yonchōme Station =

Metro station in Osaka, Japan

Coordinates: 34°40′54.89″N 135°31′2.23″E

Tanimachi Yonchōme Station 谷町四丁目駅
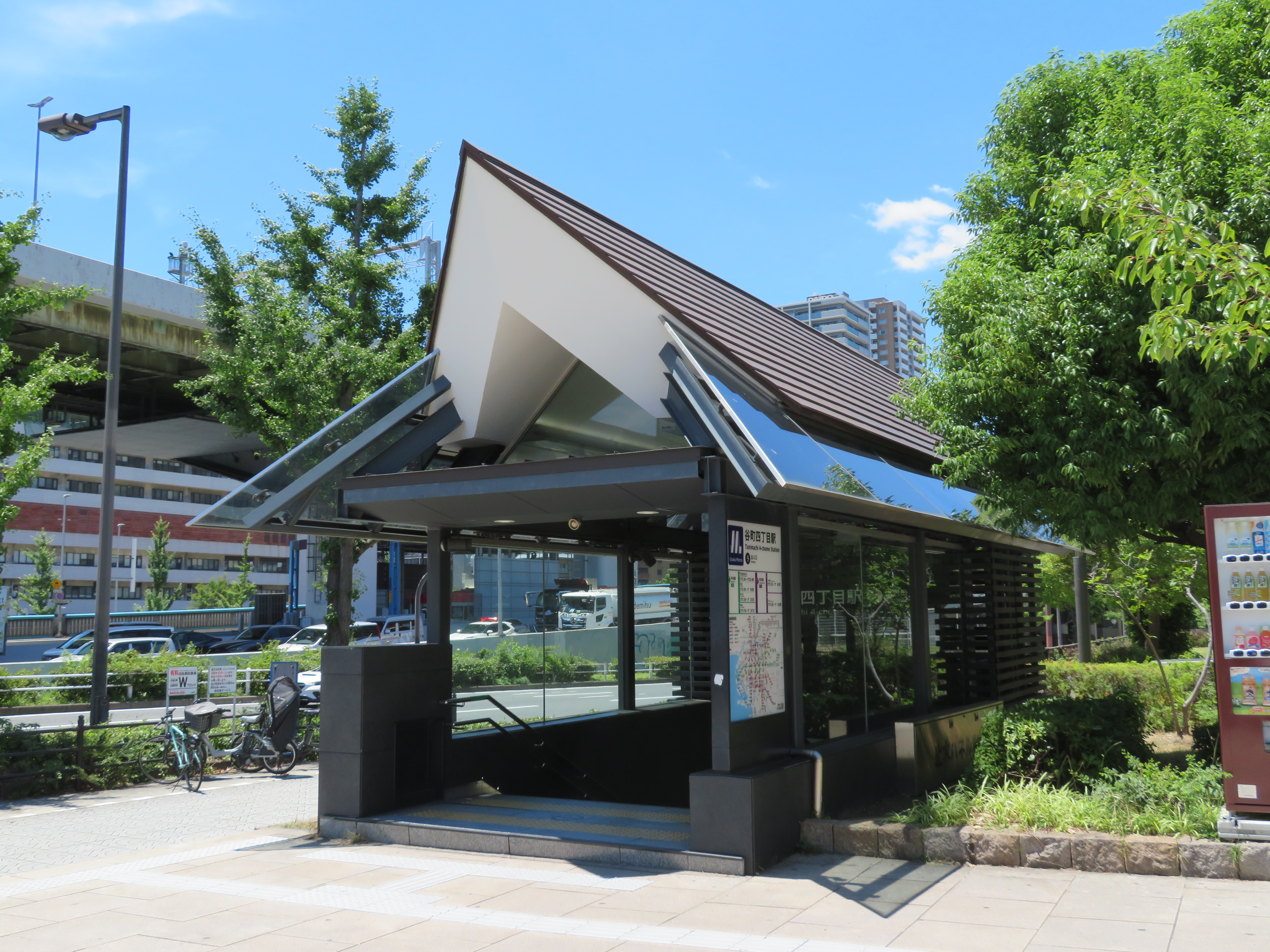
- No.9 exit

General information
- Other names: Tani Yon
- System: Osaka Metro
- Operator: Osaka Metro
- Lines: Tanimachi Line; Chūō Line
- Platforms: 2 island platforms (1 for each line)
- Tracks: 4 (2 for each line)

Construction
- Structure type: Underground

Other information
- Station code: T 23 C 18

History
- Opened: 24 March 1967; 59 years ago

Services
Preceding station	Osaka Metro	Following station
Temmabashi T 22 towards Dainichi	Tanimachi Line	Tanimachi Rokuchome T 24 towards Yaominami
Sakaisuji-Hommachi C 17 towards Yumeshima	Chūō Line	Morinomiya C 19 towards Nagata
Location
- Location within Osaka Prefecture Location within Japan

Tanimachi Yonchome Station (谷町四丁目駅, -eki) is a subway station of the Osaka Metro located in Chūō-ku, Osaka, Japan, and the station is also called "Tani Yon (たによん)".

== Lines ==
- Osaka Metro
  - Tanimachi Line (T23)
  - Chūō Line (C18)

== Layout ==
There are two side platforms with two tracks for the Tanimachi Line on the second basement, and two side platforms with two tracks for the Chūō Line over the Tanimachi Line. Passages are located between the south of the platforms for the Tanimachi Line and the west of the platforms for the Chūō Line.

Tanimachi Line

1	■ Tanimachi Line	for Tennoji and Yaominami
2	■ Tanimachi Line	for Higashi-Umeda, Miyakojima and Dainichi

Chūō Line

1	■ Chūō Line	for Morinomiya, Nagata, Ikoma and Gakken Nara-Tomigaoka
2	■ Chūō Line	for Homachi, Bentencho, Osakako and Yumeshima

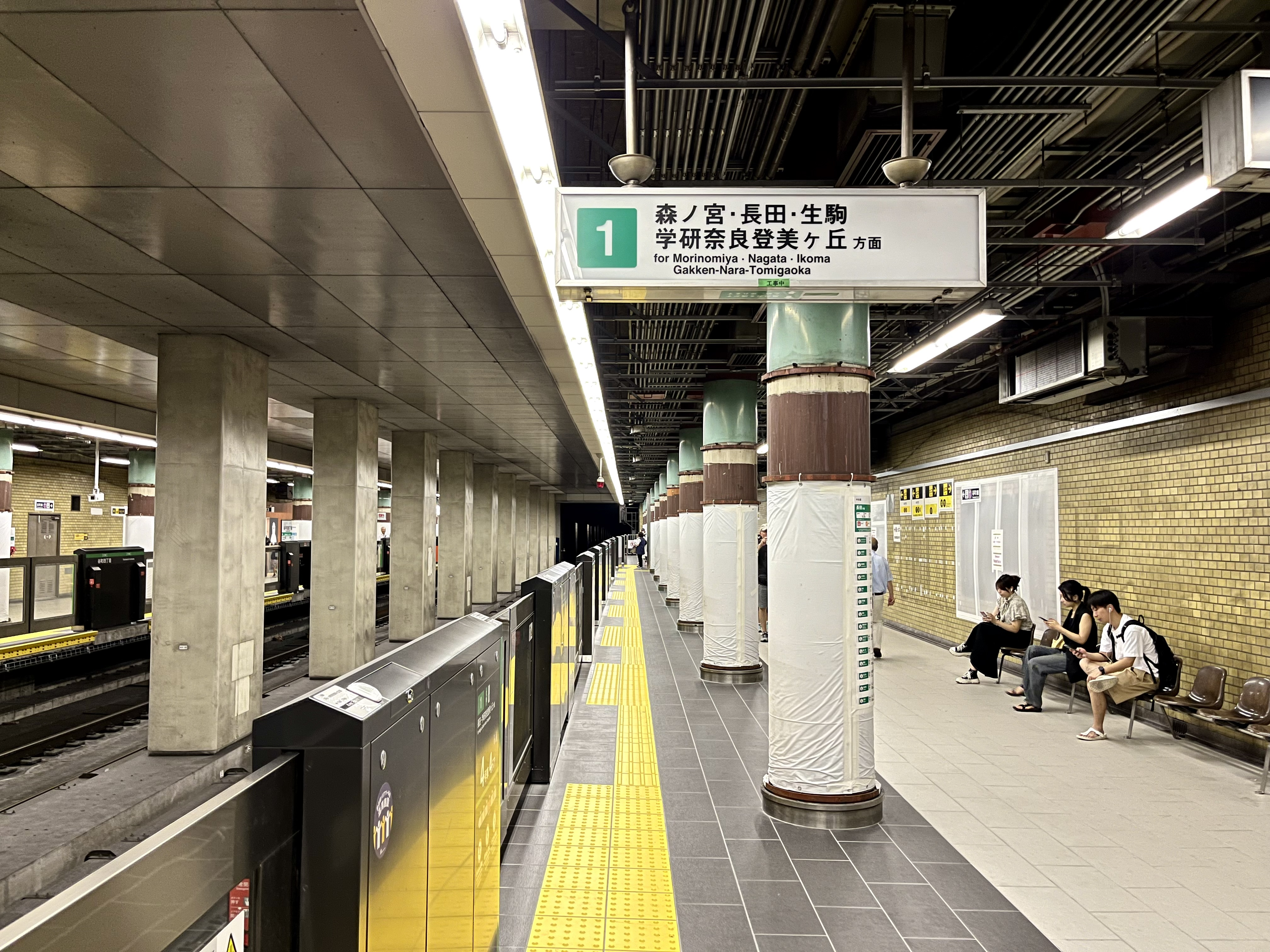
Chuo Line platforms

== Surroundings ==
- NHK Osaka Broadcasting Station
- Osaka Museum of History
- Osaka Prefectural Government Building
- Osaka Prefecturel Police Head Building
- Osaka Castle
- National Hospital Organization Osaka National Hospital
- Osaka International Cancer Institute
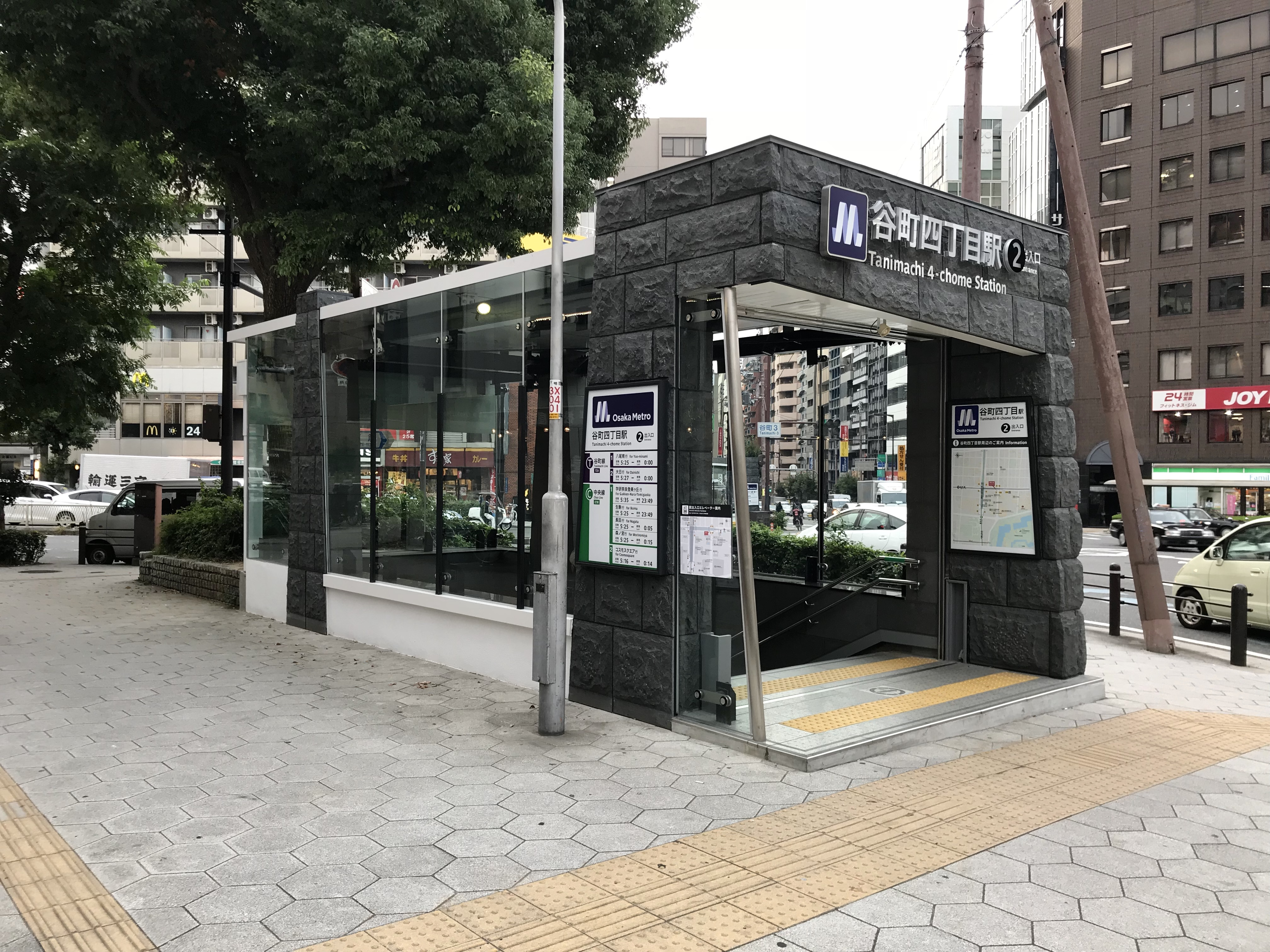
Exit 2
