= Morinomiya Station =

Railway and metro station in Osaka, Japan

Morinomiya Station 森ノ宮駅
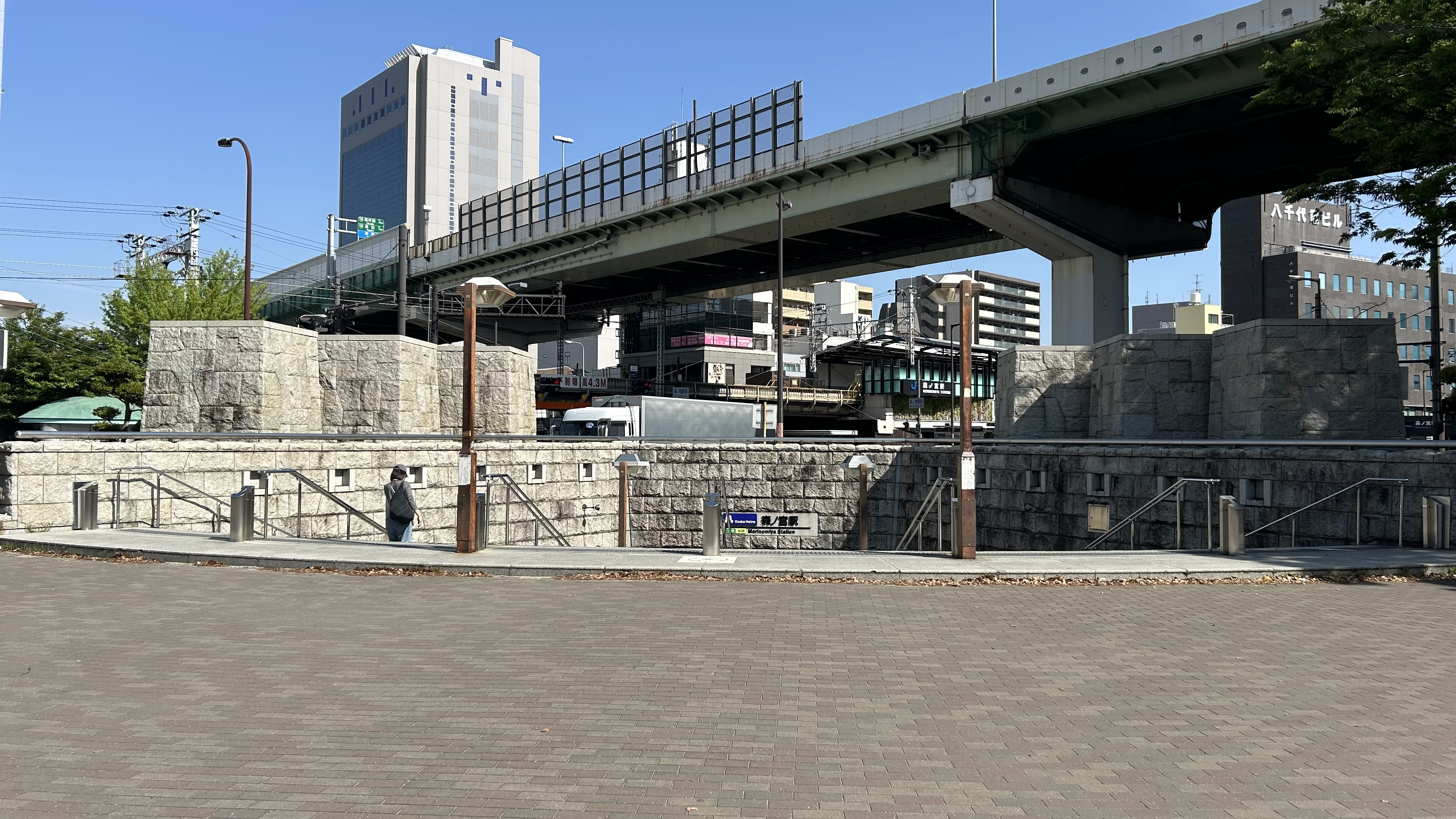
- Entrance 3B of the metro station in the foreground, with the JR station behind, 2025

General information
- Location: Morinomiya-chūō Itchome, Chūō, Osaka, Osaka （大阪市中央区森ノ宮中央一丁目） Japan
- Operator: JR West; Osaka Metro
Location

Morinomiya Station (森ノ宮駅, Morinomiya-eki) is a railway and subway station in Chūō-ku, Osaka, Japan.

== Lines ==
- JR West
  - Osaka Loop Line (Station number: JR-O06)
- Osaka Metro
  - Chūō Line (Station number: C19)
  - Nagahori Tsurumi-ryokuchi Line (Station number: N20)

== Layout ==
=== Morinomiya Station layout ===
2F; JR West	Side platform, doors will open on the left
2F; JR West	Platform 2	→ O Osaka Loop Line clockwise (Tamatsukuri) →
2F; JR West	Platform 1	← O Osaka Loop Line counterclockwise (Ōsakajōkōen)
2F; JR West	Side platform, doors will open on the left
1F	Street Level	Exit/Entrance, JR West fare control
B1F	Mezzanine	Osaka Metro fare control, transfer corridor
B2F	Platform 1	→ Chūō Line toward Nagata (Midoribashi) → → Chūō Line termination platform
B2F	Island platform, doors will open on the left/right
B2F	Platform 2	→ Chūō Line toward Nagata (Midoribashi) →
B2F	Platform 3	← Chūō Line toward Yumeshima (Tanimachi Yonchōme)
B2F	Side platform, doors will open on the left
B3F	Platform 1	→ Nagahori Tsurumi-ryokuchi Line toward Kadoma-minami (Osaka Business Park) →
B3F	Island platform, doors will open on the right
B3F	Platform 2	← Nagahori Tsurumi-ryokuchi Line toward Taishō (Tamatsukuri)

=== West Japan Railway Company (JR West) ===
Morinomiya Station 森ノ宮駅
- JR station building, 2026

General information
- Location: 1-45, Morinomiya-chūō Itchōme, Chūō, Osaka, Osaka （大阪市中央区森ノ宮中央一丁目1-45） Japan
- Coordinates: 34°40′51.97″N 135°32′1.84″E
- System: JR West station
- Operator: West Japan Railway Company
- Line: Osaka Loop Line
- Platforms: 2 side platforms
- Tracks: 2

Other information
- Station code: JR-O06

History
- Opened: 21 April 1932
- Rebuilt: 2015
Location

There are two side platforms with two tracks elevated. Ticket gates are located only in the north.

1	■ Osaka Loop Line	inner track for Kyobashi and Osaka
2	■ Osaka Loop Line	outer track for Tsuruhashi and Tennoji

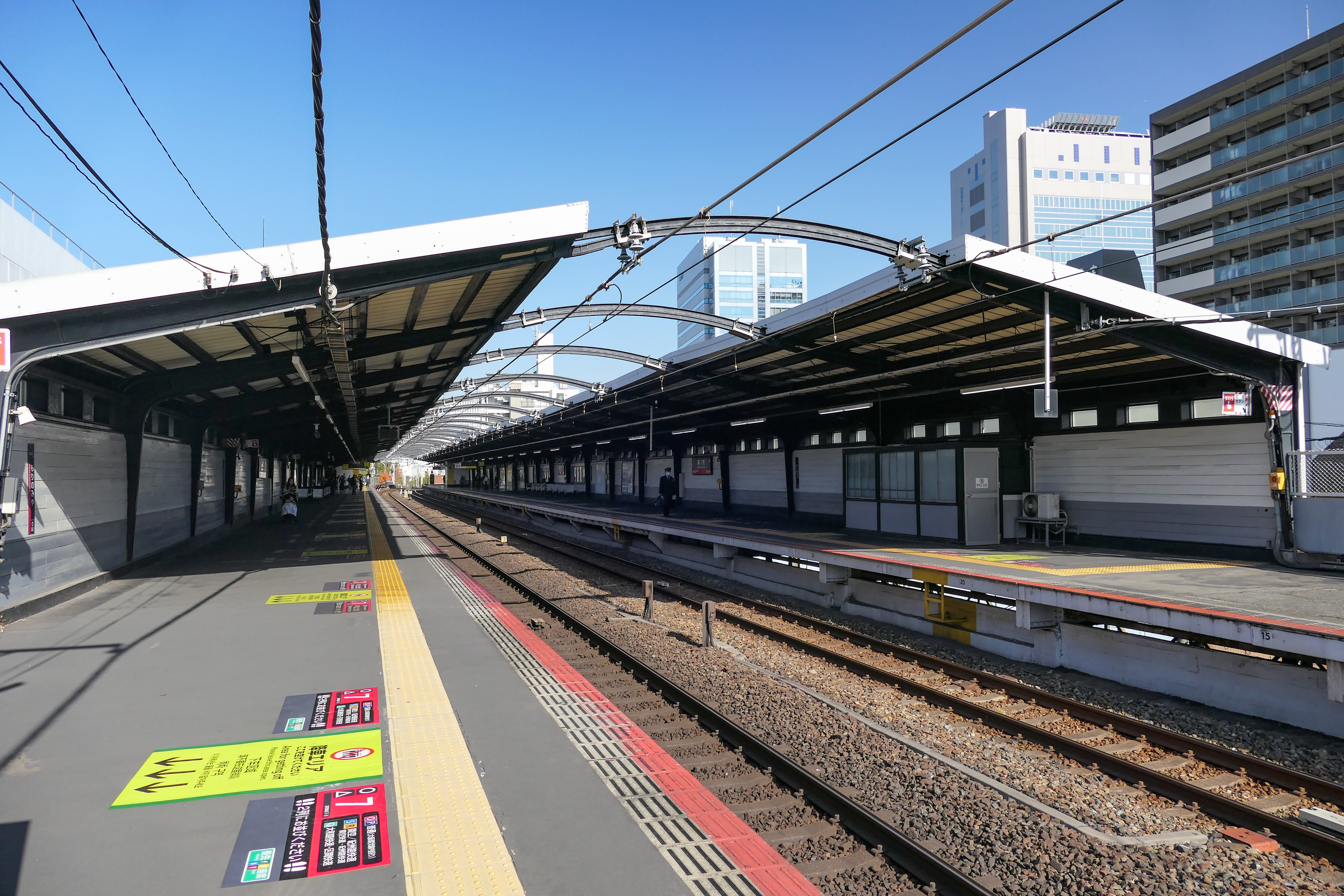
Platforms in 2023

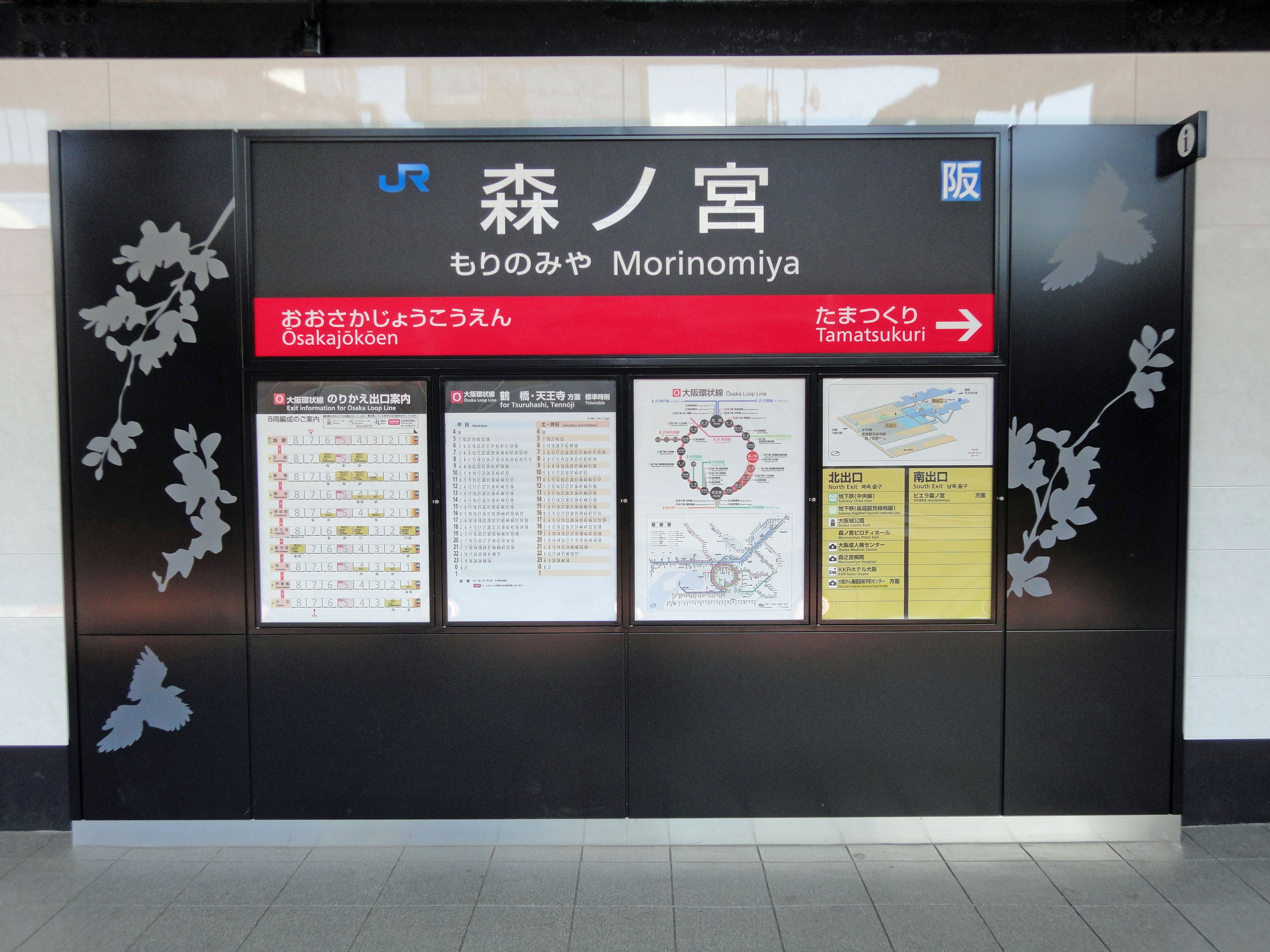
Station sign and information board, 2014

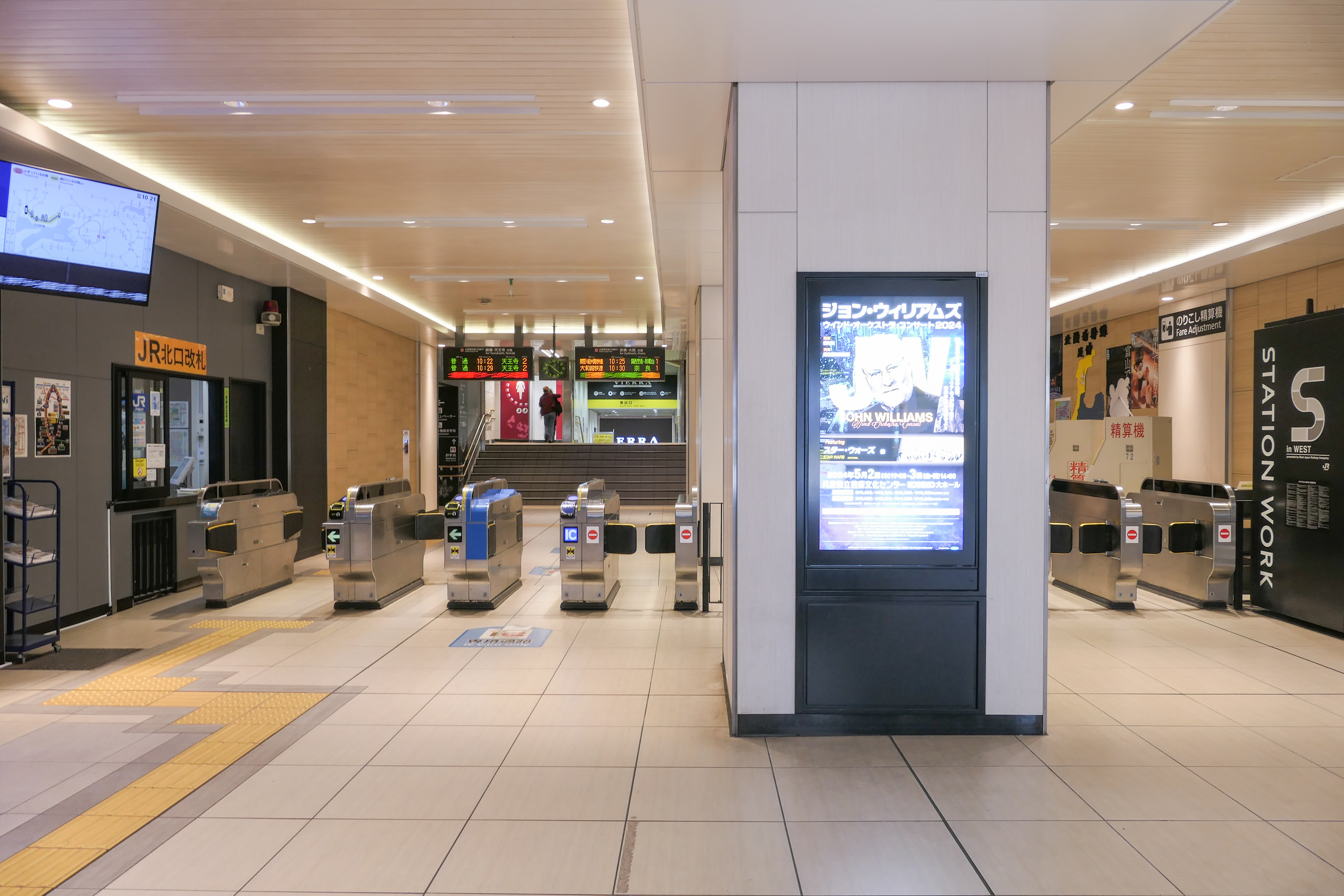
North exit ticket gate, 2023

=== History ===
Station numbering was introduced in March 2018 with Teradacho being assigned station number JR-O06.

=== Osaka Metro ===
Morinomiya Station 森ノ宮駅
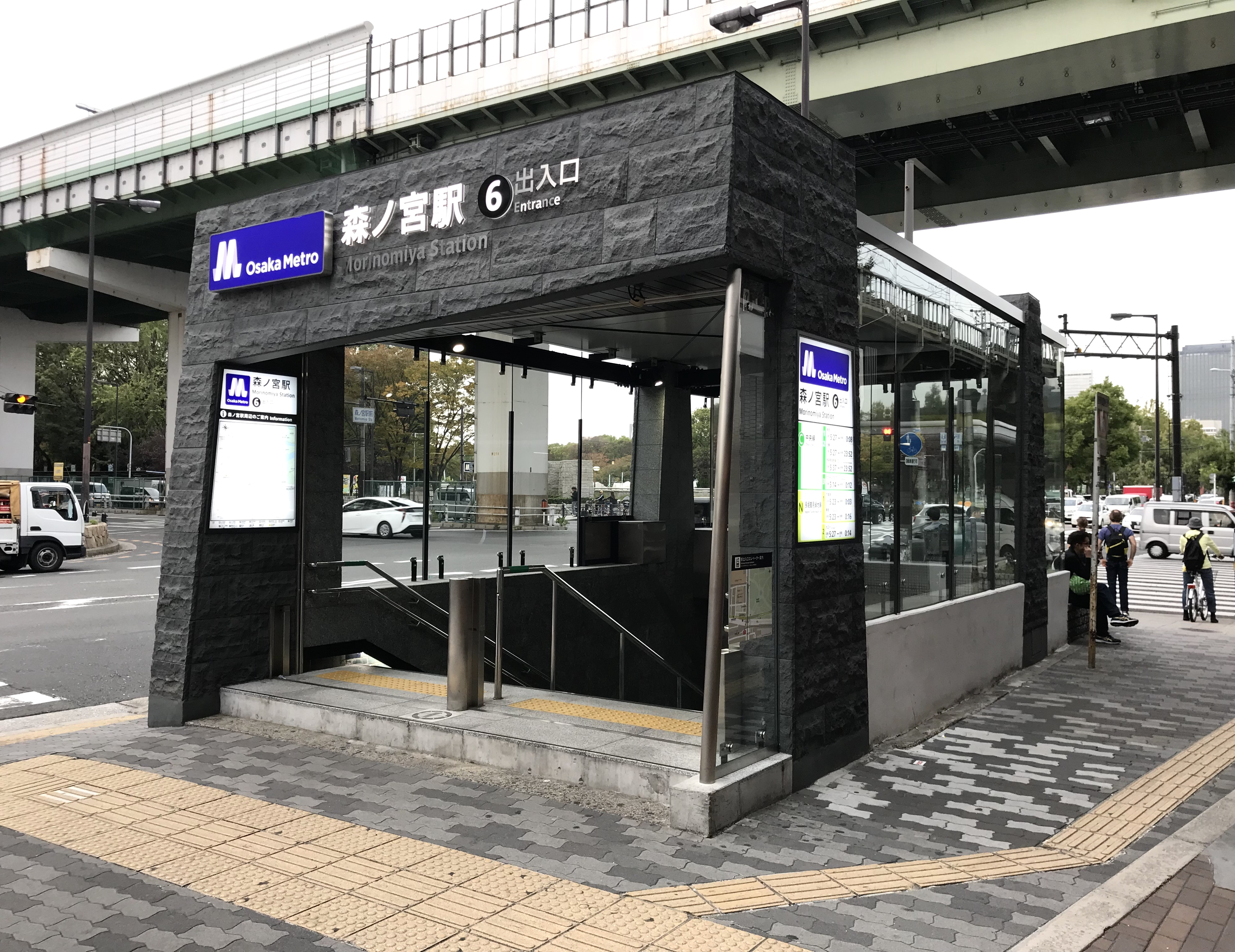
- Entrance 6 to the metro, 2018

General information
- Location: 1-43, Morinomiya-chūō Itchōme, Chūō, Osaka, Osaka （大阪市中央区森ノ宮中央一丁目1-43） Japan
- Coordinates: 34°40′53.24″N 135°32′1.84″E
- System: Osaka Metro
- Operator: Osaka Metro
- Lines: Chūō Line; Nagahori Tsurumi-ryokuchi Line
- Platforms: 1 island platform, 1 side platform (Chuo Line); 1 island platform (Nagahori Tsurumi-ryokuchi Line)
- Tracks: 5

Other information
- Station code: C 19 N 20

History
- Opened: 30 September 1967; 59 years ago
- Rebuilt: 1996

Services
Preceding station	Osaka Metro	Following station
Tanimachi Yonchōme C 18 towards Yumeshima	Chūō Line	Midoribashi C 20 towards Nagata
Tamatsukuri N 19 towards Taishō	Nagahori Tsurumi-ryokuchi Line	Osaka Business Park N 21 towards Kadoma-minami
Location

Chūō Line

There is an island platform and a side platform with three tracks under the ground level (2nd basement).

1	■ Chūō Line	(trains starting from or terminating at Morinomiya)
2	■ Chūō Line	for Nagata, Ikoma and Gakken Nara-Tomigaoka
3	■ Chūō Line	for Tanimachi Yonchome, Hommachi, Osakako and Cosmosquare

Nagahori Tsurumi-ryokuchi Line

There is an island platform fenced with platform gates between 2 tracks underground, in the east of the platforms for the Chūō Line.

1	■ Nagahori Tsurumi-ryokuchi Line	for Kyobashi and Kadomaminami
2	■ Nagahori Tsurumi-ryokuchi Line	for Shinsaibashi and Taisho

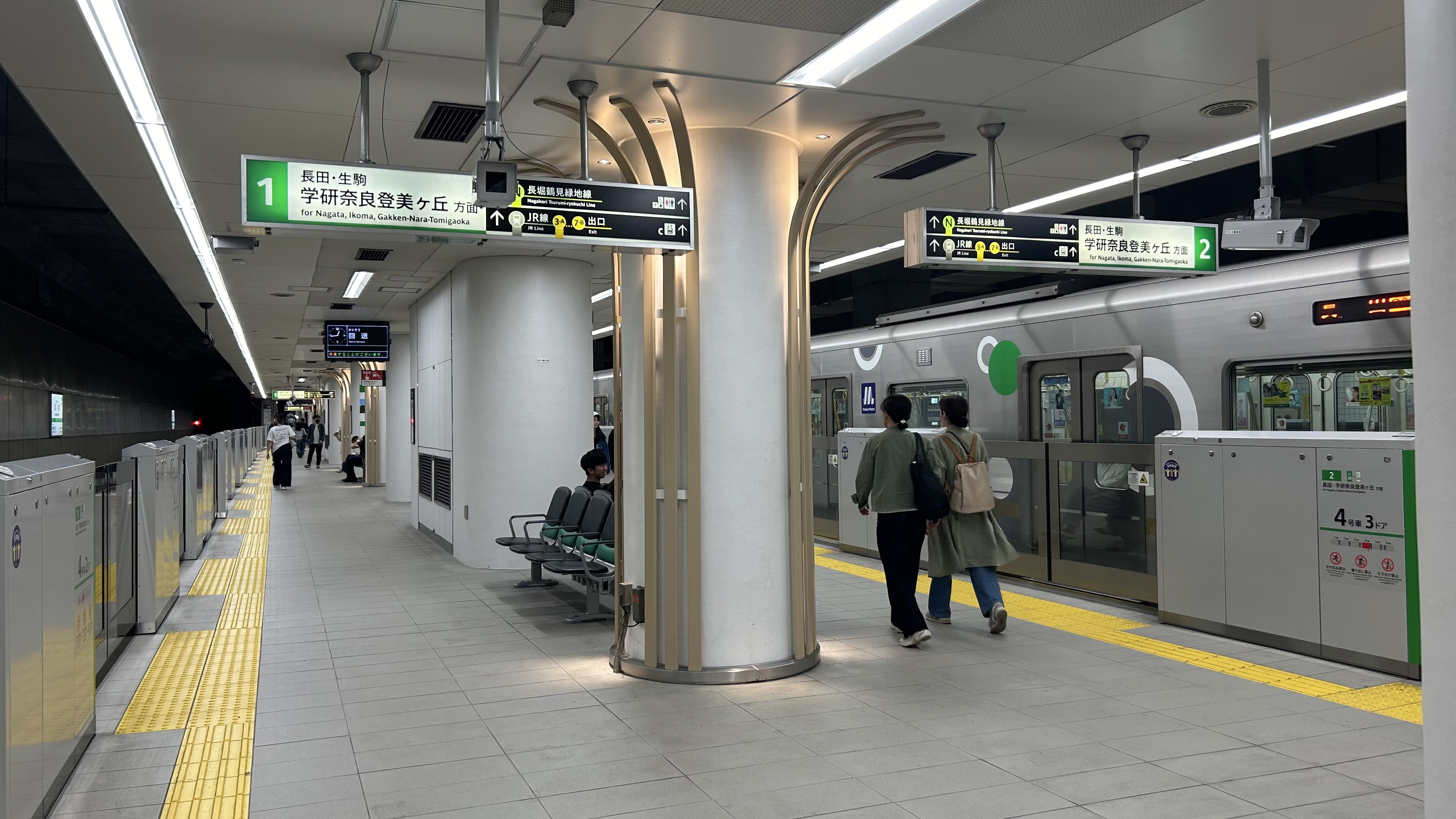
Chūō Line platform 1 and 2 in 2025

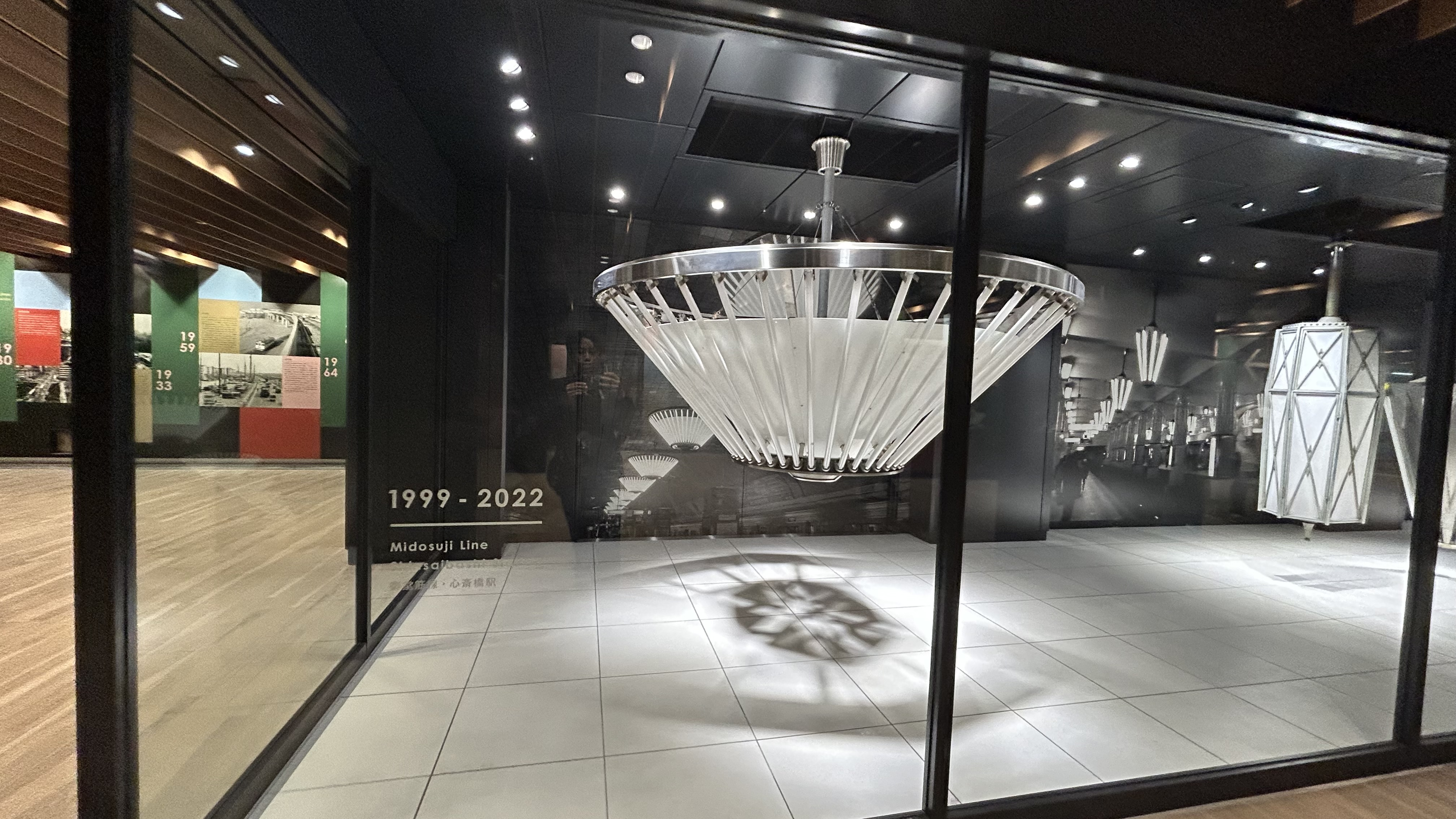
Retired lighting fixture from Shinsaibashi Station, on display in the Metro history gallery inside the western concourse

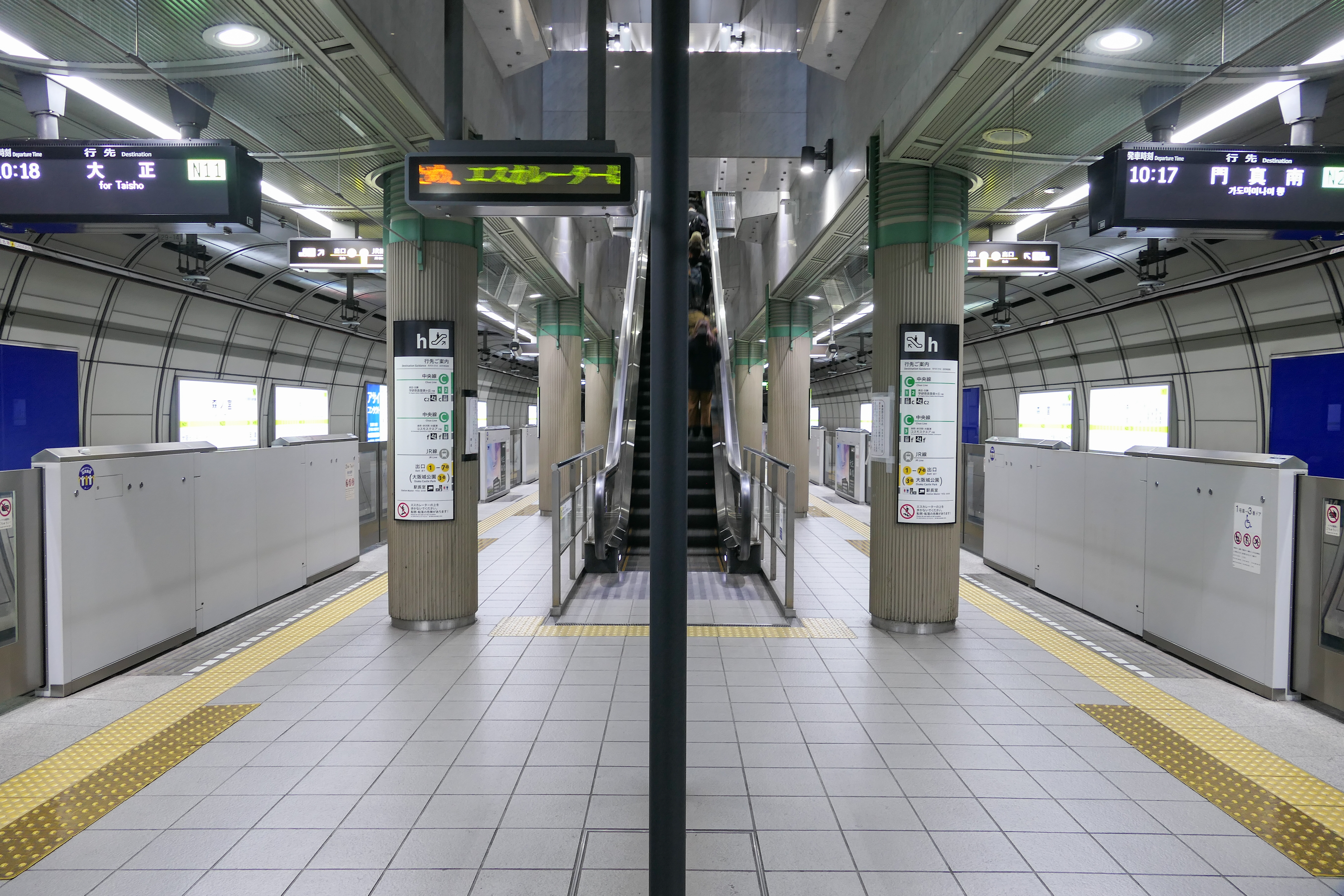
Nagahori-tsurumi-ryokuchi Line platform 1 and 2

== Around the station ==
- Osaka Castle
- JR West Morinomiya Depot
- Osaka Municipal Subway Morinomiya Depot and Workshop
- Sakura Color Products Corporation

== Adjacent stations ==
Preceding station	Osaka Metro	Following station
Tanimachi Yonchōme C 18 towards Yumeshima	Chūō Line	Midoribashi C 20 towards Nagata
Tamatsukuri N 19 towards Taishō	Nagahori Tsurumi-ryokuchi Line	Osaka Business Park N 21 towards Kadoma-minami

«	Service	»
West Japan Railway Company (JR West)
Osaka Loop Line
Tamatsukuri	All types	Osakajōkōen
