= 1997 in rail transport =

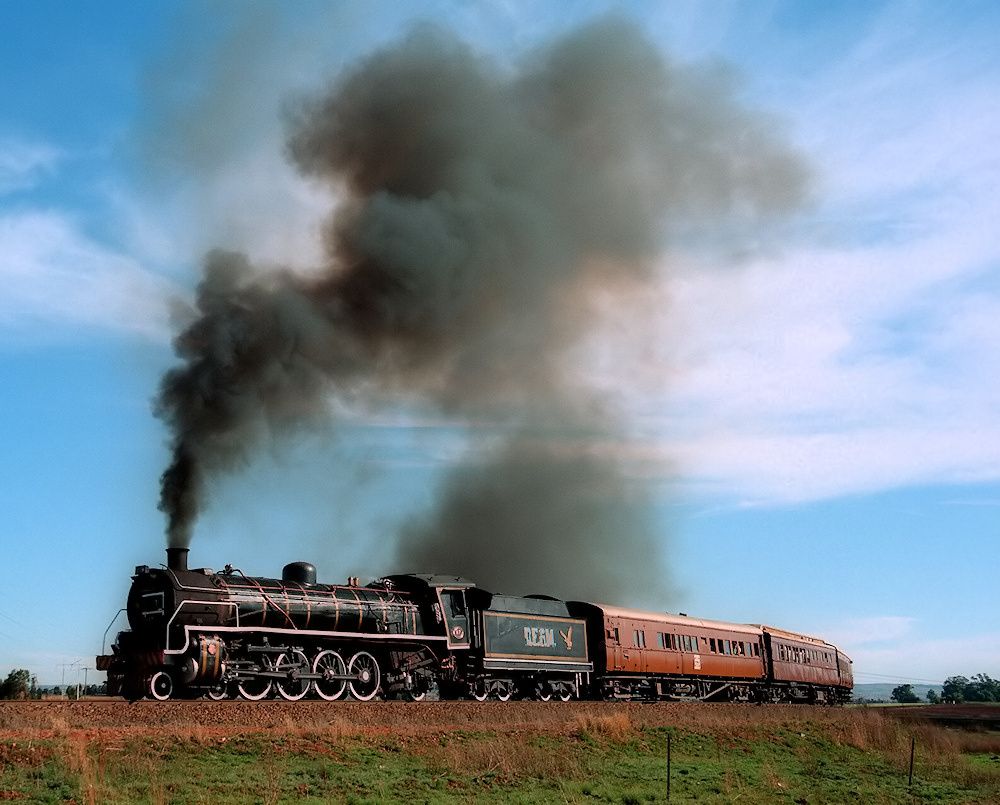
REGM's 15BR R7 is shown working a mine managers tour (c.1997)

This article lists events related to rail transport that occurred in 1997.

== Events ==
=== January events ===
- 1 January- The Missouri Pacific Railway is merged (officially) into the Union Pacific Railroad 15 years after being purchased by the company in 1982.
- 5 January – Further British train operating companies begin operation of their passenger service franchises as part of the privatisation of British Rail: Anglia Railways (GB Railways); Great Eastern (FirstGroup); Virgin CrossCountry (Virgin Rail Group) and WAGN (Prism Rail).
- 6 January – Full freight and passenger service is restored through the Channel Tunnel, just short of two months after a devastating fire.
- 19 January – British train operating company Merseyrail Electrics (MTL) begins operation of its passenger service franchise in England as part of the privatisation of British Rail.

=== March events ===
- 2 March – Further British train operating companies begin operation of their passenger service franchises in England as part of the privatisation of British Rail: Central Trains and North London Railways (both National Express); North Western Trains (Great Western Holdings); Regional Railways North East (MTL) and Thameslink (Govia).
- 3 March – Union Pacific Railroad reopens the former Western Pacific Railroad Feather River Canyon line in California after repairs are made from flooding that occurred in January.
- 8 March – Service on the JR Tōzai Line, from Kyobashi of Osaka to Amagasaki, starts in Japan.
- 9 March – British train operating company Virgin Trains West Coast (Virgin Rail Group) begins operation the InterCity West Coast franchise as part of the privatisation of British Rail.
- 22 March
  - Japan's Akita Shinkansen begins operating over the Morioka-Akita section using Tazawako Line and Ōu Main Line tracks.
  - Also in Japan, the Hokuhoku Line begins service on a new line connecting Saigata Station and Muikamachi Station in Akita and Niigata prefectures. With the line's opening, the Hakutaka limited express becomes the fastest conventional limited express service in the country at speeds of 160 km/h (99 mph) using 681 series and 683 series trainsets.
- 31 March – Train operating company ScotRail (National Express) begins operation of the ScotRail franchise in Scotland as part of the privatisation of British Rail, the last company to be privatised.

=== April events ===
- 25 April – Construction begins on Phase II of Manchester Metrolink in England.
- 27 April – Tsing Ma Bridge in Hong Kong, China is officially opened. The lower deck of this suspension bridge carries rail lines as part of MTR's Tung Chung line and Airport Express. The bridge has a main span of 1,377 metres (4,518 ft), the largest of any bridge carrying rail traffic.

=== May events ===
- 10 May
  - Amtrak ceases operations of the Chicago-Los Angeles Desert Wind passenger train.
  - Bay Area Rapid Transit opens a branch line to Dublin and Pleasanton, California.
- 11 May – The New York and Atlantic Railway takes over operations of the Long Island Rail Road's freight services.
- May – Kansas City Southern acquires the Gateway Western Railway and begins operating it as a subsidiary railroad.

=== June events ===
- 28 June – Guangzhou Metro Line 1 begins partial operation.

=== August events ===
- 27 August – Union Pacific Railroad (UP) and the United States Federal Railroad Administration (FRA) form a team composed of UP managers, union employees and FRA representatives to review safety policies and procedures across the UP system.
- 29 August – Opening of the third phase of the Osaka Rapid Electric Tramway Line No. 7 (高速電気軌道第7号線) (Nagahori Tsurumi-ryokuchi Line) between Taisho and Shinsaibashi and the fourth phase of the same line between Tsurumi-Ryokuchi and Kadoma-Minami.

=== September events ===
- 3 September
  - Union Pacific Railroad and the United States Federal Railroad Administration introduce the Safety Assurance Compliance Process.
  - Dufferin Manor, one of the Manor series sleeping cars owned by VIA Rail, is wrecked in a derailment near Biggar, Saskatchewan.
- 19 September – In the Southall rail crash, the 10:32 Great Western Trains Intercity passenger train from Swansea to London Paddington, operating with a defective Automatic Warning System indicator passes a red signal (SPAD) and collides with a freight train leaving its depot, shortly before 13:20 local time.
- 20 September – RaiLink Southern Ontario begins operations on the former Canadian National Railway Hagersville subdivision between Nanticoke and Brantford.
- 29 September - MBTA Commuter Rail reopens the Old Colony division to the Middleborough/Lakeville Line and Kingston Line

=== October events ===
- 1 October – Nagano Shinkansen, between Takasaki and Nagano route open, with Tokyo-Nagano direct bullet train to start.
- October – Helper locomotives end their operations with Asama train over Usui Pass with 66,7‰ (the Devi's Climb) uphill gradient, Japan. This service is replaced by dedicated high-speed line.
- 13 October – First section of the restored Welsh Highland Railway (60 cm (2 ft) gauge) officially opened over 5 km (3 mi) of abandoned standard gauge trackbed between Caernarfon and Dinas, Gwynedd, North Wales.
- 23 October – A coal train in Beresfield, New South Wales, Australia passes a red signal (SPAD) and collides with the rear of a second coal train on the same track in the Beresfield rail disaster; due to the accident, a random factor has been added to the vigilance control signals' intervals.

=== November events ===
- 1 November – Australian National is privatised with TasRail operations and infrastructure sold to Australian Transport Network, South Australian branch lines sold to Australian Southern Railroad (a subsidiary of Genesee & Wyoming), and passenger services to Great Southern Rail.
- 11 November – The extension of Minsk Metro's Avtozavodskaya Line connecting Traktornyi Zavod to Avtozavodskaya opens.
- 22 November – British freight company Railfreight Distribution is acquired by English Welsh & Scottish as part of the privatisation of British Rail.

=== December events ===
- December – Illinois RailNet is formed.
- 10 December – Inauguration of the 2nd and last part of the Belgian High Speed Line 1 (HSL 1 – Antoing<>Lembeek) by King Albert II.
- 14 December – Belgian High Speed Line 1 (HSL 1) put into service, reducing the travel time Brussels<>Paris to 1h25 and Brussels<>London to 2h36.
- 19 December – The Toei Oedo Line is opened from Nerima to Shinjuku in Tokyo, Japan.

== Awards ==
=== North America ===
1997 E. H. Harriman Awards

Group	Gold medal	Silver medal	Bronze medal
A	Norfolk Southern Railway		
B			
C			
S&T			

Awards presented by Railway Age magazine

- 1997 Railroader of the Year: Paul M. Tellier (CN)
- 1997 Regional Railroad of the Year: Red River Valley and Western Railroad
- 1997 Short Line Railroad of the Year: Livonia, Avon and Lakeville Railroad
