= Yokozutsumi Station =

Metro station in Osaka, Japan

Yokozutsumi Station 横堤駅
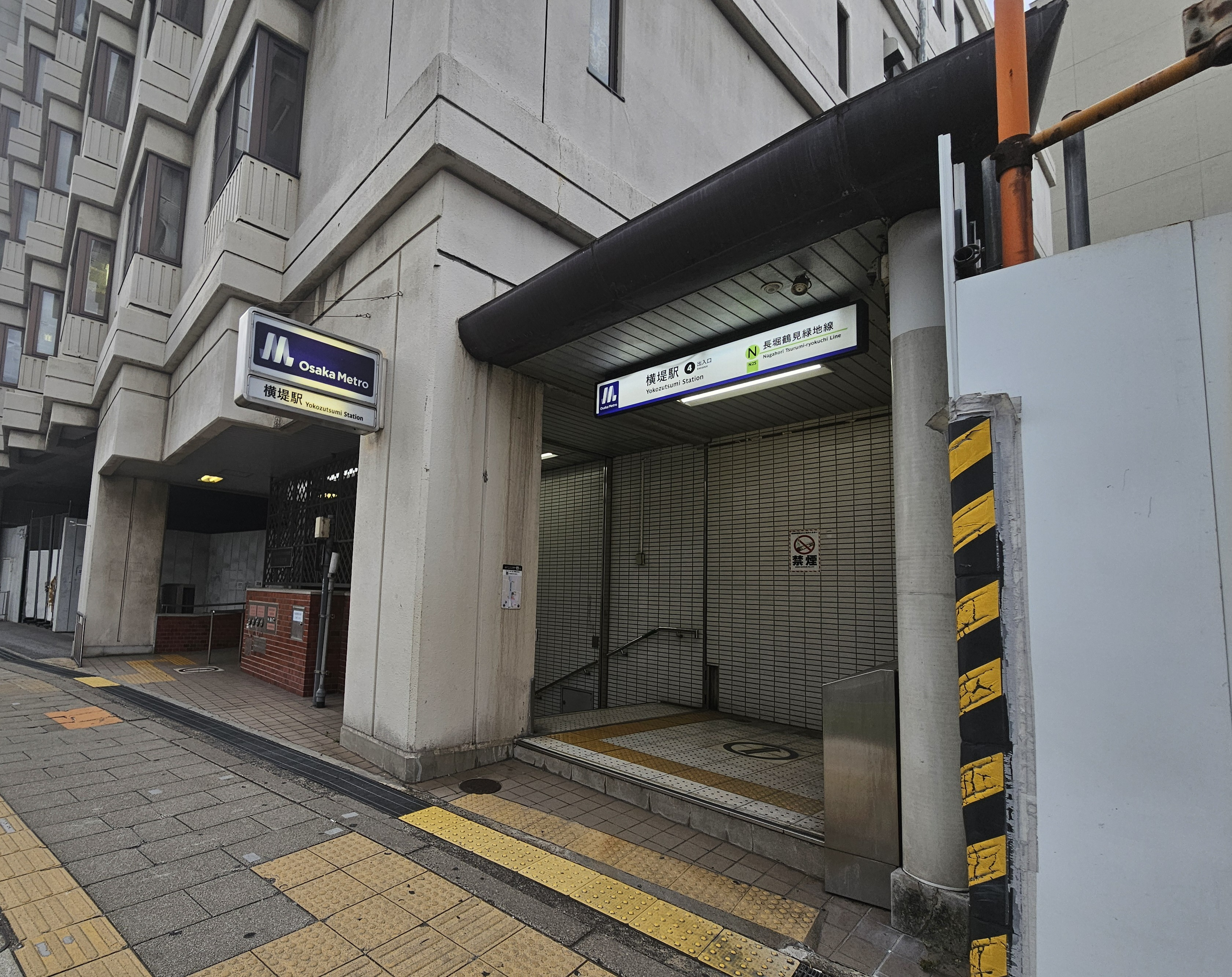
- Station entrance

General information
- Location: Yokozutsumi 5-chome, Tsurumi-ku, Osaka （大阪市鶴見区横堤5丁目） Japan
- Coordinates: 34°42′13″N 135°34′22″E
- System: Osaka Metro
- Operator: Osaka Metro
- Line: Nagahori Tsurumi-ryokuchi Line
- Distance: 12.5 km (7.8 miles) from Taisho
- Platforms: 1 side platform
- Tracks: 2

Construction
- Structure type: Underground

Other information
- Station code: N 25

History
- Opened: 20 March 1990; 36 years ago

Services
Preceding station	Osaka Metro	Following station
Imafuku-Tsurumi N 24 towards Taishō	Nagahori Tsurumi-ryokuchi Line	Tsurumi-ryokuchi N 26 towards Kadoma-minami
Location
- Location within Osaka Prefecture Location within Japan

Yokozutsumi Station (横堤駅, Yokozutsumi-eki; station number: N25) is a train station on the Osaka Metro Nagahori Tsurumi-ryokuchi Line in Yokozutsumi Gochome, Tsurumi-ku, Osaka, Japan.

== Layout ==
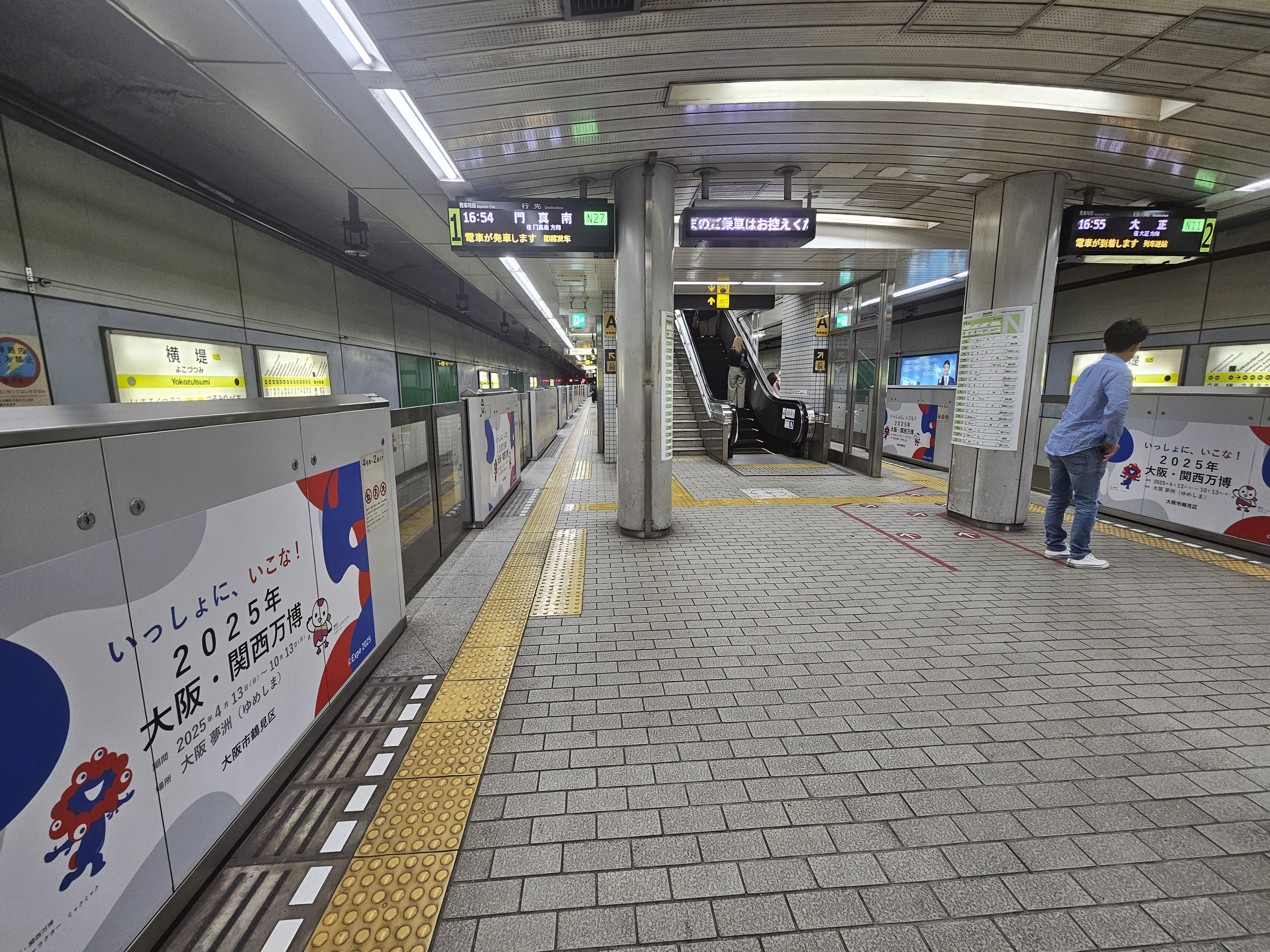
Station platform in May 2025

The station has an island platform fenced with platform gates between 2 tracks underground. Ticket gates are located at only one place.

1	■ Nagahori Tsurumi-ryokuchi Line	for Kadomaminami
2	■ Nagahori Tsurumi-ryokuchi Line	for Kyobashi, Morinomiya, Shinsaibashi and Taisho
