= Nishiōhashi Station =

Metro station in Osaka, Japan

Coordinates: 34.6753°N 135.4937°E

Nishiōhashi Station 西大橋駅
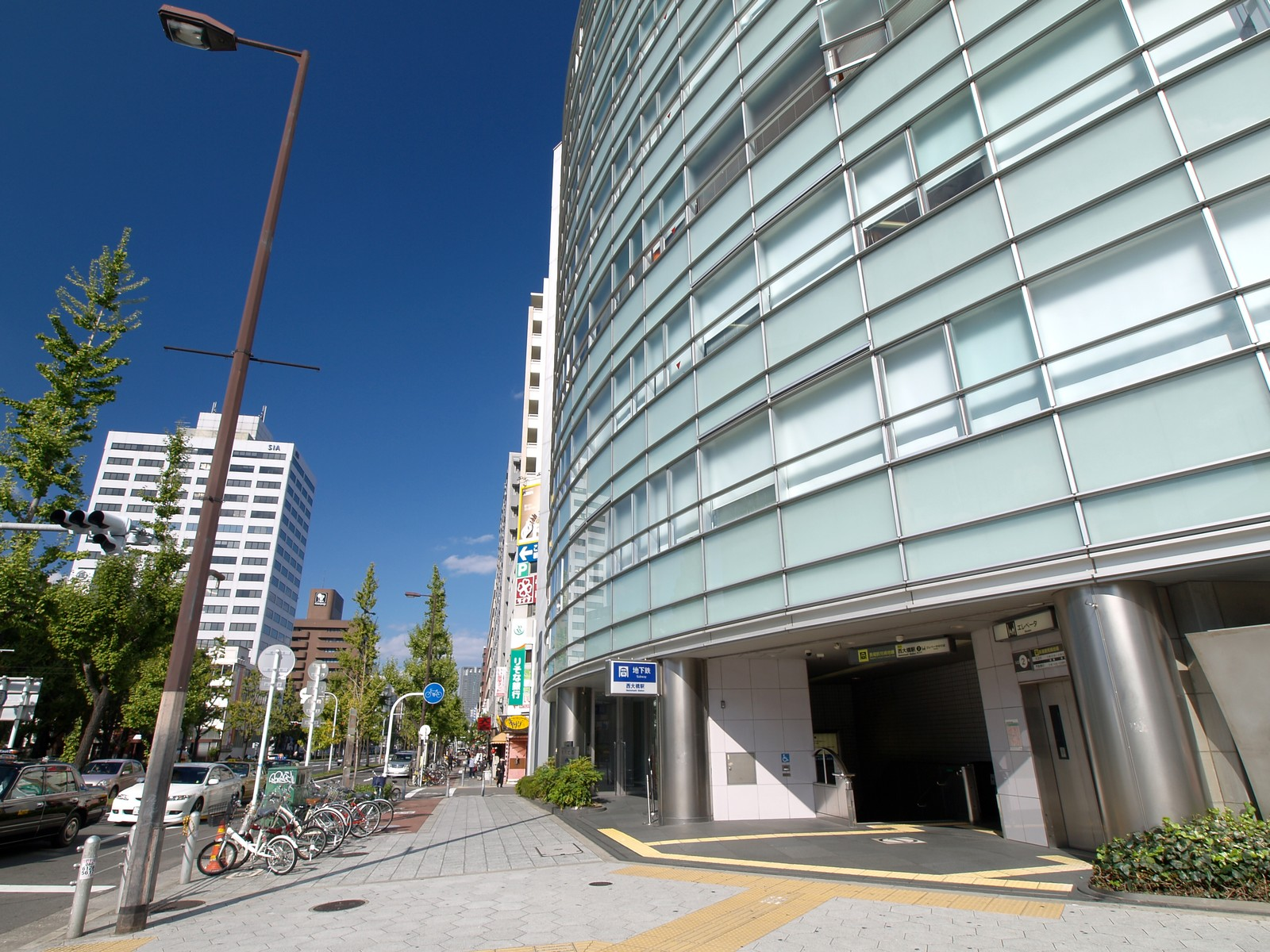
- Station entrance

General information
- Location: Japan
- System: Osaka Metro
- Operator: Osaka Metro
- Line: Nagahori Tsurumi-ryokuchi Line
- Platforms: 1 island platform
- Tracks: 2

Construction
- Structure type: Underground

Other information
- Station code: N 14

History
- Opened: 29 August 1997; 28 years ago

Services
Preceding station	Osaka Metro	Following station
Nishi-Nagahori N 13 towards Taishō	Nagahori Tsurumi-ryokuchi Line	Shinsaibashi N 15 towards Kadoma-minami
Location
- Location within Osaka Prefecture Location within Japan

Nishiohashi Station (西大橋駅, Nishiohashi-eki) is a train station on the Osaka Metro Nagahori Tsurumi-ryokuchi Line in Nishi-ku, Osaka, Japan.

== Lines ==
- Osaka Metro

- Nagahori Tsurumi-ryokuchi Line (Station Number: N14)

== Layout ==
=== Nagahori Tsurumi-ryokuchi Line ===
1	■ Nagahori Tsurumi-ryokuchi Line	for Shinsaibashi, Morinomiya, Kyobashi and Kadomaminami
2	■ Nagahori Tsurumi-ryokuchi Line	to Dome-mae Chiyozaki and Taisho
