= Imafuku-Tsurumi Station =

Metro station in Osaka, Japan

Coordinates: 34.7018°N 135.5600°E

Imafuku-Tsurumi 今福鶴見
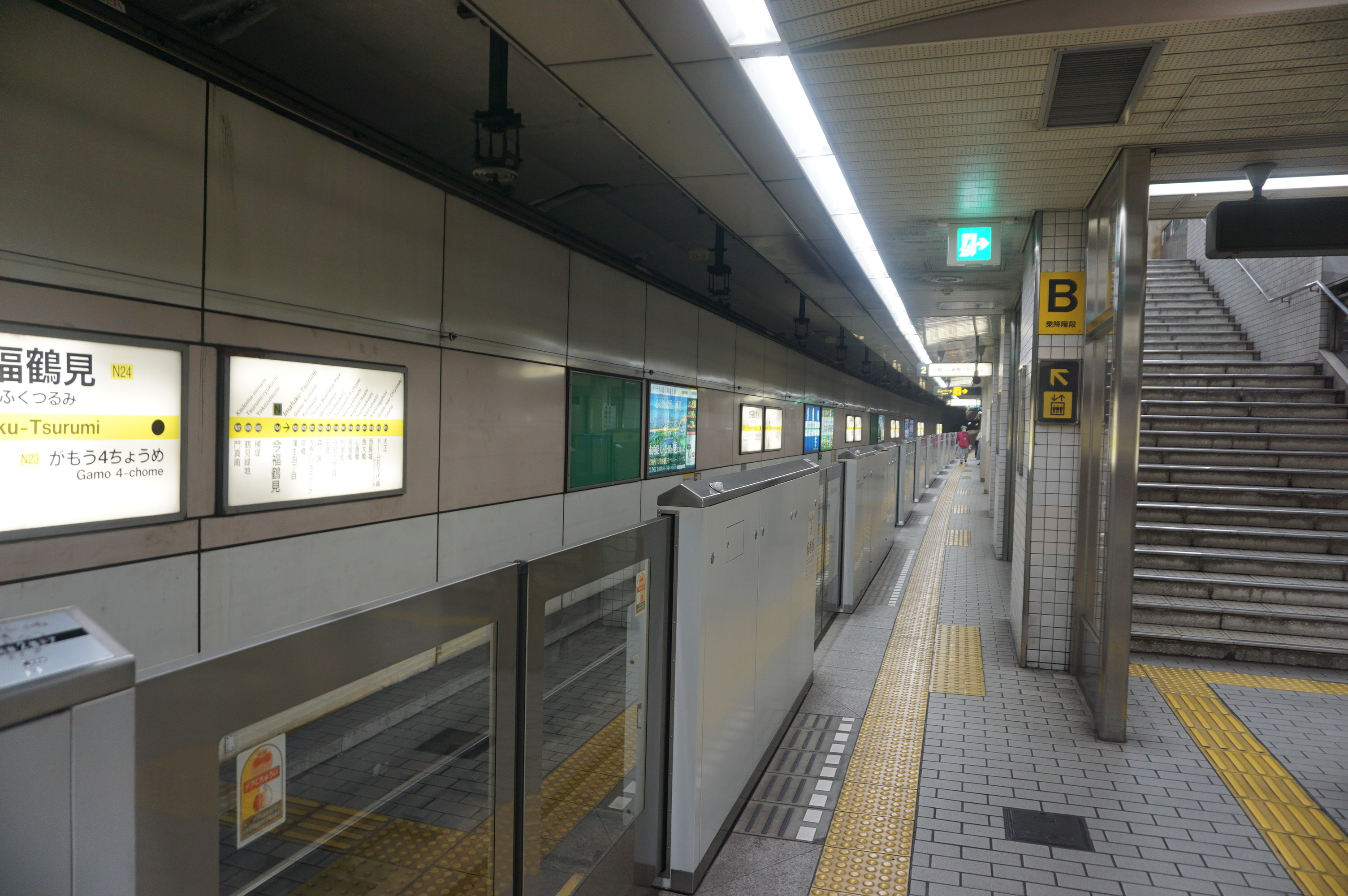

General information
- Location: Japan
- System: Osaka Metro
- Operator: Osaka Metro
- Line: Nagahori Tsurumi-ryokuchi Line
- Platforms: 1 island platform
- Tracks: 2

Construction
- Structure type: Underground

Other information
- Station code: N 24

History
- Opened: 20 March 1990; 36 years ago

Services
Preceding station	Osaka Metro	Following station
Gamō-yonchōme N 23 towards Taishō	Nagahori Tsurumi-ryokuchi Line	Yokozutsumi N 25 towards Kadoma-minami
Location
- Location within Osaka Prefecture Location within Japan

== Layout ==
- There is an island platform fenced with platform gates between two tracks underground.

1	■ Nagahori Tsurumi-ryokuchi Line	for Kadomaminami
2	■ Nagahori Tsurumi-ryokuchi Line	for Kyobashi, Morinomiya, Shinsaibashi and Taisho
