= Nishi-Nagahori Station =

Metro station in Osaka, Japan

Nishi-Nagahori Station 西長堀駅
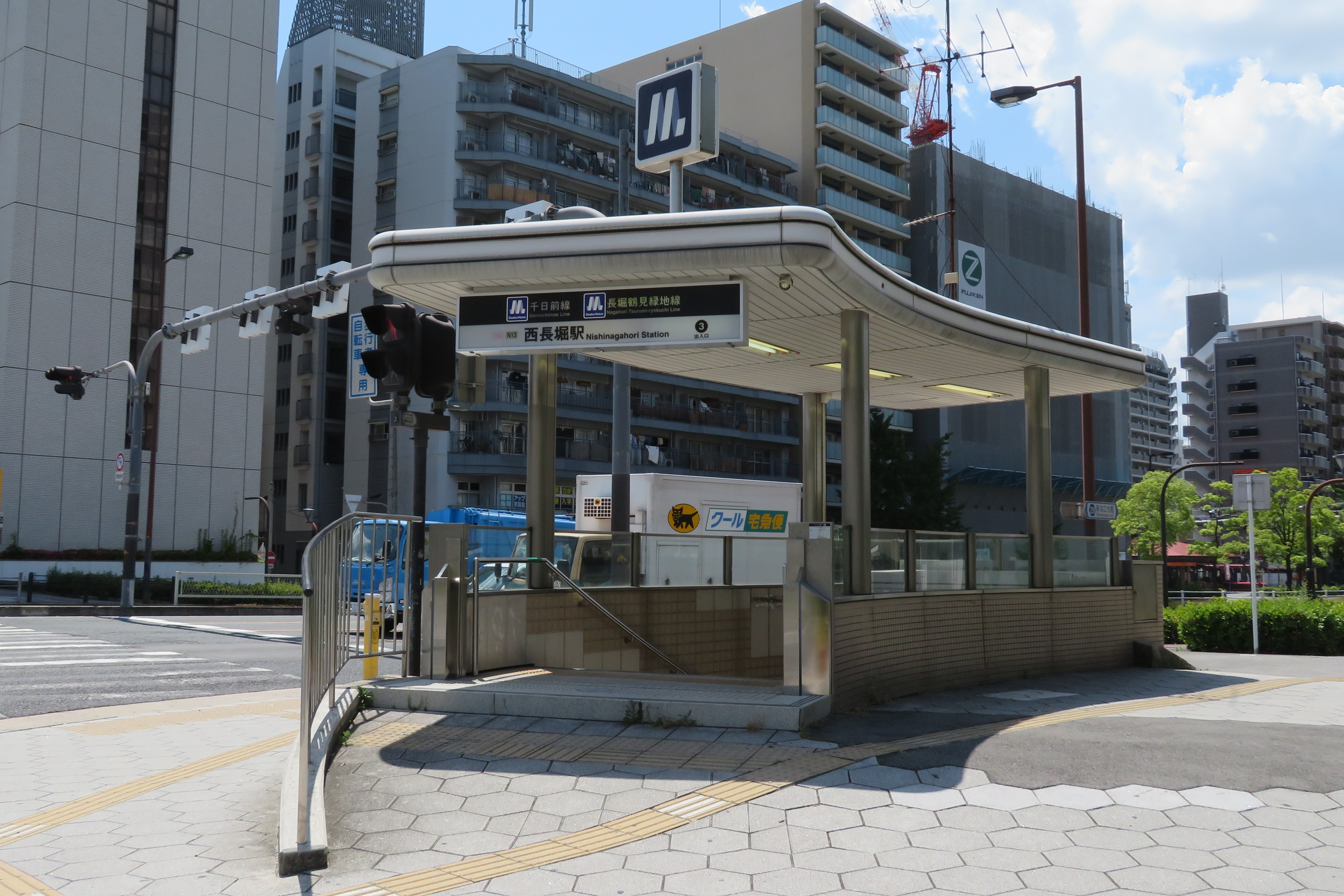
- Station entrance

General information
- Location: 12-20, Kita-Horie 3-chome, Nishi, Osaka, Osaka （大阪市西区北堀江三丁目12-20） Japan
- Coordinates: 34°40′32″N 135°29′14″E
- System: Osaka Metro
- Operator: Osaka Metro
- Lines: Nagahori Tsurumi-ryokuchi Line; Sennichimae Line
- Platforms: 2 side platforms (Sennichimae Line); 1 island platform (Nagahori Tsurumi-ryokuchi Line)
- Tracks: 4 (2 on each level)
- Connections: Bus stop

Other information
- Station code: N 13 S 14

History
- Opened: 16 April 1969 (Sennichimae Line); 1997 (Nagahori Tsurumi-ryokuchi Line)

Services
Preceding station	Osaka Metro	Following station
Dome-mae Chiyozaki N 12 towards Taishō	Nagahori Tsurumi-ryokuchi Line	Nishiōhashi N 14 towards Kadoma-minami
Awaza S 13 towards Nodahanshin	Sennichimae Line	Sakuragawa S 15 towards Minami-Tatsumi
Location
- Location within Osaka Prefecture Location within Japan

Nishi-Nagahori Station (西長堀駅, Nishi-Nagahori-eki) is a railway station on the Osaka Metro Nagahori Tsurumi-ryokuchi Line and Sennichimae Line in Nishi-ku, Osaka, Japan.

== Lines ==
- Osaka Metro

- Nagahori Tsurumi-ryokuchi Line (Station Number: N13)
- Sennichimae Line (Station Number: S14)

== Layout ==
=== Sennichimae Line ===
1	■ Sennichimae Line	for Namba, Tsuruhashi and Minami-Tatsumi
2	■ Sennichimae Line	for Awaza and Nodahanshin

=== Nagahori Tsurumi-ryokuchi Line ===
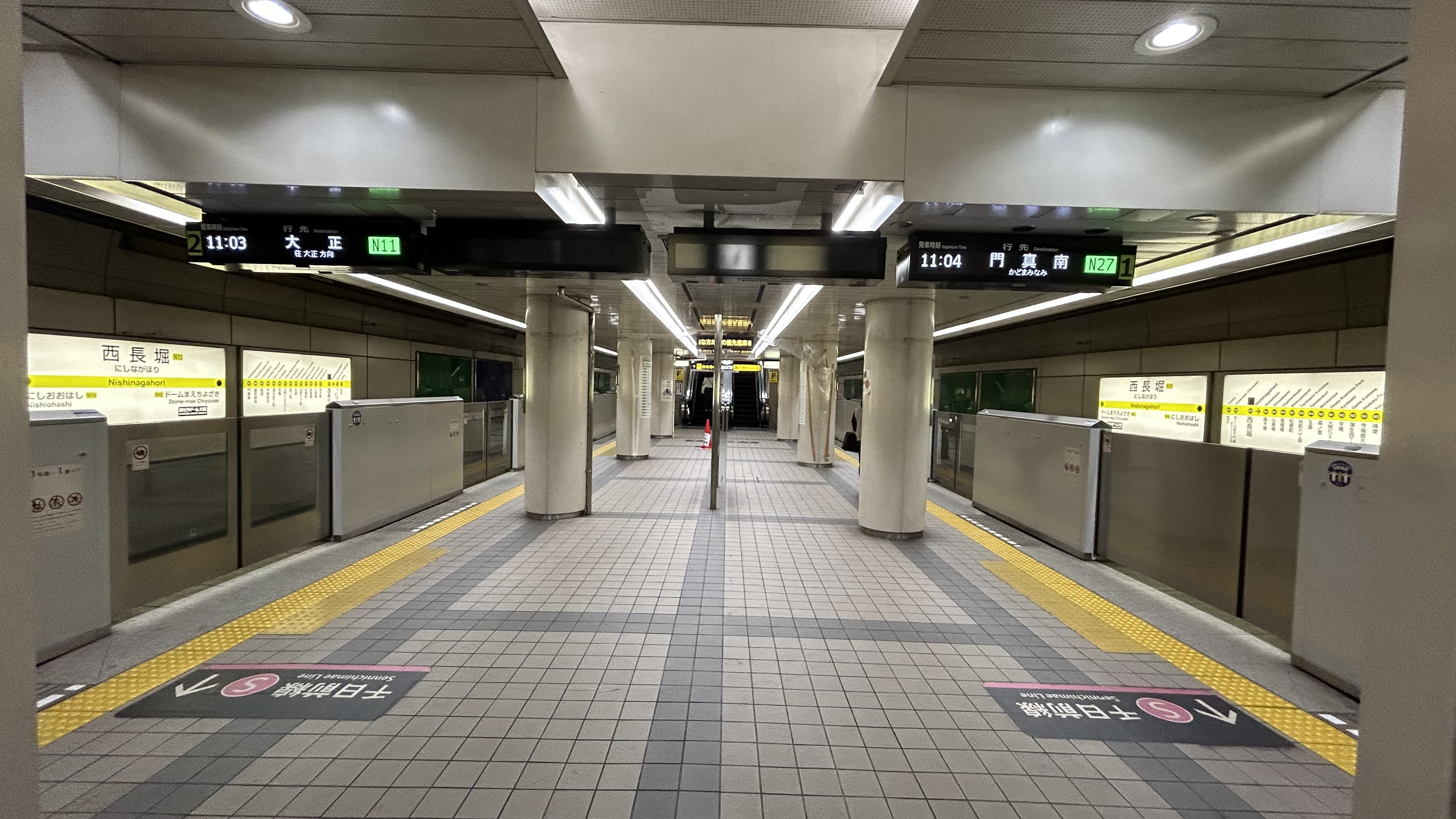
Nagahori Tsurumi-ryokuchi Line platform

1	■ Nagahori Tsurumi-ryokuchi Line	for Shinsaibashi, Kyobashi and Kadomaminami
2	■ Nagahori Tsurumi-ryokuchi Line	for Taisho
