= Osaka Business Park Station =

Metro station in Osaka, Japan

Coordinates: 34°41′32″N 135°31′47″E

Osaka Business Park Station 大阪ビジネスパーク駅
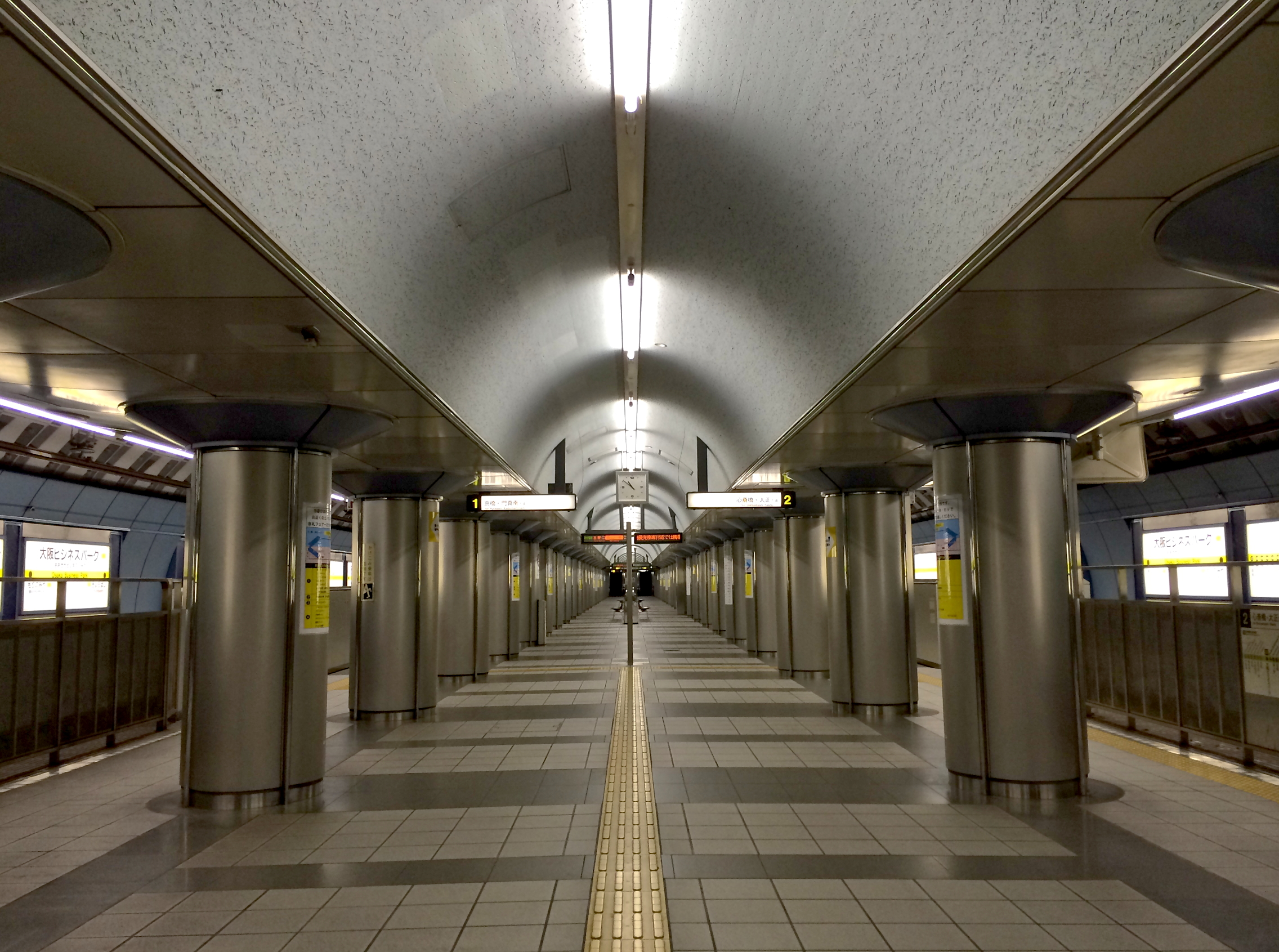
- Platform of the station

General information
- System: Osaka Metro
- Operator: Osaka Metro
- Line: Nagahori Tsurumi-ryokuchi Line
- Platforms: 1 island platform
- Tracks: 2

Construction
- Structure type: Underground
- Depth: 32.3 m (106 ft)

Other information
- Station code: N 21

History
- Opened: 11 December 1996; 29 years ago

Services
Preceding station	Osaka Metro	Following station
Morinomiya N 20 towards Taishō	Nagahori Tsurumi-ryokuchi Line	Kyōbashi N 22 towards Kadoma-minami
Location
- Location within Osaka Prefecture Location within Japan

Osaka Business Park Station (大阪ビジネスパーク駅, Ōsaka Bijinesu Pāku-eki) is a metro station on the Osaka Metro Nagahori Tsurumi-ryokuchi Line in Chūō-ku, Osaka, Japan. With a depth of 32.3 m (106 ft), it is the deepest station in the Osaka subway system.

== Line ==
- Osaka Metro Nagahori Tsurumi-ryokuchi Line (Station Number: N21)

== Layout ==
There is an island platform fenced with platform gates between 2 tracks underground.

Originally, the plan was to use prebuilt platforms located at the first basement level. However, due to its location adjacent to the nearby Neyagawa and Daini Neyagawa rivers, the city ordered the construction of the current platforms to be at least 10 m (33 ft) below the nearby rivers. The original platforms remain in place, albeit accessible only through the side of an existing staircase.

1	■ Nagahori Tsurumi-ryokuchi Line	for Kyobashi and Kadomaminami
2	■ Nagahori Tsurumi-ryokuchi Line	for Morinomiya, Shinsaibashi and Taisho

== Surroundings ==
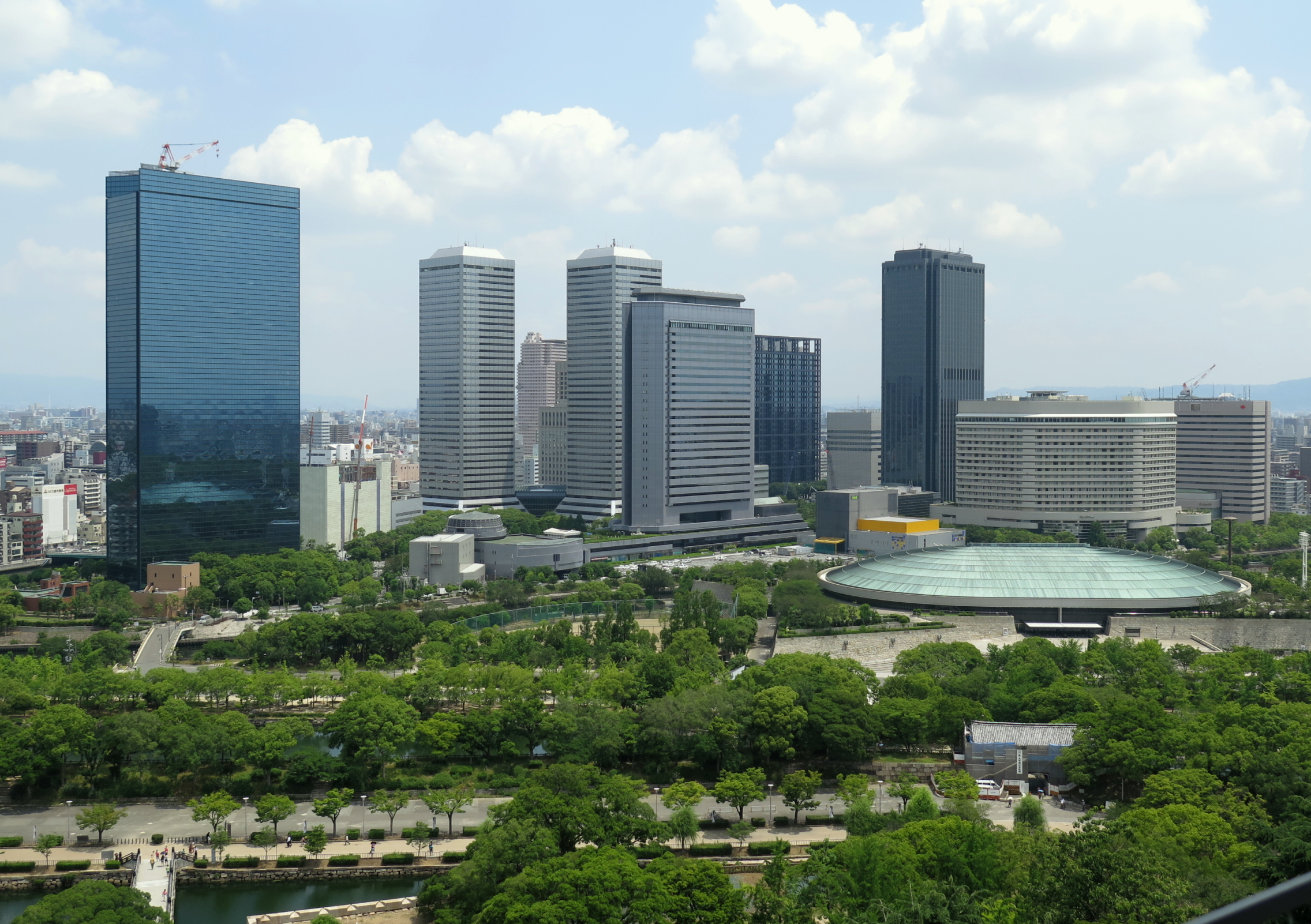
Osaka Business Park

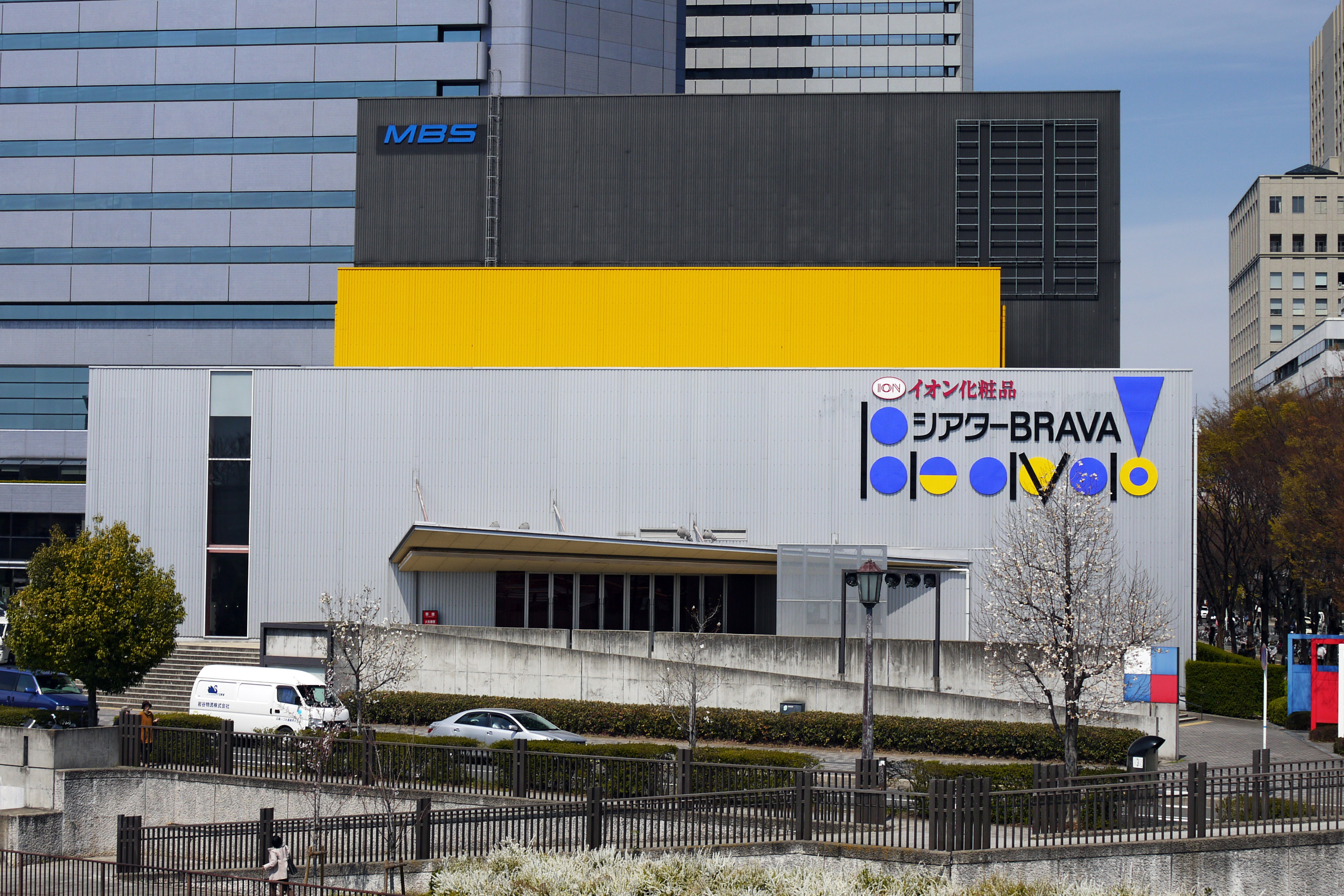
Theater BRAVA

- Osaka Business Park
  - TWIN 21
  - Fujitsu Kansai System Laboratory
  - the headquarters of Yomiuri Telecasting Corporation
  - Hotel New Otani Osaka
  - the headquarters of Sumitomo Life Insurance Company
  - Matsushita IMP Building
  - Crystal Tower
  - Castle Tower Building
  - Theater BRAVA
  - KDDI Osaka Building, etc.
- Osaka-jo Hall
- Osaka Castle
