= Dome-mae Chiyozaki Station =

Railway and metro station in Osaka, Japan

Dome-mae Chiyozaki Station ドーム前千代崎駅
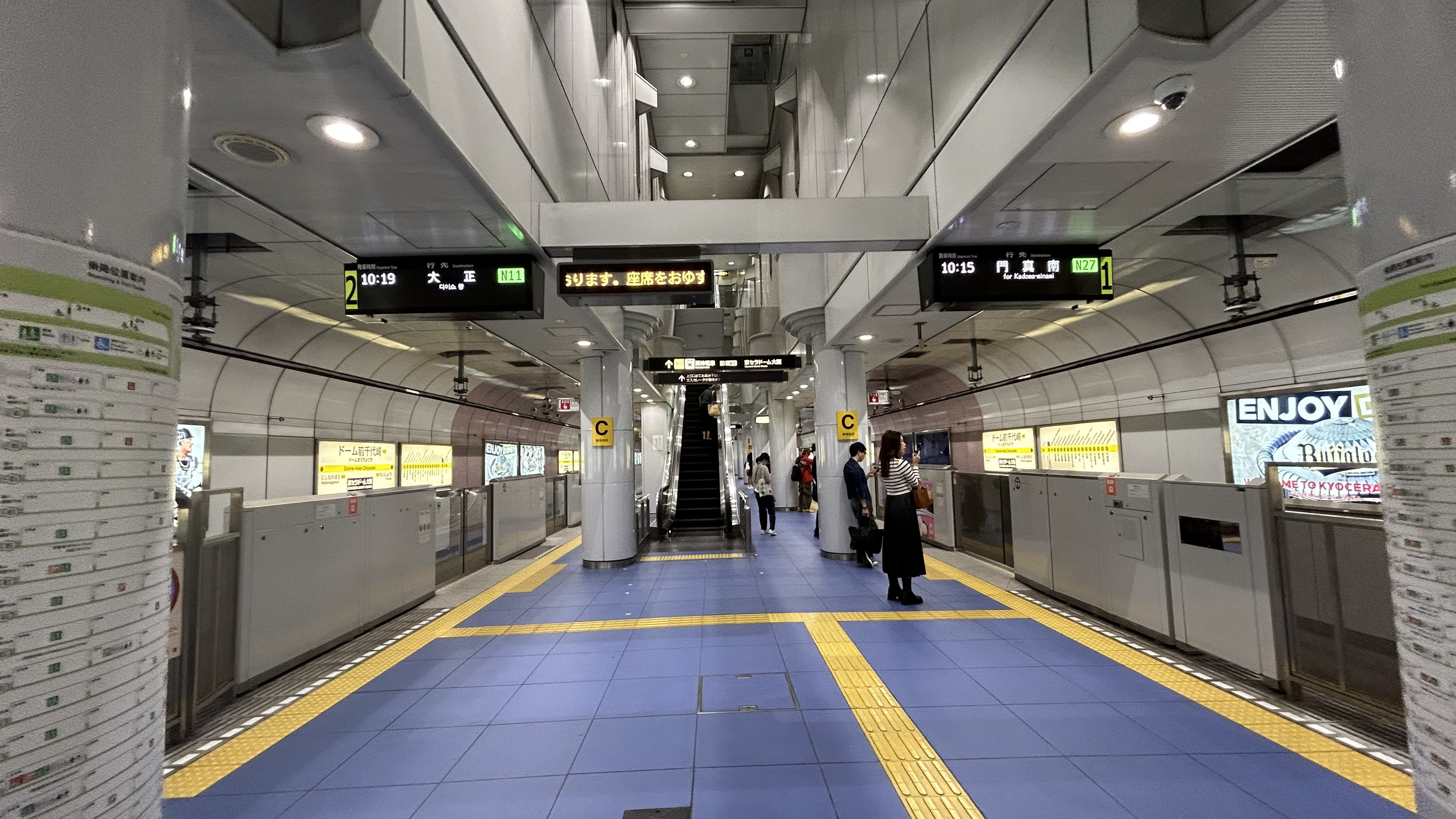
- Station platform

General information
- Location: Chiyozaki Sanchome, Nishi, Osaka, Osaka （大阪市西区千代崎三丁目） Japan
- Coordinates: 34°40′14.77″N 135°28′45.79″E
- System: Rail station
- Operator: Osaka Metro; Hanshin Electric Railway Co., Ltd.
- Lines: Nagahori Tsurumi-ryokuchi Line; Hanshin Namba Line

Other information
- Station code: N 12 HS 43 (Hanshin)

History
- Opened: August 29, 1997 (Osaka Metro), 2009 (Hanshin)
- Former names: Osaka Dome-mae Chiyozaki (until 2006)

Services
Preceding station	Osaka Metro	Following station
Taishō N 11 Terminus	Nagahori Tsurumi-ryokuchi Line	Nishi-Nagahori N 13 towards Kadoma-minami
Location
- Location within Osaka Prefecture Location within Japan

Dome-mae Chiyozaki Station (ドーム前千代崎駅, Dōmu-mae Chiyozaki-eki) is a railway station and metro station on the Osaka Metro Nagahori Tsurumi-ryokuchi Line in Nishi-ku, Osaka, Japan. The station has the secondary station name Kyocera Dome Osaka.

Dome-mae Station (ドーム前駅, Dōmu-mae eki) is also a nearby station on the Hanshin Electric Railway Hanshin Namba Line near Dome-mae Chiyozaki Station.

== Lines ==
- Osaka Metro Nagahori Tsurumi-ryokuchi Line (N12: Dome-mae Chiyozaki Station)
- Hanshin Electric Railway Hanshin Namba Line (HS 43: Dome-mae Station)

== Layout ==
=== Dome-mae Chiyozaki Station (Osaka Metro) ===
The station has an island platform serving 2 tracks on the 4th basement and the platform is equipped with platform gates. On the 2nd basement, there are extra ticket machines on the opposite side of the ticket gates for the events at Osaka Dome (Kyocera Dome Osaka).

1	■ Nagahori Tsurumi-ryokuchi Line	for Shinsaibashi, Morinomiya, Kyobashi and Kadomaminami
2	■ Nagahori Tsurumi-ryokuchi Line	to Taisho

=== Dome-mae Station (Hanshin Railway) ===
This station has 5 levels underground in order to take passengers from Osaka Dome (Kyocera Dome Osaka) smoothly. The 2nd basement functions as the ticket gate area and the 5th basement contains an island platform serving two tracks. Approximately 160 thousand bricks are used for the wall of the platform and tracks because there was formerly an Osaka Gas factory near this station which was made out of bricks. The passage to ÆON Mall Osaka Dome City is located in front of the ticket gates.

1	■ Hanshin Namba Line	for Ōsaka Namba and Nara
2	■ Hanshin Namba Line	for Amagasaki, Koshien and Kobe Sannomiya; Change trains at Amagasaki or Kobe Sannnomiya for Akashi and Himeji

== History ==
- August 29, 1997: Osaka Dome-mae Chiyozaki Station (大阪ドーム前千代崎駅, Ōsaka-Dōmu-mae-Chiyozaki eki) on the Osaka Municipal Subway Nagahori Tsurumi-ryokuchi Line was opened for the extension of the line from Shinsaibashi to Taisho.
- December 24, 2006: Osaka Dome-mae Chiyozaki Station was renamed Dome-mae Chiyozaki Station on the same day the Imazatosuji Line was opened.
- March 20, 2009: Dome-mae Station was opened for the opening of the Hanshin Railway Hanshin Namba Line.
- August 28, 2010: The platform gates became in use on the platform of Dome-mae Chiyozaki Station.

== Surroundings ==
- Osaka Dome (July 1, 2006–: Kyocera Dome Osaka)
- Osaka Metro Co., Ltd. / Osaka City Bus Corporation
- Osaka Municipal Fire Department, Nishi Fire Station
- Osaka Gas Dome City Gas Building
- Foleo Osaka Dome City
- ÆON Mall Osaka Dome City

=== Buses ===
Dome-mae Chiyozaki (Osaka City Bus Corporation)
- Route 51 for Tempozan via Bentencho-ekimae and Daisan Tottei-mae
- Route 70 for Nishi-Funamachi via Taisho Kuyakusho-mae (ward office)
- Route 70 Express for Nishi-Funamachi via Taisho Kuyakusho-mae (ward office)
- Route 76 for Subway Suminoekoen
- Route 90 for Nodahanshin-mae / for Tsurumachi Yonchome via Taisho Kuyakusho-mae (ward office)
- Route 91 for Tsurumachi Yonchome via Taisho Kuyakusho-mae (ward office)
- Route 91 Express for Tsurumachi Yonchome via Taisho Kuyakusho-mae (ward office)
- Route 94 for Tsurumachi Yonchome via Chishima Koen-mae
- Route 98 for Taisho Kuyakusho-mae (ward office) via Shin-Chitose

Preceding station	Osaka Metro	Following station
Taishō N 11 Terminus	Nagahori Tsurumi-ryokuchi Line	Nishi-Nagahori N 13 towards Kadoma-minami

«	Service	»
Hanshin Railway (HS 43: Dome-mae)
Hanshin Namba Line
Kujo (HS 44)	Local	Sakuragawa (HS 42)
Kujo (HS 44)	Semi-Express; Suburban Semi-Express	Sakuragawa (HS 42)
Kujo (HS 44)	Rapid Express	Sakuragawa (HS 42)
