= Tsurumi-ryokuchi Station =

Metro station in Osaka, Japan

Tsurumi-ryokuchi Station 鶴見緑地駅
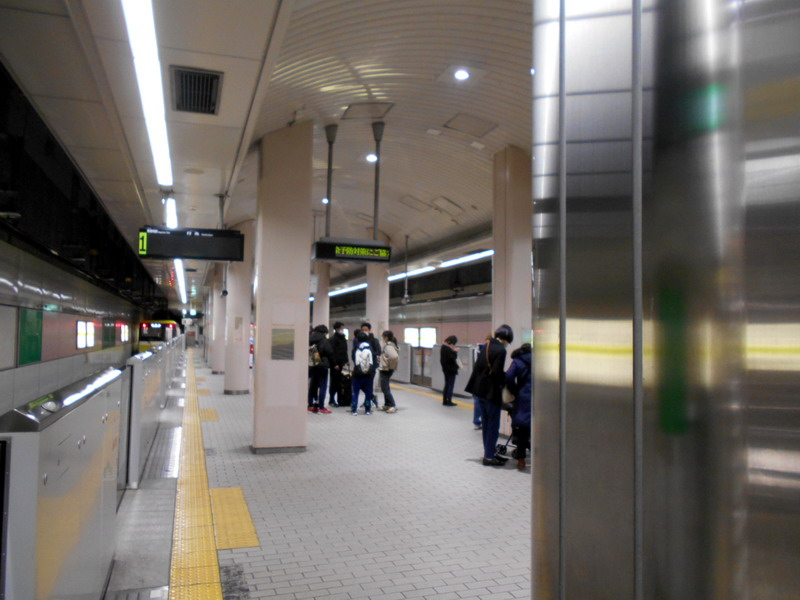

General information
- Location: Ryokuchikoen, Tsurumi-ku, Osaka （大阪市鶴見区緑地公園） Japan
- Coordinates: 34°42′39″N 135°34′49″E
- System: Osaka Metro
- Operator: Osaka Metro
- Line: Nagahori Tsurumi-ryokuchi Line
- Distance: 13.7 km (8.5 miles) from Taisho
- Platforms: 1 island platform
- Tracks: 2

Construction
- Structure type: Underground

Other information
- Station code: N 26

History
- Opened: 20 March 1990; 36 years ago

Services
Preceding station	Osaka Metro	Following station
Yokozutsumi N 25 towards Taishō	Nagahori Tsurumi-ryokuchi Line	Kadoma-minami N 27 Terminus
Location
- Location within Osaka Prefecture Location within Japan

Tsurumi-ryokuchi Station (鶴見緑地駅, Tsurumi-ryokuchi-eki; Station Number: N26) is a train station on the Osaka Metro Nagahori Tsurumi-ryokuchi Line in Tsurumi-ku, Osaka, Japan. It is the easternmost railway station in the city of Osaka.

== History ==
The station and line were opened on March 20, 1990 to provide access to Tsurumi-ryokuchi Park during the International Garden and Greenery Exposition. During the six-month exposition, the station handled 8.7 million disembarkations and 9.4 million embarkations. It was the eastern terminus of the line until 1997, when an extension to Kadoma-minami Station opened.

== Layout ==
- There is an island platform fenced with platform gates between two tracks underground.
- The station is designed around a tulip motif, as the tulip is the official flower of Tsurumi Ward and was a symbol of the 1990 Expo.

1	■ Nagahori Tsurumi-ryokuchi Line	to Kadomaminami
2	■ Nagahori Tsurumi-ryokuchi Line	for Kyobashi, Morinomiya, Shinsaibashi and Taisho

== Surroundings ==
- Tsurumi Ryokuchi Park
  - Sakuya Konohana Kan
- Osaka Metro Tsurumi Inspection Depot and Workshop
