= Expo '90 =

International gardening exposition held in Tsurumi Ryokuchi, Osaka

EXPO 1990 Osaka

Overview
- BIE-class: Horticultural exposition
- Name: Expo '90
- Motto: The Harmonious Coexistence of Nature and Mankind
- Area: 346 acres
- Visitors: 23,126,934
- Mascot: "Hanazukin-chan"

Participant(s)
- Countries: 83
- Organizations: 55

Location
- Country: Japan
- City: Osaka
- Venue: Tsurumi Ryokuchi Park
- Coordinates: 34°42′43.8″N 135°34′27″E

Timeline
- Awarded: June 5, 1986
- Opening: April 1, 1990
- Closure: September 30, 1990

Horticultural expositions
- Previous: International Garden Festival in Liverpool
- Next: 1992 Floriade in Zoetermeer

Specialized expositions
- Previous: World Expo 88 in Brisbane
- Next: Genoa Expo '92 in Genoa

Universal expositions
- Previous: Expo '70 in Osaka
- Next: Seville Expo '92 in Seville

Expo '90 (国際花と緑の博覧会, Kokusai Hana to Midori no Hakurankai), formally The International Garden and Greenery Exposition, was the first large-scale international horticultural exposition in Asia. Organized as a part of the International Expositions Convention, it focused on the theme of the "Harmonious Coexistence of Nature and Mankind." The exposition was held in Tsurumi Ryokuchi, Osaka for 183 days, from Sunday, April 1 to Sunday, September 30, 1990. The convention attracted 23,126,934 visitors. One of its main activities was to establish the annual International Cosmos Prize. It was recognized by both the Bureau International des Expositions (BIE) and the International Association of Horticultural Producers.

== Background ==
Osaka had previously hosted Expo '70.

The 99th General Assembly of the BIE recognized the Expo on 4 June 1986. The Japanese government invited 164 countries and 61 international organizations to participate; ultimately 83 countries and 55 international organizations participated, setting a record. 212 companies and organizations exhibited at the Expo.

The opening ceremony was conducted by Crown Prince Naruhito.

== Venue ==
The event took place on a 140 ha former industrial site 8 km east of central Osaka, divided into a Mountain Area, Field Area, and City Area. The Field Area featured a lake called the Sea of Life, and a 90 m tall Tower of Life. The Tower of Life alone attracted 1.2 million visitors during the Expo.

The venue featured a miniature steam locomotive, the world's first electromagnetic belt conveyor train, and a cable car. On the second day of the Expo, the "Water Ride," an elevated boat ride, suffered an accident in which two of the boats fell from the elevated waterway. This and other incidents led to the event being dubbed an "Accident Expo."

The Nagahori Tsurumi-ryokuchi Line of the Osaka Metro was built to connect the Expo site to Kyobashi Station. It was the first operational linear motor train in Japan.

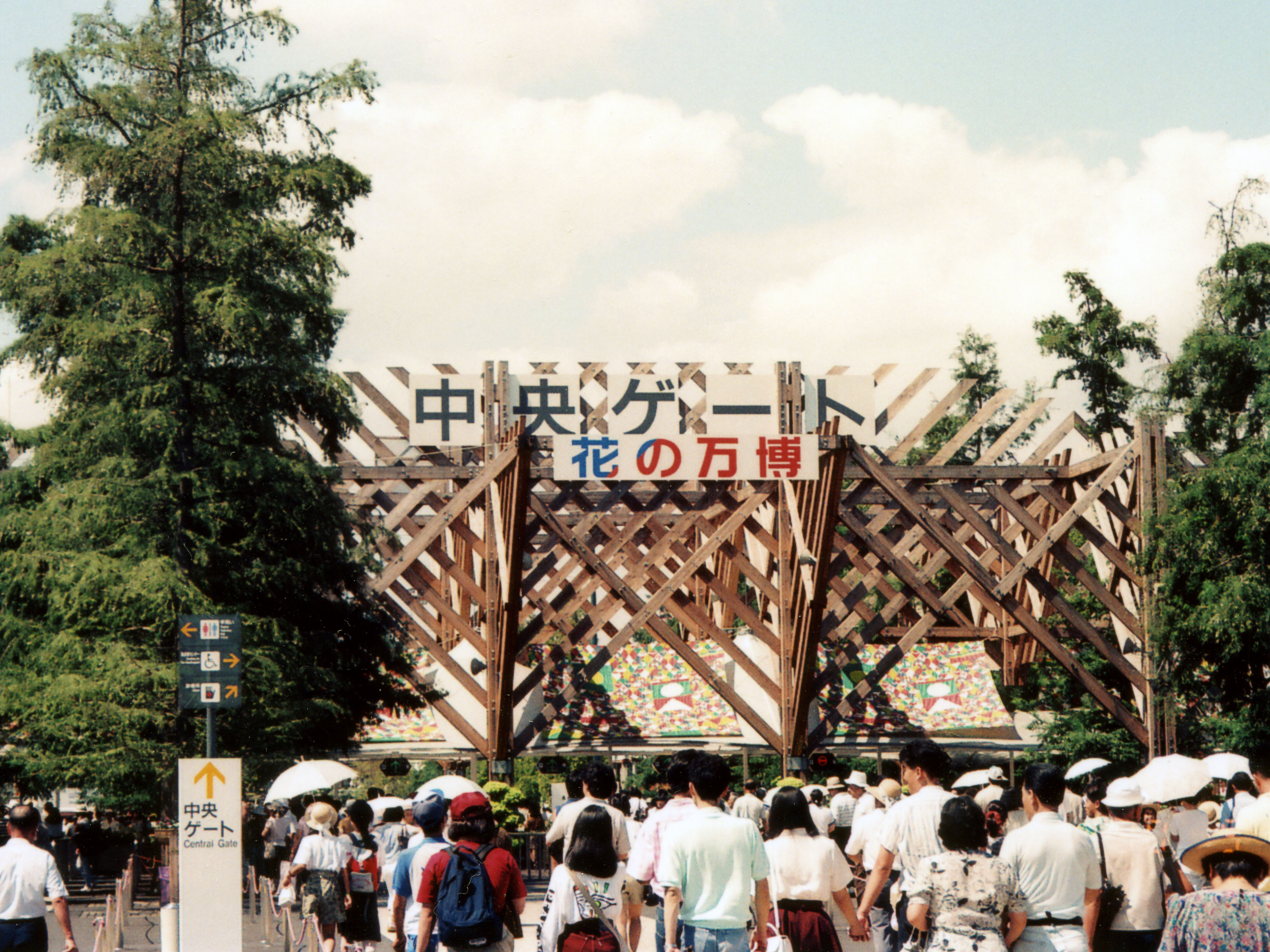
Central gate

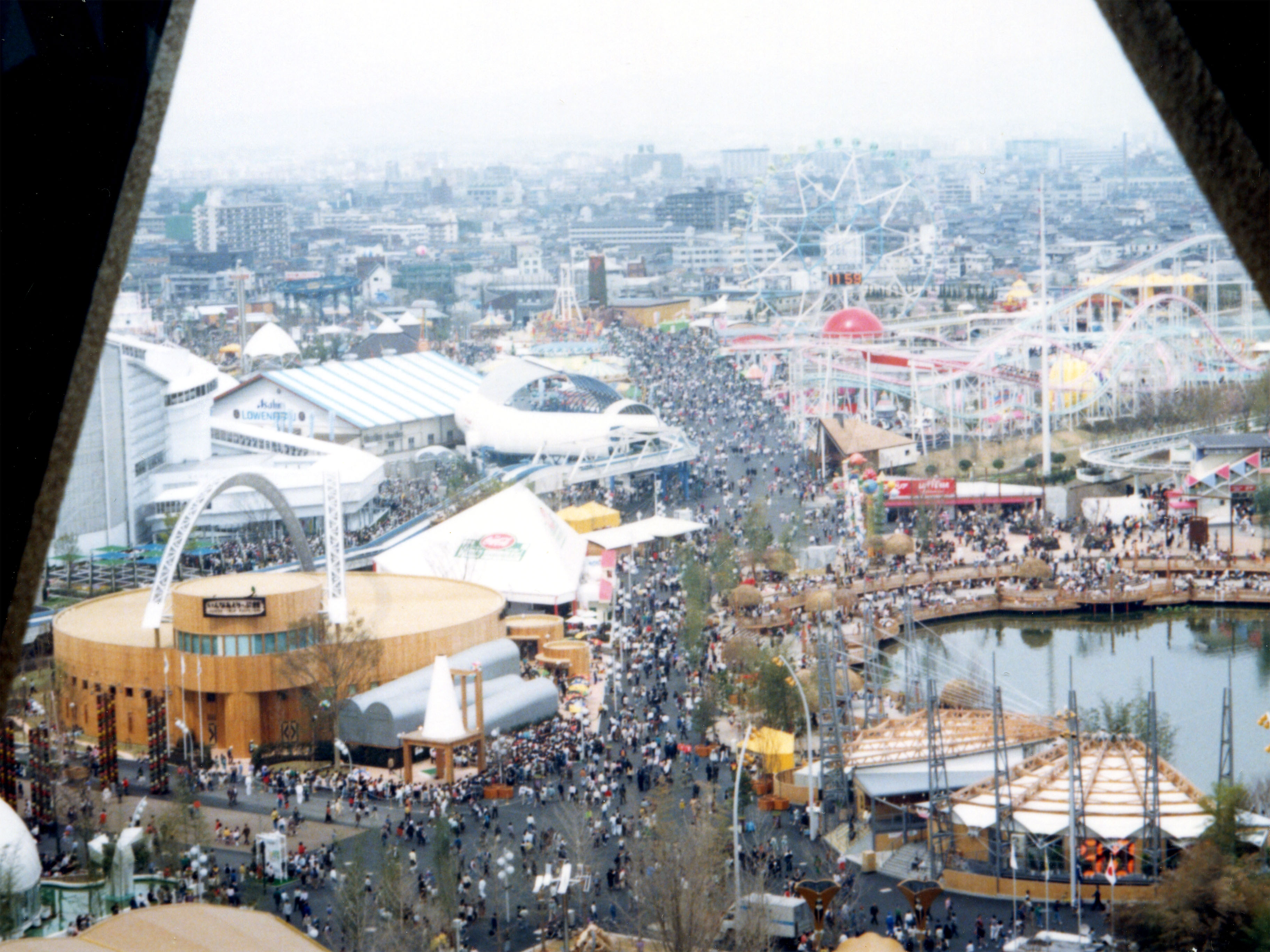
Aerial view

Tsurumi-ryokuchi Station during the Expo

== Legacy ==
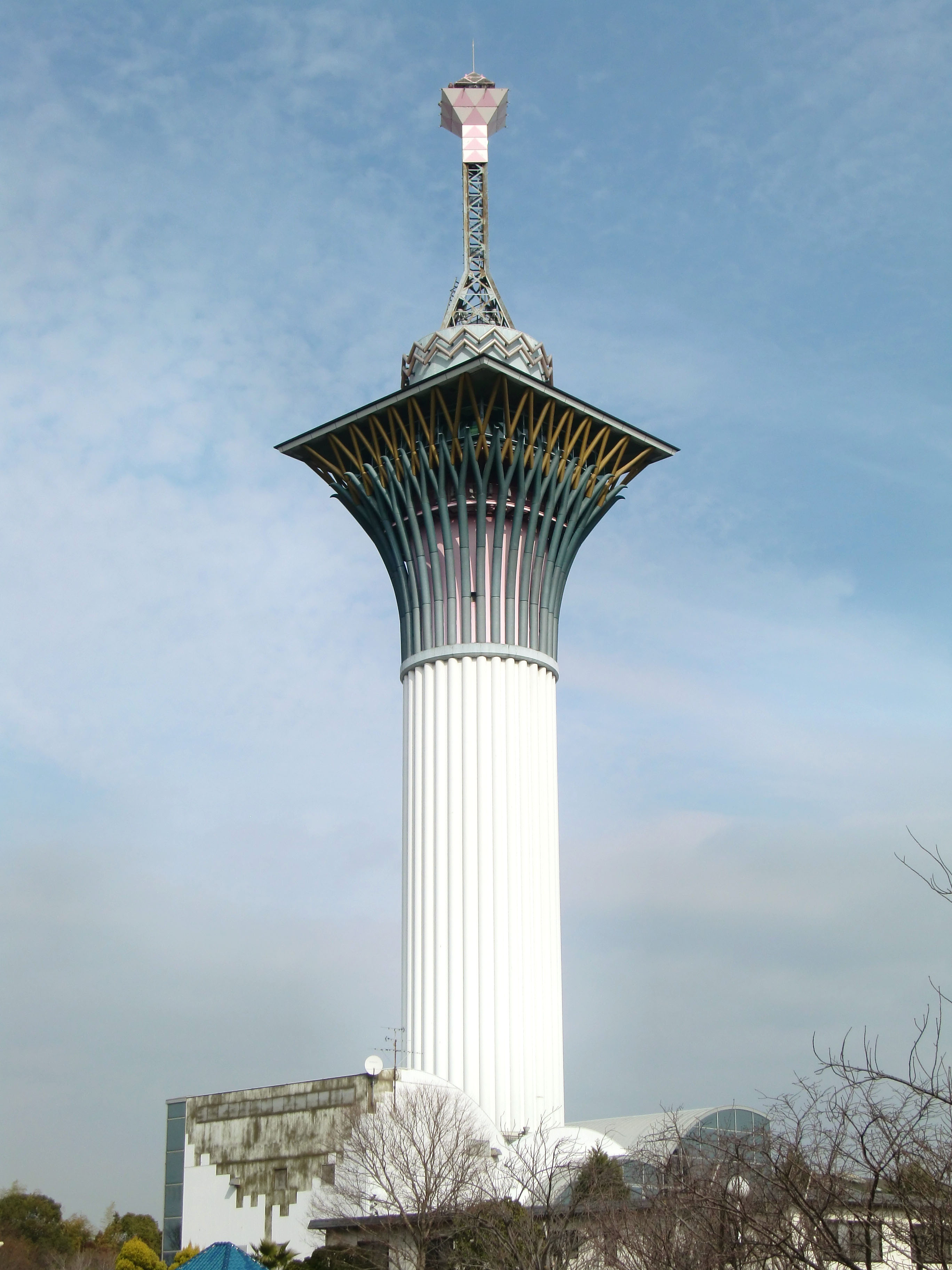
The Tower of Life around the time of its closure (2010).

The exposition triggered interest in horticulture among Japanese people, and local tastes shifted away from simple primary-colored flowers toward more pastel or muted colors.

Osaka City managed the Expo site until 2020, when it was turned over to a private operator. The Tower of Life remained open as a public observatory after the Expo, but visitor numbers dwindled to 20,000 in FY 2007. The tower was closed to visitors in March 2010 and was slated for demolition, but remained standing as of 2022. In July 2026, Osaka City stated that the tower met modern seismic reinforcement standards and could be re-purposed for future use, but that no potential operators made proposals for effective use of the tower, leaving open the possibility of its eventual demolition.
