= 70 series =

70 series may refer to:

== Transport ==
=== Cars ===
- Cadillac Series 70
- Oldsmobile Series 70
- Toyota Land Cruiser (J70)

=== Japanese train types ===
- Osaka Municipal Subway 70 series electric multiple unit
- TWR 70-000 series electric multiple unit

== Computing ==
- UNIVAC Series 70, mainframe computers
