= Kyocera Dome Osaka =

Baseball stadium in Osaka, Japan

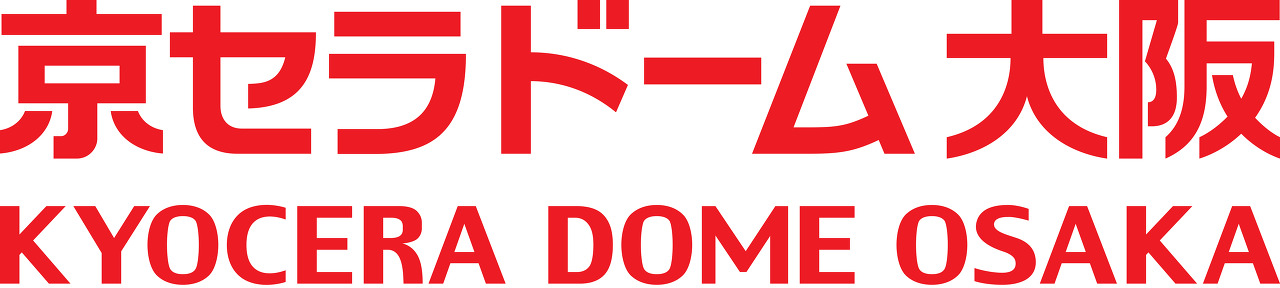

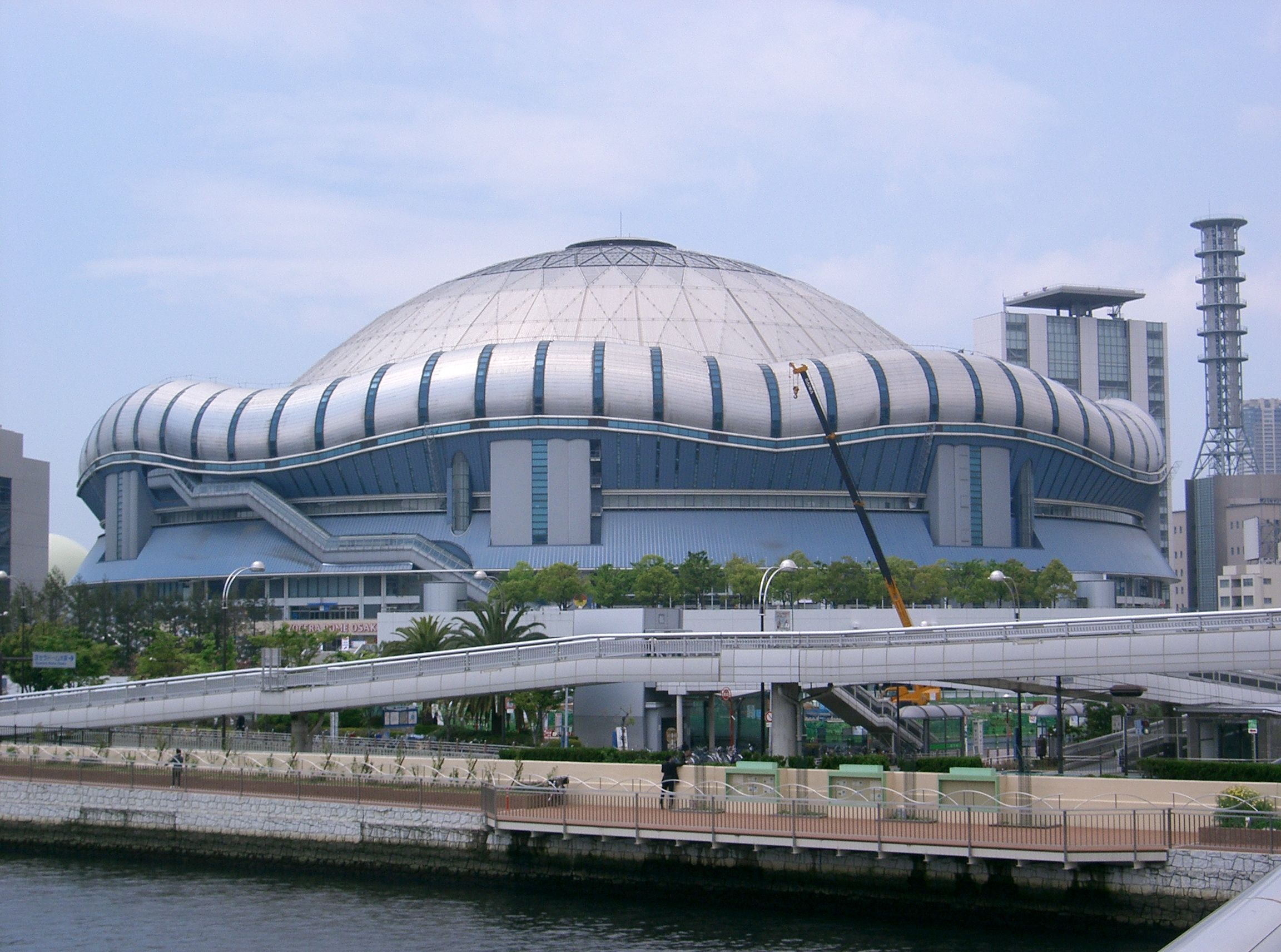
- Interactive map of Kyocera Dome Osaka
- Address: 3-chōme−2−1, Chiyozaki, Nishi Ward
- Location: Osaka, Osaka, Japan
- Coordinates: 34°40′9.48″N 135°28′33.97″E
- Owner: Osaka City Dome Co., Ltd. (Orix Group)
- Capacity: 55,000 (events); 36,627 (baseball)
- Roof: Dome
- Field size: Left: 100.0 m Left-Center: 116.0 m Center: 122.0 m Right-Center: 116.0 m Right: 100.0 m
- Public transit: Dome-mae Chiyozaki; Dome-mae; O Taishō; Kujō

Construction
- Opened: March 1, 1997; 29 years ago
- Architects: Nikken Sekkei, Ltd.

Tenants
- Osaka Kintetsu Buffaloes (Pacific League/NPB) (1997–2004); Orix Buffaloes (Pacific League/NPB) (2005, 2007–present); Hanshin Tigers (during high school tournaments) (Central League/NPB); National Industrial League Championship (2011–present); Osaka Gold Villicanes (KIBL) (2009)

Website
- https://www.kyoceradome-osaka.jp/

The Kyocera Dome Osaka (京セラドーム大阪, Kyōsera Dōmu Ōsaka), officially the Osaka Dome (大阪ドーム, Ōsaka Dōmu), is a baseball stadium located in Osaka, Osaka Prefecture, Japan. Opened in 1997, the stadium was the home field of the Osaka Kintetsu Buffaloes. In 2005, the stadium became one of the homes of the Orix Buffaloes, a result of the merger between the Orix BlueWave and Osaka Kintetsu Buffaloes. Prior to the Osaka Dome opening, the Buffaloes played their home games at Fujiidera Stadium. The Hanshin Tigers also use the stadium as their "home field" for their season openers and their home games in August because their stadium, Koshien Stadium, is used for high school baseball tournaments during those periods.

The Dome hosted the Pride Total Elimination 2005 and Pride Total Elimination Absolute mixed martial arts fights.

== Naming rights by Kyocera ==
Kyocera Corporation subsidiary Kyocera Document Solutions Incorporated has been advertising at Osaka Dome since April 2003. Osaka City Dome Company Limited offered Kyocera naming rights of the domed stadium in January 2006. On March 2, 2006, Kyocera captured the naming rights of the domed stadium and it was scheduled to be named "Kyocera Dome Osaka (京セラドーム大阪)" on April 1. However, the contract entering was delayed until July 1 due to the reorganization of the Dome Company. The original contract was for five years, and it has since been renewed several times.

== Access ==
- A short walk from Dome-mae Chiyozaki Station on the Osaka Metro Nagahori Tsurumi-ryokuchi Line and Dome-mae Station on the Hanshin Railway Hanshin Namba Line.
- A seven-minute walk from Taisho Station on the JR West Osaka Loop Line.
- A nine-minute walk from Kujō Station on the Osaka Metro Chūō Line.

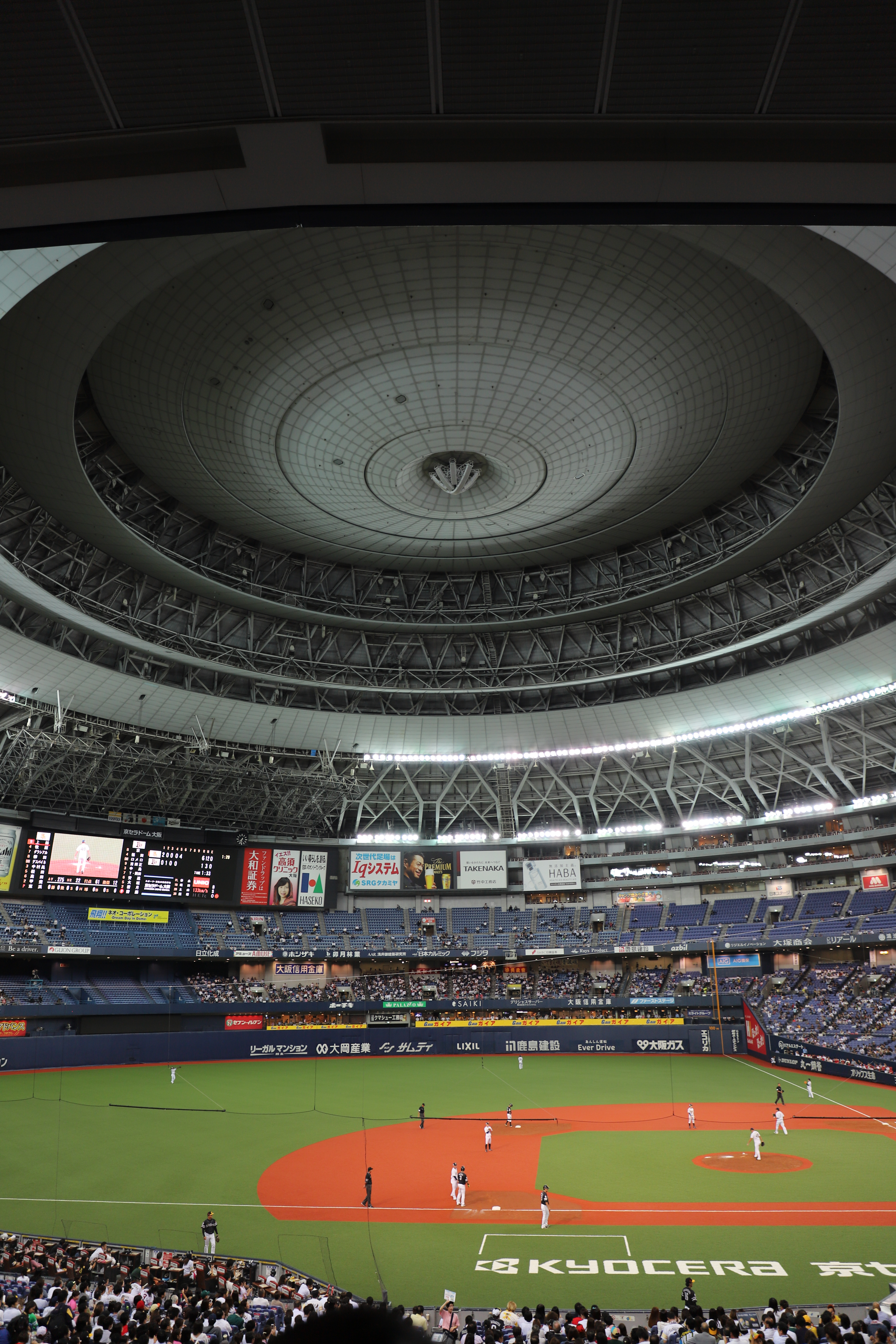
Kyocera Dome, Osaka, September 25, 2018

== See also ==
- List of stadiums in Japan
- Lists of stadiums
