= Osaka Municipal Subway 70 series =

Japanese train type

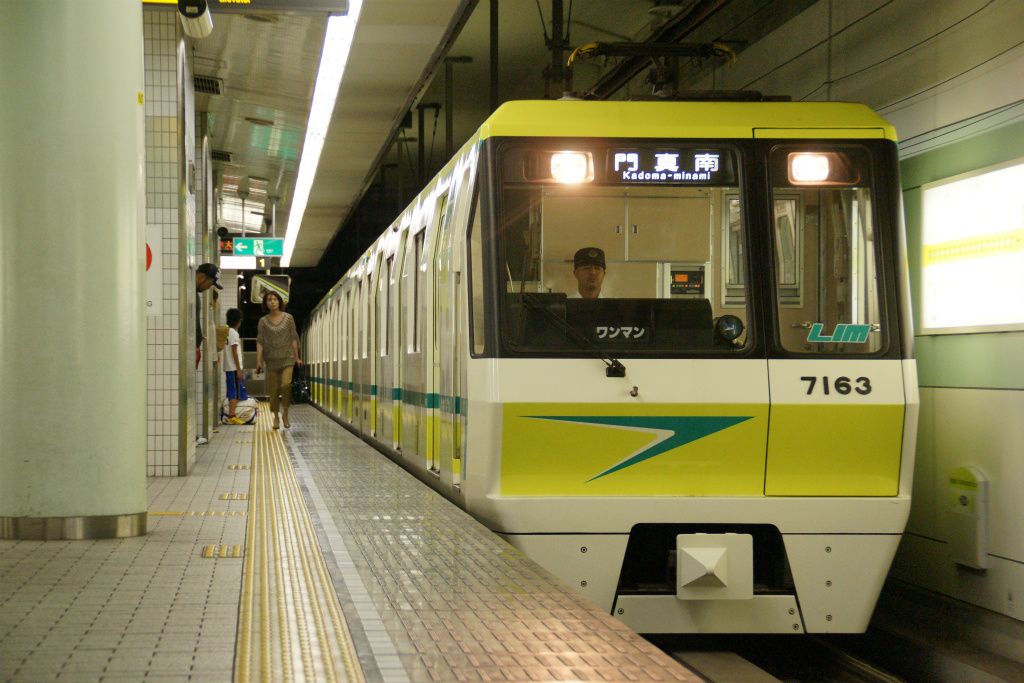
- Osaka Municipal Subway 70 series in revised livery at Kadoma-minami Station, March 2012
- In service: 1990–present
- Manufacturer: Kawasaki Heavy Industries, Kinki Sharyo, Nippon Sharyo, Alna Kōki
- Constructed: 1990–1997
- Entered service: 20 March 1990
- Refurbished: 2011–
- Number built: 100 cars (25 sets)
- Number in service: 100 cars
- Formation: 4 cars per trainset
- Capacity: 380
- Operators: Osaka Municipal Transportation Bureau (1990–2018); Osaka Metro (2018–present)
- Depots: Tsurumi
- Lines served: Nagahori Tsurumi-ryokuchi Line

Specifications
- Car body construction: Aluminium
- Train length: 62.8 m (206 ft 0 in)
- Car length: 15.8 m (51 ft 10 in) (end cars); 15.6 m (51 ft 2 in) (intermediate cars)
- Doors: 3 pairs of sliding doors per side
- Maximum speed: 70 km/h (43 mph)
- Weight: 102 t (100 long tons; 112 short tons)
- Traction system: Variable-frequency
- Traction motors: Linear motors
- Power output: 800 kW (1,073 hp)
- Acceleration: 2.5 km/(h⋅s) (1.6 mph/s)
- Deceleration: 3.5 km/(h⋅s) (2.2 mph/s) (service); 4.5 km/(h⋅s) (2.8 mph/s) (emergency)
- Electric system(s): 1,500 V DC
- Current collector(s): Pantograph
- Braking system(s): Electric commanding
- Safety system(s): CS-ATC, ATO
- Track gauge: 1,435 mm (4 ft 8 1/2 in)

The Osaka Municipal Subway 70 series (大阪市交通局70系) is a rapid transit electric multiple unit (EMU) train type operated by Osaka Municipal Subway on the Nagahori Tsurumi-ryokuchi Line in Japan.

The 70 series was among the earliest trains in Japan to use linear motors, and is capable of driverless operation.

== Refurbishment ==
All 25 70 series trains are scheduled to undergo major refurbishment, with set 13 the first refurbished set to re-enter service on March 4, 2011. The refurbishment will include the fitting of new linear motor traction systems, a new 3-colour LED display system above passenger doors, new LCD passenger information monitors, lower hand grips, a yellow line printed on passenger doors and new train car number indicators on the exterior similar to those seen on the 30000 series and the refurbished 25 series trains.

== See also ==
- List of driverless trains
