= Nagahori Tsurumi-ryokuchi Line =

Metro line in Osaka prefecture, Japan

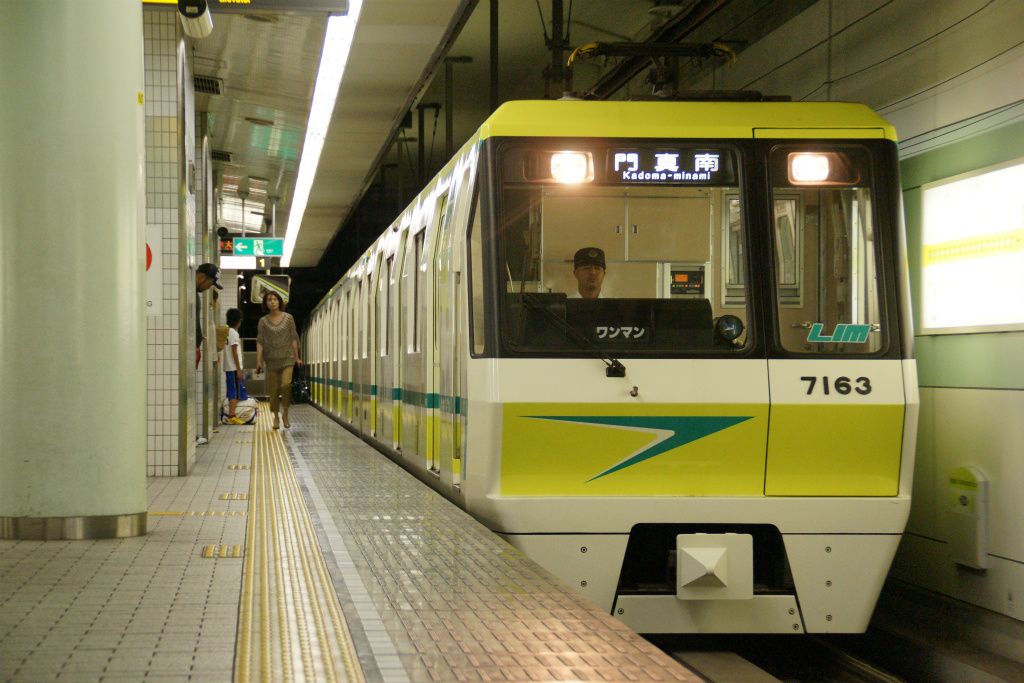
- 70 series linear motor EMU

Overview
- Native name: 長堀鶴見緑地線
- Line number: 7 (N)
- Termini: Taisho; Kadoma-minami
- Stations: 17
- Color on map: Lime green (#A9CC51)

Service
- Type: Rapid transit
- System: Osaka Metro
- Operator(s): Osaka Metro Co., Ltd. (2018–present); Osaka Municipal Transportation Bureau (1990–2018)
- Depot(s): Tsurumi
- Rolling stock: 70 series EMUs

History
- Opened: 31 March 1990; 35 years ago
- Last extension: 1997

Technical
- Line length: 15.0 km (9.3 mi)
- Track length: 15.0 km (9.3 mi)
- Number of tracks: Double-track
- Track gauge: 1,435 mm (4 ft 8 1/2 in) standard gauge
- Minimum radius: 102 m (335 ft)
- Electrification: 1,500 V DC (overhead line)
- Operating speed: 70 km/h (43 mph)
- Signalling: Cab signalling
- Train protection system: CS-ATC, ATO
- Maximum incline: 5.0%
Route map

The Nagahori Tsurumi-ryokuchi Line (長堀鶴見緑地線, Nagahori Tsurumi-ryokuchi-sen) is an underground rapid transit system in Osaka, Japan, operated by Osaka Metro. It was the first linear motor rapid transit line constructed in Japan (and the first outside North America, predated only by the Intermediate Capacity Transit System in Toronto and Vancouver).

Its official name is Rapid Electric Tramway Line No. 7 (高速電気軌道第7号線), and in MLIT publications, it is written as Line No. 7 (Nagahori Tsurumi-ryokuchi Line) (7号線（長堀鶴見緑地線）). Station numbers are indicated by the letter "N".

== History ==
The line is named after Nagahori-dori, a major avenue which it follows through central Osaka, and the Tsurumi-ryokuchi, a park in northeastern Osaka which hosted the International Flower and Greenery Exposition in 1990. The line was built not only to provide access to the park during the exhibition, but also to relieve congestion from the Chūō Line. Its first segment opened on 31 March 1990 between Kyōbashi and Tsurumi-ryokuchi, at which time it was called the Tsurumi-ryokuchi Line (鶴見緑地線).

Under its original plan, the line would have provided access to the Osaka prefectural government offices near Osaka Castle. However, the presence of underground artifacts around the castle area made this plan impractical, and the line was thus shifted farther south, which also provided a better connection with the Chūō Line. On 11 December 1996, the line was opened as far as Shinsaibashi in downtown Osaka, and renamed the Nagahori Tsurumi-ryokuchi Line.

On 29 August 1997, the line was further extended westward to Taishō and eastward to Kadoma-minami.

Over the course of fiscal 2010, the 16 stations within Osaka City were outfitted with automatic platform gates, similar to those already in use on the Imazatosuji Line. At Taishō, the first station to be so equipped, the gates started operation on 7 July 2010. The final station, Kadoma-minami, had them installed over the course of October 2011, with operation starting on 31 October of that year.

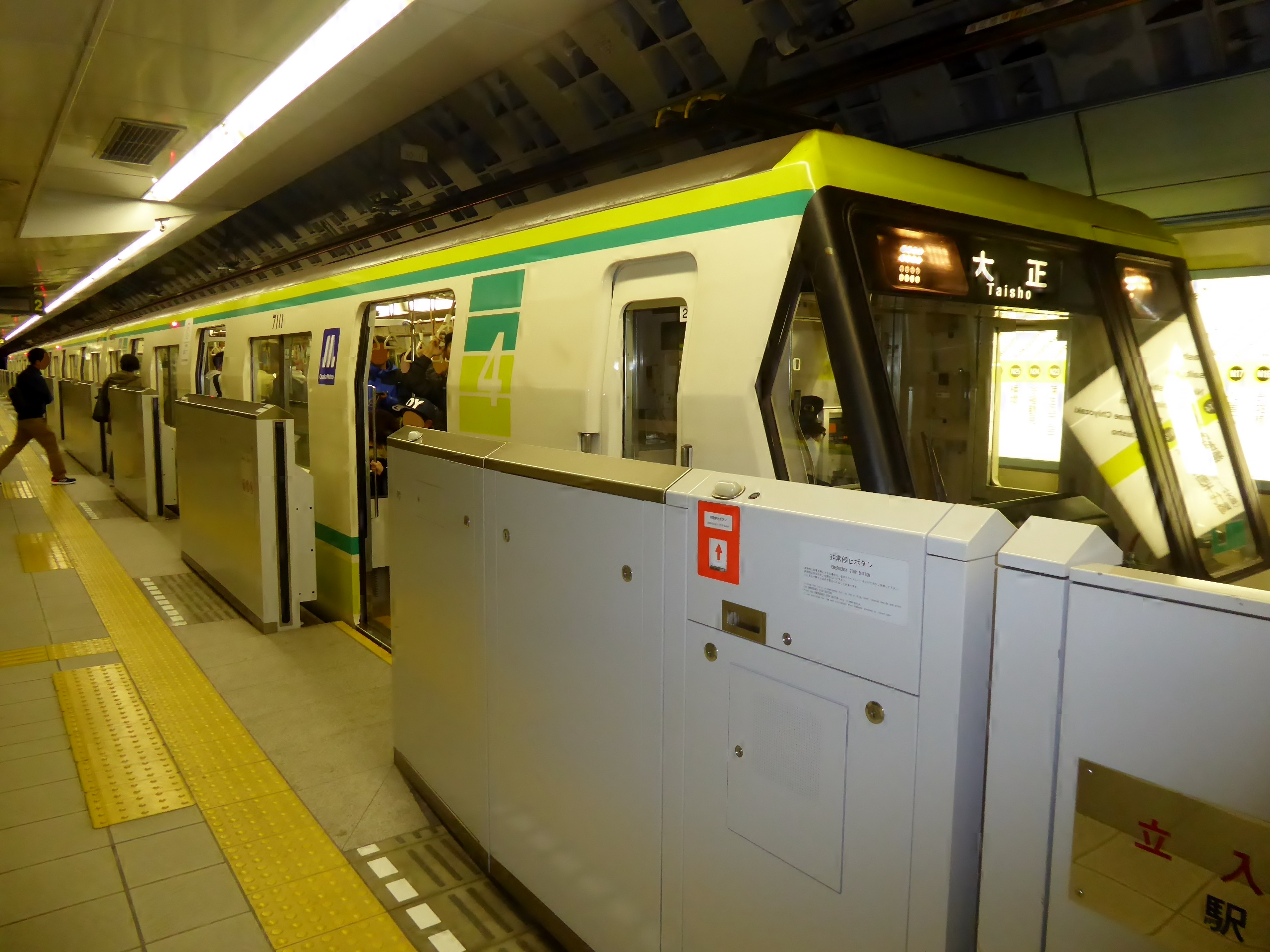
Platform screen doors at Osaka Business Park Station

== Line data ==
- The line is entirely underground, with no above-ground section.
- Block signalling: In-cab signalling
- Train protection system: CS-ATC, ATO
- Cars per train: 4 (1990 – present)
- Maximum possible cars per train (platform length): 6

== Stations ==
No.	Station	Japanese	Distance (km)	Transfers	Location	Coordinates (links to map & photo sources)
N 11	Taishō	大正	0.0	O Osaka Loop Line	Taisho-ku, Osaka	34°39′57″N 135°28′44″E
N 12	Dome-mae Chiyozaki (Kyocera Dome Osaka)	ドーム前千代崎 （京セラドーム大阪）	0.6	Hanshin Namba Line	Nishi-ku, Osaka	34°40′16″N 135°28′46″E
N 13	Nishi-Nagahori	西長堀	1.6	Sennichimae Line (S14)	Nishi-ku, Osaka	34°40′33″N 135°29′13″E
N 14	Nishiōhashi	西大橋	2.2		Nishi-ku, Osaka	34°40′32″N 135°29′37″E
N 15	Shinsaibashi	心斎橋	2.7	Midōsuji Line (M19); Yotsubashi Line – Yotsubashi (Y14)	Chūō-ku, Osaka	34°40′30″N 135°29′59″E
N 16	Nagahoribashi	長堀橋	3.4	Sakaisuji Line (K16)	Chūō-ku, Osaka	34°40′30″N 135°30′23″E
N 17	Matsuyamachi	松屋町	4.0		Chūō-ku, Osaka	34°40′32″N 135°30′45″E
N 18	Tanimachi Rokuchōme	谷町六丁目	4.4	Tanimachi Line (T24)	Chūō-ku, Osaka	34°40′34″N 135°31′05″E
N 19	Tamatsukuri	玉造	5.7	O Osaka Loop Line	Tennōji-ku, Osaka	34°40′29″N 135°31′49″E
N 20	Morinomiya	森ノ宮	6.7	Chūō Line (C19); O Osaka Loop Line (JR-O06)	Chūō-ku, Osaka	34°40′55″N 135°32′00″E
N 21	Osaka Business Park (Osaka-jo Hall)	大阪ビジネスパーク （大阪城ホール前）	7.8		Chūō-ku, Osaka	34°41′31″N 135°31′47″E
N 22	Kyōbashi	京橋	8.5	O Osaka Loop Line; H Gakkentoshi Line; H JR Tōzai Line; Keihan Main Line	Miyakojima-ku, Osaka	34°41′48″N 135°31′48″E
N 23	Gamō-yonchōme	蒲生四丁目	10.2	Imazatosuji Line (I18)	Jōtō-ku, Osaka	34°42′01″N 135°32′52″E
N 24	Imafuku-Tsurumi	今福鶴見	11.4		Jōtō-ku, Osaka	34°42′07″N 135°33′37″E
N 25	Yokozutsumi	横堤	12.5		Tsurumi-ku, Osaka	34°42′13″N 135°34′23″E
N 26	Tsurumi-ryokuchi	鶴見緑地	13.7		Tsurumi-ku, Osaka	34°42′39″N 135°34′49″E
N 27	Kadoma-minami	門真南	15.0	Osaka Monorail Main Line (proposed extension)	Kadoma	34°43′00″N 135°35′32″E

== Stopping patterns ==
All trains stop at every station on their route. Most trains operate between Taishō and Kadoma-minami; trains also operate shortened services which run from Taishō to either Shinsaibashi or Yokozutsumi during events held at Osaka Dome. Trains run every 2–4 minutes during peak hours, and every 7 minutes during off-peak hours.

== Rolling stock ==
- 70 series - 25 four-car EMU trainsets (since 1990)
- 80 series [ja] - one four-car EMU trainset (since 2019)

Trains are automatically driven using ATO with a single driver on board to open and close the doors and to manually drive the train in emergency situations or when ATO breaks down or is not available. All trains are stored at the underground Tsurumi-ryokuchi-kita depot (shared with the Imazatosuji Line) located beneath the northwest gate of the Tsurumi-ryokuchi park, and maintained at the underground Tsurumi workshop located beneath the Tsurumi-ryokuchi sports complex.

To increase the transportation capacity of the Nagahori Tsurumi-ryokuchi Line, one four-car set of 80 series cars from the Imazatosuji Line, made redundant after the 2013 timetable revision, was converted for the Nagahori Tsurumi-ryokuchi Line and started operation in mid-March 2019.
