= Shinsaibashi Station =

Metro station in Osaka, Japan

Coordinates: 34°40′30.08″N 135°30′1.11″E

Shinsaibashi Station 心斎橋駅
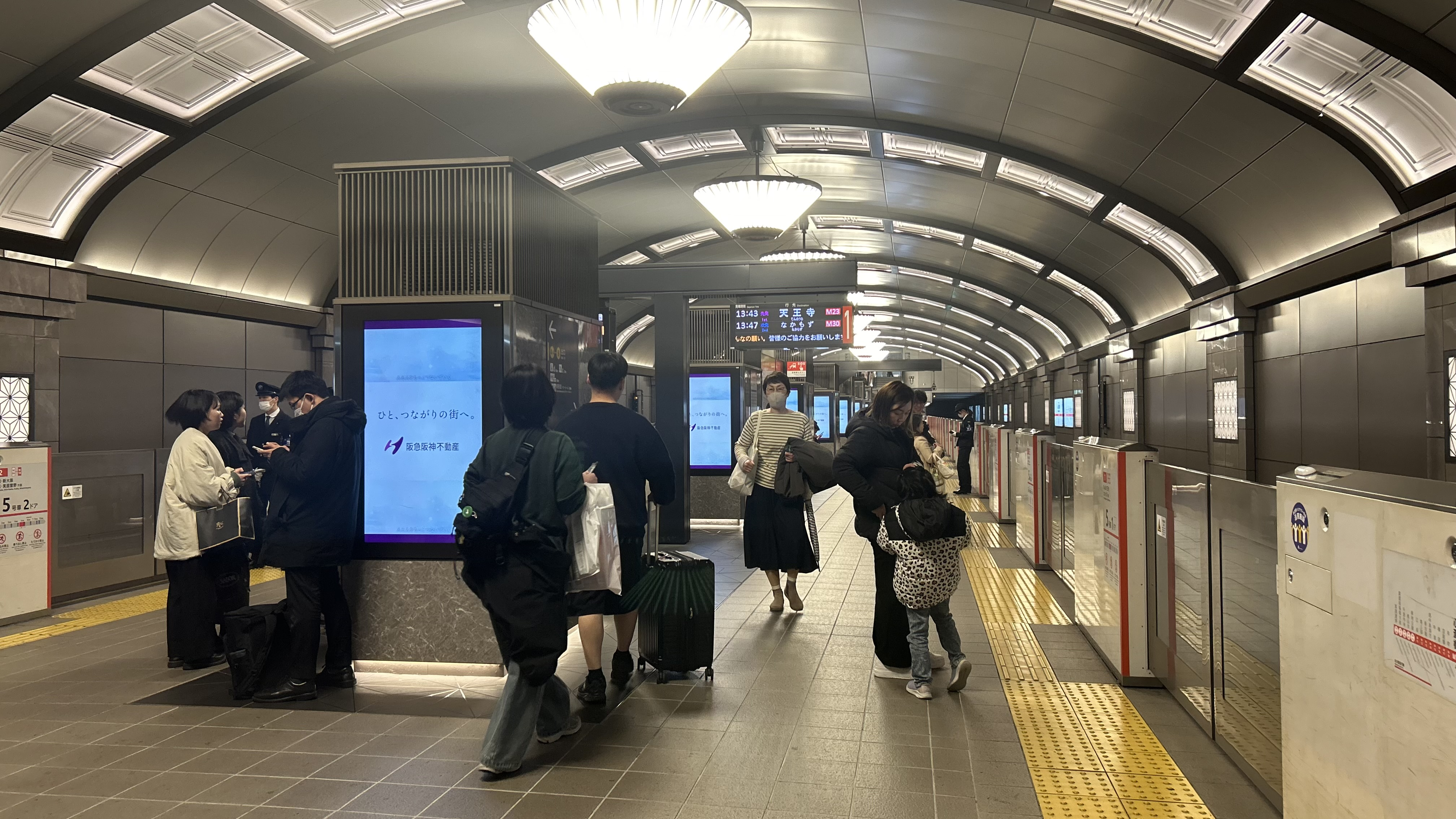
- Midōsuji Line platform

General information
- System: Osaka Metro
- Operator: Osaka Metro
- Lines: Midōsuji Line; Nagahori Tsurumi-ryokuchi Line
- Platforms: 2 island platforms (1 for each line)
- Tracks: 4 (2 for each line)
- Connections: Yotsubashi Line (Yotsubashi Y 14 )

Other information
- Station code: M 19 N 15

History
- Opened: 20 May 1933 (Midosuji Line); 11 December 1996 (Nagahori Tsurumi-ryokuchi Line)

Services
Preceding station	Osaka Metro	Following station
Hommachi M 18 towards Esaka	Midōsuji Line	Namba M 20 towards Nakamozu
Nishiōhashi N 14 towards Taishō	Nagahori Tsurumi-ryokuchi Line	Nagahoribashi N 16 towards Kadoma-minami
Location
- Location within Osaka Prefecture Location within Japan

Shinsaibashi Station (心斎橋駅, Shinsaibashi-eki) is a metro station on the Osaka Metro located in Shinsaibashi, Chūō-ku, Osaka, Japan.

== Lines ==
- Osaka Metro
  - Midōsuji Line (Station number: M19)
  - Nagahori Tsurumi-ryokuchi Line (Station number: N15)
  - Yotsubashi Line (Yotsubashi, Station number: Y14)

For the purpose of fare calculation, Shinsaibashi Station is treated as the same station as Yotsubashi Station on the Yotsubashi Line.

== History ==
- May 20, 1933 - The Midōsuji Line from temporary Umeda Station to Shinsaibashi Station opened.
- December 11, 1996 - The Tsurumi-ryokuchi Line from Kyobashi to Shinsaibashi was opened, and the line was renamed the Nagahori Tsurumi-ryokuchi Line.
- August 29, 1997 - The Nagahori Tsurumi-ryokuchi Line from Shinsaibashi to Taisho and from Tsurumi-ryokuchi and Kadoma-minami were opened. A moving walkway was also installed to link Shinsaibashi with the neighbouring Yotsubashi Station.

It was announced in 2014 that the Midōsuji Line will get platform screen doors installed at the station.

== Layout ==
This station has an island platform with two tracks for each line. The one for the Nagahori Tsurumi-ryokuchi Line is fenced with platform gates.

Midōsuji Line (M19)

1	■ Midōsuji Line	for Namba, Tennōji and Nakamozu
2	■ Midōsuji Line	for Umeda, Shin-Ōsaka and Minoh-kayano

Nagahori Tsurumi-ryokuchi Line (N15)

1	■ Nagahori Tsurumi-ryokuchi Line	for Morinomiya, Kyobashi and Kadomaminami
2	■ Nagahori Tsurumi-ryokuchi Line	for Taisho

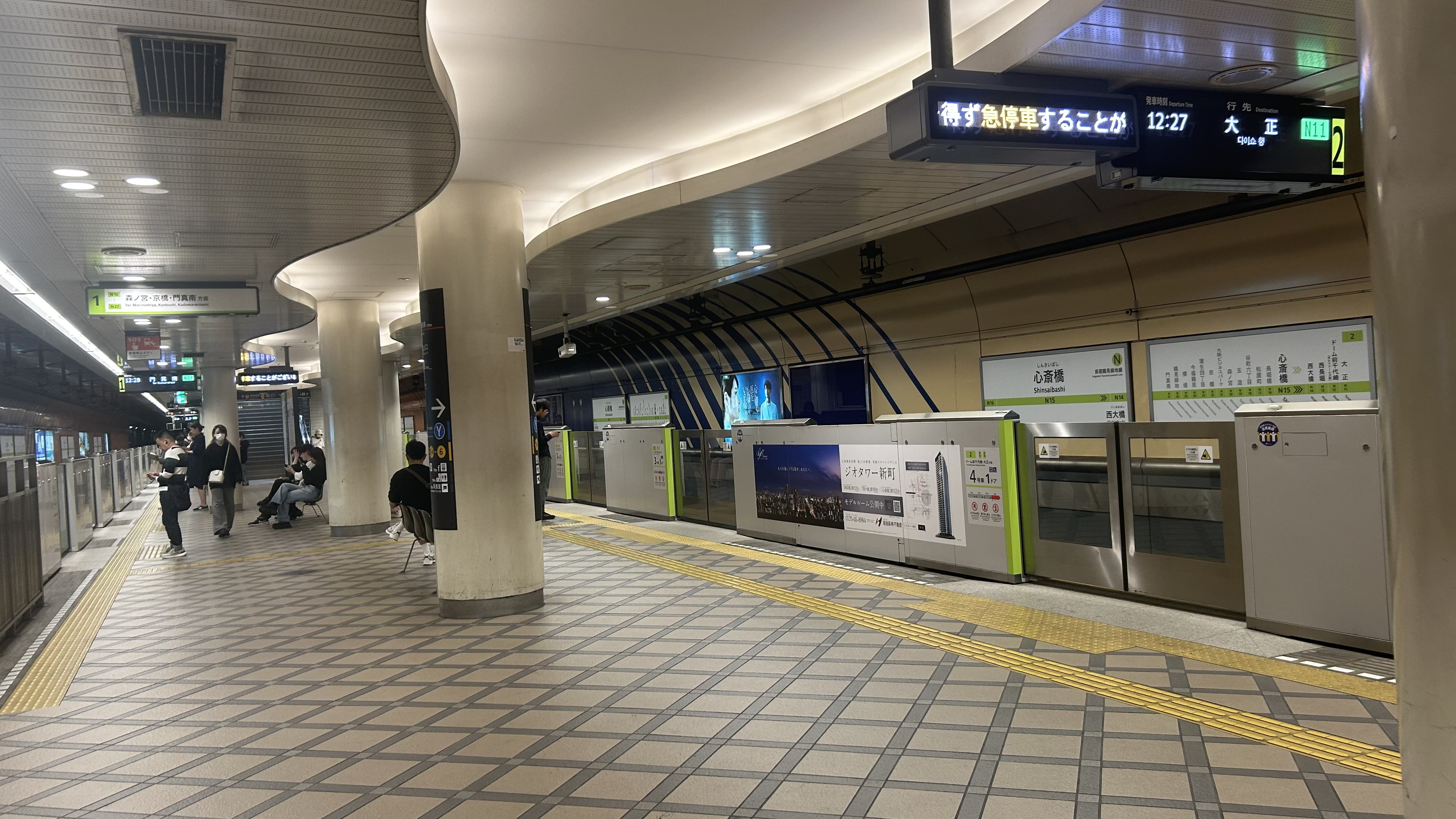
Nagahori Tsurumi-ryokuchi Line platform

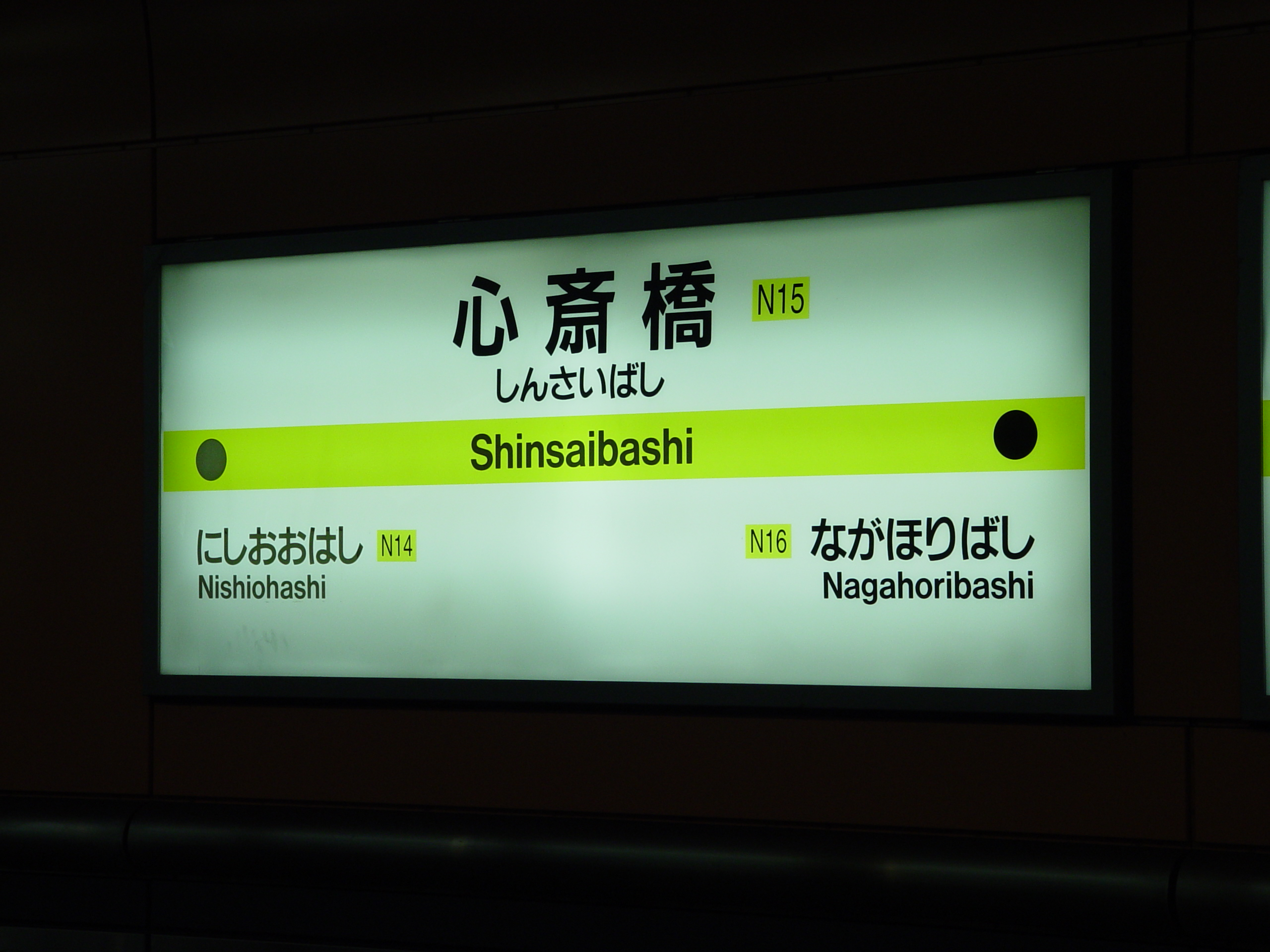
Station sign (Nagahori Tsurumi-ryokuchi Line)

== Surroundings ==
- Daimaru
  - North Building
  - Head Building
  - South Building
- Tokyu Hands
- PARCO Shinsaibashi
- Amerikamura
- Orange Street
- Shinsaibashisuji Shopping Arcade
- Crysta Nagahori
- OPA
- Camera Naniwa
- Hotel Nikko Osaka
