= Kyōbashi Station (Osaka) =

Railway station in Osaka, Japan

Kyobashi Station 京橋駅
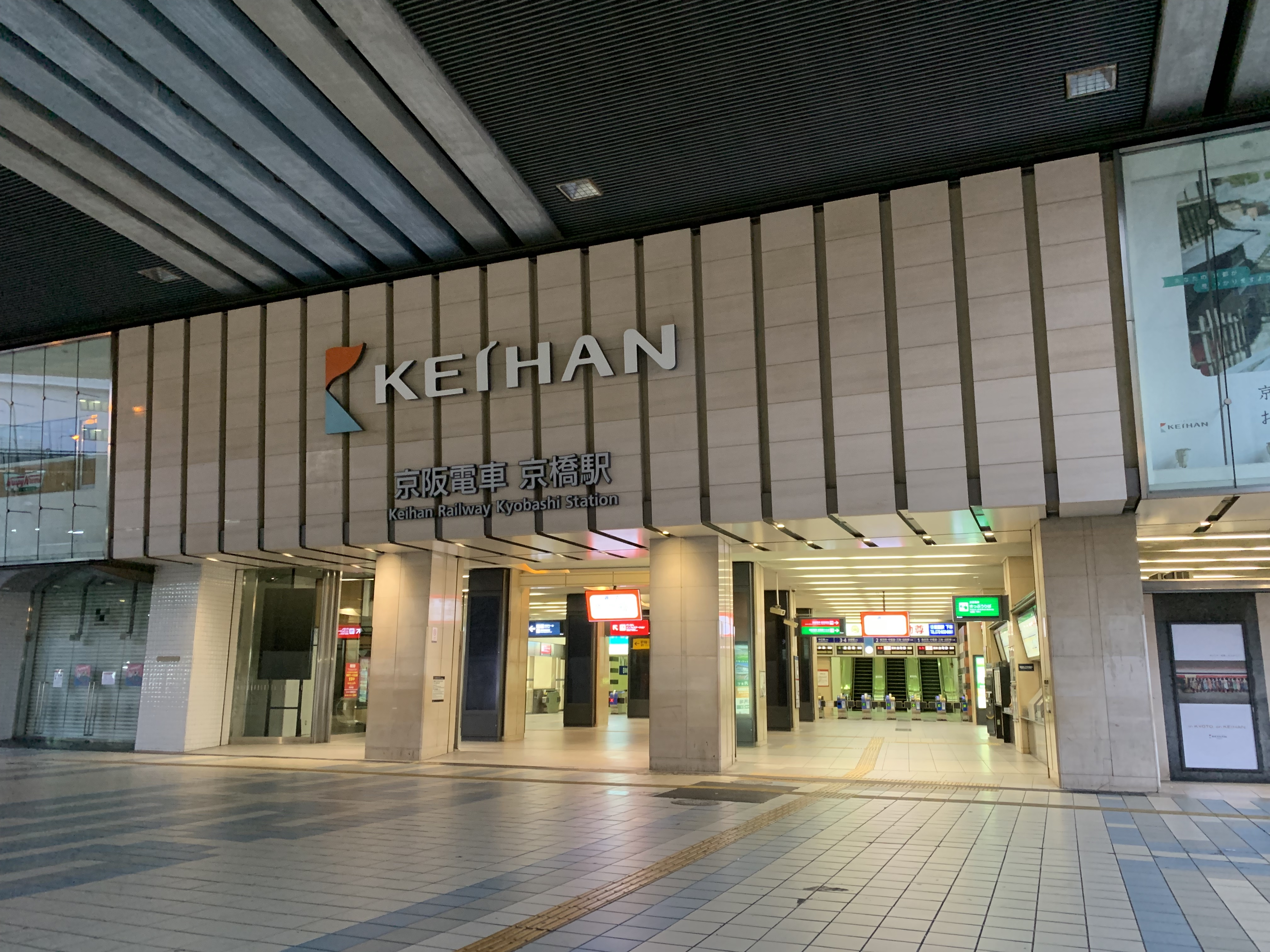
- Kyobashi Station

General information
- Location: Osaka, Osaka; Japan
- Operator: JR West; Keihan Railway; Osaka Metro
- Connections: Bus stop

History
- Opened: 17 October 1895; 130 years ago
Location
- Location within Osaka Prefecture Location within Kansai region Location within Japan

Kyobashi Station (京橋駅, Kyōbashi-eki) is a railway station in the Kyōbashi district of Jōtō-ku and Miyakojima-ku, Osaka, Japan, jointly operated by West Japan Railway Company (JR West), the private railway operator Keihan Railway, and the Osaka Metro.

== Lines ==
JR West

- O Osaka Loop Line
- H Gakkentoshi Line (Katamachi Line)
- H JR Tōzai Line

The Tōzai and Gakkentoshi Lines form a combined service line in practice.

Keihan Railway (KH04)

- Keihan Main Line

Osaka Metro

- Nagahori Tsurumi-ryokuchi Line (N22)

== JR West ==
Kyōbashi Station 京橋駅
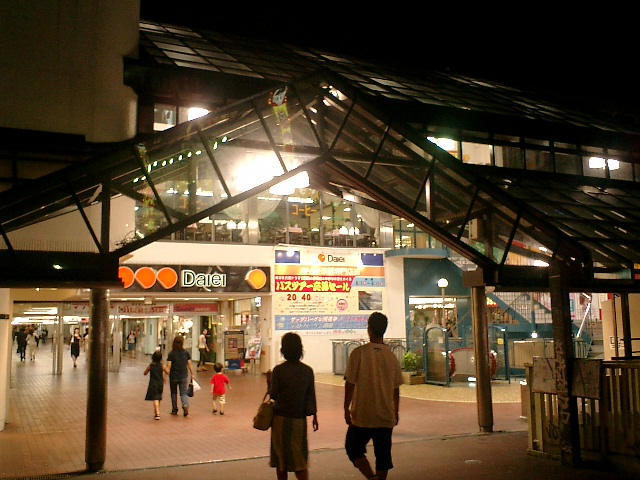
- West Entrance

General information
- Location: 1-2-31 Shin-Kita, Jōtō Ward, Osaka; Osaka Prefecture; Japan
- Coordinates: 34°41′45.59″N 135°32′4.92″E
- Operator: JR West
- Lines: O Osaka Loop Line; H Katamachi Line (Gakkentoshi Line); H JR Tōzai Line
- Platforms: 4 island platforms (2 for each line)
- Tracks: 4 (2 for each line)

Construction
- Structure type: Elevated (Osaka Loop); At ground (Katamachi/Tōzai)

Other information
- Station code: JR-O08 (Osaka Loop Line); JR-H41 (JR Tozai Line)

History
- Opened: 17 October 1895; 130 years ago
Services
Preceding station	JR West	Following station
Osakajō-kōen towards Tennōji	Osaka Loop Line	Sakuranomiya towards Shin-Imamiya
through to JR Tōzai Line	Gakkentoshi Line Local	Shigino towards Kizu
through to JR Tōzai Line	Gakkentoshi Line Regional Rapid Rapid	Hanaten towards Kizu
Osakajō-kitazume towards Amagasaki	JR Tōzai Line Local Regional Rapid Rapid	through to Gakkentoshi Line
Location

As of 2010, Kyobashi was the fourth-busiest station in the JR West network after Osaka Station, Kyoto Station and Tennoji Station.

=== Layout ===
==== Gakkentoshi Line (Katamachi Line) and JR Tōzai Line ====
There are an island platform and a side platform with two tracks at ground level.

1	■ JR Tōzai Line	for Kitashinchi and Amagasaki
2	■ Gakkentoshi Line	for Shijonawate and Doshisha-mae

==== Osaka Loop Line ====
There are two side platforms with two elevated tracks.

3	■ Osaka Loop Line	inner track (counter-clockwise) for Osaka, Nishikujo, Universal City, Nara, Kansai Airport, and Wakayama
4	■ Osaka Loop Line	outer track (clockwise) for Tsuruhashi and Tennoji

=== History ===
The station opened on 17 October 1895.

During the bombing of Osaka on August 14, 1945, a one-ton bomb directly struck the Katamachi Line platform and killed 700 to 800 evacuees. Kyobashi was one of the last sites to be bombed in Japan during World War II, followed only by the bombing of Akita, later the same day. A memorial was erected on the site in 1947, and anniversary services have been held at the station every year since 1955.

With the privatization of Japanese National Railways (JNR) on 1 April 1987, the station came under the control of JR West.

The JR Tozai Line opened in 1997, at which point Kyobashi became a terminal for both the Tozai Line and Katamachi Line.

Station numbering was introduced on the JR West lines in March 2018 with the Osaka Loop Line being assigned station number JR-O08 and the Tozai Line being assigned station number JR-H41.

== Keihan Railway ==
Kyobashi Station 京橋駅
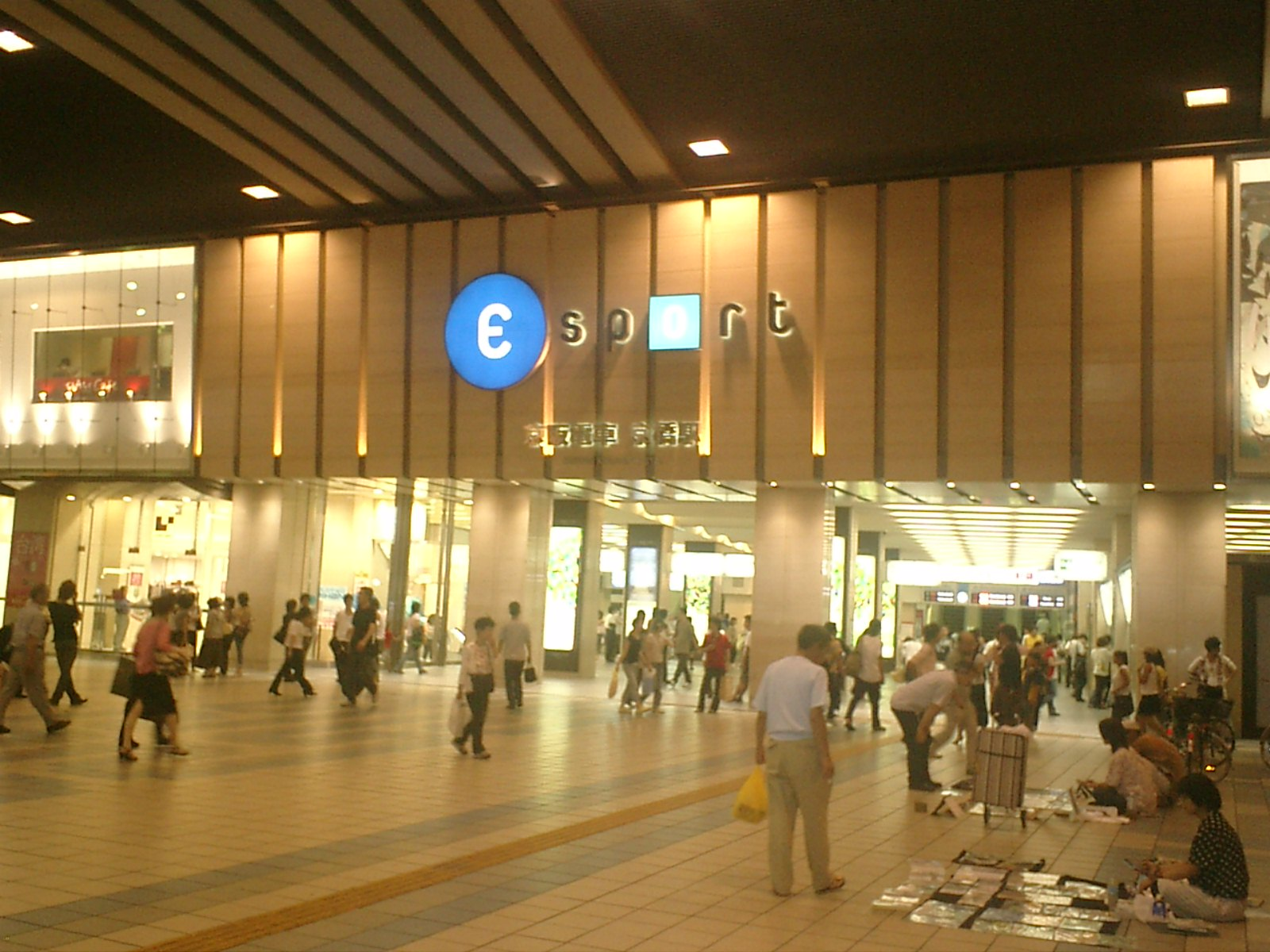
- The Keihan entrance

General information
- Location: 2-1-38 Higashinodacho, Miyakojima-ku, Osaka; Japan
- Coordinates: 34°41′49.35″N 135°31′55.82″E
- System: Keihan Railway station
- Operator: Keihan Railway
- Line: Keihan Main Line

Other information
- Station code: KH04

History
- Opened: 15 April 1910
- Former names: Gamo (until 1949)
Location

Kyobashi is the busiest station in the Keihan network.

This station is the transfer station between the Keihan Line and the Nakanoshima Line. The connections are follows:

eastbound: trains from Nakanoshima ←→ trains from Yodoyabashi
westbound: trains for Nakanoshima ←→ trains for Yodoyabashi

=== Layout ===
Two island platforms on the 4th level serve four tracks.

1, 2	■ Keihan Line	for Hirakatashi, Chushojima, Sanjo, and Demachiyanagi
3, 4	■ Keihan Line	for Yodoyabashi and Nakanoshima

=== Adjacent stations ===
«	Service	»
Keihan Main Line
Temmabashi	Local	Noe
Temmabashi	Semi-express	Moriguchishi
Temmabashi	Sub-express	Moriguchishi
Temmabashi	Commuter sub-express (on weekday mornings, only running for Yodoyabashi or Nakanoshima)	Kayashima
Temmabashi	Express	Moriguchishi
Temmabashi	Midnight express for Kuzuha	Neyagawashi
Temmabashi	Rapid express	Moriguchishi
Temmabashi	Commuter rapid express (on weekday mornings, only running for or Nakanoshima)	Neyagawashi
Temmabashi	Limited express	Hirakatashi
Temmabashi	Rapid Limited Express Rakuraku	Shichijō
Temmabashi	Liner	Hirakatashi

=== History ===
The Keihan terminal opened on 15 April 1910, originally named Gamō Station (蒲生駅). It was renamed Kyōbashi on 1 October 1949, and was rebuilt as an elevated station, completed on 15 April 1970.

== Osaka Metro ==
Kyōbashi Station 京橋駅

General information
- Location: 2-6-18 Higashinodacho, Miyakojima-ku, Osaka; Japan
- Coordinates: 34°41′48.18″N 135°31′47.32″E
- System: Osaka Metro
- Operator: Osaka Metro
- Line: Nagahori Tsurumi-ryokuchi Line
- Platforms: 1 island platform
- Tracks: 2

Construction
- Structure type: Underground

Other information
- Station code: N 22

History
- Opened: 20 March 1990; 36 years ago

Services
Preceding station	Osaka Metro	Following station
Osaka Business Park N 21 towards Taishō	Nagahori Tsurumi-ryokuchi Line	Gamō-yonchōme N 23 towards Kadoma-minami
Track layout
Location

The Osaka Metro Subway station opened on 20 March 1990 when the Tsurumi-Ryokuchi Line was extended between Kyobashi and Tsurumi-ryokuchi Station.

=== Layout ===
An island platform on the 3rd basement fenced with platform gates serves two tracks.

1	■ Nagahori Tsurumi-ryokuchi Line	eastbound for Kadomaminami
2	■ Nagahori Tsurumi-ryokuchi Line	westbound for Morinomiya, Shinsaibashi, and Taisho

== Surrounding area ==
- Keihan Mall
- KiKi Kyobashi
- Kyobashi Guranshato Building
- COMS Garden
- Miyakojima Ward office
- Osaka Business Park
- National Route 1

=== Buses ===
Bus services are operated by Osaka City Bus and Kintetsu Bus.

== See also ==
- List of railway stations in Japan
