= Taishō Station (Osaka) =

Railway and metro station in Osaka, Japan

Taisho Station 大正駅
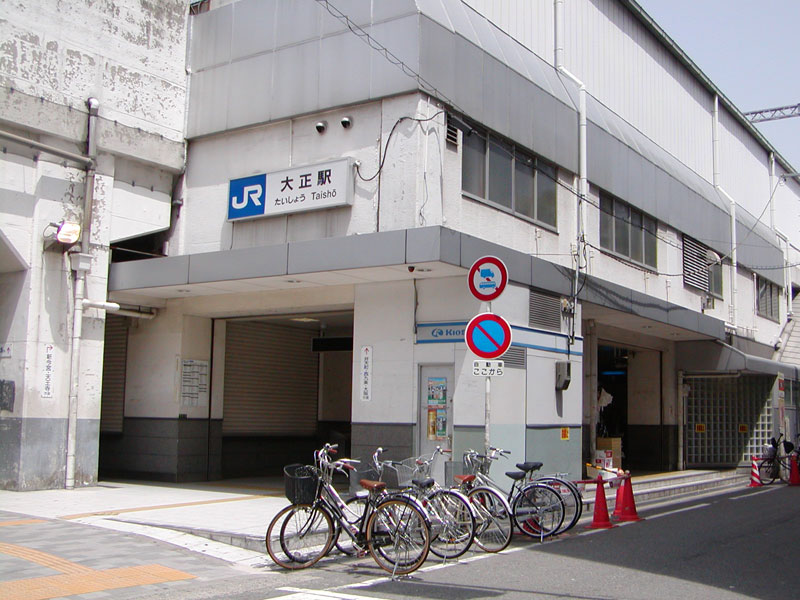
- Entrance to the JR West portion of the station

General information
- Operator: JR West; Osaka Metro
- Lines: Osaka Loop Line; Nagahori Tsurumi-ryokuchi Line
- Platforms: 2 side platforms (JR West); 1 island platform (Osaka Metro)
- Tracks: 4
- Connections: Bus stop

Other information
- Station code: JR-O16 (Osaka Loop Line); N 11 (Nagahori Tsurumi-Ryokuchi Line)

History
- Opened: 25 April 1961 (JR West); 29 August 1997 (Osaka Metro)

Services
Preceding station	Osaka Metro	Following station
Terminus	Nagahori Tsurumi-ryokuchi Line	Dome-mae Chiyozaki N 12 towards Kadoma-minami
Location
- Location within Osaka Prefecture Location within Japan

Taisho Station (大正駅, Taishō-eki) is a combined railway station and metro station located in Taishō-ku, Osaka, Japan. The station is served by the Osaka Loop Line and the Nagahori Tsurumi-ryokuchi Line.

== Lines ==
- JR West Osaka Loop Line (34°39′55.87″N 135°28′47.91″E)
- Osaka Metro
  - Nagahori Tsurumi-ryokuchi Line (N11) (34°39′58.03″N 135°28′44.59″E)

== Layout ==
3F; JR West platforms	Side platform, doors will open on the left
3F; JR West platforms	Platform 2	→ O Osaka Loop Line clockwise (Bentenchō) →
3F; JR West platforms	Platform 1	← O Osaka Loop Line counterclockwise (Ashiharabashi)
3F; JR West platforms	Side platform, doors will open on the left
2F	JR West station mezzanine	JR West faregates, ticket machines, station agent
1F	Street level	Exit/Entrance; transfer between JR West and Osaka Metro stations
B1F	Osaka Metro mezzanine	Osaka Metro faregates, ticket machines, station agent
B2F; Metro platforms	Platform 1	→ Nagahori Tsurumi-ryokuchi Line toward Kadoma-minami (Dome-mae Chiyozaki) →
B2F; Metro platforms	Island platform, doors will open on the right
B2F; Metro platforms	Platform 2	← Nagahori Tsurumi-ryokuchi Line termination platforn

JR West Osaka Loop Line

JR West station has two side platforms serving two tracks elevated, administrated by Shin-Imamiya Station. IC ride cards ICOCA, PiTaPa and other 8 brands are accepted.

1	■ Osaka Loop Line	counterclockwise-bound for Shin-Imamiya, Tennōji, Nara, Kansai Airport and Wakayama
2	■ Osaka Loop Line	clockwise-bound for Nishikujō and Ōsaka

Osaka Metro Nagahori Tsurumi-ryokuchi Line

Subway station has an island platform fenced with platform gates between two tracks under the ground level. IC ride cards PiTaPa, ICOCA and other 8 brands and Surutto KANSAI ride cards are accepted.

1	■ Nagahori Tsurumi-ryokuchi Line	for Shinsaibashi, Kyōbashi and Kadoma-minami (for embarking passengers)
2	■ Nagahori Tsurumi-ryokuchi Line	only for disembarking passengers

Trains arrive at Platform 2 and disembark passengers, and return at the sidetracks in the south of the station, then enter Platform 1 as ones for Kadoma-minami.

== Train services in off-peak hours ==
JR West Osaka Loop Line
12 clockwise-bound trains go to Osaka, of which:

4 are local trains and stop at every station.
8 are rapid services and stop at Bentencho, Nishikujo and every station from Fukushima.

12 counterclockwise-bound trains go to Tennoji, of which:

4 are local trains to Tsuruhashi.
4 are Yamatoji rapid services to Nara via the Yamatoji Line, 2 of which continue to Kamo.
4 are Kansai Airport rapid services to Kansai Airport and Kishuji rapid services to Wakayama via the Hanwa Line.

Osaka Metro Nagahori Tsurumi-ryokuchi Line

8 or 9 trains go to Kadoma-minami (every 7 minutes).

== Surrounding area ==
- Osaka Dome (a 7-minute walk from JR West station)
- Taisho Post Office
- Taisho Bridge
- Iwasaki Bridge
- Onami Bridge

== Bus routes (Taishobashi) ==
Buses are operated by Osaka City Bus. See the external link for details of Taishobashi Bus Stop.

- Route 51 for Tempozan via Bentencho-ekimae and Daisan Tottei-mae / for Dome-mae Chiyozaki
- Route 60 for Tempozan via Sakaigawa and Subway Asashiobashi / for Namba (Takashimaya)
- Route 70 for Nishi-Funamachi via Taisho Kuyakusho-mae and Daiumbashi-dori / for Dome-mae Chiyozaki
- Route 70 Express for Nishi-Funamachi via Taisho Kuyakusho-mae and Daiumbashi-dori / for Dome-mae Chiyozaki
- Route 71 for Tsurumachi Yonchome via Taisho Kuyakusho-mae and Daiumbashi-dori / for Namba
- Route 76 for Subway Suminoekoen / for Dome-mae Chiyozaki
- Route 87 for Tsurumachi Yonchome via Shin-Chitose / for Namba
- Route 90 for Tsurumachi Yonchome via Taisho Kuyakusho-mae and Daiumbashi-dori / for Nodahanshin-mae
- Route 91 for Tsurumachi Yonchome via Taisho Kuyakusho-mae and Daiumbashi-dori / for Dome-mae Chiyozaki
- Route 91 Express for Tsurumachi Yonchome via Taisho Kuyakusho-mae and Daiumbashi-dori / for Dome-mae Chiyozaki
- Route 94 for Tsurumachi Yonchome via Chishima Koen-mae and Daiumbashi-dori / for Dome-mae Chiyozaki
- Route 98 for Taisho Kuyakusho-mae via Shin-Chitose / for Dome-mae Chiyozaki

== History ==
Station numbering was introduced to the JR West facilities in March 2018 with Taisho being assigned station number JR-O16.

== Adjacent stations ==
«	Service	»
West Japan Railway Company (JR West) Osaka Loop Line
Limited Express Kuroshio: Does not stop at this station
Kansai Airport Limited Express Haruka: Does not stop at this station
Bentenchō	Local	Ashiharabashi
Bentenchō	Regional Rapid Service	Ashiharabashi
Bentenchō	Direct Rapid Service (Clockwise trains only)	Ashiharabashi
Bentenchō	Yamatoji Rapid Service	Shin-Imamiya
Bentenchō	Rapid Service	Shin-Imamiya
Bentenchō	Kansai Airport Rapid Service	Shin-Imamiya
Bentenchō	Kishuji Rapid Service	Shin-Imamiya
