= Kadoma-minami Station =

Metro station in Kadoma, Osaka Prefecture, Japan

Kadoma-minami Station 門真南駅
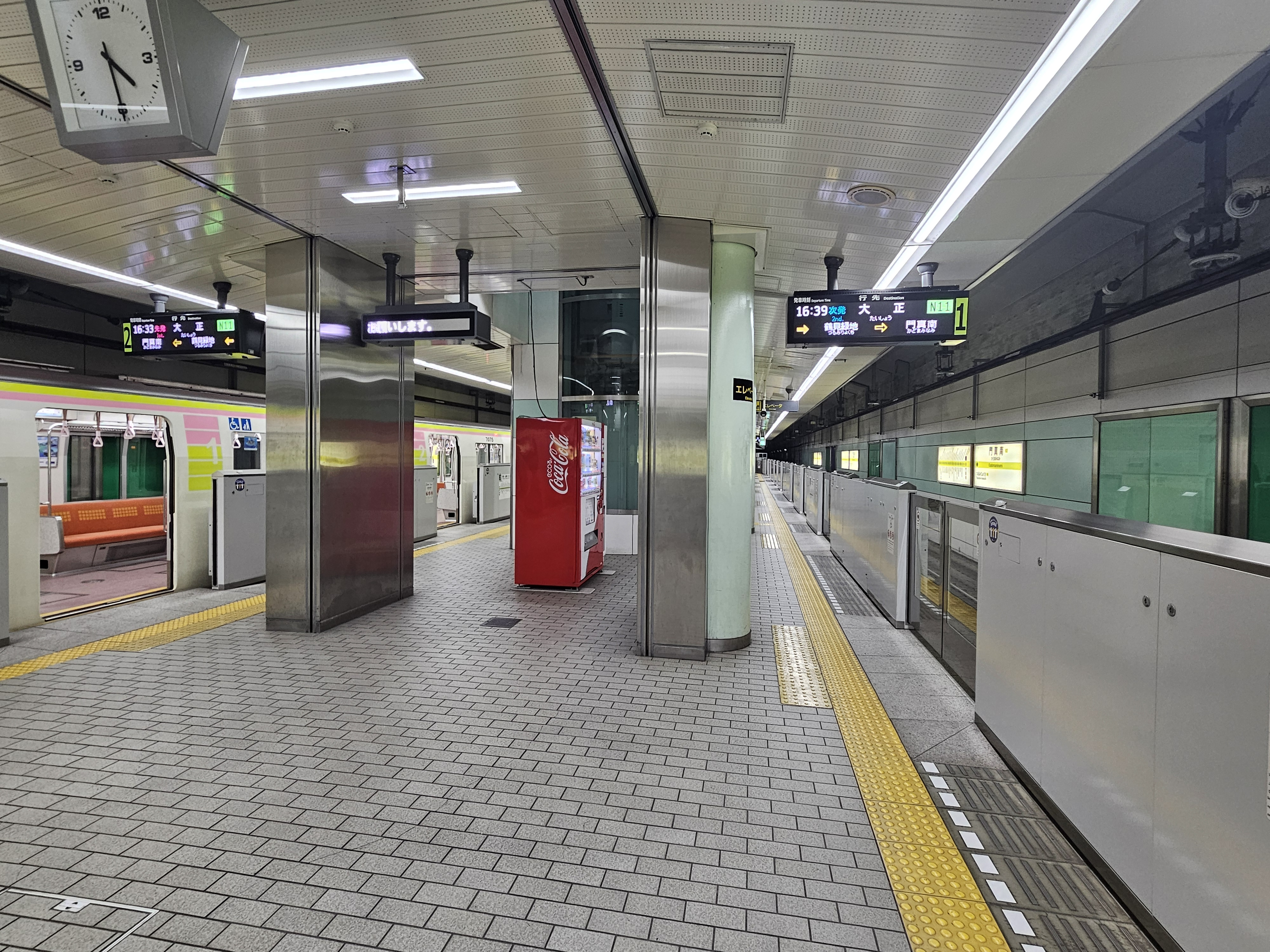
- Platform of the station (January 2025)

General information
- Location: 2-26 Mitsushima, Kadoma-shi, Osaka-fu 571-0015; Japan
- Coordinates: 34°43′01″N 135°35′33″E
- System: Osaka Metro
- Operator: Osaka Metro
- Line: Nagahori Tsurumi-ryokuchi Line
- Distance: 15.0 km (9.3 miles) from Taisho
- Platforms: 1 island platform

Construction
- Structure type: Underground

Other information
- Status: Staffed
- Station code: N 27
- Website: Official website

History
- Opened: 29 October 1997

Passengers
- FY2019: 11,360 daily

Services
Preceding station	Osaka Metro	Following station
Tsurumi-ryokuchi N 26 towards Taishō	Nagahori Tsurumi-ryokuchi Line	Terminus
Location
- Location within Osaka Prefecture Location within Japan

Kadoma-minami Station (門真南駅, Kadoma-minami-eki; also "Kadomaminami", station number: N27) is an underground metro station located in the city of Kadoma, Osaka, Japan, operated by Osaka Metro.

== Lines ==
Kadoma-minami Station is a terminus of the Nagahori Tsurumi-ryokuchi Line, and is located 15.0 km from the opposing terminus of the line at Taishō Station.

== Station layout ==
The station has one underground island platform serving two tracks and fenced with platform gates.

== Platforms ==
1, 2	■ Nagahori Tsurumi-ryokuchi Line	for Kyobashi, Morinomiya, Shinsaibashi and Taisho

== History ==
The station was opened on October 29, 1997

=== Future plans ===
There are plans to extend the Osaka Monorail to this station by 2029.

== Passenger statistics ==
In fiscal 2019, the station was used by an average of 11,360 passengers daily.

== Surrounding area ==
- Towa Pharmaceutical RACTAB Dome
- Osaka Tsurumi Hanaki Regional Wholesale Market

== See also ==
- List of railway stations in Japan
