= Osaka Loop Line =

Railway line in Japan

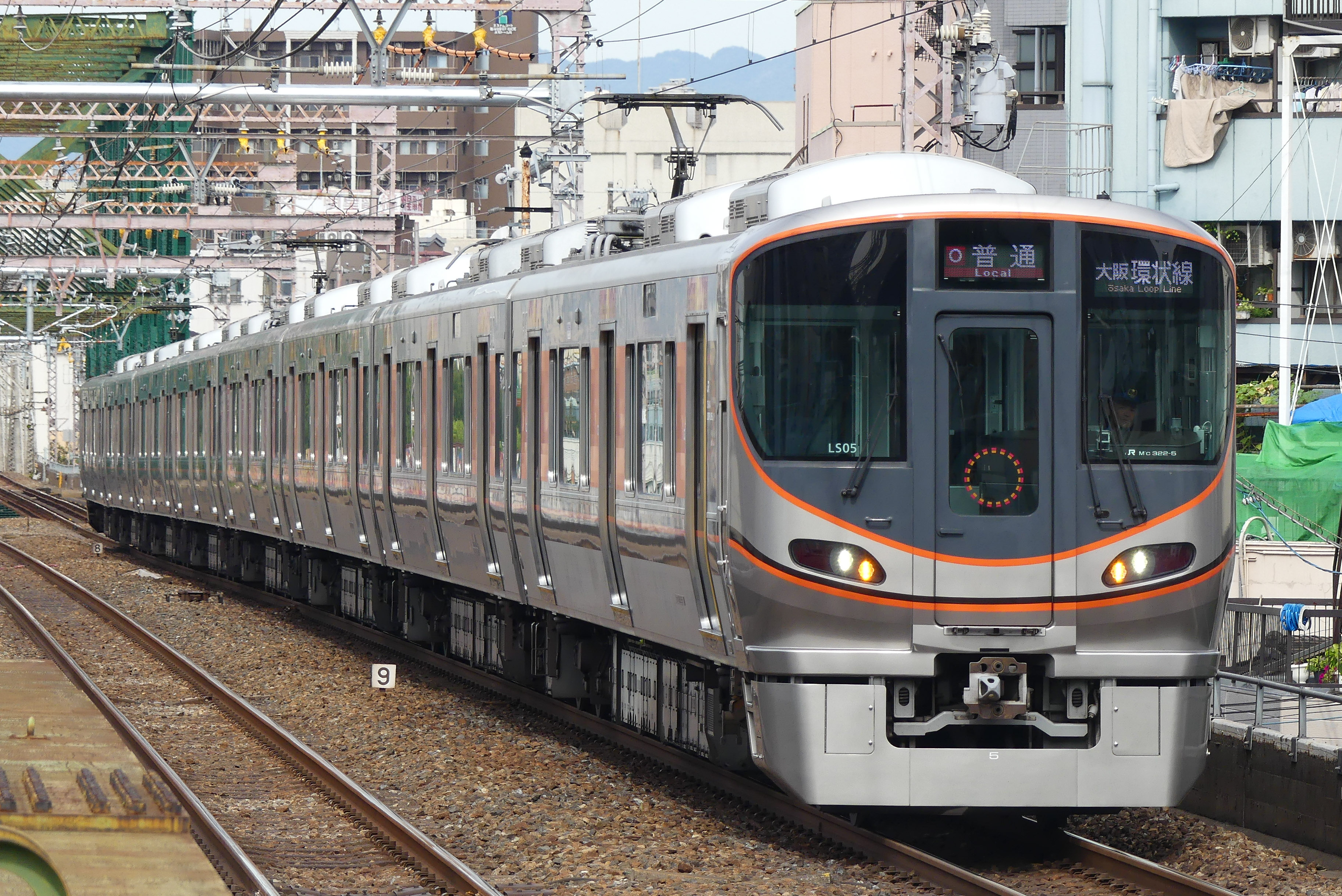
- A 323 series train on the Osaka Loop Line in September 2017

Overview
- Native name: 大阪環状線
- Owner: JR West
- Locale: Osaka, Japan
- Termini: Tennōji; Shin-Imamiya
- Stations: 19

Service
- Type: Heavy rail
- System: Urban network
- Operator(s): JR West; JR Freight
- Depot: Morinomiya
- Rolling stock: 323 series 221 series 223-0 series 223-2500 series 225-5000 series 271 series 281 series 283 series 287 series 289 series
- Daily ridership: 984,395 (FY2015)

History
- Opened: April 5, 1898; 128 years ago (first section); April 25, 1961; 65 years ago (entire line)

Technical
- Line length: 21.7 km (13.5 mi)
- Num of tracks: 3 (Fukushima — Nishikujo); 2 (other sections)
- Track gauge: 1,067 mm (3 ft 6 in)
- Electrification: 1,500 V DC (overhead line)
- Operating speed: 100 km/h (62 mph)
- Signalling: Automatic block signalling
- Train protection system: ATS-P
Route map
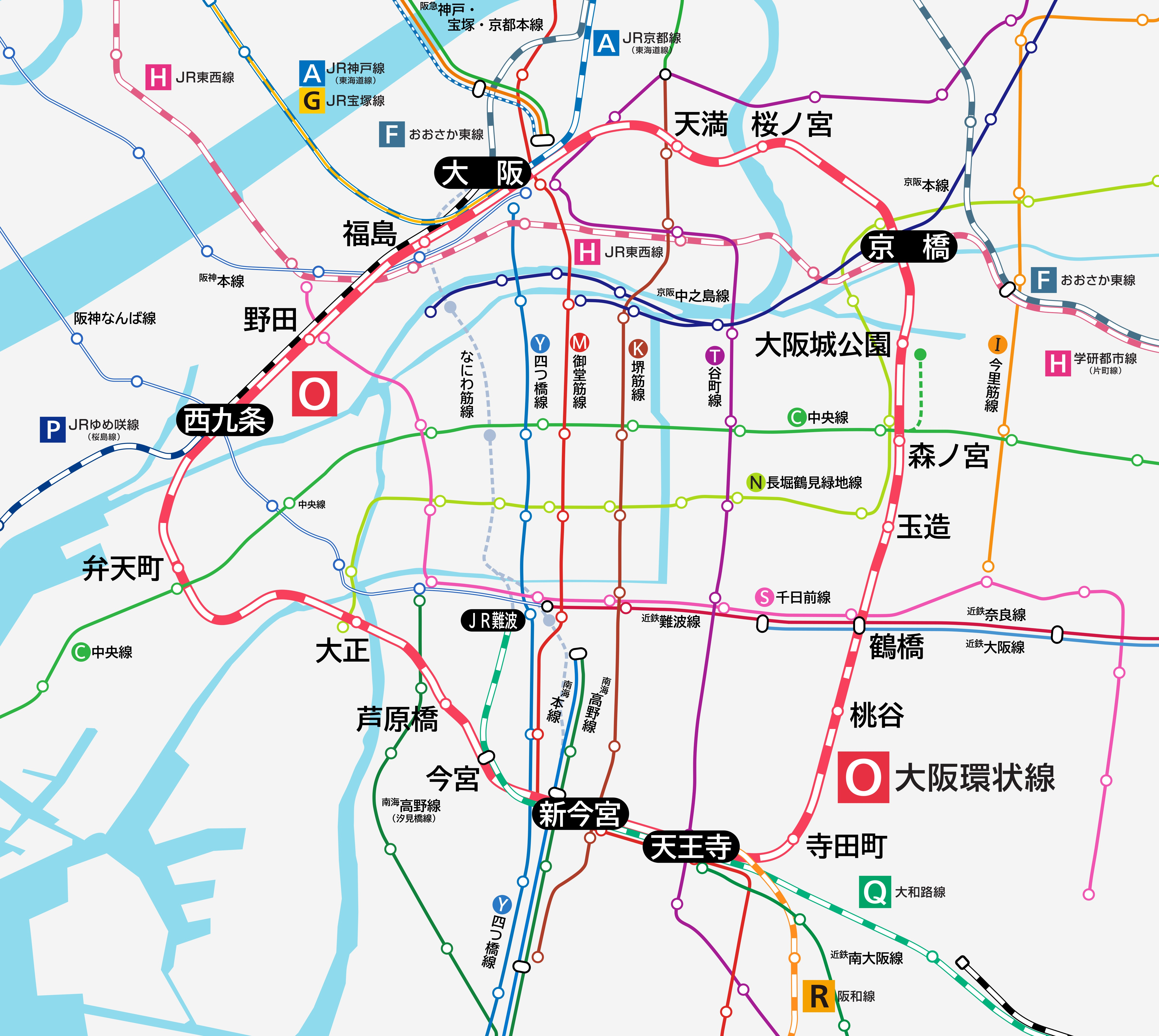

The Osaka Loop Line (大阪環状線, Ōsaka kanjō-sen) is a railway loop line in Japan operated by the West Japan Railway Company (JR West). It encircles central Osaka.

Part of a second, outer loop line, the Osaka Higashi Line, from Hanaten to Kyuhoji was opened on March 15, 2008, and the line from Shigino to Shin-Ōsaka opened in March 2019. This entry covers the original central loop line.

== Outline ==
The loop line consists of two tracks around the heart of metropolitan Osaka. All train services consist of eight cars, with distinctive orange color with white JR graphics on the front, rear and sides. The train schedule varies, but on average, two trains leave Tennōji Station and Ōsaka Station every five minutes, in opposite directions.

== Operation ==
On this line, JR West operates several types of trains. The line serves as a link between Ōsaka Station in northern Osaka (actually the Umeda district), and Tennōji in southern central Osaka. Some Limited Express trains linking north and south of the Osaka–Kobe–Kyoto area use the line as a bypass between the Tōkaidō Main Line in the north and the Hanwa Line in the south. Traffic is heavier in the eastern half, Osaka–Kyōbashi–Tennōji, than in the western half via Nishi-Kujō.

=== Direction ===
The completely loop shaped Osaka Loop Line is unable to use the "up" (上り, Nobori) and "down" (下り, Kudari) rail direction convention usually applied to JR lines. Instead, the words "outer loop" (running clockwise) (外回り, Soto mawari) and the "inner loop" (running counter-clockwise) (内回り, Uchi mawari) are used to refer to the direction of the train, similar to the Yamanote line in Tokyo.

For purposes of rail registration of the line at the Ministry of Land, Infrastructure, Transport and Tourism, the inner loop is considered "down".

=== Local ===
Local trains are operated all day. Some operate over the complete loop, while some serve the eastern half between Osaka and Tennōji via Kyōbashi.

Eight-car EMUs of 323 series are used. 221 series, 223 series and 225 series are used only for morning rush.

=== Sakurajima Line trains ===
Trains of the Sakurajima Line (JR Yumesaki Line) are now operated through to the loop line to/from Kyōbashi and Tennoji.

Eight-car 323 series EMUs are used.

=== Rapids of Kansai Main Line ===
Through trains to the Kansai Main Line (Yamatoji Line) began operating in 1973. "Yamatoji Rapid" (大和路快速, Yamatoji Kaisoku) and "Regional Rapid" (区間快速, Kukan Kaisoku) trains originate at Tennōji on the loop, passing the loop as "inner" via Osaka, and after stopping at Tennōji after a complete circuit, exit the loop onto the Kansai Main Line and terminate at Kamo, Nara or Ōji. In the loop, Yamatoji Rapids pass some stations while Regional Rapids stop all.

For "Yamatoji Rapid" and "Regional Rapid", usually 8-car and 4+4 car 221 series EMUs are used.

=== Rapids of Hanwa Line ===
Trains to the Hanwa Line, "Kansai Airport Rapid" (関空快速, Kankū Kaisoku) for Kansai Airport and Kishūji Rapid (紀州路快速, Kishūji Kaisoku) for Wakayama originate at either Tennoji or Kyobashi, and together with other types of rapid trains, operate on the inner loop via Osaka, pausing at Tennoji and then exiting from the loop. This pattern commenced in 1989, but increased significantly in 1994 on the opening of Kansai Airport.

8-car 223 series and 225 series EMUs in 4+4 formations are used for Kansai Airport and Kishūji rapids. 113 series 4-car units were used for rapids of Shin-Ōsaka - Kii-Tanabe in early morning and late night. They were withdrawn in 2010.

=== Limited express ===
Charged Limited Express services such as Haruka for Kansai International Airport, and south bound Kuroshio on the Hanwa Line and Kisei Main Line (Kinokuni Line) heading for the scenic southern Wakayama Prefecture utilize the Osaka Loop Line to bypass the Tōkaidō Main Line and reach the Hanwa Line. On the loop, aside from Tennōji, limited numbers of trains stop only at Nishi-Kujō.

Between the Tōkaidō Main Line and the Osaka Loop Line, trains utilize the Umeda Freight Line via a new underground route through Ōsaka Station, until it merges with the main line at Shin-Ōsaka. This route was introduced in 1989 on the completion of a bypass track from the Hanwa Line to platforms of the Kansai Main Line at Tennōji. Until then no through operations were possible from the Hanwa Line.

281 series and 271 series EMUs are used for Haruka, 283 series EMUs, 287 series EMUs and 289 series EMUs for Kuroshio.

=== Freight trains ===
After the abandonment of the Naniwa freight terminal, freight trains on the line operate only between Fukushima and Nishikujō, from the "Umeda Freight Line" to Ajikawaguchi on the Sakurajima Line (JR Yumesaki Line).

== Stations ==
Listed counterclockwise: All stations are in the city of Osaka, Osaka Prefecture.

No.	Station		Distance (km)	Transfers	Location
↑ Loop line towards Shin-Imamiya ↑
JR-O01	Tennōji	天王寺	11.0	Yamatoji Line (JR-Q20, Kansai Main Line); Hanwa Line (JR-R20); Midōsuji Line (M23); Tanimachi Line (T27); Minami Osaka Line (Osaka Abenobashi: F01); Uemachi Line (Tennoji-ekimae: HN01); (Nankai Main Line Tennoji Branch - closed 1993)	Tennōji
JR-O02	Teradachō	寺田町	12.0		Tennōji
JR-O03	Momodani	桃谷	13.2		Tennōji
JR-O04	Tsuruhashi	鶴橋	14.0	Nara Line (A04); Osaka Line (D04); Sennichimae Line (S19)	Tennōji
JR-O05	Tamatsukuri	玉造	14.9	Nagahori Tsurumi-ryokuchi Line (N19)	Tennōji
JR-O06	Morinomiya	森ノ宮	15.8	Chūō Line (C19); Nagahori Tsurumi-ryokuchi Line (N20)	Chūō
JR-O07	Osakajō-kōen	大阪城公園	16.7		Jōtō
JR-O08	Kyōbashi	京橋	17.5	Gakkentoshi Line/JR Tōzai Line (JR-H41); Keihan Main Line (KH03); Nagahori Tsurumi-ryokuchi Line (N22)	Jōtō
JR-O09	Sakuranomiya	桜ノ宮	19.3		Miyakojima
JR-O10	Temma	天満	20.1	Sakaisuji Line (Ōgimachi: K12)	Kita
JR-O11	Ōsaka	大阪	0.0	JR Kyōto Line/JR Kobe Line (JR-A47); JR Takarazuka Line (JR-G47); Osaka Higashi Line (JR-F01); JR Tōzai Line (Kitashinchi: JR-H44); Kōbe Main Line (Osaka-umeda: HK-01); Kyōto Main Line (Osaka-umeda: HK-01); Takarazuka Main Line (Osaka-umeda: HK-01); Main Line (Osaka-umeda: HS01); Midōsuji Line (Umeda: M16); Tanimachi Line (Higashi-Umeda: T20); Yotsubashi Line (Nishi-Umeda: Y11)	Kita
JR-O12	Fukushima	福島	1.0	JR Tōzai Line (Shin-Fukushima: JR-H45); Main Line (HS02); Nakanoshima Line (Nakanoshima: KH54)	Fukushima
JR-O13	Noda	野田	2.4	Sennichimae Line (Tamagawa: S12)	Fukushima
JR-O14	Nishikujō	西九条	3.6	JR Yumesaki Line (JR-P14); Hanshin Namba Line (HS45)	Konohana
JR-O15	Bentenchō	弁天町	5.2	Chūō Line (C13)	Minato
JR-O16	Taishō	大正	7.0	Nagahori Tsurumi-ryokuchi Line (N11)	Taishō
JR-O17	Ashiharabashi	芦原橋	8.2		Naniwa
JR-O18	Imamiya	今宮	8.8	Yamatoji Line (JR-Q18)	Naniwa
JR-O19	Shin-Imamiya	新今宮	10.0	Yamatoji Line (JR-Q19); Nankai Main Line (NK03); Kōya Line (NK03); Hankai Line (Minami-Kasumichō: HN52); Dōbutsuen-mae: Midōsuji Line (M22) Sakaisuji Line (K19)	Naniwa
↓ Loop line towards Tennōji ↓

=== Stopping patterns ===
Stations

- ● : All trains stop.
- ▲ : Stop, outer loop (Tennoji → Nishikujo → Osaka → Kyobashi → Tennoji)
- Number: Track (Platform) numbers to arrive at and depart from.
- | : All trains skip

Station	Local 普通	Local 普通	Regional Rapid 区間快速	Yamatoji Rapid 大和路快速	Direct Rapid 直通快速	Rapid 快速	Kishuji Rapid 紀州路快速	Kansai Airport Rapid 関空快速
Tennoji	● 11-14	● 11-14	● 11-14	● 11-14	▲13, 14	● 11-14	● 11-14	● 11-14
Teradacho	●	●	●	●	▲	●	●	●
Momodani	●	●	●	●	▲	●	●	●
Tsuruhashi	●	●	●	●	▲	●	●	●
Tamatsukuri	●	●	●	●	▲	●	●	●
Morinomiya	●	●	●	●	▲	●	●	●
Osakajokoen	●	●	●	●	▲	●	●	●
Kyobashi	●	●	●	●	▲	●	●	●
Sakuranomiya	●	●	●	●	▲	●	●	●
Temma	●	●	●	●	▲	●	●	●
Osaka	●	●	●	●	▲	●	●	●
Fukushima	●	●	●	●	▲	●	●	●
Noda	●	●	●	|	▲	|	|	|
Nishikujo	●	●	●	●	▲	●	●	●
Bentencho	●		●	●	▲	●	●	●
Taisho	●		●	●	▲	●	●	●
Ashiharabashi	●		●	|	▲	|	|	|
Imamiya	●		●	|	▲	|	|	|
Shin-Imamiya	● 1, 4		● 2, 3	● 2-4	▲3, 4	● 2-4	● 2-4	● 2-4
Tennoji	● 11, 14		● 15-18	● 15-18	▲18	● 15, 18	● 15, 18	● 15, 18
Through to/from	Loop service in Osaka Loop Line	JR Yumesaki Line	Yamatoji Line		Hanwa Line			Hanwa Line & Kansai Airport Line

== Rolling stock ==
=== Local ===
- 323 series (since 24 December 2016)

The first of a fleet of 21 new 323 series eight-car EMU trains were introduced from 24 December 2016, scheduled to entirely replace the fleet of 23 103 and 201 series trains by 2018. As of December 2021, few of the remaining 103 series (from Nara Line) and 201 series (Osaka Higashi & Yamatoji Line) continue to be used on the Loop Line.

=== Yamatoji Rapid, Regional Rapid ===
- 221 series

=== Kansai Airport Rapid, Kishūji Rapid, Direct Rapid and Local ===
- 223 series (0 and 2500 subseries)
- 225 series (5000 and 5100 subseries)

=== Limited express ===
- 271 series (Haruka service, from Spring 2020)
- 281 series (Haruka service)
- 283 series (Kuroshio service)
- 287 series (Kuroshio service)
- 289 series (Kuroshio service)

=== Freight ===
Locomotives seen hauling freight trains include the M250 series, EF65, EF66, EF81, EF210 and DE10.

=== Former ===
==== Passenger ====
- 72 series
- 101 series (March 22, 1964 – April 28, 1991)
- 103 series (1969 – 3 October 2017)
- 113 series (until December 10, 2011)
- 381 series (Kuroshio service, until October 30, 2015)
- 201 series (2005 – 7 June 2019)
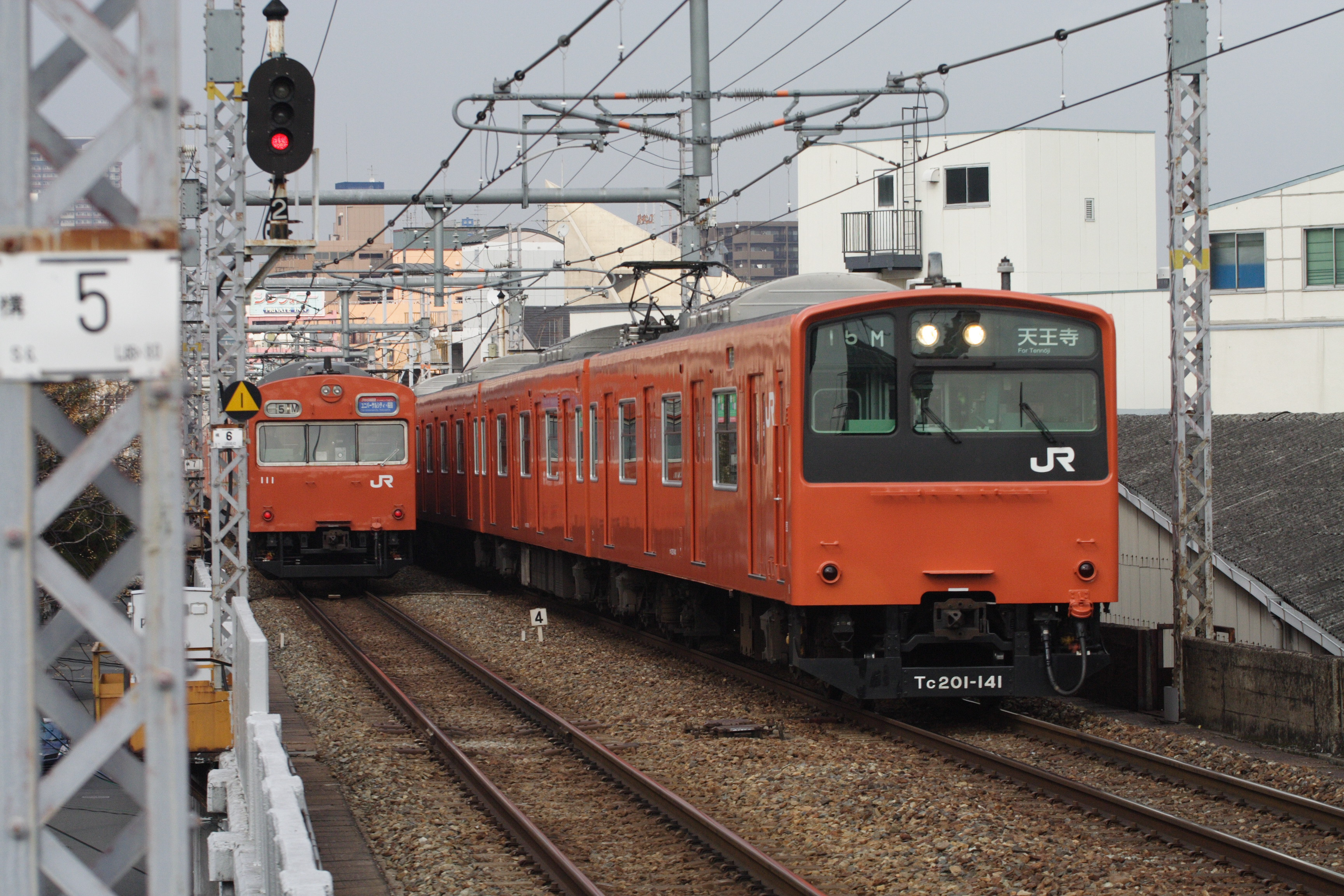
103 series (left) and 201 series EMUs

==== Freight ====
- DD51

== Fares ==
A special discount rate is applied for travels within the Osaka Loop Line, the Sakurajima Line and the segment between JR Namba Station and Tennōji Station of the Kansai Main Line (collectively called the Osaka Loop Zone (大阪環状線内, Ōsaka Kanjōsen-nai)). The following table is the rate for adult single-ride tickets. (Note: Fractions of one kilometre are rounded up to the nearest full kilometre.)

Kilometre	Yen
1–3	120
4–6	160
7–10	170
11–15	190
16–20	260

For travel between a station within the zone and a station out of the zone or between two stations out of the zone, fares are calculated in accordance with a universal fare table and the discount rate as above is not applicable.

For the calculation of the fare for travel between two stations out of the zone that includes the segment between Ōsaka Station and Tennōji Station of the Osaka Loop Line, where two routes (10.7 km or 6.6 mi route via Temma and 11.0 km or 6.8 mi route via Fukushima) are practical, the shorter route is always used irrespective of the actual travel route.

== History ==
=== Osaka Railway (Kansai Main Line) ===
The Osaka Railway network in June 1900, prior to the creation of the Kansai Main Line. The inset map shows the eastern portion of the present-day Osaka Loop Line and branch to the Osaka Arsenal (red), as well as the separate Nishinari Line and other connecting lines.

The earliest section of the present-day Osaka Loop Line opened on 14 May 1889 as the Osaka Railway (大阪鉄道, Osaka Tetsudō) from Kashiwara to Minatomachi (湊町; present JR Namba) via Tennōji. This line included the section of the present-day Osaka Loop Line between Tennōji and Imamiya. Imamiya Station, between Tennōji and Minatomachi, opened on 1 March 1899. This line officially became part of the Kansai Main Line (a JGR intercity line to Nagoya) in 1909.

In 1928, an 8.4 km freight branch line opened to connect Imamiya to Osaka Port, with stops at Naniwa and Osaka-Minato. A second branch line from Naniwa to Osaka-Toko opened in 1956. The former Osaka-Minato and Osaka-Tōkō stations were closed in 1984.

=== Jōtō Line ===
The eastern half of the Osaka Loop Line, between Ōsaka and Tennōji via Kyōbashi, was originally part of the Osaka Railway. The 3.78 segment between Tennoji and Tamatsukuri opened on 28 May 1895, and was extended by 7.02 km to Umeda, via Kyobashi and Temma, on 17 October 1895. A branch line to the Osaka Arsenal opened in December 1896 and was operational through World War II until 1947. Sakuranomiya Station opened in April 1898.

The Osaka Railway merged with the Kansai Railway (関西鉄道, Kansai Tetsudō; also read as Kansei or Kwansai) in 1900, creating a single entity for the line from Tennōji to Ōsaka and merging the line's Umeda terminal with JGR Osaka Station. The Japanese government acquired the Kansai Railway in 1907 under the 1906 Railway Nationalization Act, and in 1909 the line was named the Jōtō Line (城東線, Jōtō sen). The northern portion of the line was upgraded to dual trackage between 1913 and 1914, and the entire line was electrified in February 1933.

=== Nishinari Line ===
The Nishinari Railway in November 1906.

The northwestern quarter of the Osaka Loop Line, between Osaka and Nishi-Kujō, was built by the Nishinari Railway (西成鉄道, Nishinari Tetsudō) to provide rail access to the Osaka Port. In 1898, the company opened the Osaka – Ajikawaguchi line, which was leased to JGR in 1904. In 1906 the company was nationalized under the act of the same year. In 1909, the line was named the "Nishinari Line" (西成線, Nishinari sen) which included the present-day Sakurajima Line. The Nishinari Line was electrified in 1941, and began through service with the Joto Line in 1943.

=== Combination as Osaka Loop Line ===
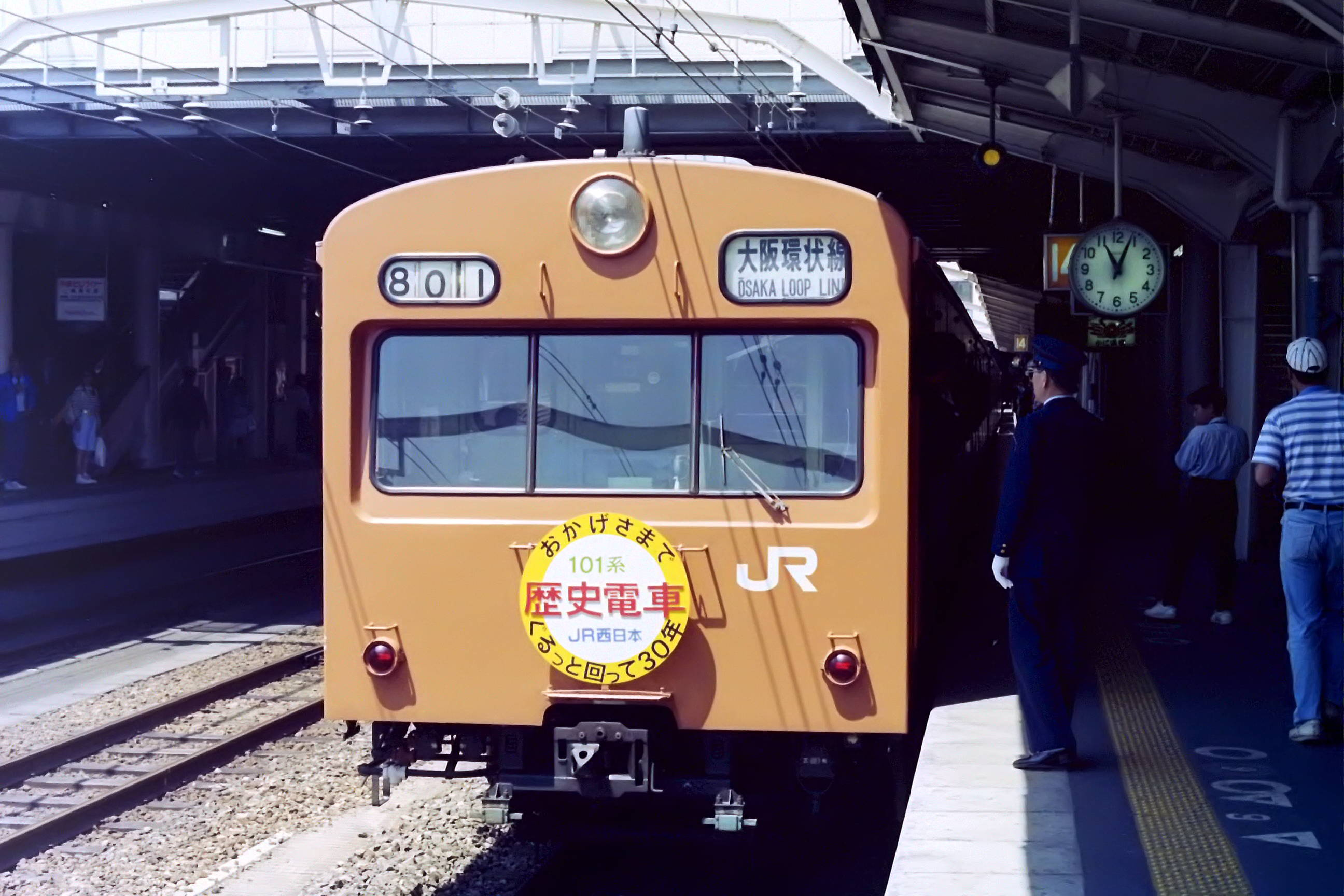
A 101 series train with head marking celebrating the 30th anniversary of the Loop Line (1991). This type, in orange livery, was ubiquitous on the line from the 1960s through the 1980s.

The Osaka Loop Line was formally created on 25 April 1961 by the merger of the existing lines with new tracks between Nishi-Kujō and Sakaigawa Signal Box. This new section, together with the entire Jōtō Line and the Osaka – Nishi-Kujō section of the Nishinari Line, became the Osaka Loop Line, while the Nishi-Kujō – Sakurajima section of the Nishinari Line became the Sakurajima Line. Initially, the two lines operated together in the shape of a mirrored "6," with trains operating Sakurajima – Nishi-Kujō – Osaka – Kyōbashi – Tennōji – Nishi-Kujō and vice versa. Elevated tracks at Nishi-Kujo and double tracks between Osaka and Fukushima opened in March 1964, allowing stand-alone operation of the Osaka Loop Line for the first time.

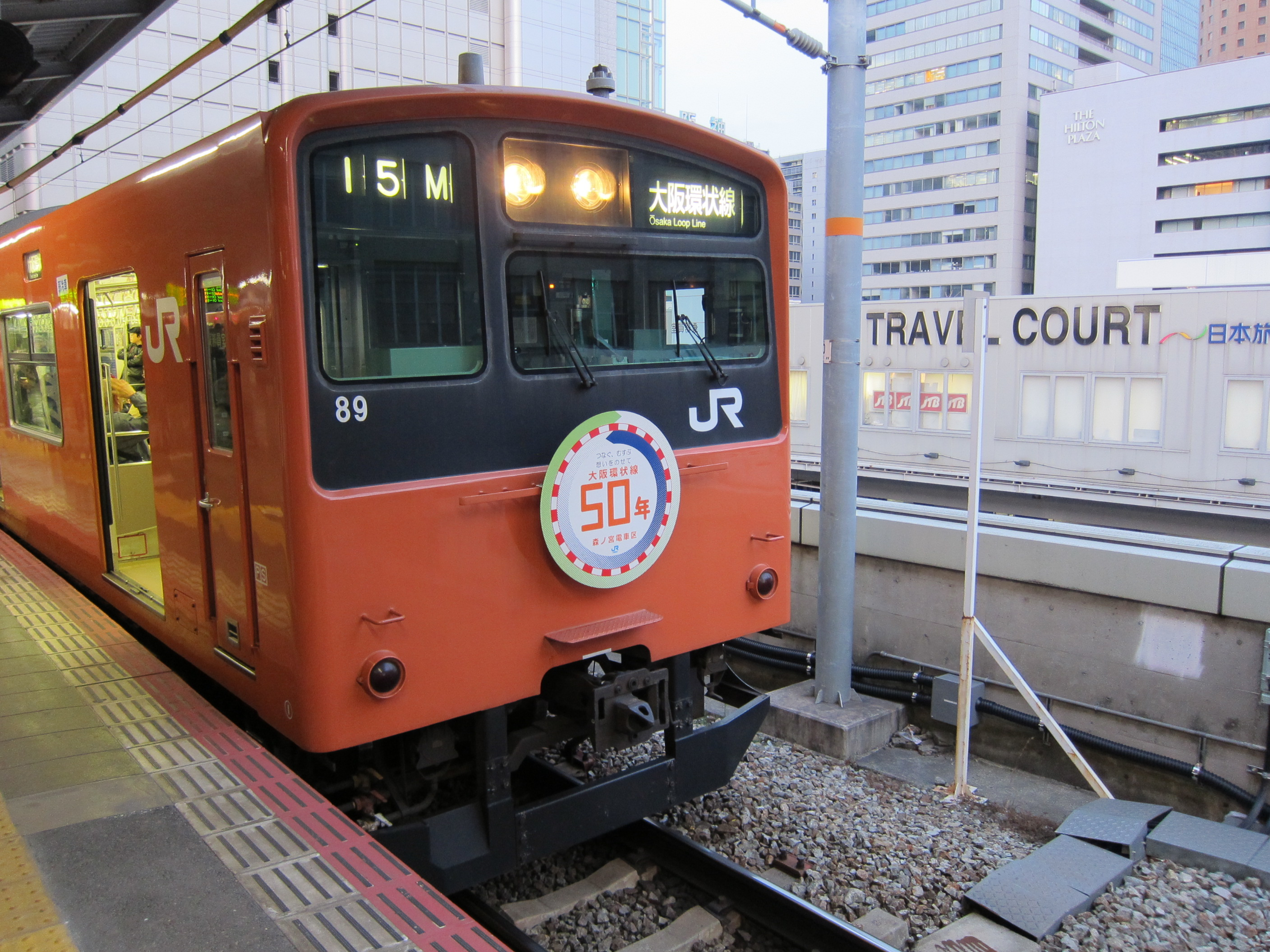
A 201 series train decorated for the 50th anniversary of the Loop Line (2012).

The Tennōji – Shin-Imamiya section was quadrupled in 1968, to separate operations from the Kansai Main Line. Rapid through service between the Osaka Loop Line and Kansai Main Line began on weekends and holidays in 1973 and was extended to weekdays in 1974.

Yamatoji Liner services were added in 1988, and airport rapid and limited express services were added in September 1994 upon the opening of Kansai International Airport.

== See also ==
- Yamanote Line
- Osaka Higashi Line
