= Sakuranomiya Station =

Railway station in Osaka, Japan

Coordinates: 34°42′17.71″N 135°31′13.16″E

Sakuranomiya Station 桜ノ宮駅
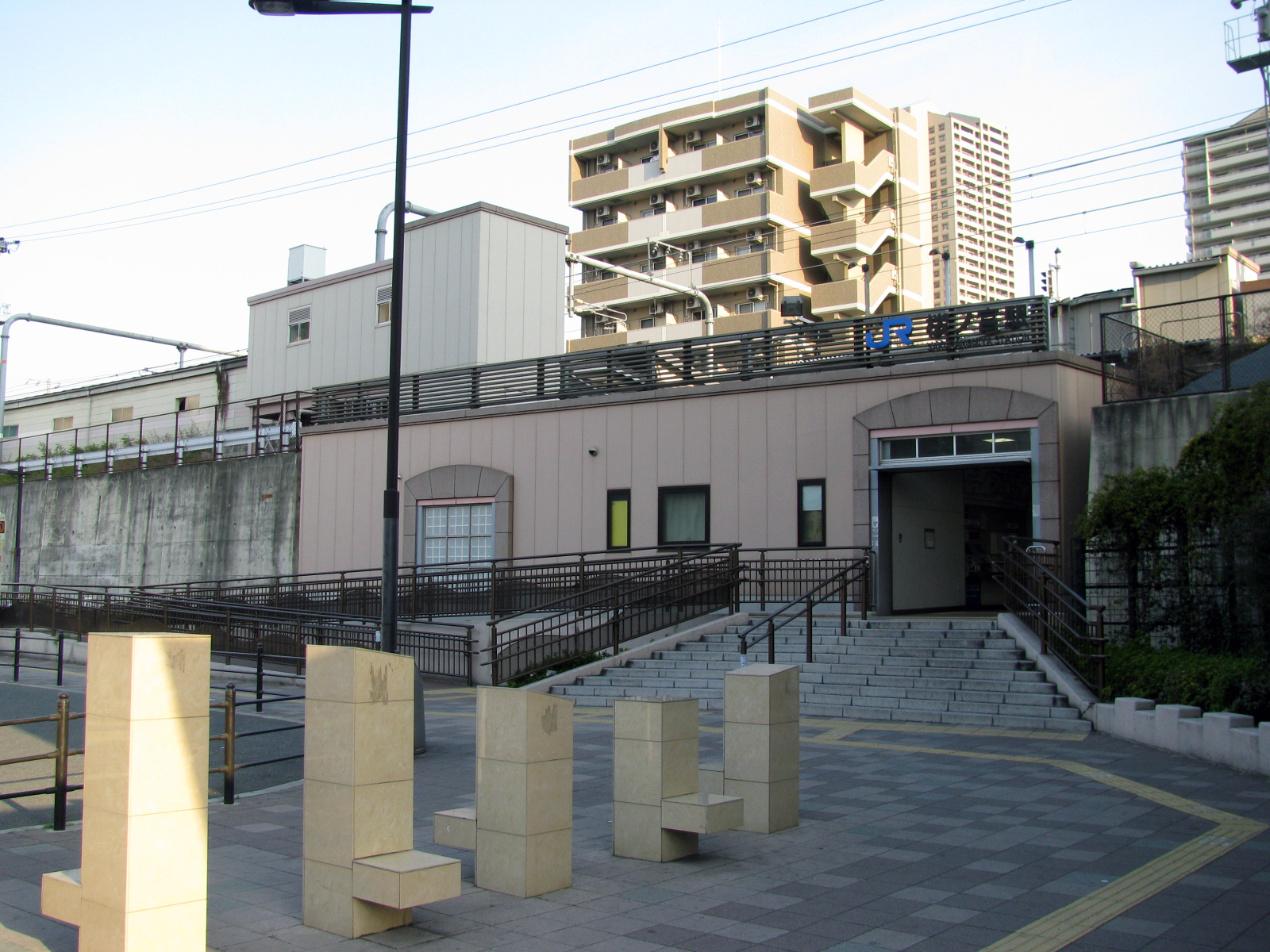

General information
- Location: Miyakojima, Osaka, Osaka; Japan
- Operator: JR West
- Line: Osaka Loop Line

Other information
- Station code: JR-O09

History
- Opened: 1898
Location

Sakuranomiya Station (桜ノ宮駅, Sakuranomiya-eki) is a train station on the West Japan Railway Company (JR West) Osaka Loop Line in Miyakojima-ku, Osaka, Japan.

== Layout ==
There are two side platforms with two tracks elevated.

1	■ Osaka Loop Line	inner track for Ōsaka and Nishikujō
2	■ Osaka Loop Line	outer track for Kyōbashi and Tsuruhashi

== History ==
The station opened on 27 April 1898 on the exiting railway that would be called the Osaka Loop Line. Between 21 December 1901 and 15 November 1913, the Sakuranomiya Line connected Sakuranomiya and Hanaten Station on the present-day Katamachi Line.

Station numbering was introduced in March 2018 with Sakuranomiya being assigned station number JR-O09.

== Surrounding area ==
- Osaka City General Hospital
- Miyakojima Station (Osaka Municipal Subway Tanimachi Line)
- Osaka Amenity Park (OAP)

== Adjacent stations ==
«	Service	»
Osaka Loop Line
Kyōbashi	All types	Temma

=== Past railway line ===
«	Service	»
Japanese Government Railway Sakuranomiya Line (1901–1913)
Amijima	-	Terminus
