= Miyakojima (disambiguation) =

Miyakojima may refer to:

- Miyako Island
- Miyakojima, Okinawa
- Miyakojima-ku, Osaka
