= Kansai Airport Line =

Railway line between Hineno Station and Kansai Airport Station in Japan

Coordinates: 34°26′6.96″N 135°14′39.85″E

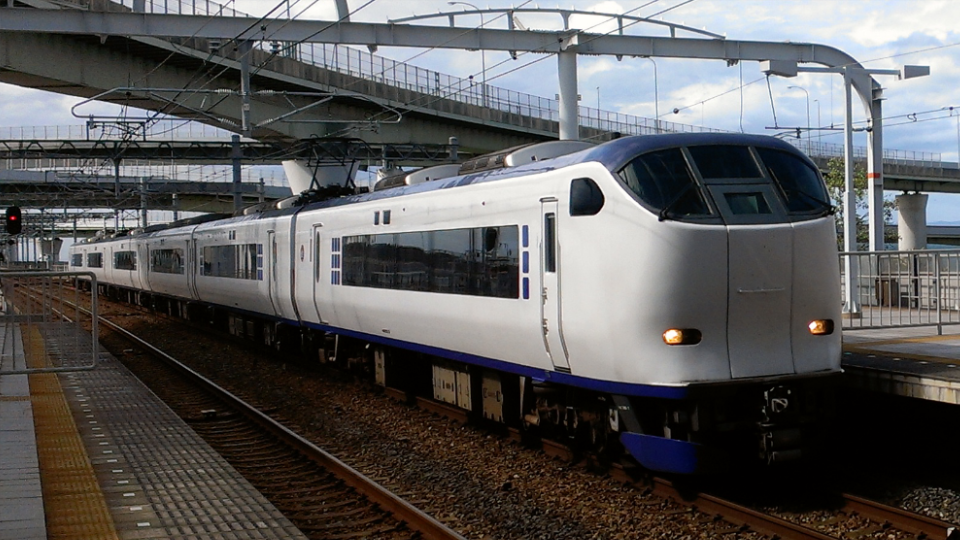
- Kansai Airport Limited Express Haruka at Rinkū Town Station

Overview
- Native name: 関西空港線
- Owner: JR West (Hineno–Rinkū Town); New Kansai International Airport Co., Ltd. (Rinkū Town–Kansai Airport)
- Locale: Osaka Prefecture
- Termini: Hineno; Kansai Airport
- Stations: 3

Service
- Type: Heavy rail
- System: Urban Network
- Operator(s): JR West
- Rolling stock: 223-0 series EMU; 223-2500 series EMU; 225-5000 series EMU; 271 series EMU; 281 series EMU

History
- Opened: 1994; 32 years ago

Technical
- Line length: 11.1 km (6.9 mi)
- Track gauge: 1,067 mm (3 ft 6 in)
- Electrification: 1,500 V DC (overhead lines)
- Operating speed: 130 km/h (81 mph)

The Kansai Airport Line (関西空港線, Kansai-Kūkō-sen) is a railway line between Hineno Station and Kansai Airport Station in Japan, operated by the West Japan Railway Company (JR West) and owned by Kansai International Airport Co., Ltd. between Rinkū Town and Kansai Airport. It opened on 15 June 1994.

== Destinations ==
The Kansai Airport Line is the JR West rail line connecting Kansai International Airport (KIX) with the broader JR rail network in the Kansai region. Trains running on this line provide both rapid commuter and limited-express airport access services, with through service to the Hanwa Line and Osaka Loop Line to serve major urban destinations.

== Basic data ==
- Railway signalling: Automatic
- CTC centers: Kansai Airport Operation Control Center
- CTC system: Kansai airport line CTC

== Rolling stock ==
- Local (Shuttle) and rapid service trains use 4-car 223-0/223-2500 series and 225-5000/225-5100 series trainsets.
- Kansai Airport Limited Express Haruka use 6- or 9-car 271 series and 281 series trainsets.
- Nankai Electric Railway trains use the track between Rinkū Town and Kansai Airport.
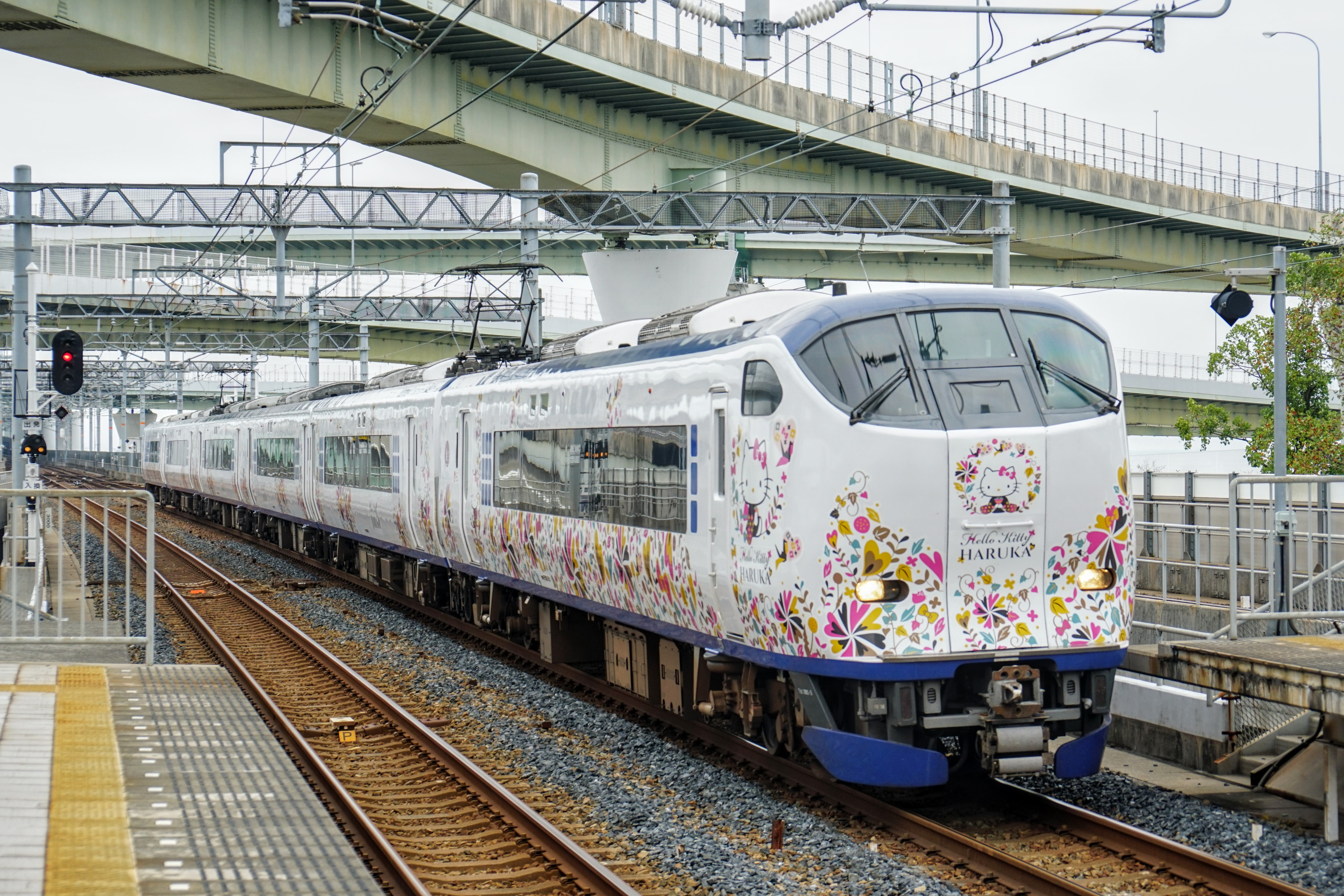
281 series

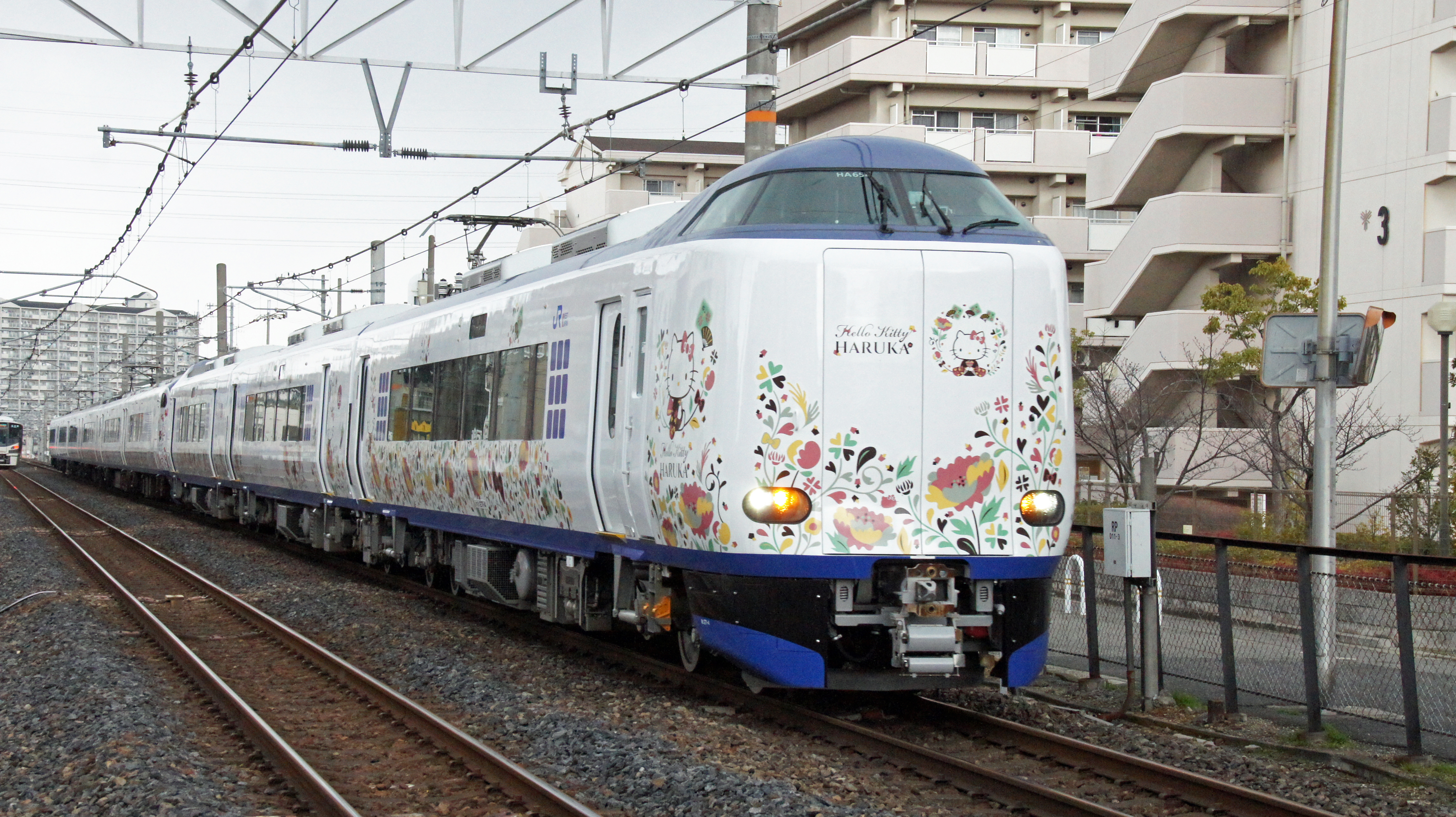
271 series

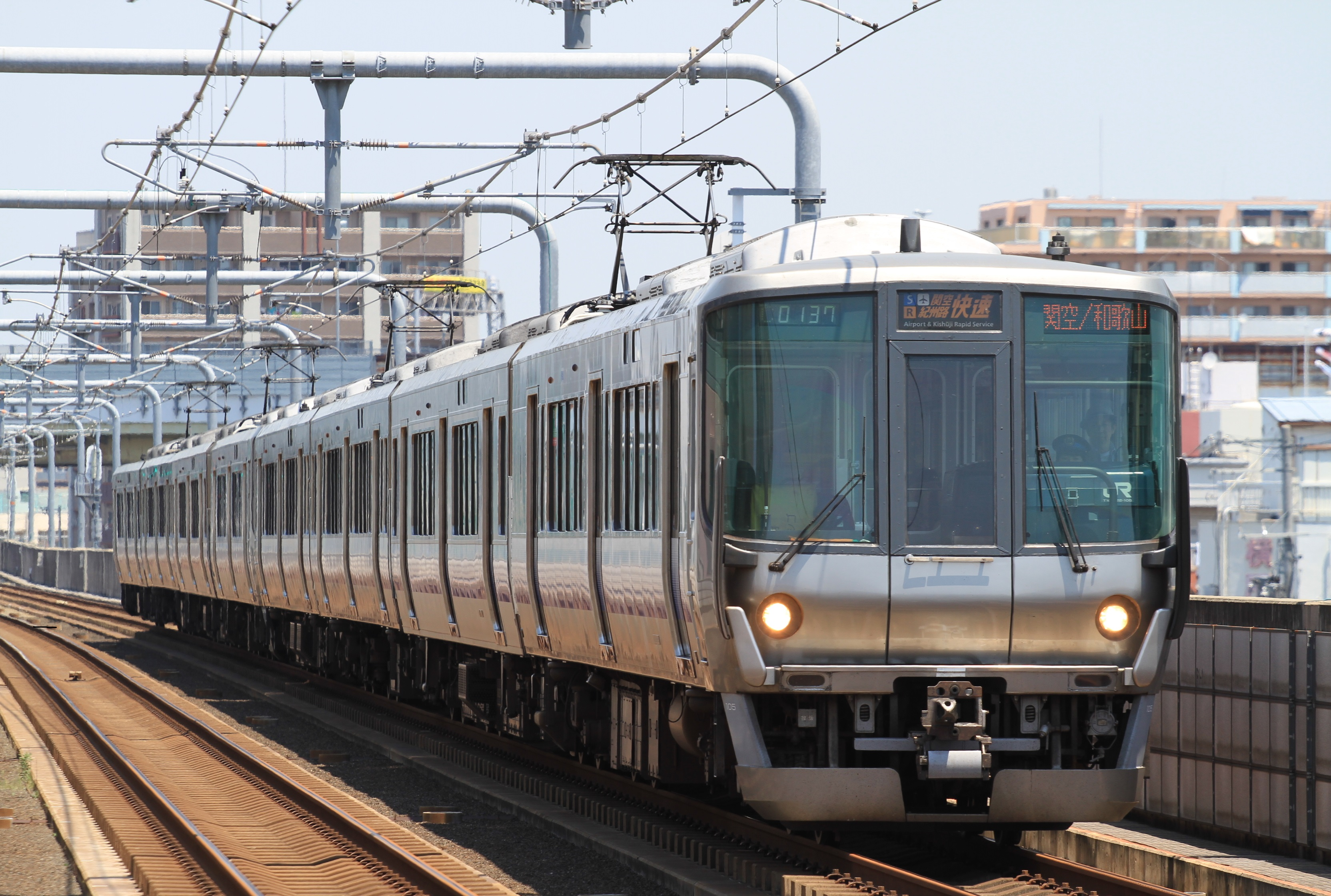
223-0 series

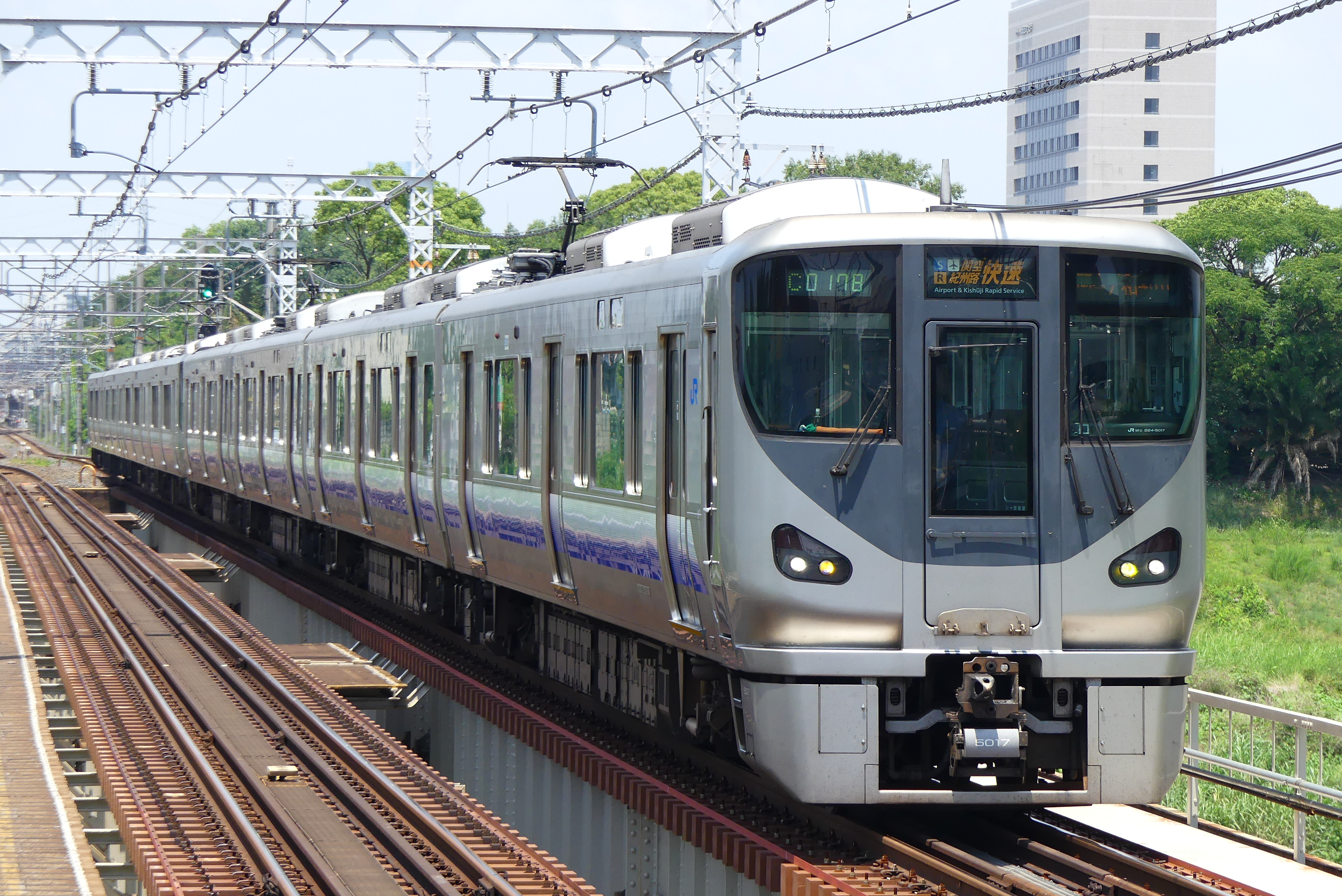
225-5000 series

== Stations ==
No.	Station	Japanese	Transfers	Location	
Through service:			From Hineno: Kansai Airport Rapid & Direct Rapid for Tennōji, Ōsaka and Kyōbashi via R Hanwa Line and O Osaka Loop Line; Kansai Airport Limited Express Haruka for Tennōji, Ōsaka, Shin-Osaka and Kyoto via R Hanwa Line and A JR Kyoto Line		
JR-S45	Hineno	日根野	R Hanwa Line (for Wakayama)	Izumisano	Osaka Prefecture
JR-S46	Rinkū Town	りんくうタウン	Nankai Airport Line (NK31)	Izumisano	Osaka Prefecture
JR-S47	Kansai Airport	関西空港	Nankai Airport Line (NK32)	Tajiri	Osaka Prefecture

== History ==
The Kansai Airport Line opened on 15 June 1994. In accordance with Japan's Railway Business Act, JR West is a Category-2 operator between Kansai Airport Station and Rinku Town Station.

Station numbering was introduced to the line in March 2018 with stations on the line being assigned JR-S45 through JR-S47.
