= 281 series =

Japanese train type

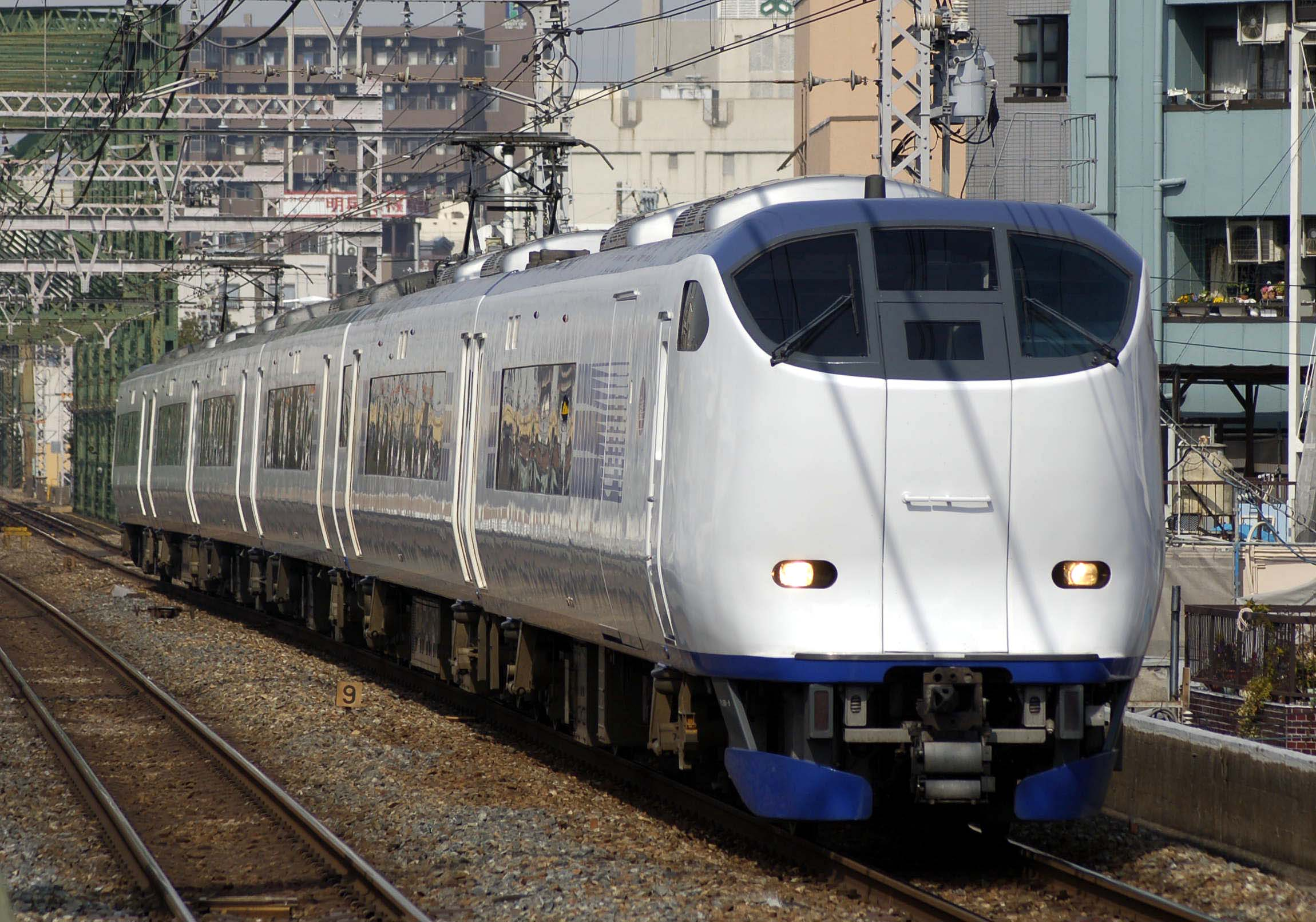
- A 281 series train
- Manufacturers: Kawasaki Heavy Industries, Kinki Sharyo
- Family name: Haruka
- Constructed: 1994–1995
- Entered service: 4 September 1994
- Number built: 63 vehicles
- Number in service: 63 vehicles
- Formation: 6/3 cars per trainset
- Fleet numbers: HA601 – HA609, HA631 – HA633
- Capacity: 258
- Operator: JR-West
- Depot: Hineno
- Lines served: Tokaido Main Line, Osaka Loop Line, Hanwa Line, Kansai Airport Line

Specifications
- Car body construction: Steel
- Car length: 20.74 m (68 ft 1 in) (end cars); 20 m (65 ft 7 in) (intermediate cars)
- Width: 2.92 m (9 ft 7 in)
- Height: 3.55 m (11 ft 8 in)
- Maximum speed: 130 km/h (81 mph)
- Traction system: Variable frequency (3-level GTO)
- Acceleration: 1.8 km/(h⋅s) (1.1 mph/s)
- Electric system: 1,500 V DC overhead
- Current collection: WPS27D scissors-type pantograph
- Bogies: WDT55 (motored); WTR239 (trailer)
- Braking systems: Regenerative brake, electronically controlled pneumatic brakes, snow-resistant brake
- Safety systems: ATS-P, ATS-SW
- Multiple working: 271 series
- Track gauge: 1,067 mm (3 ft 6 in)

The 281 series (281系, 281-kei) is a DC electric multiple unit (EMU) train type operated by West Japan Railway Company (JR-West). Introduced on September 4, 1994, it is used exclusively for Kansai Airport Limited Express Haruka services to and from Kansai International Airport. Provisions are made for luggage racks and dedicated luggage room.

== Design ==
Built jointly by Kinki Sharyo and Kawasaki Heavy Industries, the trains are used on the Haruka limited express service via the Kansai Airport Line in three- or six-car formations.

== Formations ==
Sets are based at Hineno Depot, and are formed as shown below.

=== 6-car sets ===
Car No.	1	2	3	4	5	6
Designation	Tsc	M	T	T1	M	Tc
Numbering	KuRo 280	MoHa 281	SaHa 281	SaHa 281-100	MoHa 281	KuHa 281

The MoHa 281 cars are each fitted with one WPS27D scissors-type pantograph.

=== 3-car sets ===
Car No.	7	8	9
Designation	Tc	T1	Mc
Numbering	KuHa 280	SaHa 281-100	KuMoHa 281

The KuMoHa 281 car is fitted with one WPS27D scissors-type pantograph.

== Interior ==
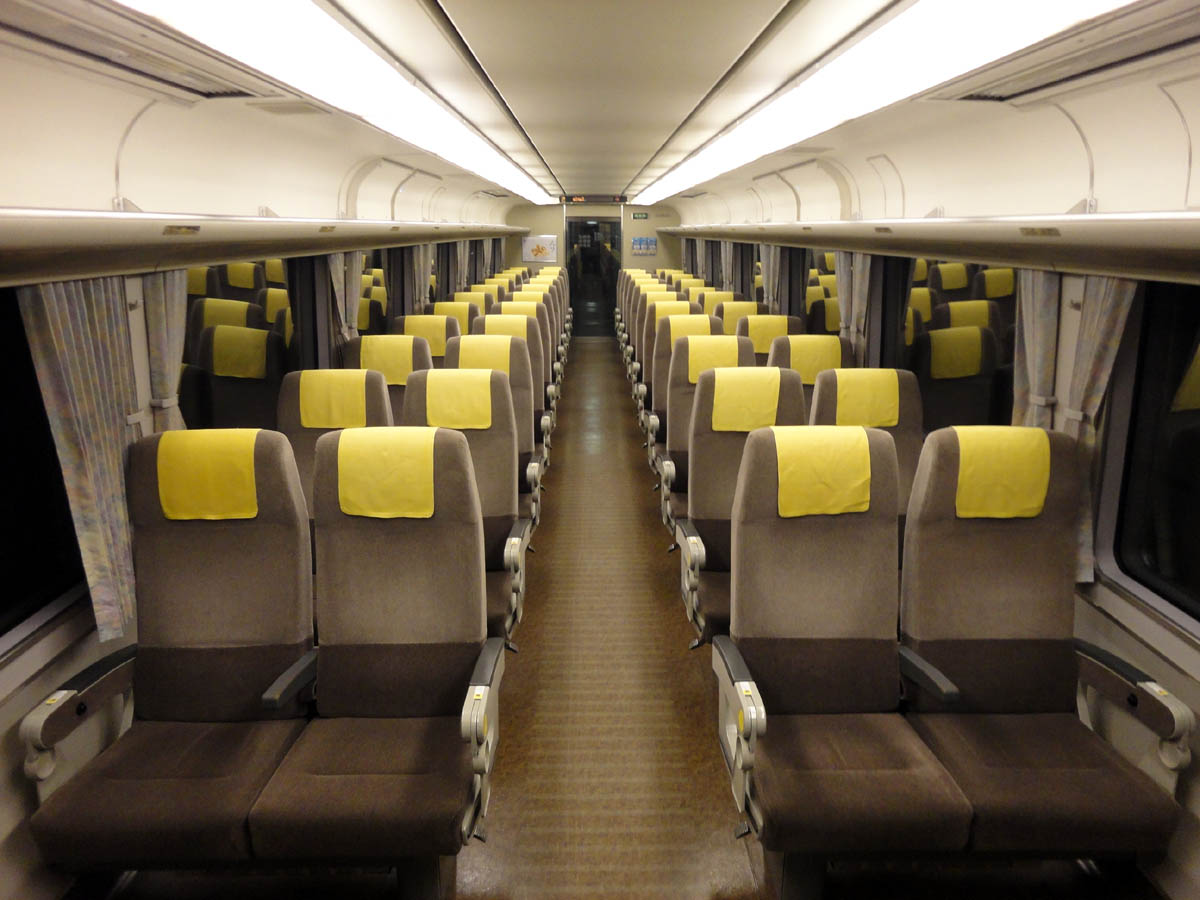
281 series standard-class interior

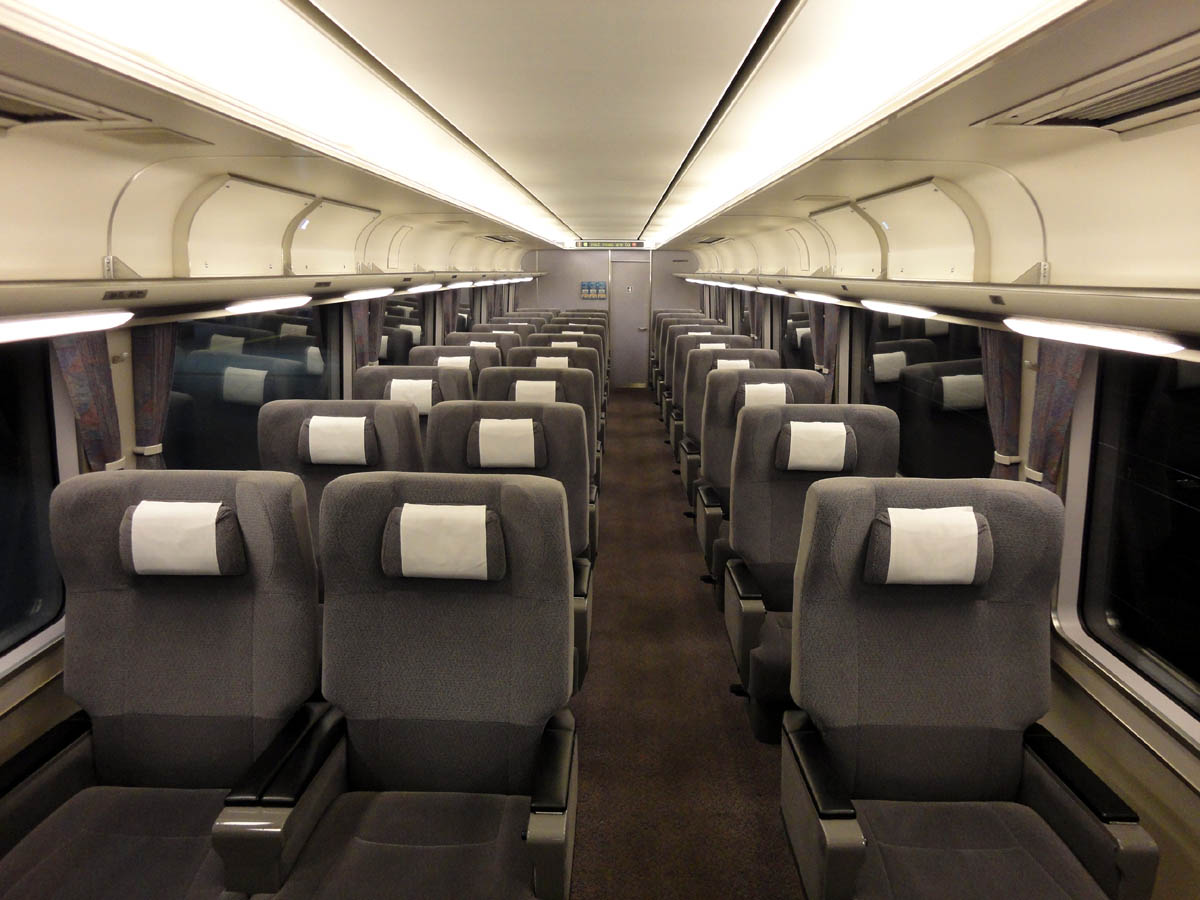
281 series Green (first class) car interior
