= 283 series =

Japanese train type

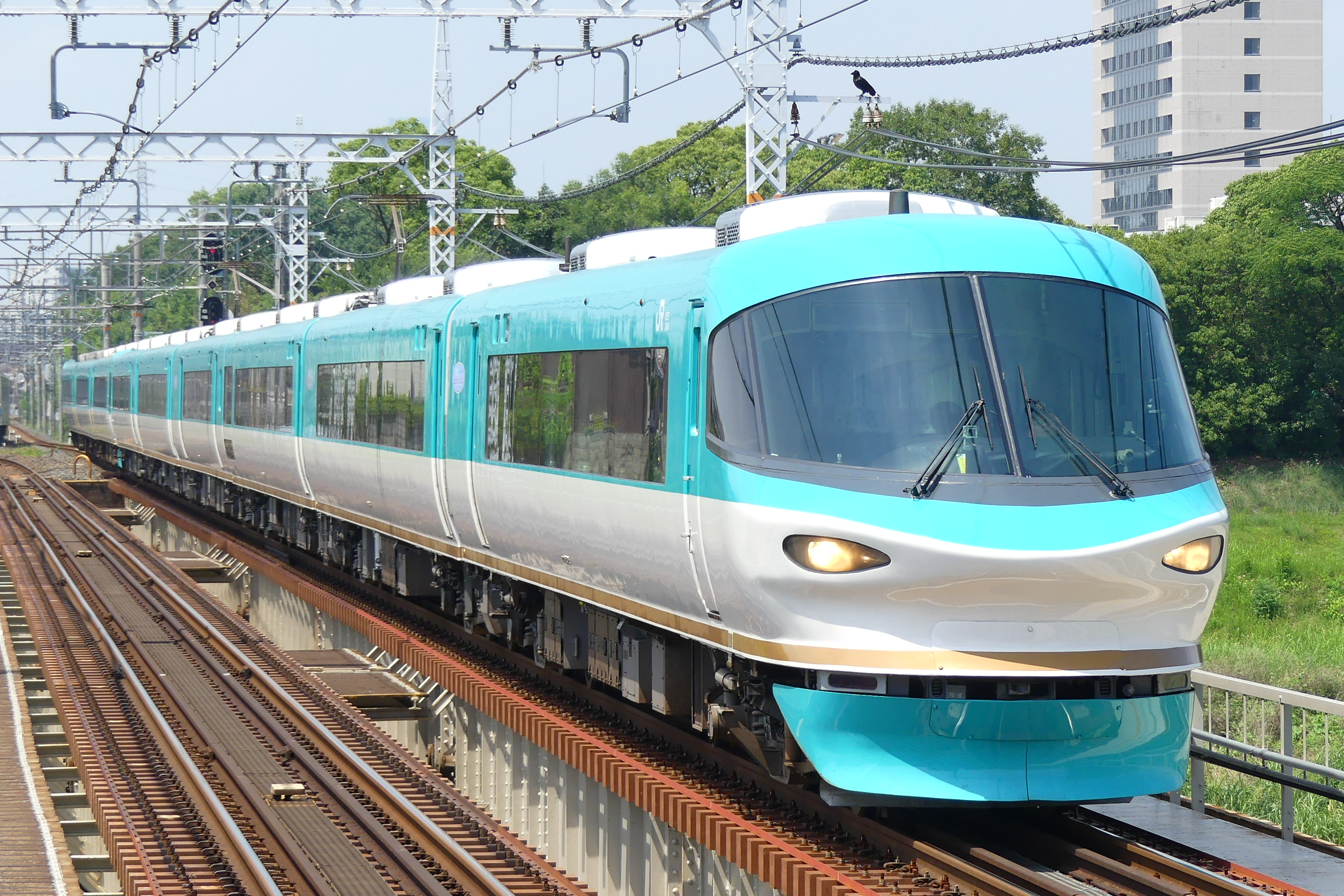
- A 283 series train
- Manufacturers: Hitachi, Kawasaki Heavy Industries, Nippon Sharyo
- Family name: Ocean Arrow
- Constructed: 1996
- Entered service: 31 July 1996
- Number built: 18 vehicles (4 sets)
- Number in service: 18 vehicles
- Formation: 3/6 cars per trainset
- Fleet numbers: HB601–HB602, HB631–HB632
- Operator: JR West
- Depot: Hineno
- Lines served: Tokaido Main Line, Osaka Loop Line, Hanwa Line, Kisei Main Line

Specifications
- Car body construction: Steel
- Car length: 21,300 mm (69 ft 11 in) (panoramic end cars); 20,850 mm (68 ft 5 in) (gangwayed end cars); 20,800 mm (68 ft 3 in) (intermediate cars)
- Width: 2,850 mm (9 ft 4 in)
- Height: 3,390 mm (11 ft 1 in)
- Maximum speed: 130 km/h (81 mph)
- Traction system: Variable frequency (3-level IGBT)
- Electric system: 1,500 V DC overhead
- Current collection: WPS28 single-arm pantograph
- Bogies: WDT57 (powered), WTR241 (trailer)
- Braking systems: Regenerative brake, electronically controlled pneumatic brakes
- Safety systems: ATS-P, ATS-SW
- Track gauge: 1,067 mm (3 ft 6 in)

The 283 series (283系, 283-kei) is a DC electric multiple unit (EMU) train type operated by West Japan Railway Company (JR West) on limited express services on the Kinokuni Line (Kisei Main Line) in Japan.

== Design ==
Built jointly by Hitachi, Kawasaki Heavy Industries, and Nippon Sharyo, two six-car and two three-car sets were built, and introduced on 31 July 1996 to improve travel times on the Kuroshio limited-express service.

== Formations ==
=== 3-car sets ===
Car No.	7	8	9
Designation	Tc'5	M	Tc5
Numbering	KuHa 282-501	MoHa 283-3	KuHa 283-503
Designation	Tc'7	M2	Tsc
Numbering	KuHa 282-701	MoHa 283-201	KuRo 283-1

Car 8 has one single-arm pantograph.

=== 6-car sets ===
The six-car sets are formed as follows.

Car No.	1	2	3	4	5	6
Designation	Tsc'	T	M3	T2	M	Tc5
Numbering	KuRo 282	SaHa 283	MoHa 283-300	SaHa 283-200	MoHa 283	KuHa 283–500
Weight (t)	35.5	33.4	39.6	34.6	39.2	36.2
Seating capacity	30	68	64	46	72	60

Cars 3 and 5 each have one single-arm pantograph.

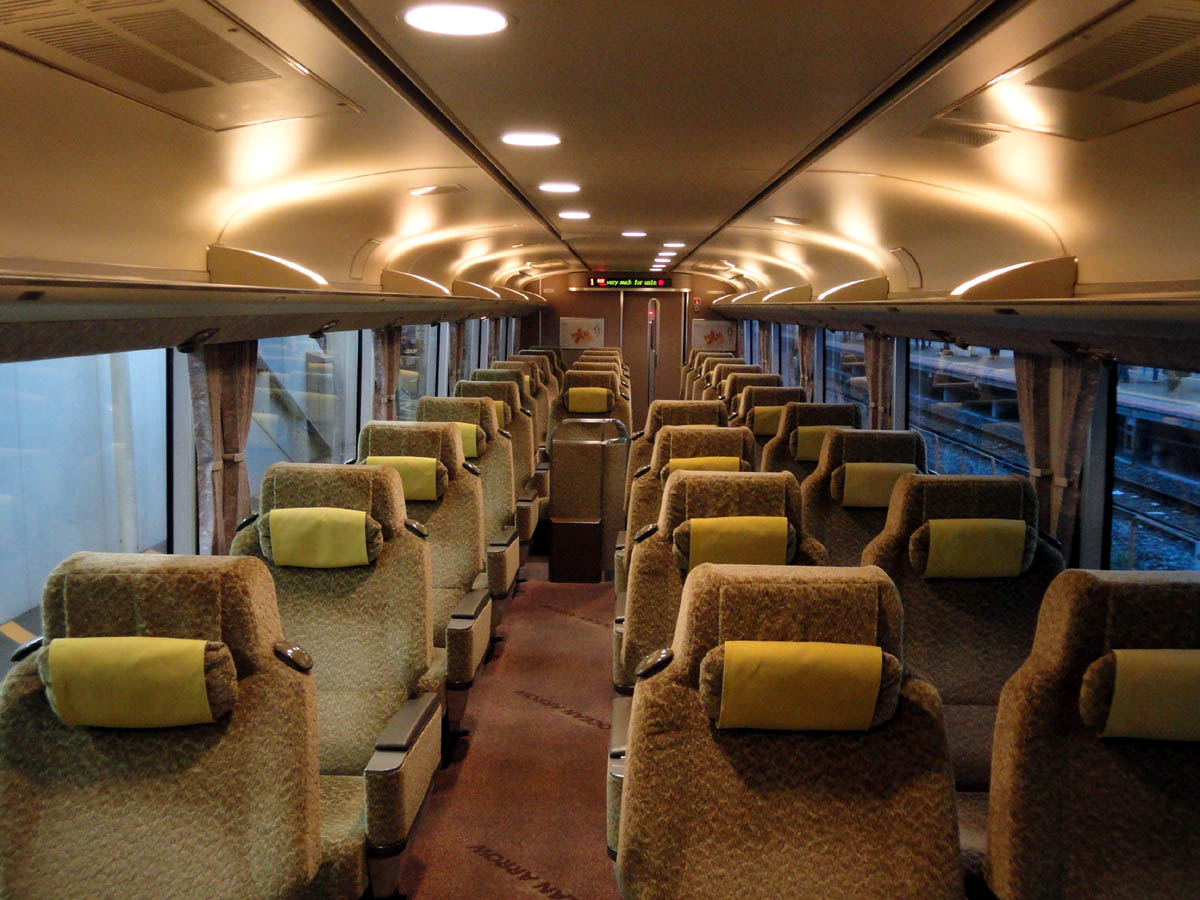
Interior of a Green (first class) car of a 283 series EMU
