= Haruka (train) =

Japanese train service

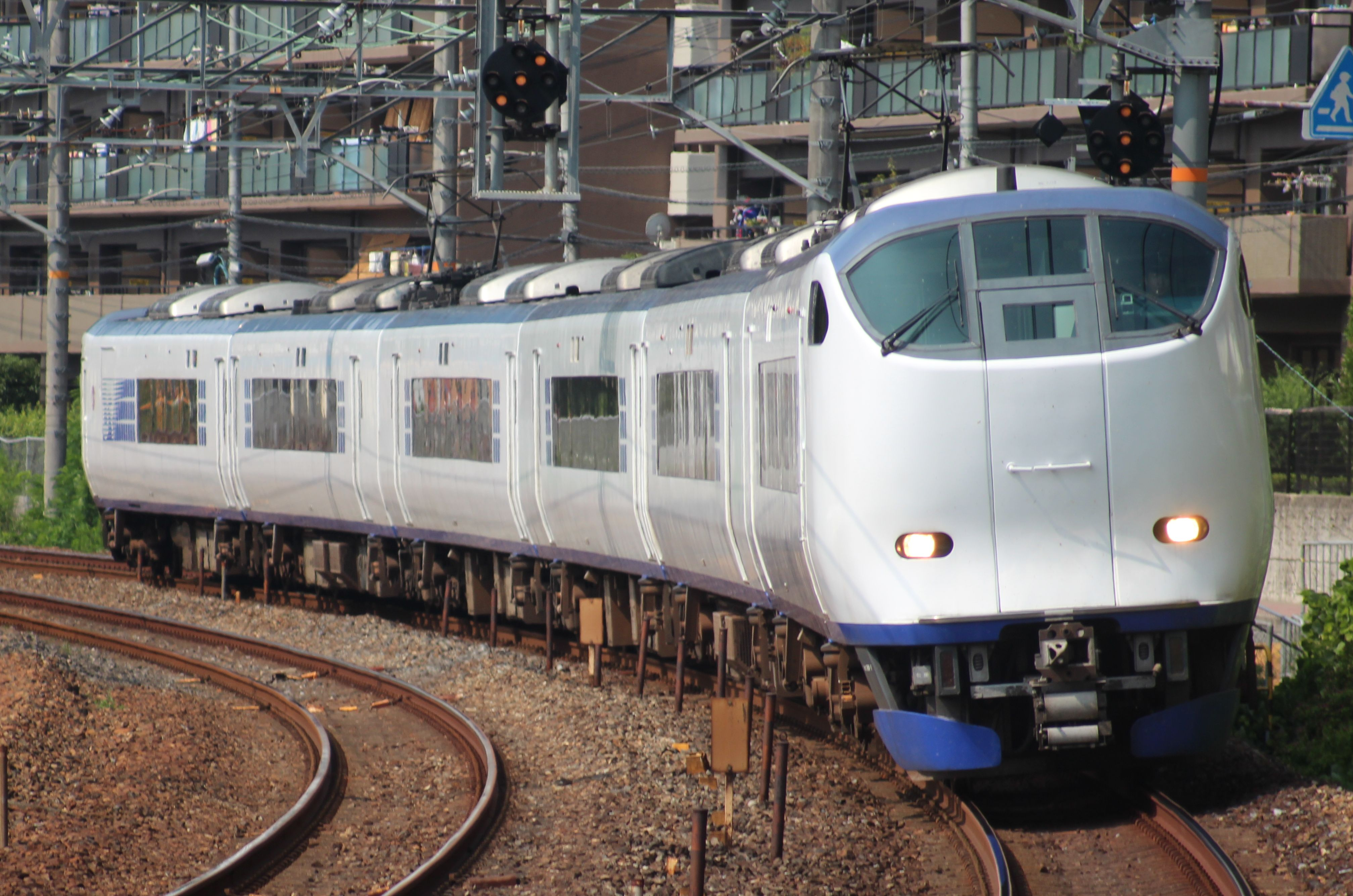
- A JR West 281 series EMU on a Haruka service

Overview
- Service type: Airport rail link (Limited express)
- Locale: Tokaido Main Line, Osaka Loop Line, Hanwa Line, Kansai Airport Line
- First service: 4 September 1994
- Current operator: JR West

Route
- Termini: Kyoto or Yasu; Kansai Airport
- Service frequency: 30 return workings daily

On-board services
- Class: Standard + Green

Technical
- Rolling stock: 271 series, 281 series EMUs
- Track gauge: 1,067 mm (3 ft 6 in)
- Electrification: 1,500 V DC overhead
- Operating speed: 130 km/h (80 mph)

The Haruka (はるか, Haruka) is a limited express passenger train service operated by West Japan Railway Company (JR West) mainly between Kyoto Station to Kansai International Airport in Osaka Prefecture, Japan. Dubbed as the Kansai Airport Limited Express (関空特急) by JR West, it is the fastest train service connecting the airport with downtown Osaka and Kyoto, and also travels to and from Yasu via Kyoto during peak hours. A change of trains was required at either Tennōji or Shin-Ōsaka in order to access Ōsaka Station, before the Umekita underground platforms and tracks for the service at the station were opened in 2023 with a revised timetable.

== Operations ==
There are a total of 30 daily return workings per direction (30 to the airport, 30 from the airport), with services operating every half an hour through most of the day. A typical travel time between Kyoto Station and the airport takes 1 hour 20 minutes per way.

Before the discontinuation of services between Maibara and Yasu, two morning rush hour Haruka trains ran from Maibara to the airport, and one morning rush hour trip from Kusatsu. Two evening rush hour Haruka trains also ran from the airport to Maibara.

== Station stops ==
The Haruka primarily operates between Kyoto Station and Kansai Airport Station, with most services stopping only at Shin-Ōsaka Station, Ōsaka Station, and Tennōji Station in Osaka City. Some trains make additional stops during the early morning or evening rush hours (stations in italics in list below).

The train service once traveled on the Umeda Freight Line which was used to bypass Ōsaka Station when it runs from the Tōkaidō Main Line to Osaka Loop Line and vice versa, until the underground tracks and platforms for trains either stopping at and passing the former were opened on 18 March 2023.

Line	Station	Transfers
Tōkaidō (Biwako)	Yasu	
Tōkaidō (Biwako)	Moriyama	
Tōkaidō (Biwako)	Kusatsu	Kusatsu Line
Tōkaidō (Biwako)	Ishiyama	Keihan Ishiyama Sakamoto Line
Tōkaidō (Biwako)	Ōtsu	
Tōkaidō (Biwako)	Yamashina	Kosei Line, Keihan Keishin Line, Subway Tōzai Line
Tōkaidō (Biwako)	Kyoto	Tōkaidō Shinkansen, Sanin Main Line, Nara Line; Kintetsu Kyoto Line, Subway Karasuma Line
Tōkaidō (JR Kyoto)	Kyoto	Tōkaidō Shinkansen, Sanin Main Line, Nara Line; Kintetsu Kyoto Line, Subway Karasuma Line
Tōkaidō (JR Kyoto)	Takatsuki	
Tōkaidō (JR Kyoto)	Shin-Ōsaka	Tōkaidō Shinkansen, Sanyō Shinkansen, Subway Midōsuji Line, Osaka Higashi Line
Tōkaidō (freight branch); Osaka Loop	Shin-Ōsaka	Tōkaidō Shinkansen, Sanyō Shinkansen, Subway Midōsuji Line, Osaka Higashi Line
Tōkaidō (freight branch); Osaka Loop	Ōsaka	Fukuchiyama Line, Hankyu Line, Hanshin Line, Kintetsu Osaka Line, Subway Midosuji Line, Osaka Loop Line, Osaka Higashi Line
Tōkaidō (freight branch); Osaka Loop	Tennōji	Yamatoji Line, Subway Midōsuji and Tanimachi Lines, Kintetsu Minami Osaka Line
Hanwa	Tennōji	Yamatoji Line, Subway Midōsuji and Tanimachi Lines, Kintetsu Minami Osaka Line
Hanwa	Izumi-Fuchū	
Hanwa	Hineno	Hanwa Line for Wakayama
Kansai Airport	Hineno	Hanwa Line for Wakayama
Kansai Airport	Kansai Airport	

== Rolling stock ==
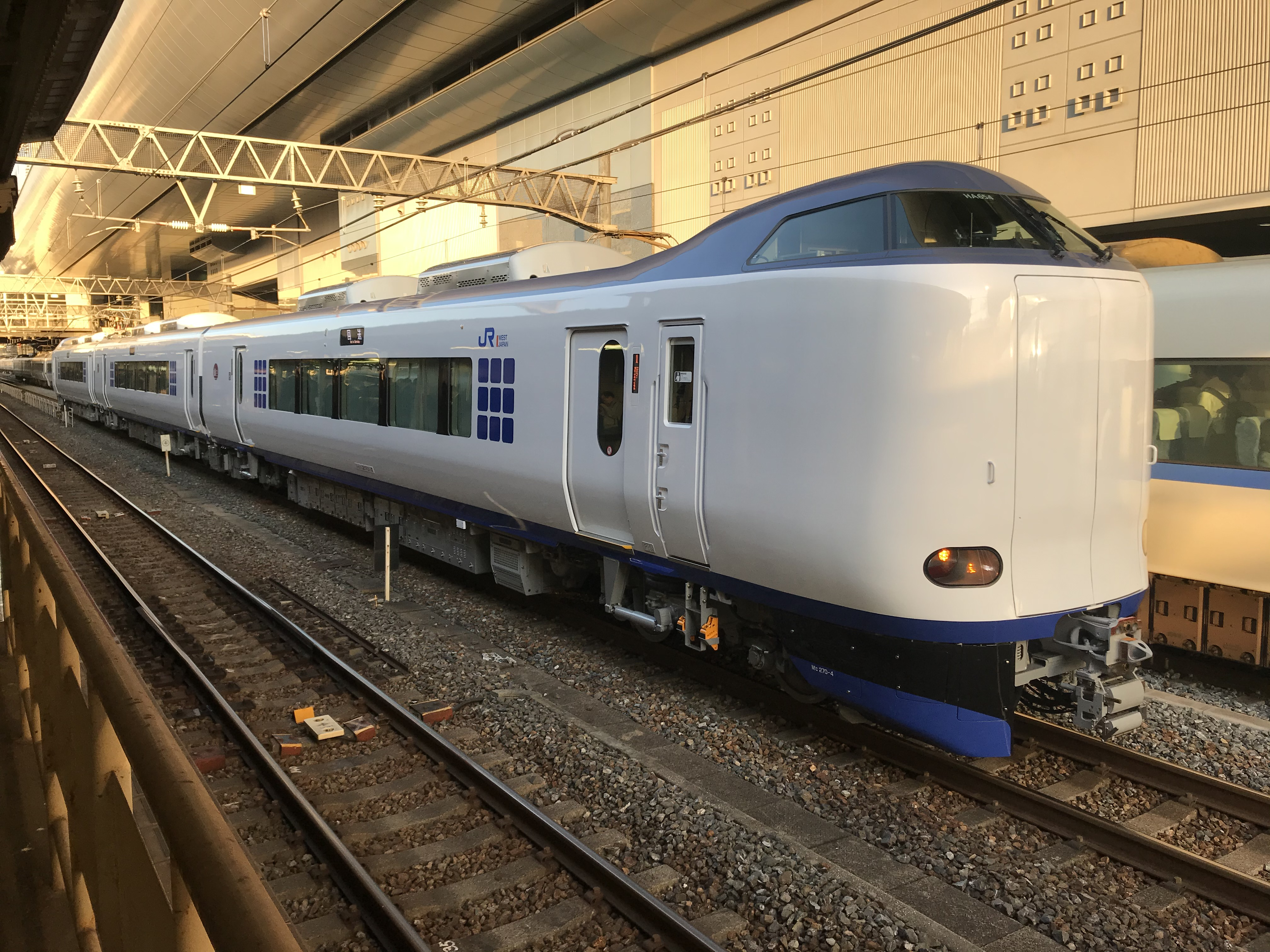
271 series EMU

- 281 series (since September 1994)
- 271 series (since March 2020)

=== Formations ===
==== 6-car formations ====
6-car formations are arranged as shown below, with car 1 at the Maibara/Kyoto end.

Car No.	1	2	3	4	5	6
Numbering	KuRo 280	MoHa 281	SaHa 281	SaHa 281-100	MoHa 281	KuHa 281
Accommodation	Green	Reserved	Reserved	Reserved	Non-reserved	Non-reserved
Facilities	Toilet	Wheelchair space / Toilet		toilet		

All cars are non-smoking.

==== 9-car formations (281 series) ====
9-car formations are arranged as shown below, with car 1 at the Kyoto end.

Car No.	1	2	3	4	5	6	7	8	9
Numbering	KuRo 280	MoHa 281	SaHa 281	SaHa 281-100	MoHa 281	KuHa 281	KuHa 280	SaHa 281-100	KuMoHa 281
Accommodation	Green	Reserved	Reserved	reserved	Non-reserved	Non-reserved	Non-Reserved	Reserved	Reserved
Facilities	Toilet	Wheelchair space / Toilet		toilet			toilet, chargeing-outlet	toilet, charging-outlet	charging-outlet

All cars are non-smoking.

==== 9-car formations (281 series & 271 series) ====
9-car formations are arranged as shown below, with car 1 at the Kyoto end.

Car No.	1	2	3	4	5	6	7	8	9
Numbering	KuRo 280	MoHa 281	SaHa 281	SaHa 281-100	MoHa 281	KuHa 281	KuMoHa 270	MoHa 271	KuMoHa 271
Accommodation	Green	Reserved	Reserved	reserved	Non-reserved	Non-reserved	Non-Reserved	Reserved	Reserved
Facilities	Toilet		Wheelchair space / Toilet	Toilet			charging outlet, Toilet	charging outlet, Toilet	charging outlet

All cars are non-smoking.

== Ticketing ==
As a limited express service, the Haruka requires both a fare ticket (乗車券, jōshaken) and a limited express ticket (特急券, tokkyūken) – see train tickets in Japan. The ICOCA card can be used as a fare ticket (for passing the ticket gate) for non-reserved travel, with the limited express ticket purchased from the conductor on board the train. There are no extra charges required for the Haruka service for foreign passengers traveling with a Japan Rail Pass.

A free public Wi-Fi service is provided in the train.

== History ==
The Haruka service was inaugurated on 4 September 1994 using 3-car 281 series EMUs.

6-car 281 series sets were introduced from 2 April 1995, and 9-car (6+3-car) formations were introduced from 14 July 1995.

Non-reserved cars were introduced from 1 December 1998.

The smoking areas were abolished from the start of 18 March 2007 timetable revision.

Haruka services were suspended on 4 September 2018 due to the effects of Typhoon Jebi causing damage to the airport and the Sky Gate Bridge R being damaged by an empty fuel tanker. Services were restored on 8 September 2018, but could only go as far as Hineno Station due to the section leading to the airport being cordoned off for repair works. Through services to the airport were completely restored on 18 September 2018.

From the start of the revised timetable on 14 March 2020, new 271 series trains were introduced on these services, operating coupled with the existing 281 series sets. From the same date, all Haruka services were formed as nine cars, increasing passenger capacity between Kansai International Airport and Kyoto.

All trains currently run in a special "Hello Kitty"-themed wrapping since 29 January 2019.

Haruka services were reduced since September 2020 due to low passenger demand caused by the COVID-19 pandemic in Japan, only operating during morning and evening commuter hours. Daytime Haruka services were partially restored from 1 July 2022, with the remaining services reinstated on 1 November 2022 to coincide with the reopening of Japan's borders.

From the start of the revised timetable on 18 March 2023, all Haruka services began to make a stop at Ōsaka Station using the new Umekita underground platforms set aside for these services, further enhancing connectivity between the airport and the city center. In preparation for the opening of the Umekita underground platforms, train services were rerouted from the Umeda Freight Line from 13 February 2023. The new platforms opened for service a month later on 18 March 2023.

=== Future plans ===
On 22 November 2024, JR West and Kyoto City announced that Haruka services currently terminating at Kyoto Station would be extended to Yamashina Station from fiscal 2029 to relieve congestion at Kyoto Station, particularly the Sagano Line platform shared with the Haruka trains. The renovation project of Yamashina Station is scheduled to commence in 2025 and aimed at developing the Yamashina area as the eastern gateway to the city by enabling transfer to the Kyoto Municipal Subway Tōzai Line and other modes of public transport, thereby improving accessibility and promoting sustainable tourism.

The special "Hello Kitty" themed trainsets are expected to cease operations in the middle of 2027.

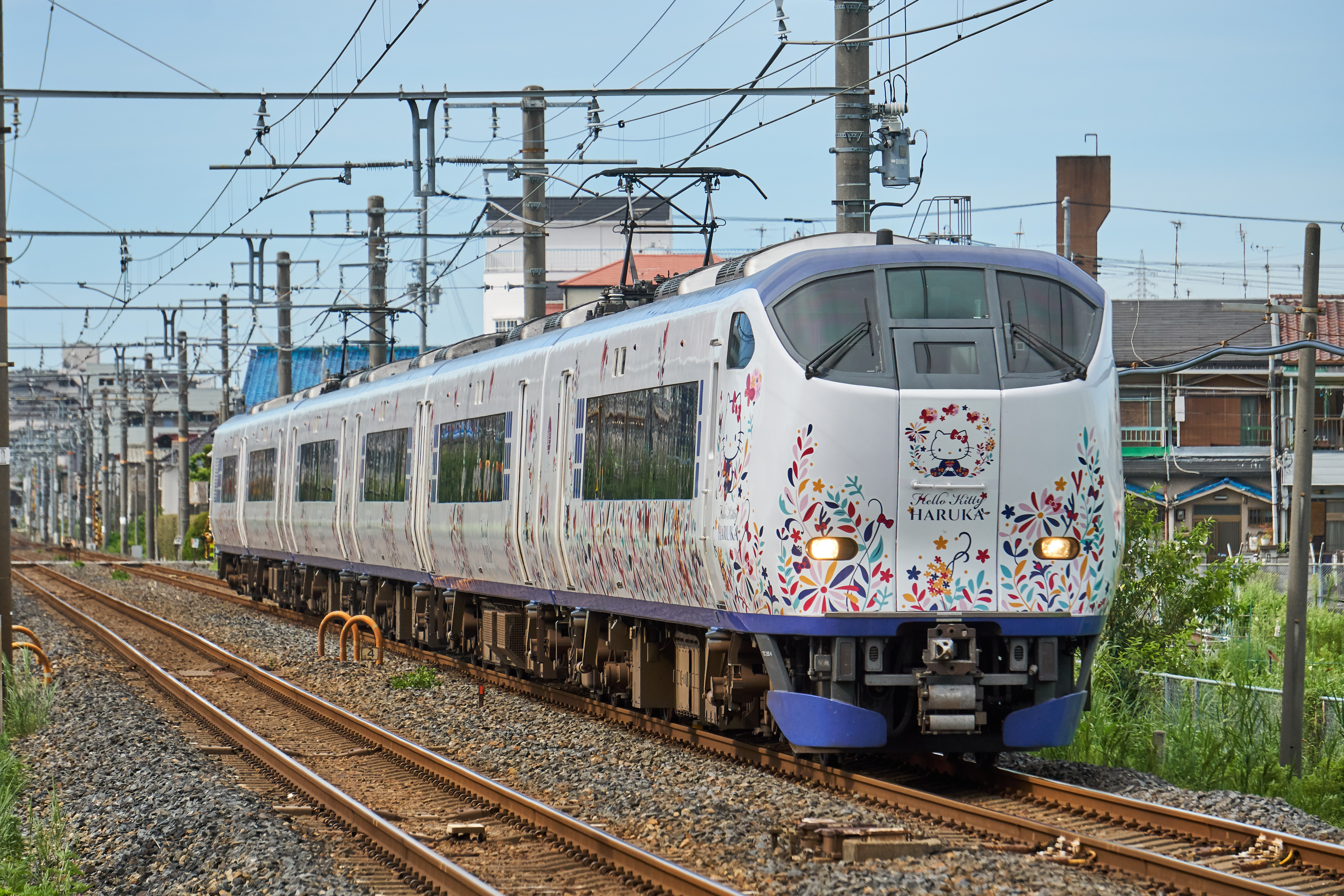
281 series Hello-Kitty train Butterfly set in September 2019

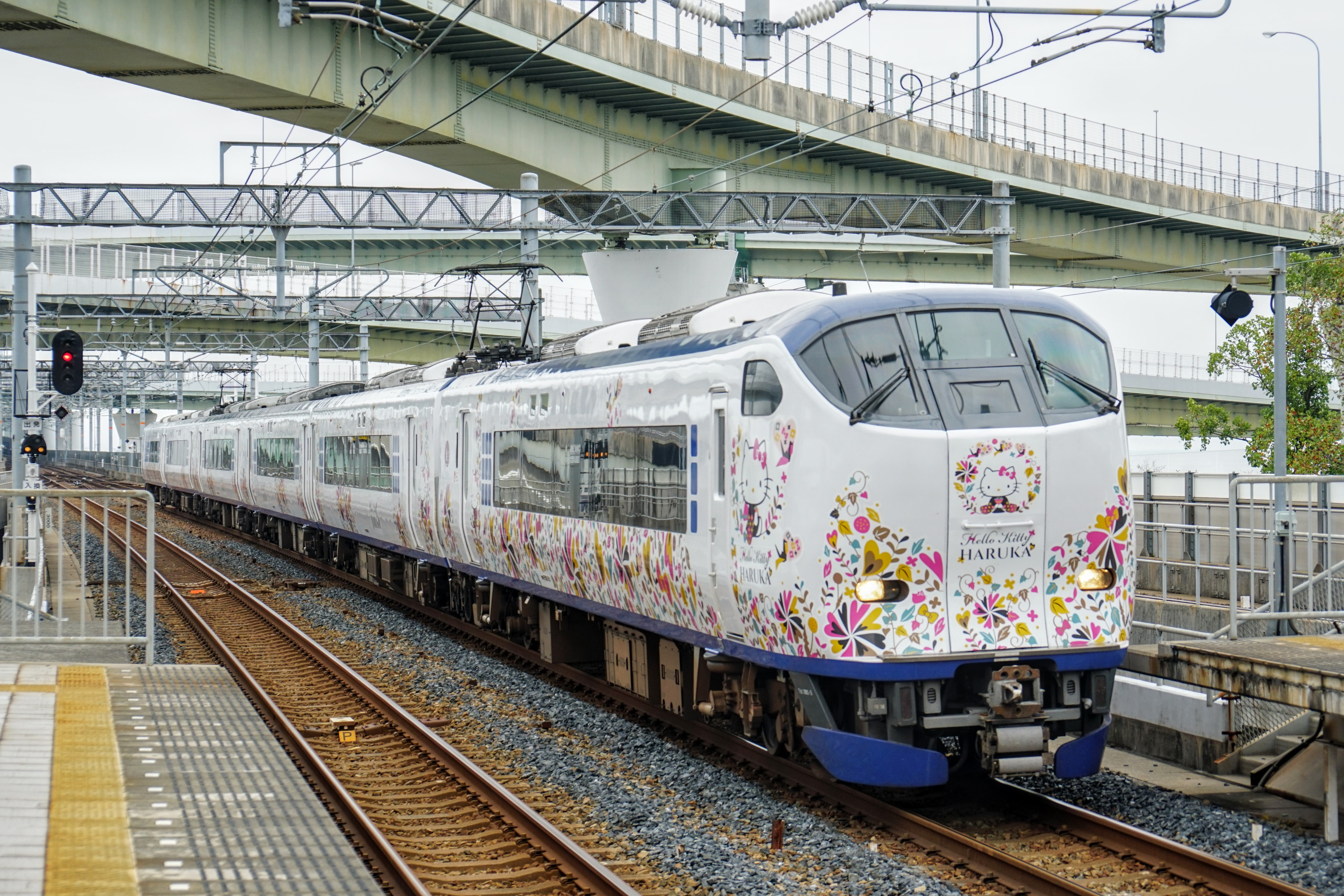
281 series Hello-Kitty train Ori-Tsuru set in August 2019

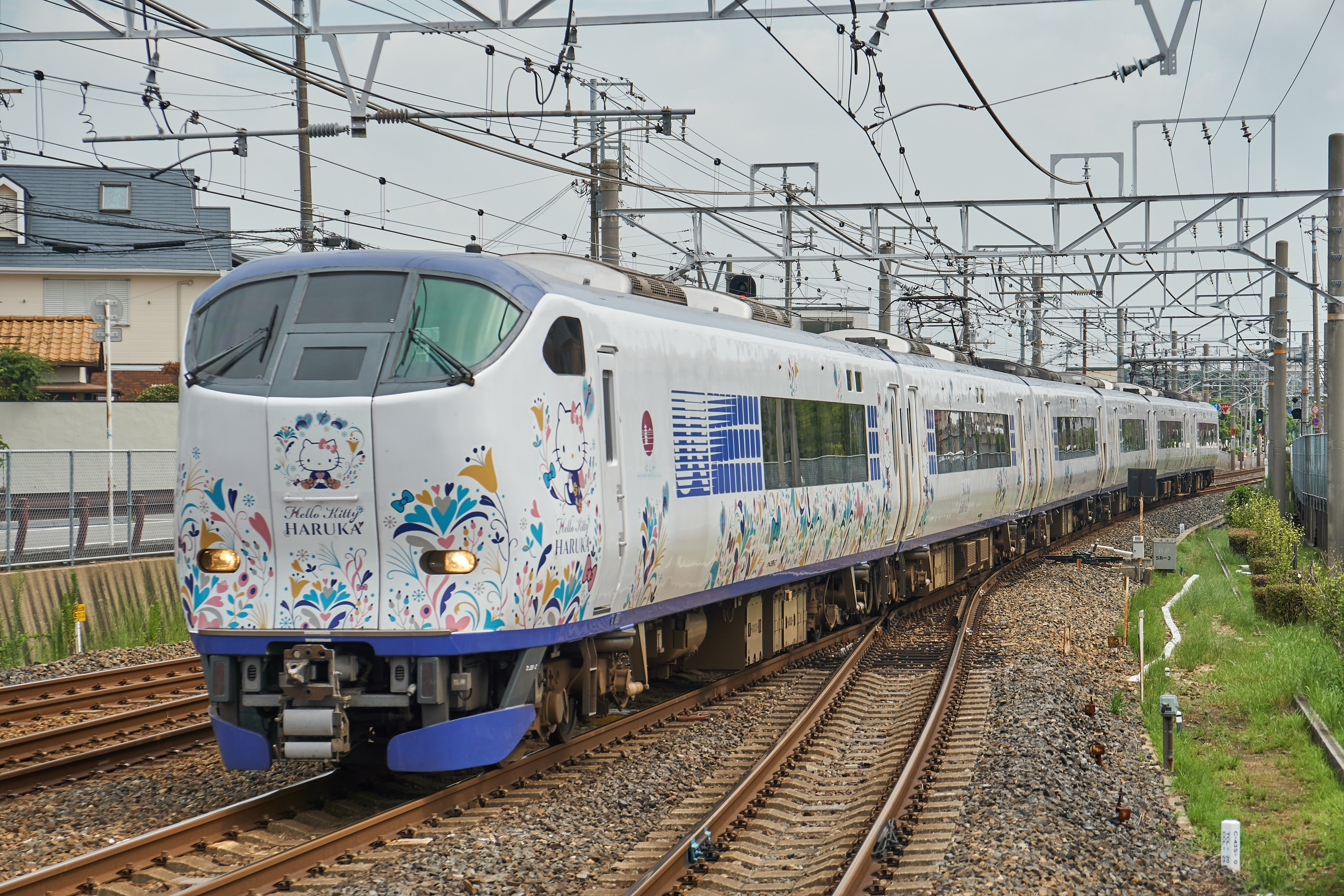
281 series Hello-Kitty train Kanzashi set in August 2019

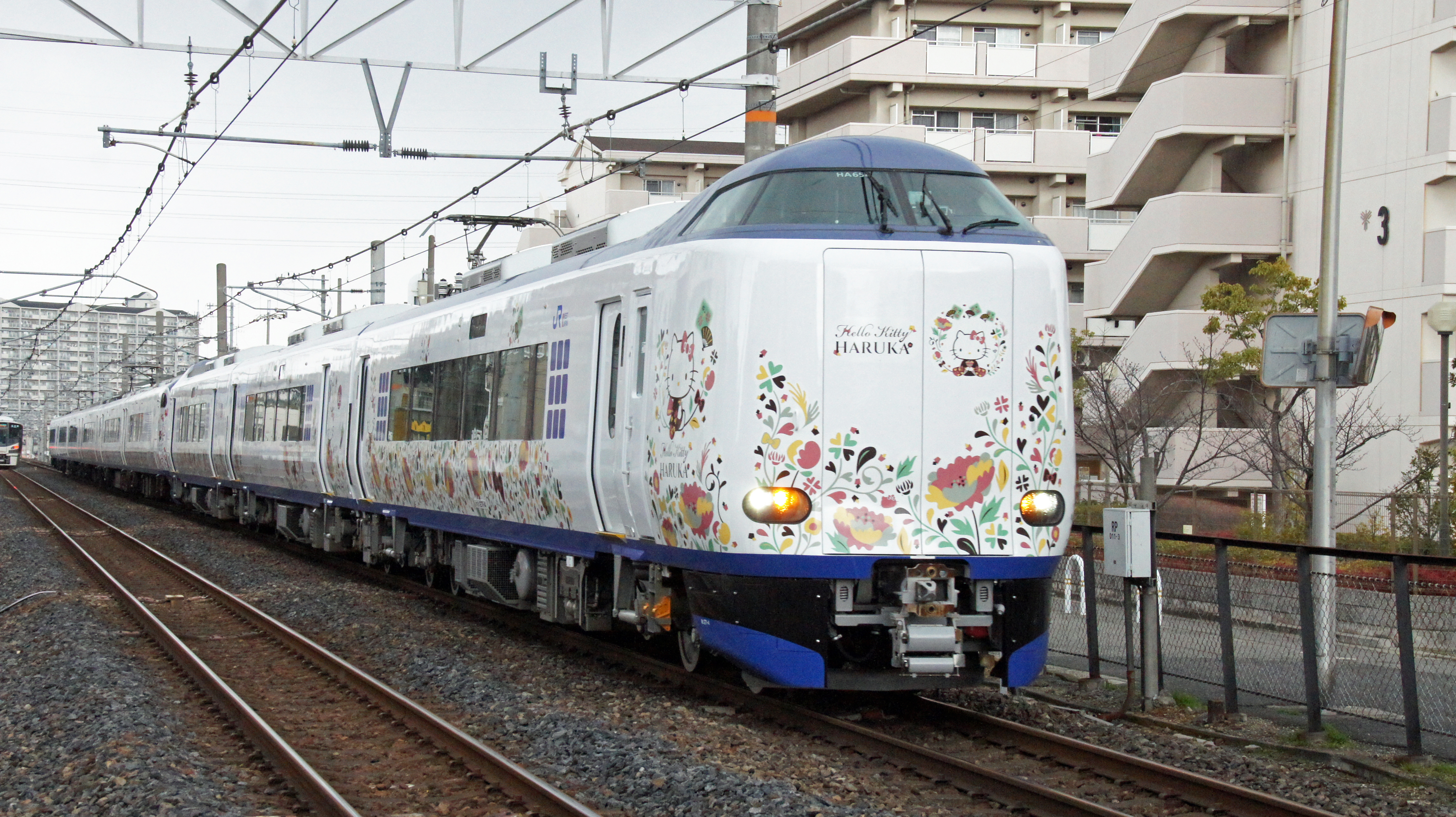
271 series Hello-Kitty train in March 2020

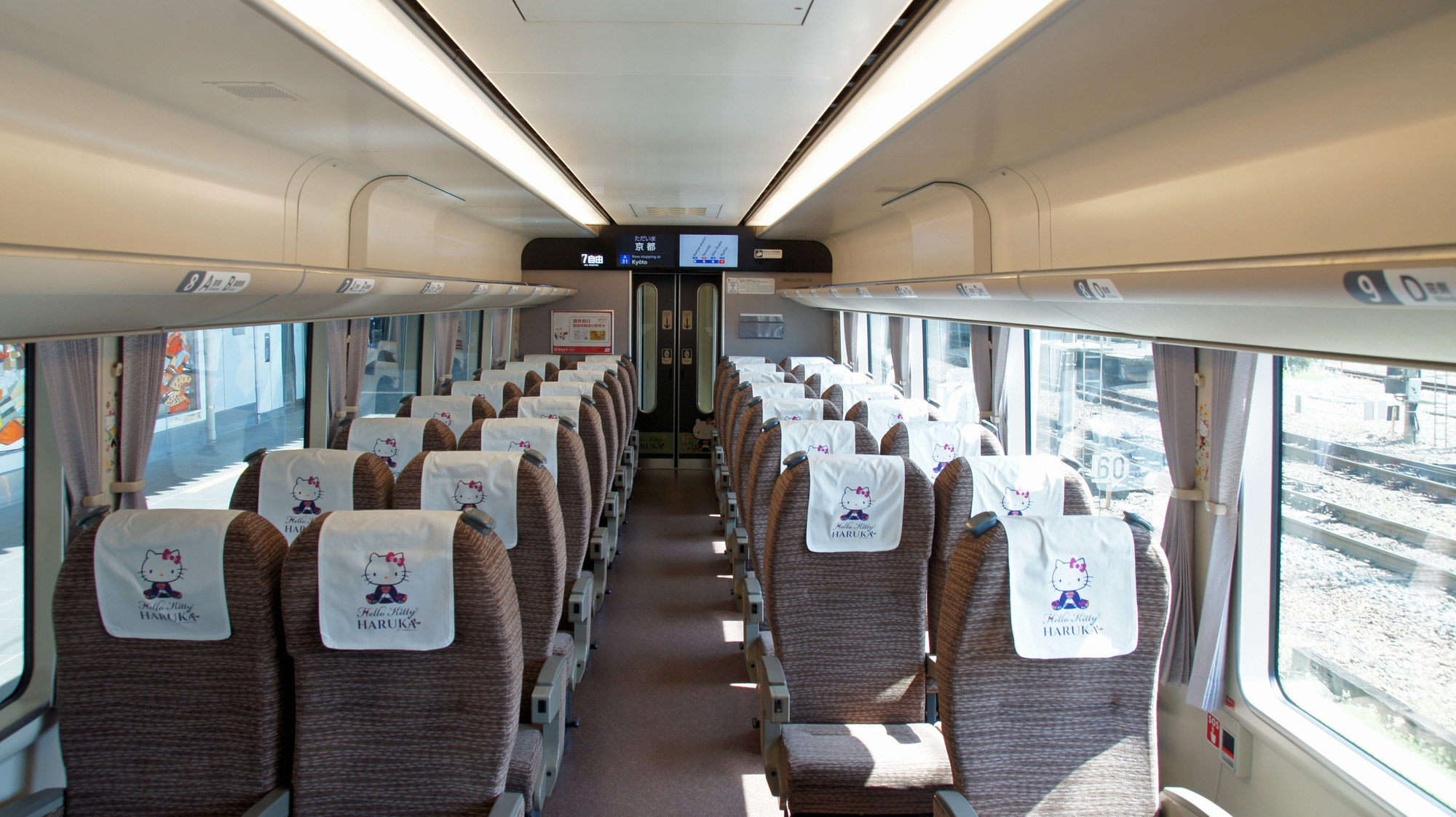
271 series Hello-Kitty train interior

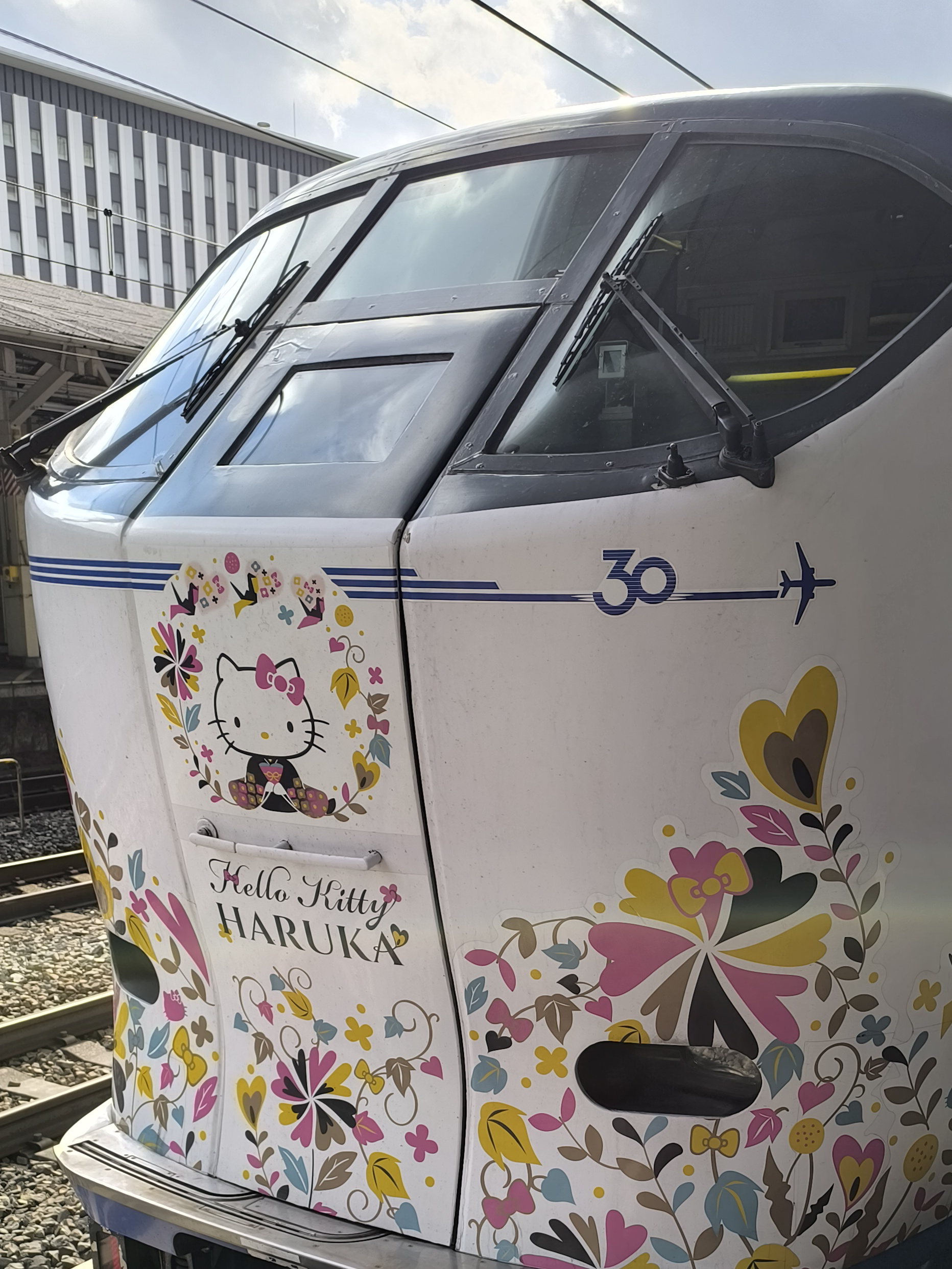
281 series with wrapping marking Haruka's 30th anniversary
