= 271 series =

Japanese electric multiple unit train type

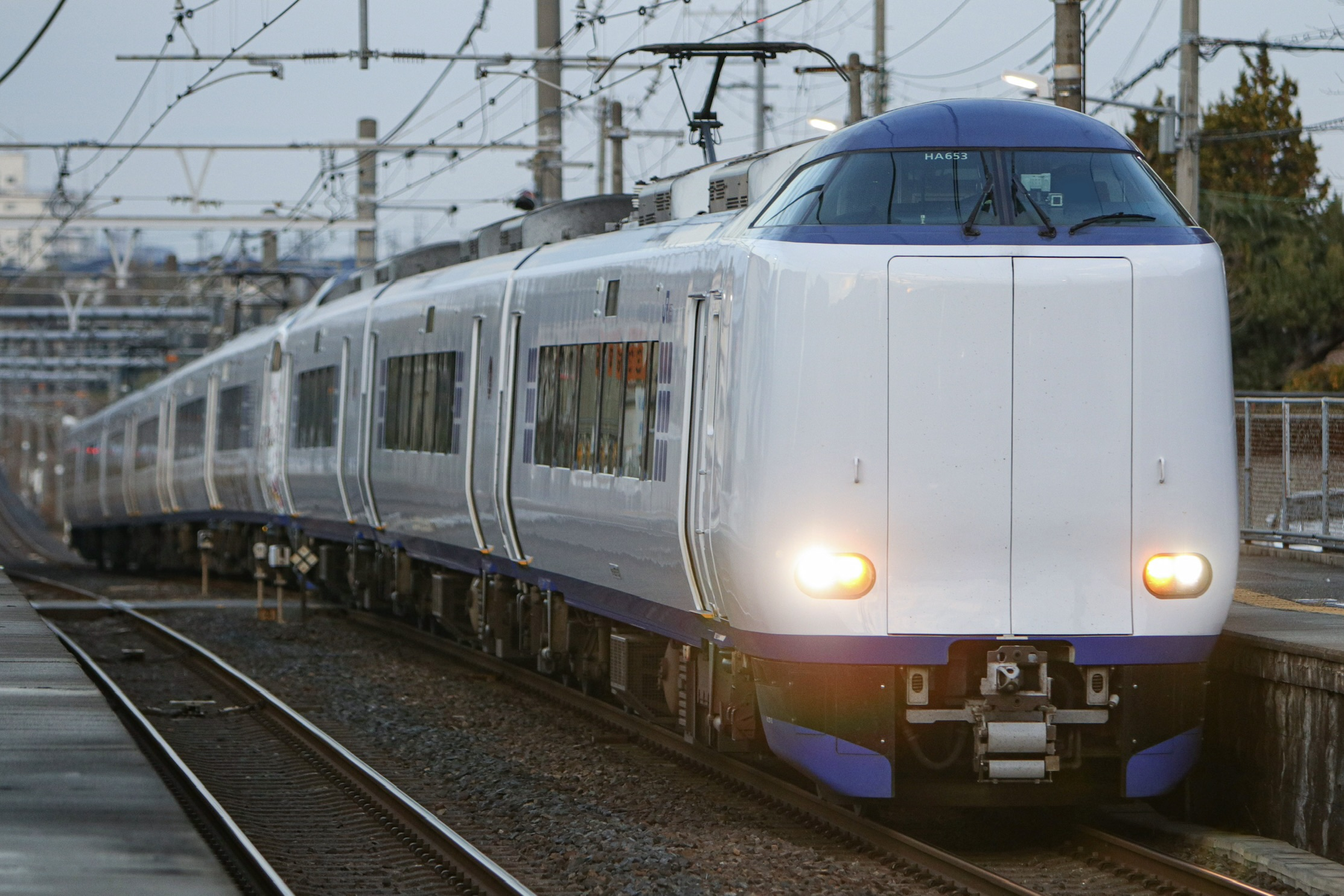
- 271 series on a Haruka service
- In service: March 2020 - Present
- Manufacturer: Kinki Sharyo
- Family name: Haruka
- Constructed: 2019–2020
- Entered service: 14 March 2020
- Number built: 18 cars (6 sets)
- Number in service: 18 cars (6 sets)
- Formation: 3 cars per trainset
- Fleet numbers: HA651 – HA656
- Operator: JR West

Specifications
- Height: 3,585 mm (11 ft 9.1 in)
- Maximum speed: 130 km/h (81 mph)
- Traction system: Variable frequency (SiC-MOSFET)
- Electric systems: 1,500 V DC overhead lines
- Current collection: WPS28E single-arm pantograph
- Safety systems: ATS-SW・P and Dead man's switch
- Multiple working: 281 series
- Track gauge: 1,067 mm (3 ft 6 in)

The 271 series (271系, 271-kei) is an electric multiple unit (EMU) train type operated by West Japan Railway Company (JR West) on Haruka limited express services to and from Kansai International Airport.

== Design ==
The trains inherit some of design elements of the 281 series currently used on Haruka services, such as its livery, the Haruka branding and the "square dot" logos.

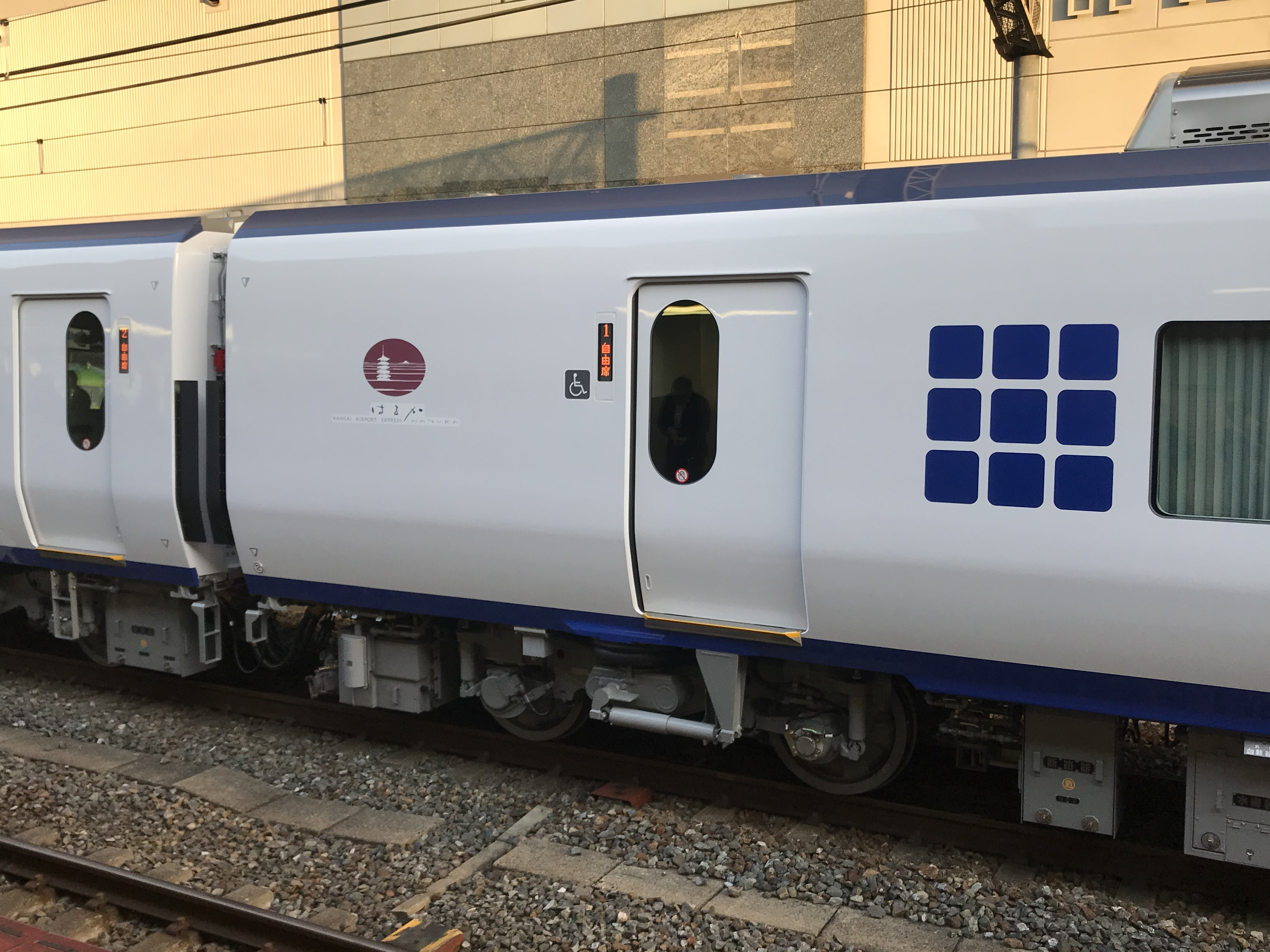
Haruka branding on a 271 series train

== Formations ==
The trains are formed as three-car sets, and operate coupled with the existing 281 series sets to form as nine-car train services. The 271 series trains are formed as follows.

Car	End car	Intermediate car	End car
Designation	KuMoHa 271	MoHa 270	KuMoHa 270

The KuMoHa 271 car is fitted with one WPS28E single-arm pantograph.

== Interior ==
The interior features a 2+2 seating arrangement with rotating and reclining seats, AC power outlets on all seats, as well as dedicated luggage spaces. Multilingual passenger informations are provided on displays above the doors.

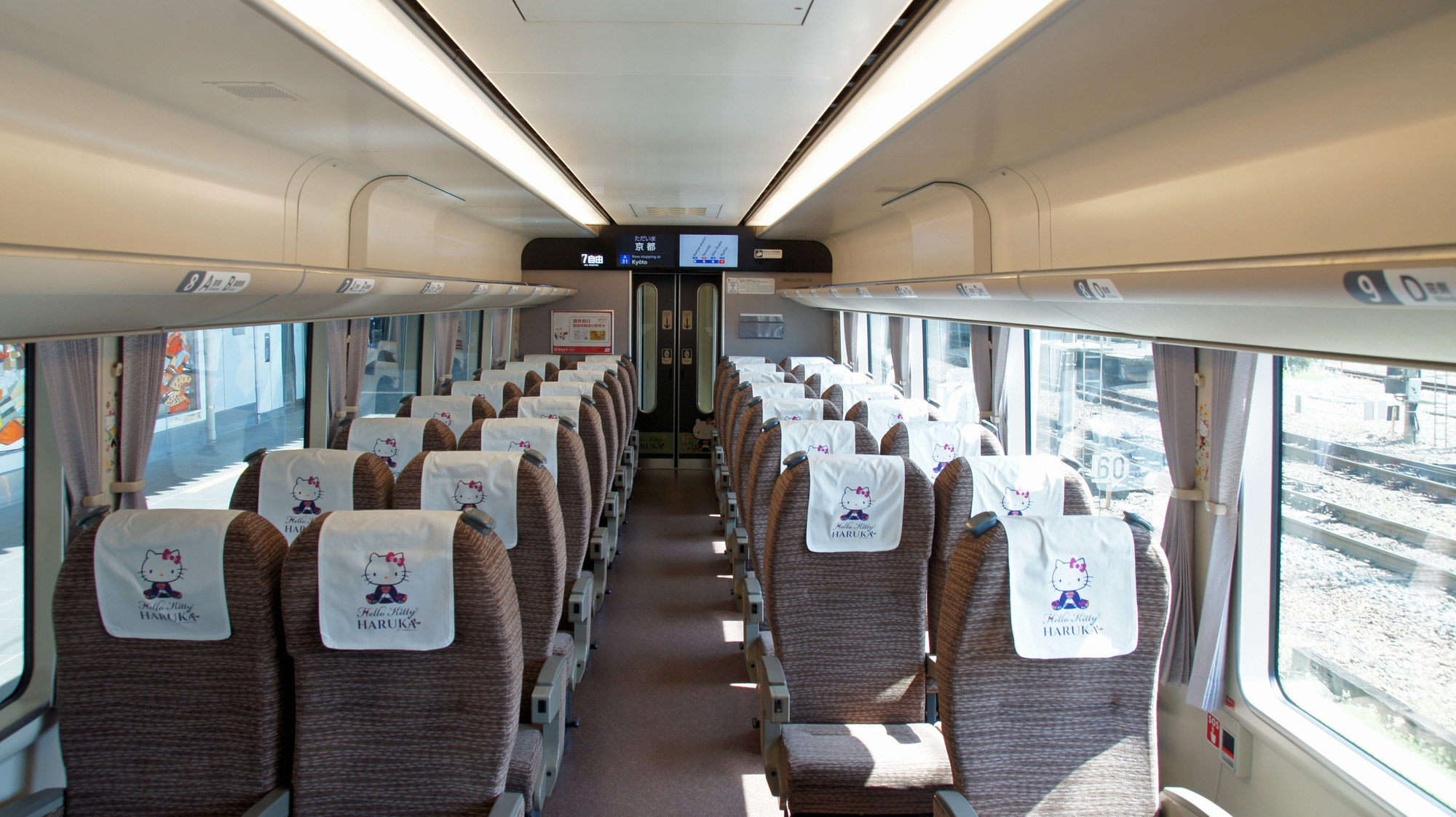
Interior

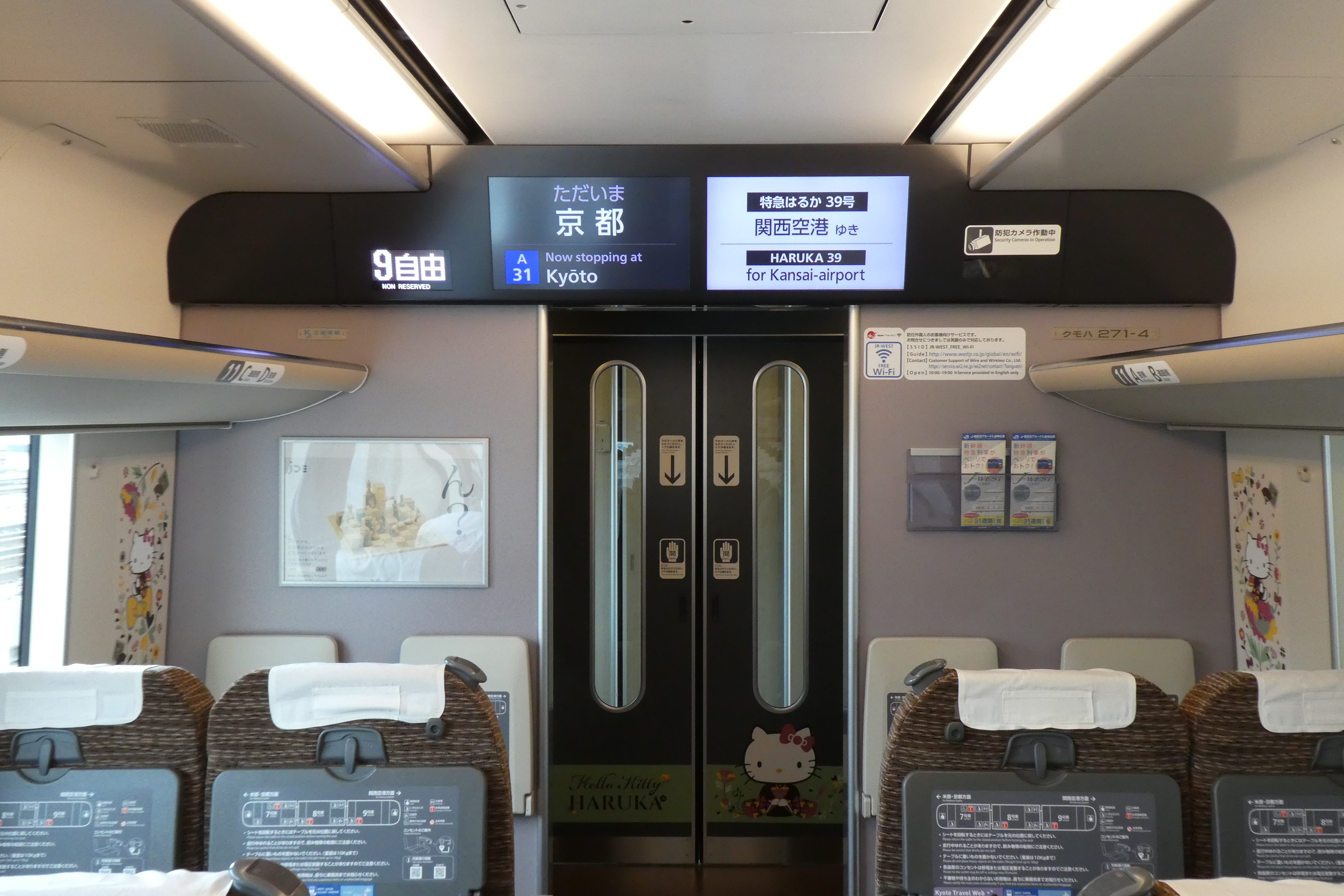
Passenger information displays

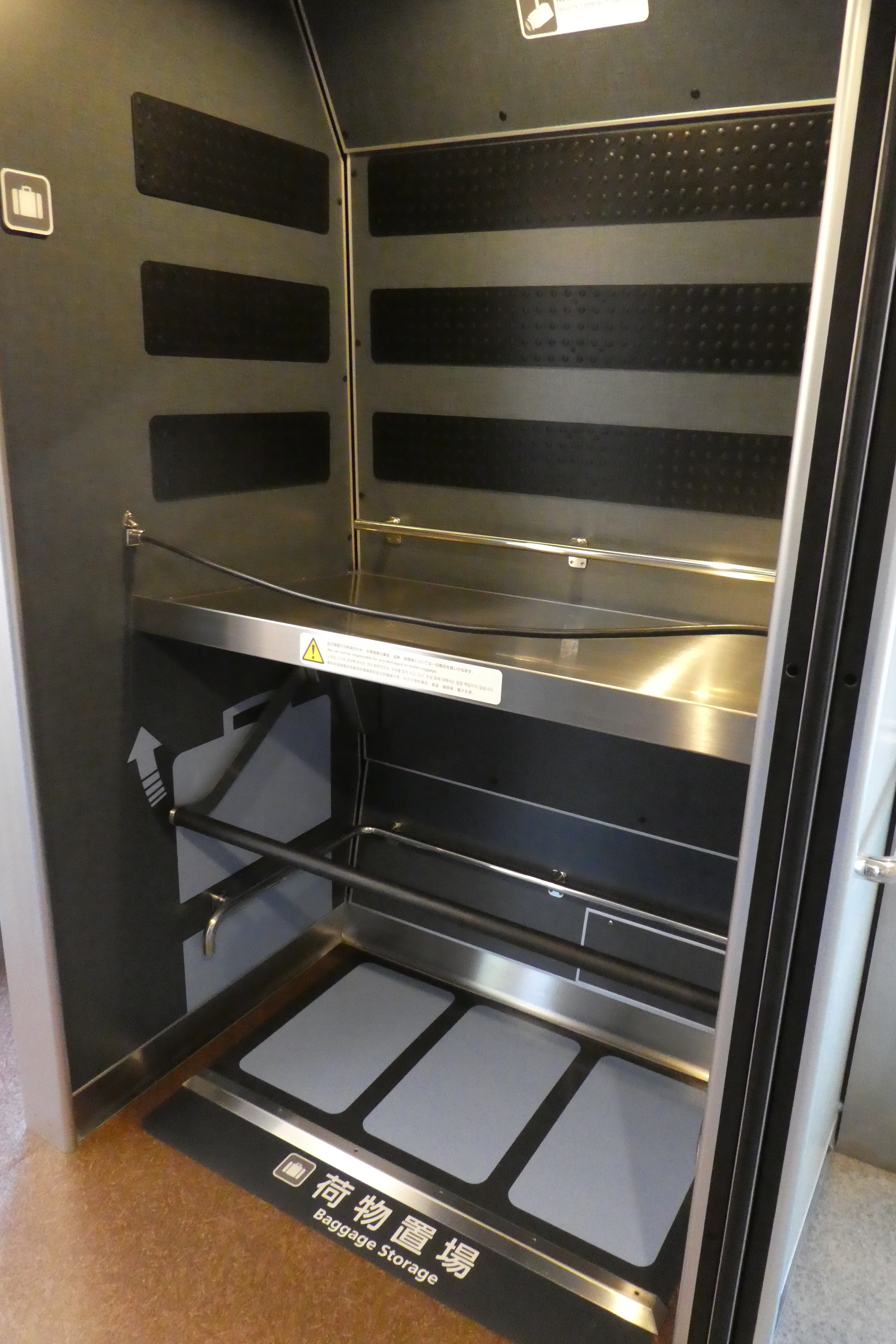
Luggage racks

== History ==
On 21 June 2019 JR West announced the introduction of new 271 series trains on Haruka limited express services. The order for 18 cars was worth 6 billion yen. The first train was unveiled at the Kinki Sharyo head office on 10 July 2019. The trains entered revenue service on 14 March 2020, but due to the outbreak of the COVID-19 pandemic and the subsequent drop of air travelers, JR West decided to postpone lengthening the Haruka trains to nine cars.

Currently, all Haruka trains are still formed in six car sets, with nine-car services intended to resume when air travel goes back to normal. The sets re-entered service on 13 March 2021 with the introduction of that year's revised timetable when various Haruka sets resumed 9-car operation.
