= Miyakojima-ku =

Ward of Osaka, Japan

Coordinates: 34°42′4.6″N 135°31′41.12″E

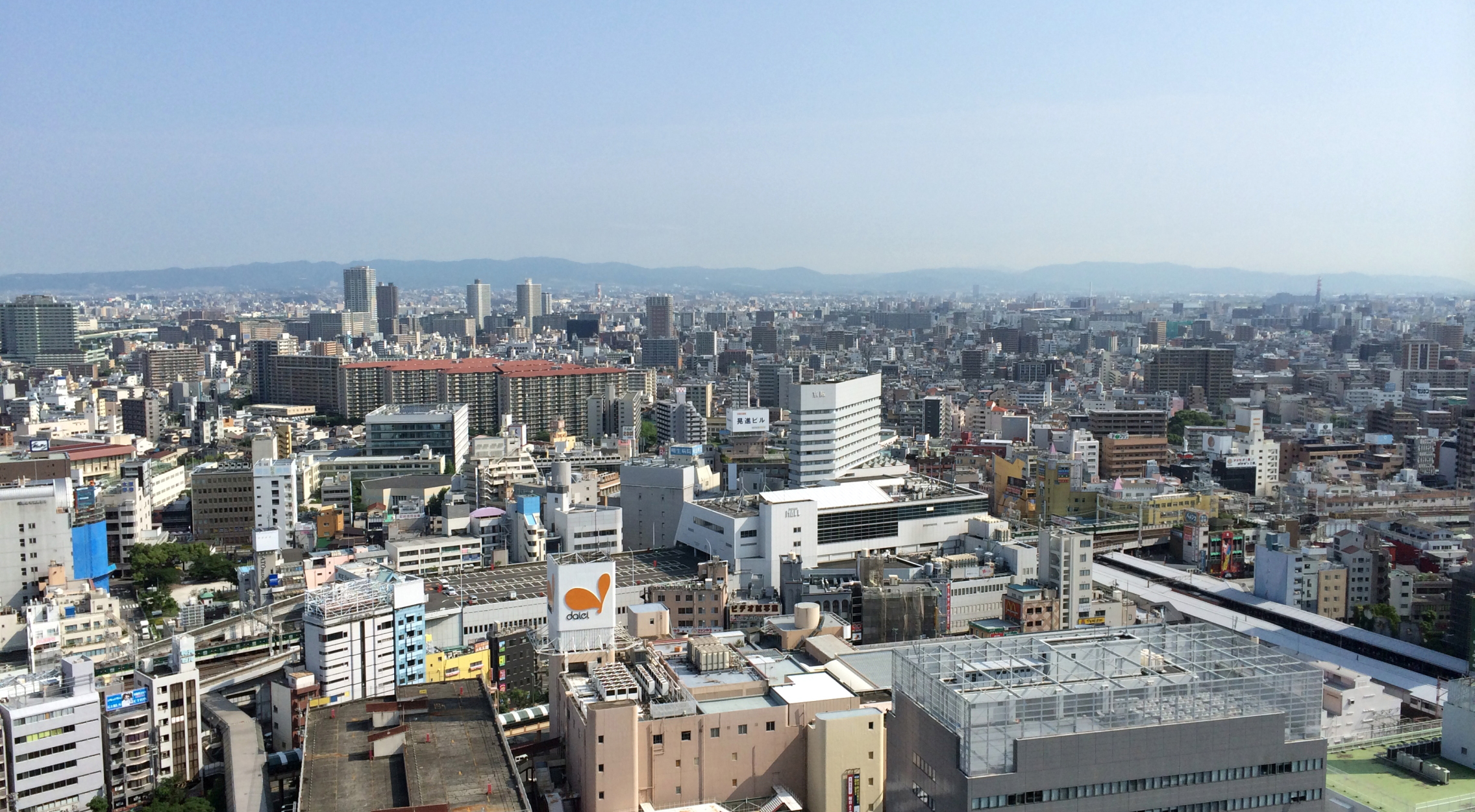
Miyakojima Ward Skyline

Miyakojima (都島区, Miyakojima-ku) is one of 24 wards of Osaka, Japan.
