= Ajikawaguchi Station =

Railway station in Osaka, Japan

Ajikawaguchi Station 安治川口駅
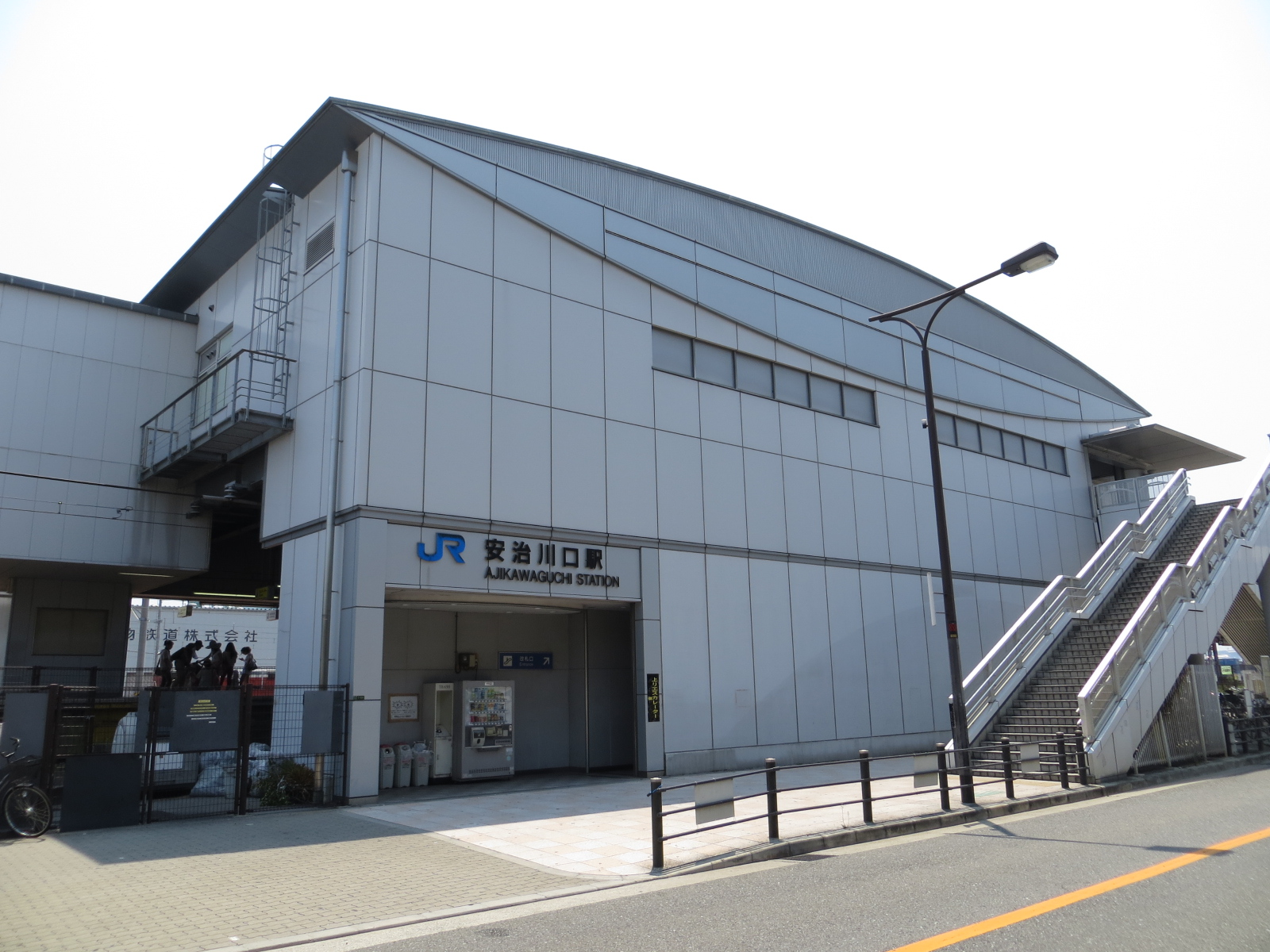
- Ajigawaguchi Station (August 2013)

General information
- Location: 6-1-101 Shimaya, Konohana Ward, Osaka City; Osaka Prefecture; Japan
- Coordinates: 34°40′25.56″N 135°26′38.76″E
- Operator: JR West
- Platforms: 1 island platform
- Tracks: 2

Construction
- Structure type: Ground level
- Accessible: Yes

Other information
- Station code: JR-P15

History
- Opened: 5 April 1898; 128 years ago

Passengers
- 2020: 11,682 daily

Services
Preceding station	JR West	Following station
Universal City towards Sakurajima	JR Yumesaki Line	Nishikujō Terminus
Location
- Location within Osaka Prefecture Location within Kansai region Location within Japan

Ajikawaguchi Station (安治川口駅, Ajikawaguchi-eki) is a train station on the West Japan Railway Company (JR West) Sakurajima Line (JR Yumesaki Line) in Konohana-ku, Osaka, Osaka Prefecture, Japan.

Station numbering was introduced in March 2018 with Ajikawaguchi being assigned station number JR-P15.

== Layout ==
The station has an island platform serving two tracks.

1	■ JR Yumesaki Line	for Nishikujō and Ōsaka
2	■ JR Yumesaki Line	for Sakurajima

== Railway collision ==
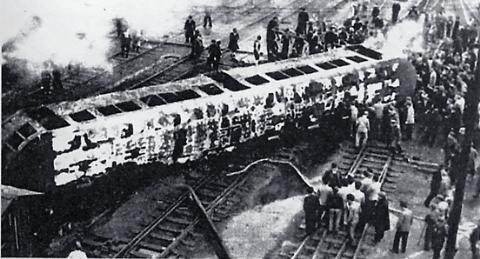
The aftermath of the 1940 fire

On 29 January 1940, three trains collided, carrying gasoline and factory workers, causing a fire that killed 181 people, and injured 92 on the Nishinari Line, presently the Sakurajima Line.
