= Sakurajima (disambiguation) =

Sakurajima may refer to:

== Places ==
- 10516 Sakurajima, the asteroid "Sakurajima", a Main Belt asteroid, the 10516th minor planet registered

=== Japan ===
Kagoshima

- Sakurajima, a volcano, mountain, former island, peninsula, in Kagoshima, Kyushu, Japan
- Sakurajima, Kagoshima, Kyushu, Japan; a neighbourhood and former town

Osaka

- Sakurajima Line, a rail line in Osaka, Japan
- Sakurajima Station, a rail station in Konohana-ku, Osaka, Japan

== People ==
Characters

- Mai Sakurajima, a fictional character from Rascal Does Not Dream of Bunny Girl Senpai

== Food ==
- Sakurajima daikon radish ("sakurajima"), a Japanese radish, a variety of daikon
- Sakurajima komikan orange ("sakurajima"), a Japanese orange, a variety of komikan

== Other uses ==
- Sakurajima Ferry, a ferry between Kagoshima Port and Sakurajima Port in the city of Kagoshima
- Sakurajima (novella), a novella by Japanese writer Haruo Umezaki

== See also ==
- Sakura (disambiguation)
- Jima (disambiguation)
