= West Japan JR Bus Service Company =

Japanese bus service

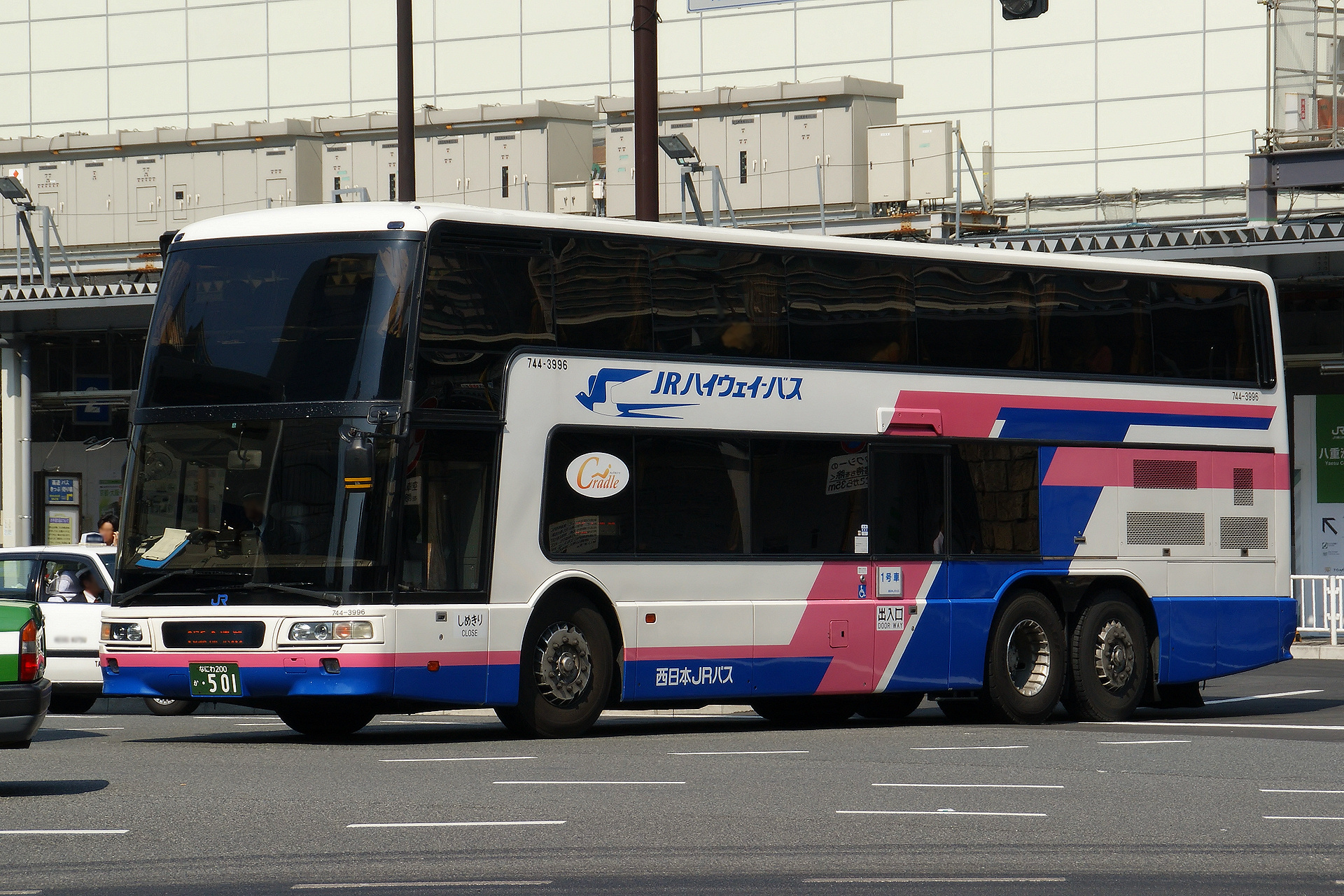
- A JR West Bus
- Founded: 1 October 2015; 11 years ago
- Headquarters: Konohana-ku, Osaka-shi, Osaka Prefecture, Japan
- Operating income: ▲¥445 million (2020 fiscal year)
- Net income: ▲¥13.7 million (March 2024)
- Number of employees: 145
- Website: http://www.wjbs.co.jp/

West Japan JR Bus Service Company is a subsidiary of West Japan JR Bus Company, headquartered in Konohana-ku, Osaka City, Osaka Prefecture. Together with its parent company, it belongs to the West Japan Railway Company (JR West Japan) Group. It is a member of the Japan Bus Association and the All Japan Travel Agents Association.

== Overview ==
The company was established on October 1, 2015, as a new division of Nishinippon Bus Net Service Co., Ltd. In January of the following year, 2016, the head office moved from 6-2-31 Toyosaki, Kita-ku, Osaka City, Osaka Prefecture to its current location.

In addition to operating chartered buses, the company will also be responsible for ancillary bus business tasks such as washing and cleaning buses, refueling, and directing them.

A total of 11 chartered buses belong to the Ajigawa Office.

== Business location ==
Source: Official website "Company Information - Company Overview"

- Head Office/Ajigawa Office: 1-3-23 Kitako, Konohana-ku, Osaka City, Osaka Prefecture (same location as * West Japan JR Bus Head Office/Osaka Expressway Management Office)
- Toyosaki Office: 2-31 Toyosaki 6-chome, Kita-ku, Osaka City, Osaka Prefecture (same location as West Japan JR Bus Osaka Kita Office. Former head office location)
- Kobe Office: 6-2 Minatojima 4-chome, Chuo-ku, Kobe, Hyogo Prefecture (same location as West Japan JR Bus Kobe Office)
- Kyoto Office: 120 Sannomiya-cho, Kisshoin, Minami-ku, Kyoto City, Kyoto Prefecture (same location as West Japan JR Bus Kyoto Office)
- Kanazawa Office: 3-3-85 Hirooka, Kanazawa City, Ishikawa Prefecture (same location as West Japan JR Bus Kanazawa Office)

== Vehicles ==
All of the buses are from the Ajigawa Office, and the colors are the same as those of the West Japan JR Bus vehicles, but the logo on the body is the West Japan JR Bus Service's company emblem and Nishinihon JR BUS Service. Also, the side of the body is decorated with an illustration of a swallow mark flying around the Japanese archipelago and the Japan tourism slogan "Japan. Endless Discovery."

The vehicles available are large high-decker buses with toilets, large super high-decker buses without toilets, large short salons, and micro wheelchair-accessible vehicles. All large vehicles are Hino Selega, and the microbuses are Nissan Civilian.

Like West Japan JR Bus, each vehicle is assigned a vehicle number.
