= Universal City Station =

Railway station in Osaka, Japan

Coordinates: 34°40′4.23″N 135°26′18.94″E

Universal City Station ユニバーサルシティ駅
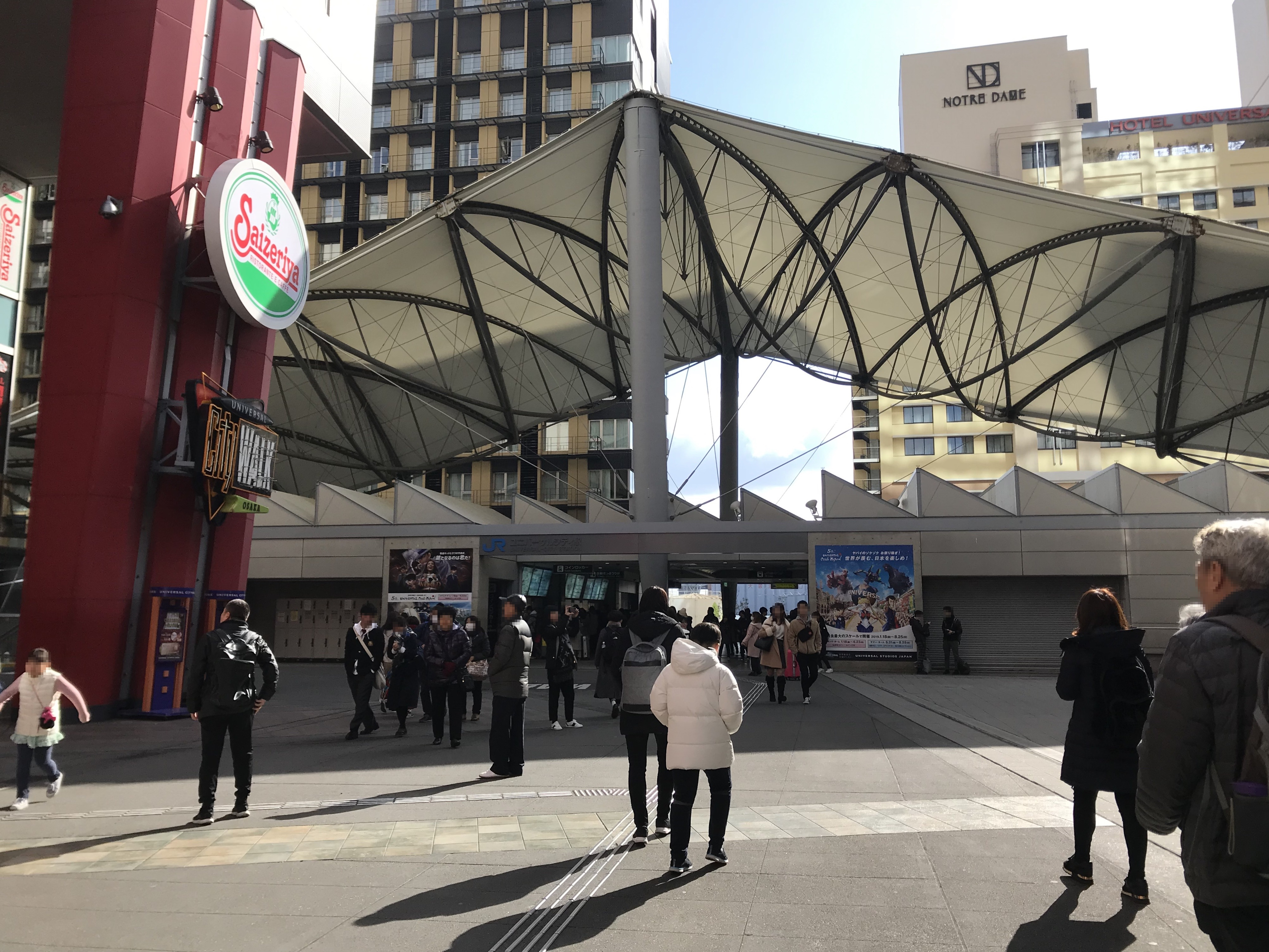
- Station entrance

General information
- Location: 2-28 Shimaya 6-chome, Konohana Ward, Osaka City; Osaka Prefecture; Japan
- Operator: JR West
- Line: P JR Yumesaki Line
- Platforms: 2 side platforms
- Tracks: 2

Construction
- Structure type: Ground level
- Accessible: Yes

Other information
- Station code: JR-P16

History
- Opened: 1 March 2001; 25 years ago

Passengers
- 2020: 13,179 daily

Services
Preceding station	JR West	Following station
Sakurajima Terminus	JR Yumesaki Line	Ajikawaguchi towards Nishikujō
Location
- Location within Osaka Prefecture Location within Kansai region Location within Japan

Universal City Station (ユニバーサルシティ駅, Yunibāsaru Shiti-eki) is a train station on the West Japan Railway Company (JR West) Sakurajima Line (JR Yumesaki Line) in Konohana-ku, Osaka, Japan.

== Layout ==
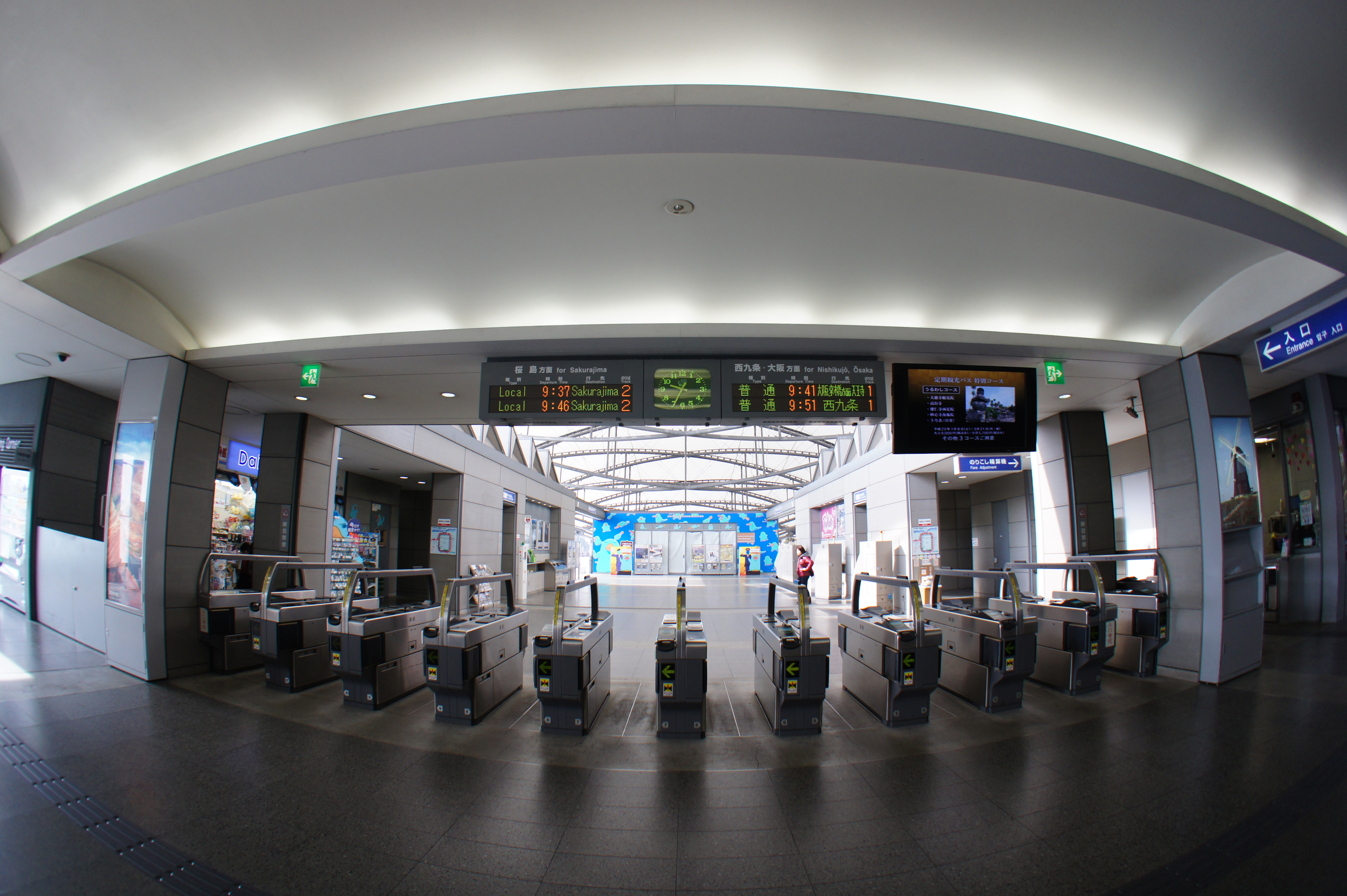
Paid area

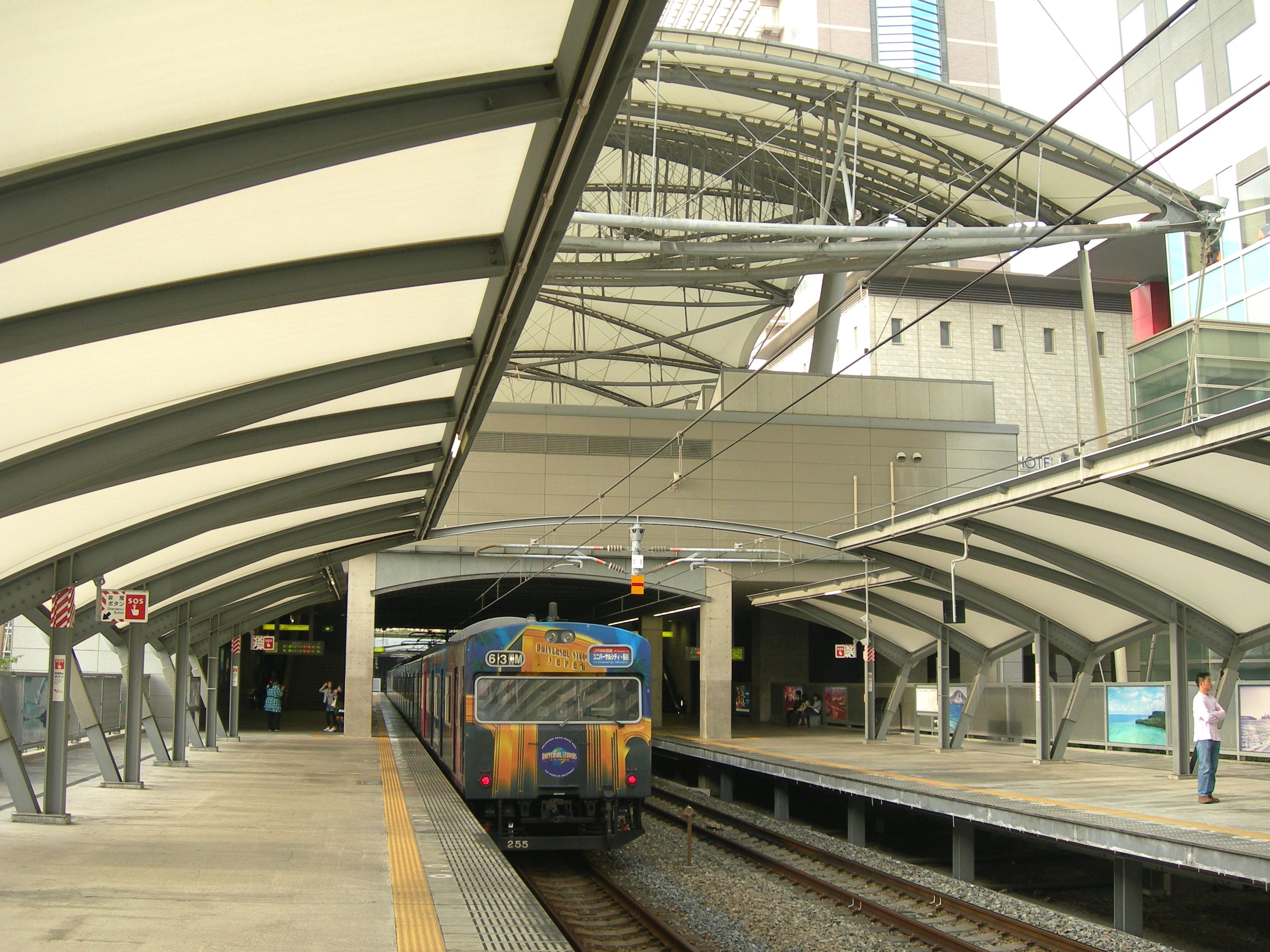
Platform

The station has two side platforms serving two tracks under the footbridge with ticket machines and ticket gates. The building of the station was designed by Tadao Ando (安藤 忠雄), an architect.

1	■ JR Yumesaki Line	for Nishikujō and Ōsaka
2	■ JR Yumesaki Line	to Sakurajima

== History ==
The station was built on 1 March 2001, for the Universal Studios Japan.

When service began at Universal City station, there were some protests by local residents and business owners to open a new station ("Haruhinode Station") between Nishi-Kujō and Ajikawaguchi stations. However, not enough demand was forecast and plans were shelved.

Station numbering was introduced in March 2018 with Universal City being assigned station number JR-P16.

== Surrounding area ==
- Universal Studios Japan
- Universal CityWalk Osaka
- Hotel Universal Port
- Hotel Kintetsu Universal City
- Hotel Keihan Universal City
- HOTEL KEIHAN UNIVERSAL TOWER
- The Park Front Hotel at Universal Studios Japan
