= Nishikujō Station =

Railway station in Osaka, Japan

Nishikujō Station 西九条駅

General information
- Location: Nishikujō, Konohana Ward, Osaka; Osaka Prefecture; Japan
- Operator: JR West; Hanshin Electric Railway
Location
- Location within Osaka Prefecture Location within Kansai region Location within Japan

Nishikujō Station (西九条駅, Nishikujō-eki) is a railway station located in Konohana-ku, Osaka, Japan. It is served by the Osaka Loop Line and the Sakurajima Line (JR Yumesaki Line) owned by West Japan Railway Company (JR West) as well as the Hanshin Namba Line owned by Hanshin Electric Railway.

== JR West ==
Nishikujō Station 西九条駅
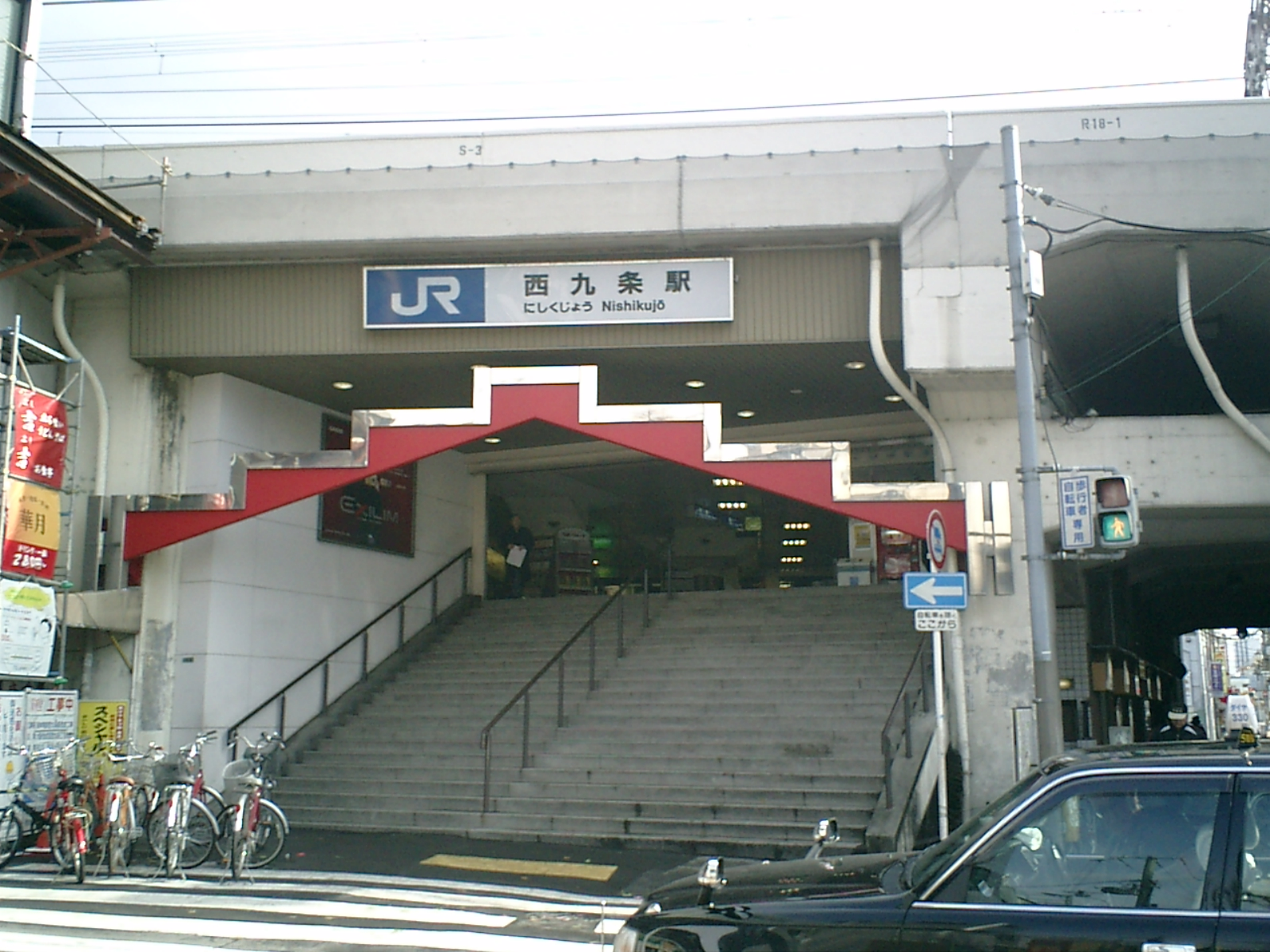
- JR West Nishikujō Station (2005)

General information
- Location: 1-32-18 Nishikujō, Konohana Ward, Osaka City; Osaka Prefecture; Japan
- Coordinates: 34°40′57.59″N 135°28′0.44″E
- System: JR West station
- Operator: JR West
- Lines: O Osaka Loop Line; P JR Yumesaki Line
- Platforms: 2 island platforms
- Tracks: 3

Construction
- Structure type: Elevated

Other information
- Station code: JR-O14 (Osaka Loop Line); JR-P14 (JR Yumesaki Line)

History
- Opened: 1 October 1898; 127 years ago

Passengers
- 2019: 31,176 daily

Services
Preceding station	JR West	Following station
Ajikawaguchi towards Sakurajima	JR Yumesaki Line	through to Osaka Loop Line
Location

At Nishikujō Station, regardless of the train type, through trains to/from the Osaka Loop Line and Sakurajima Line trains arrive and depart from center platforms 2 and 3 (there are two platforms on either side of a single central track). Also, some Osaka-bound trains depart from the Loop Line clockwise-bound platform and some Sakurajima-bound trains from the Loop Line counterclockwise platform.

=== Station layout ===
There are two island platforms with three tracks elevated.

1	■ Osaka Loop Line (clockwise, mainly from Tennoji)	for Osaka and Kyōbashi
1	■ JR Kyoto Line	limited express trains "Kuroshio" for Shin-Osaka and Kyōto
2	■ JR Yumesaki Line	for Universal City and Sakurajima
2	■ Osaka Loop Line (clockwise)	from the JR Yumesaki Line for Osaka and Kyōbashi
3	■ JR Yumesaki Line	for Universal City and Sakurajima
3	■ Kinokuni Line (from Shin-Osaka)	limited express trains "Kuroshio" for Shirahama and Shingu
4	■ Osaka Loop Line (counterclockwise)	for Bentenchō, Shin-Imamiya and Tennōji
4	■ Yamatoji Line	for Nara
4	■ Kansai Airport Line	Kansai Airport rapid services for Kansai Airport
4	■ Hanwa Line (from Osaka)	for Wakayama
4	■ JR Yumesaki Line	part of through trains for Universal City and Sakurajima

=== Adjacent stations ===
«	Service	»
Osaka Loop Line
Noda	Local	Bentencho
Noda	Regional Rapid Service	Bentencho
Noda	Direct Rapid Service (Clockwise trains only)	Bentencho
Fukushima	Yamatoji Rapid Service	Bentencho
Fukushima	Rapid Service; Kansai Airport Rapid Service; Kishuji Rapid Service	Bentencho
Osaka	Limited Express Kuroshio	Tennoji
Kansai Airport Limited Express Haruka: Does not stop at this station
Sakurajima Line (JR Yumesaki Line)
Noda (Osaka Loop Line)	Local (including shuttle trains)	Ajikawaguchi

=== History ===
Station numbering was introduced in March 2018 with Nishikujo being assigned station numbers JR-O14 for the Osaka Loop Line and JR-P14 for the Sakurajima Line.

== Hanshin Electric Railway ==
Nishikujō Station 西九条駅
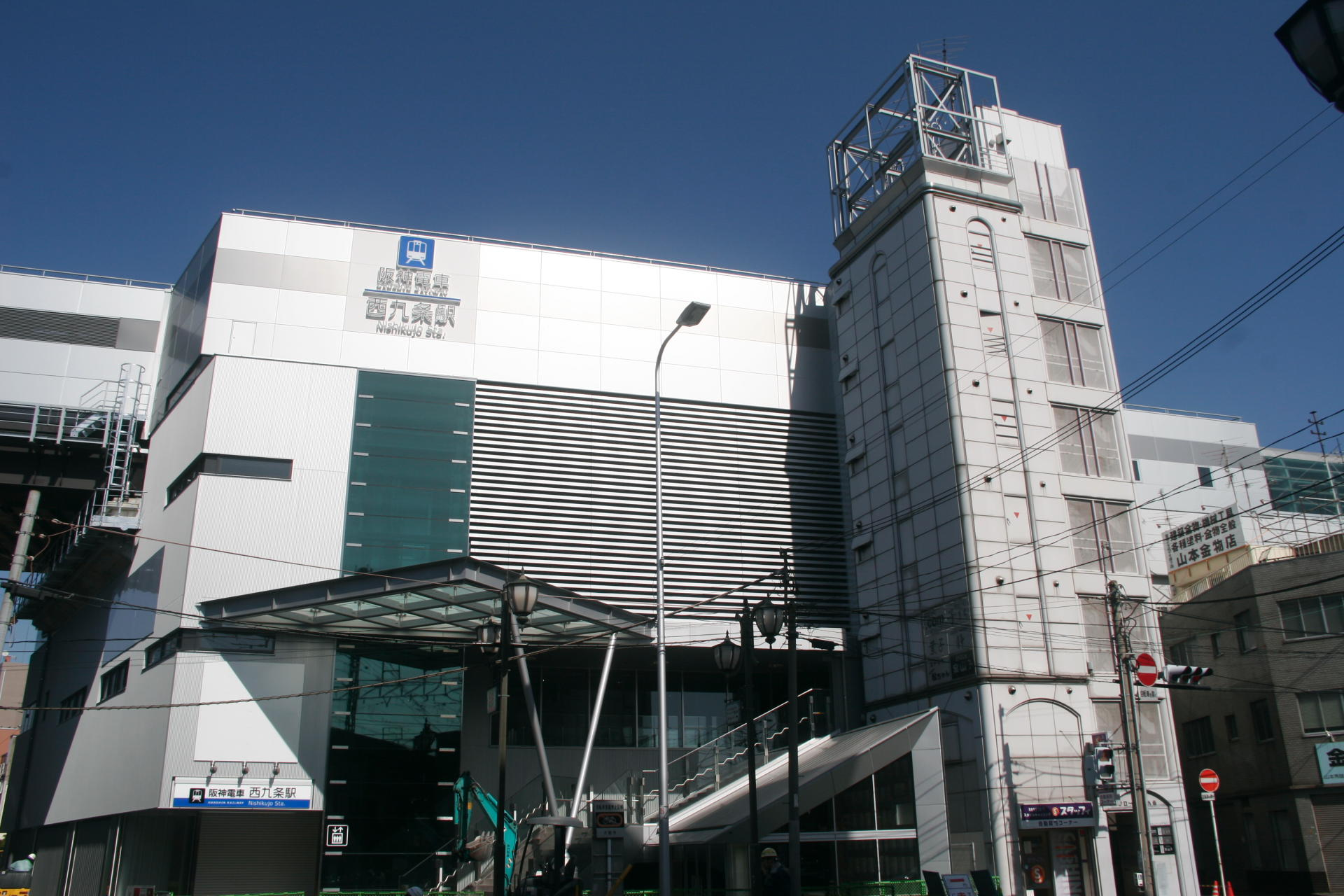
- East entrance (2009)

General information
- Location: 3-15 Nishikujō, Konohana, Osaka, Osaka （大阪市此花区西九条3丁目15） Japan
- Coordinates: 34°40′57.39″N 135°27′57.32″E
- System: Hanshin Railway station
- Operator: Hanshin Electric Railway Co., Ltd.
- Line: Hanshin Namba Line

Other information
- Station code: HS 45

History
- Opened: 21 May 1964

Passengers
- 2009: 22,071 daily
Location

The station opened on 21 May 1964.

=== Station layout ===
The station was constructed with the level of tracks which cross over the Osaka Loop Line to schedule to extend to Namba.

The station consists of two elevated side platforms serving a track each. When the station opened, Platform 1 was rarely used while Platform 2 was used for trains bound for Amagasaki. Between 1965 and 1974 when Nishi-Osaka limited express trains were operated, Platform 1 was used for these trains. Until the opening of the Hanshin Namba Line in 2009, the track (platform) was used as the arrival platform from January 23 until February 23.

1	■ Hanshin Namba Line	for Dome-mae, Ōsaka Namba, Ikoma, Yamato-Saidaiji and Nara
2	■ Hanshin Namba Line	for Amagasaki, Koshien and Kobe Sannomiya; Change trains at Amagasaki or Kobe Sannomiya for Akashi and Himeji

=== Adjacent stations ===
«	Service	»
Hanshin Namba Line (HS 45)
Chidoribashi (HS 46)	Local	Kujō (HS 44)
Chidoribashi (HS 46)	Semi-Express; Suburban Semi-Express	Kujō (HS 44)
Amagasaki (HS 09)	Rapid Express	Kujō (HS 44)

All rapid express trains pass Chidoribashi, Dempo, Fuku, Dekijima, and Daimotsu every day from March 20, 2012, and suburban semi-express trains run to Amagasaki instead.

== Surrounding area ==
- Yoshinoya JR Nishikujo
- Nishikujo Park
- Asahibashi Park, Nishikujo Community Plaza
- Creo Osaka West Building
- Osaka Municipal Fire Department Konohana Fire Station Nishikujo Branch
- Ajikawa Tunnel

== Bus service ==
Operated by Osaka Municipal Transportation Bureau

- Nishikujō (West side of Nishikujō Station)
  - Route 82: for Takami Itchome
- Nishikujō (North side of Nishikujō Station)
  - Route 56: for Torishima Shako-mae via Kasugade and Shimaya / for Osaka ekimae (Osaka Station) via Subway Tamagawa and Fukushima-nishi-dori
  - Route 59: for Torishima Shako-mae and Hokko Yacht Harbor / for Nodahanshin-mae and Osaka ekimae (Osaka Station) via Fukushima Kuyakusho-mae
  - Route 79: for Sakurajima Sanchome via Kasugade-minami Nichome and Shimaya
  - Route 81: for Maishima Sports Island
