= Ōsaka Station =

Major railway and metro station in Osaka, Japan

Ōsaka Station 大阪駅
- Ōsaka Station in 2026

General information
- Location: 1-1 Umeda Sanchōme, Kita Ward, Osaka City; Osaka Prefecture; Japan
- Coordinates: 34°42′09″N 135°29′46″E
- Operator: JR West
- Lines: F Osaka Higashi Line; Via Tōkaidō Main Line; A JR Kōbe Line; A JR Kyōto Line; G JR Takarazuka Line; Via Osaka Loop Line; O Osaka Loop Line; P JR Yumesaki Line; Q Yamatoji Line; R Hanwa Line
- Platforms: 7 island platforms and 1 side platform
- Tracks: 15
- Connections: Bus terminal; Osaka Metro: Yotsubashi Line at Nishi-Umeda; Midōsuji Line at Umeda; Tanimachi Line at Higashi-Umeda; Hankyu Railway at Umeda; Kōbe Main Line; Takarazuka Main Line; Kyoto Main Line; Hanshin Main Line at Umeda; JR Tozai Line at Kitashinchi

Construction
- Structure type: Elevated (Tracks 1–11); Underground (Tracks 21–24)

Other information
- Station code: JR-A47 (Kyoto/Kobe Line); JR-G47 (Takarazuka Line); JR-O11 (Osaka Loop Line); JR-F01 (Osaka Higashi Line)

History
- Opened: 11 May 1874; 152 years ago

Passengers
- FY 2023: 734,838 daily
Location
- Location within Osaka city Location within Osaka Prefecture Location within Japan

Ōsaka Station (大阪駅, Ōsaka-eki) is a major railway station in the Umeda district of Kita-ku, Osaka, Japan, operated by West Japan Railway Company (JR West). It forms as one of the city's main railway terminals to the north, the other being Shin-Ōsaka.

Although it is officially served by only the JR Kobe/Kyoto Lines (Tōkaidō Main Line) and the Osaka Loop Line, Ōsaka is the starting point of JR Takarazuka Line service, and serves as the terminal for trains bound for the San'in region via JR Takarazuka Line and the Hokuriku region via JR Kyoto Line, while offering connections to trains bound for Nara, Wakayama and Kansai International Airport via the Osaka Loop Line.

Umeda Station (Hankyu, Hanshin, and Osaka Metro Midosuji Line), Nishi-Umeda Station (Subway Yotsubashi Line) and Higashi-Umeda Station (Subway Tanimachi Line) are directly connected to Ōsaka Station, and Kitashinchi Station on the JR Tozai Line is within walking distance.

Ōsaka Station and Umeda Station, effectively part of the same complex, together constitute the busiest station in Western Japan, serving 2,343,727 passengers daily in 2005, and the fourth-busiest railway station in the world.

Ōsaka Station also houses a large terminal for overnight bus services to other cities in Japan, and until March 2013 also had a nearby freight terminal complex, Umeda Freight Terminal, owned by JR Freight.

== Station layout ==
Osaka Station City

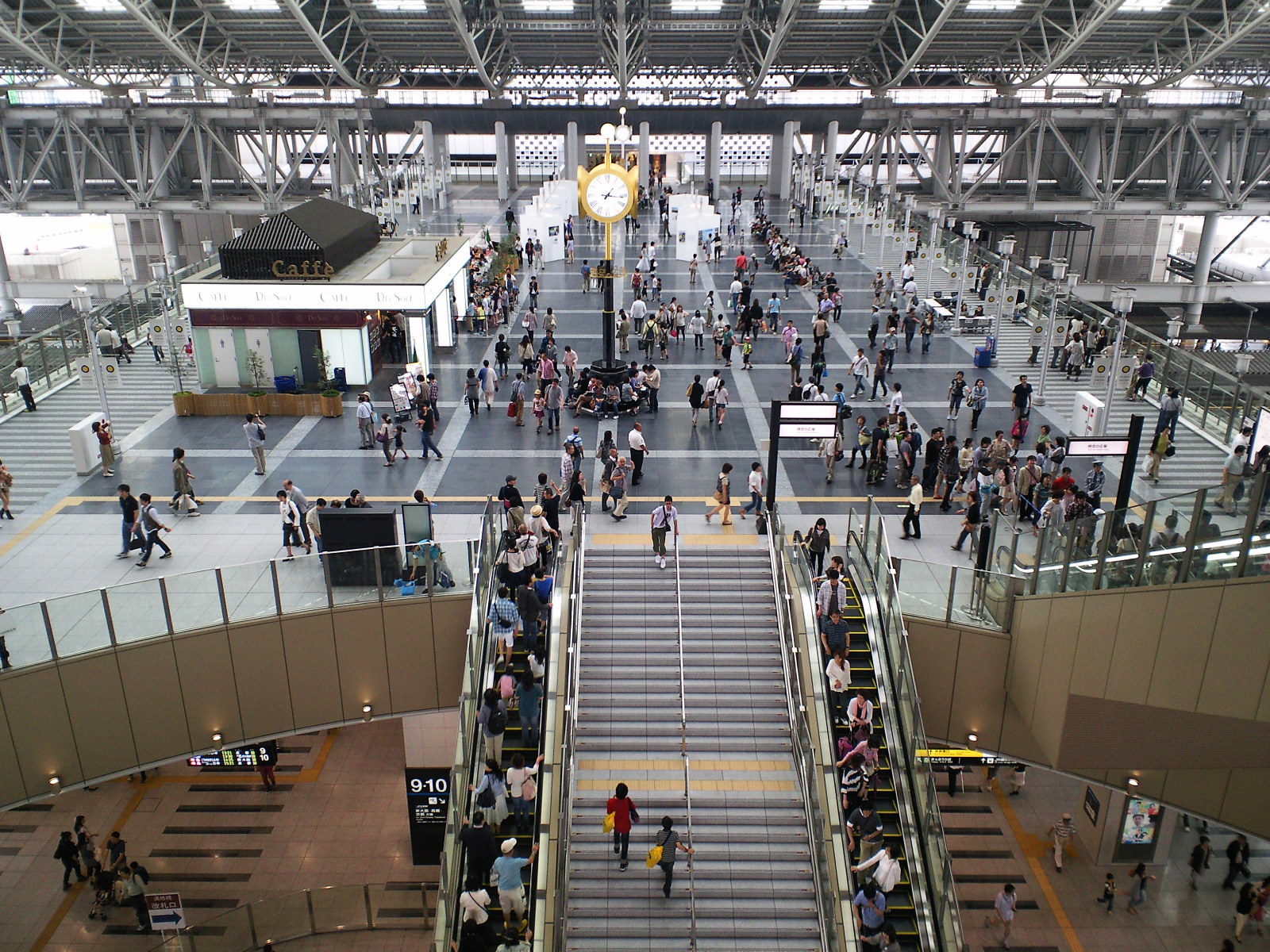
Ōsaka Station Toki no hiroba plaza in June 2011

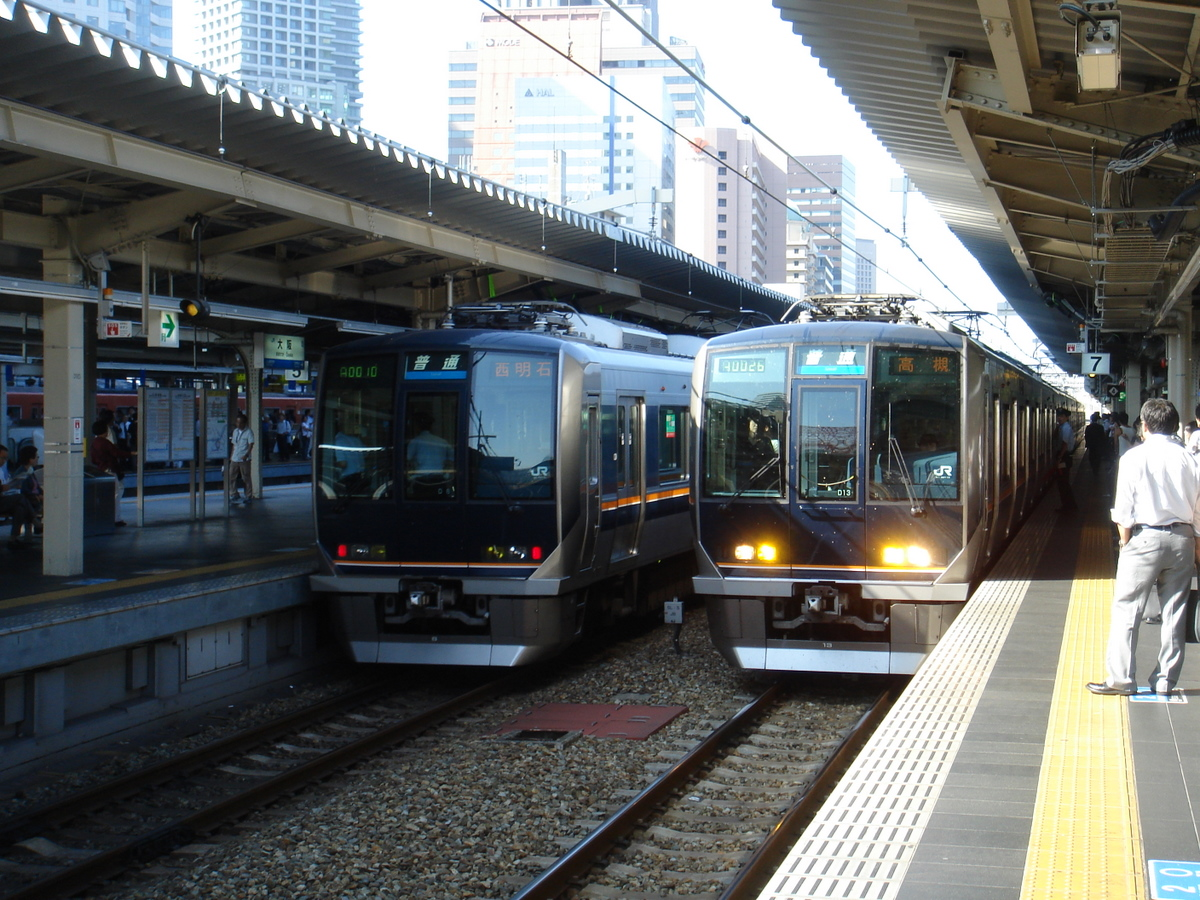
Commuter trains at Ōsaka Station

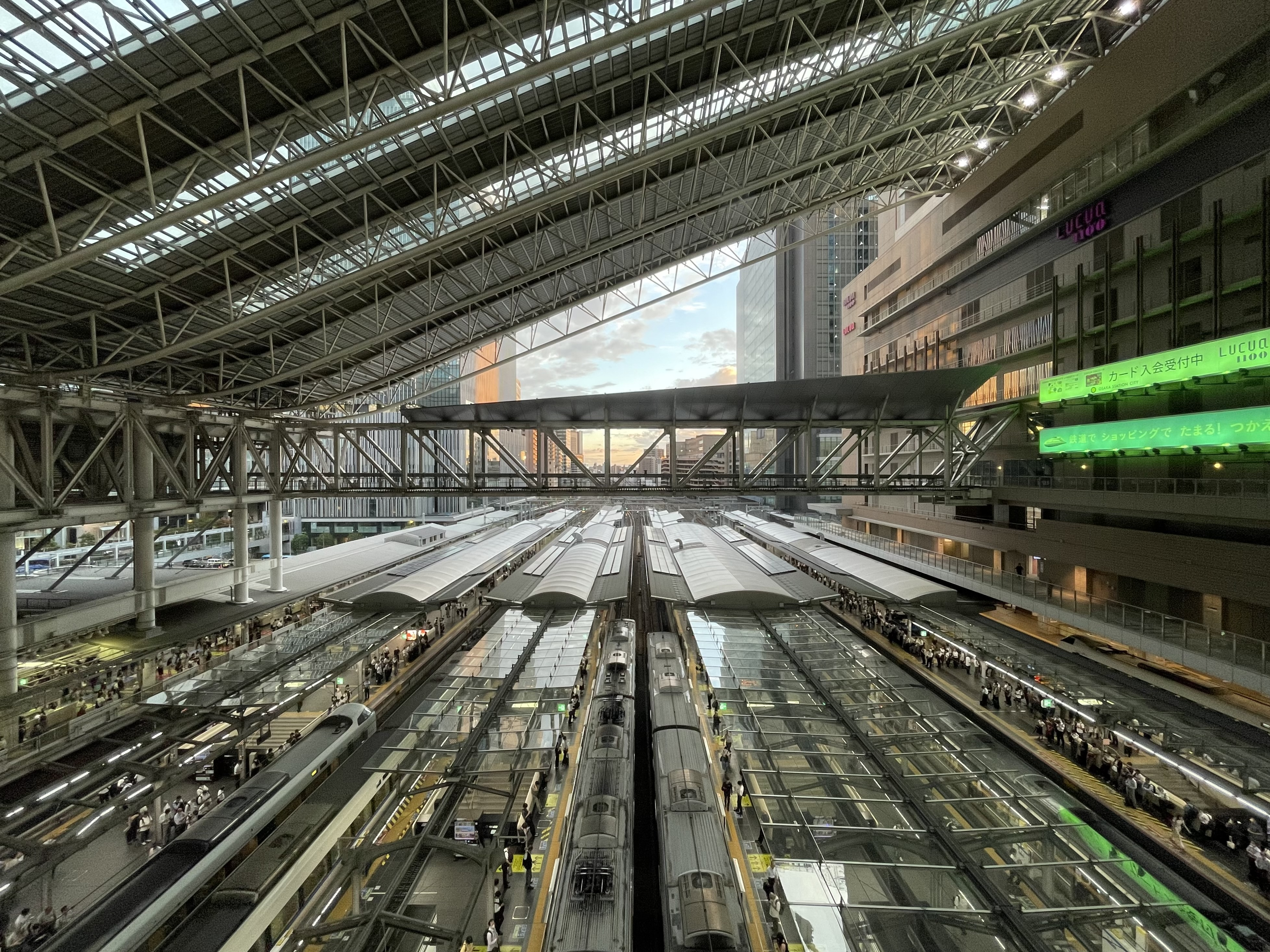
Train platforms at Ōsaka Station

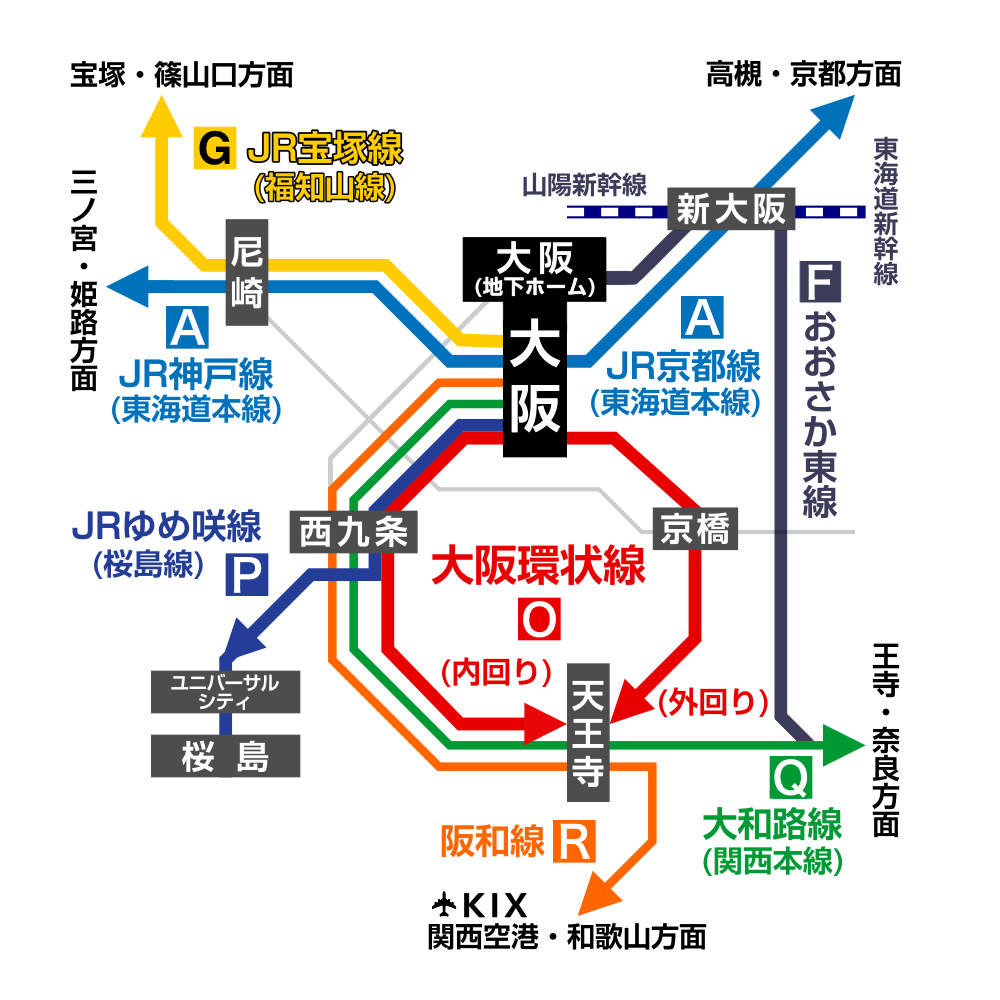
Route map of trains departing from Osaka Station in 2023

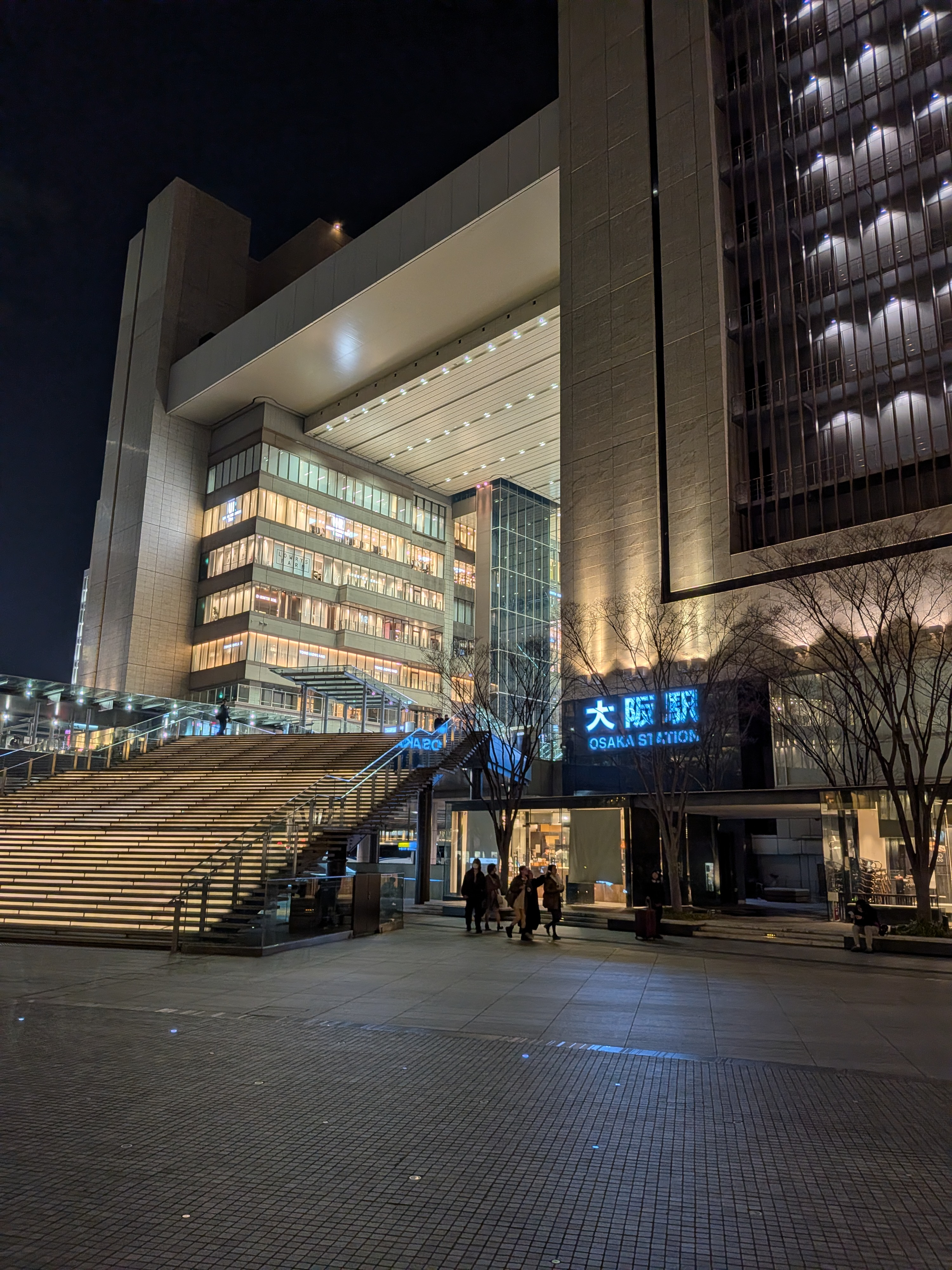
Osaka Station Building (North)

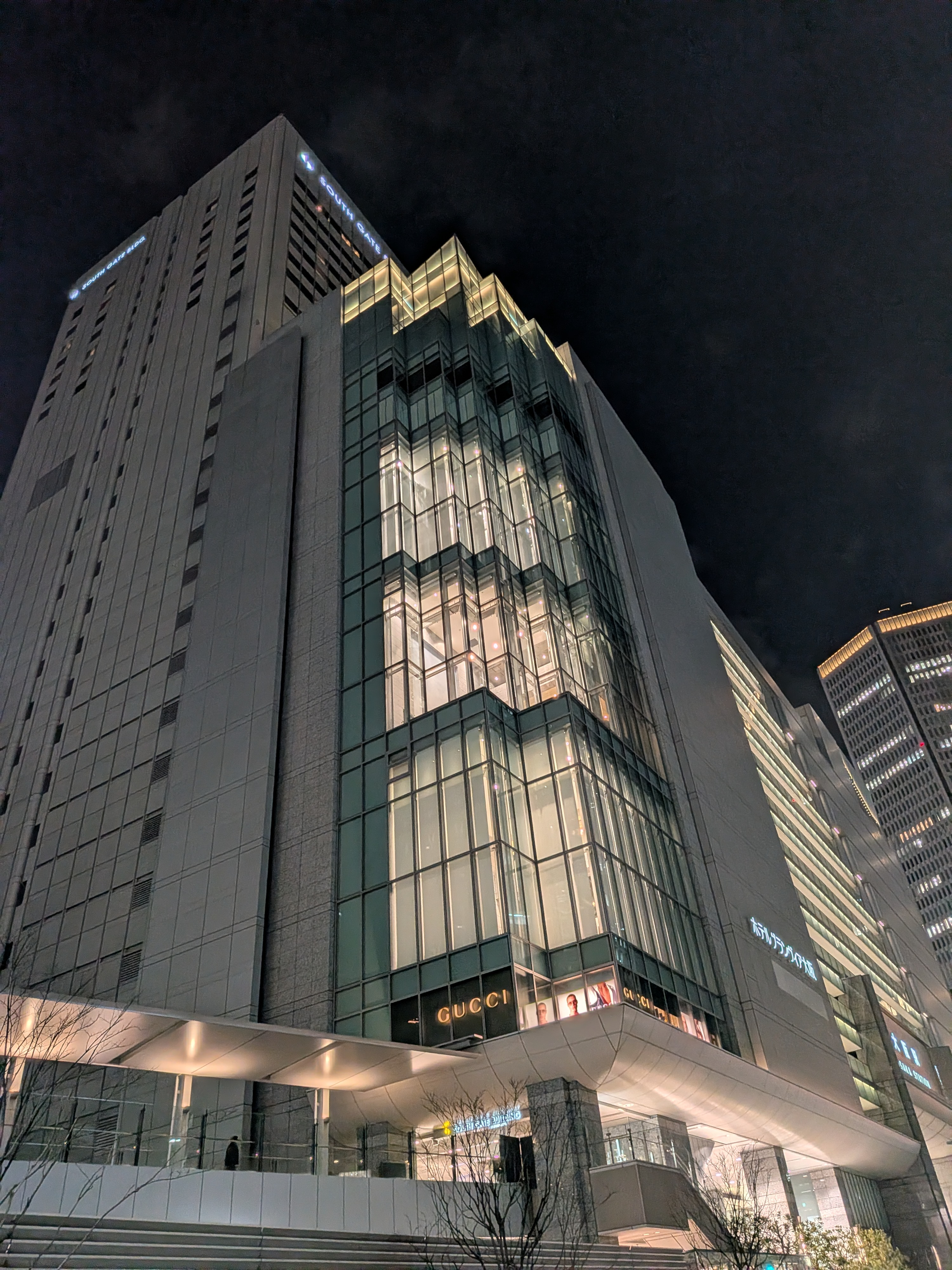
Osaka Station Building (South)

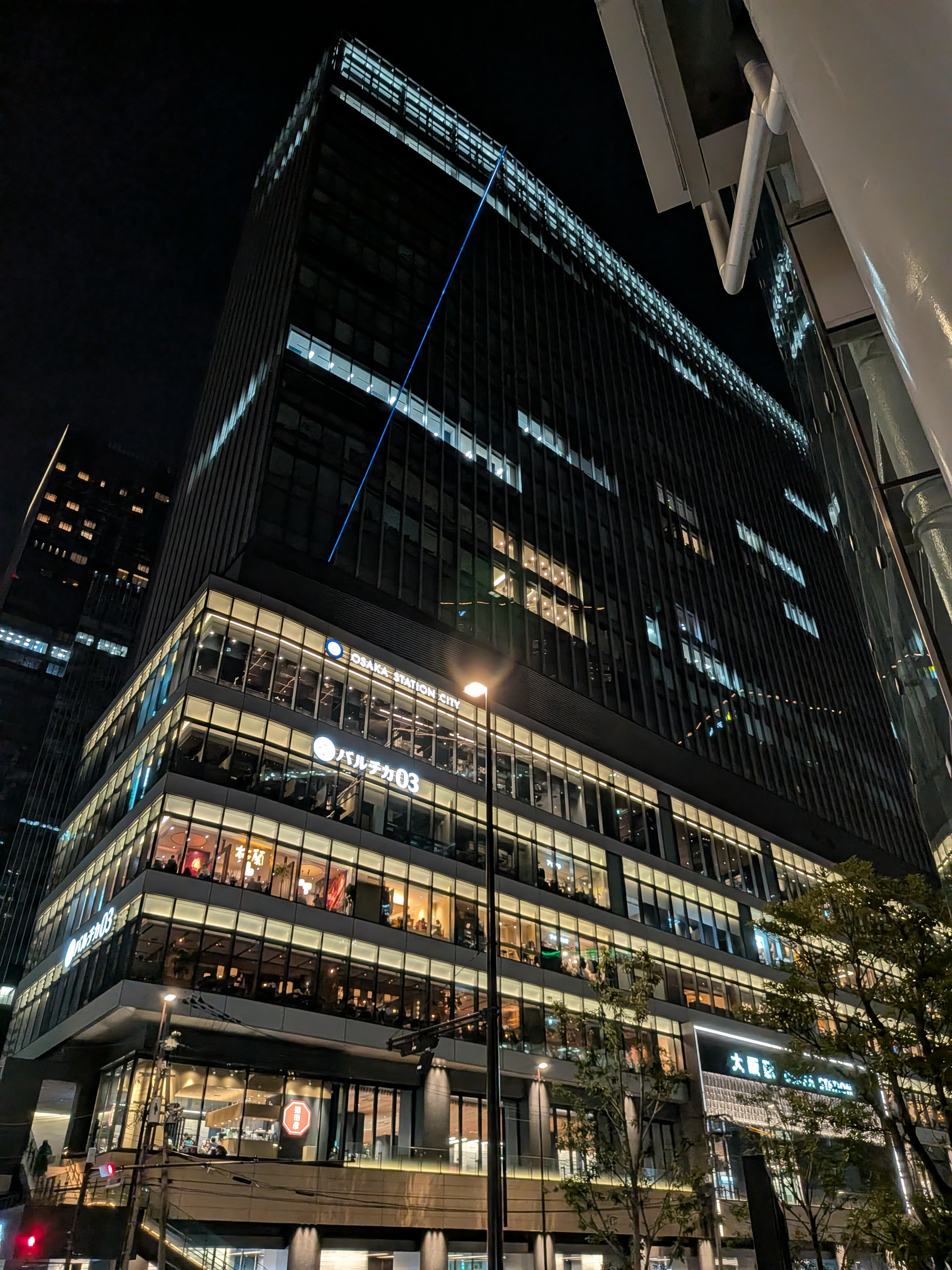
Osaka Station Building (Inogate Osaka)

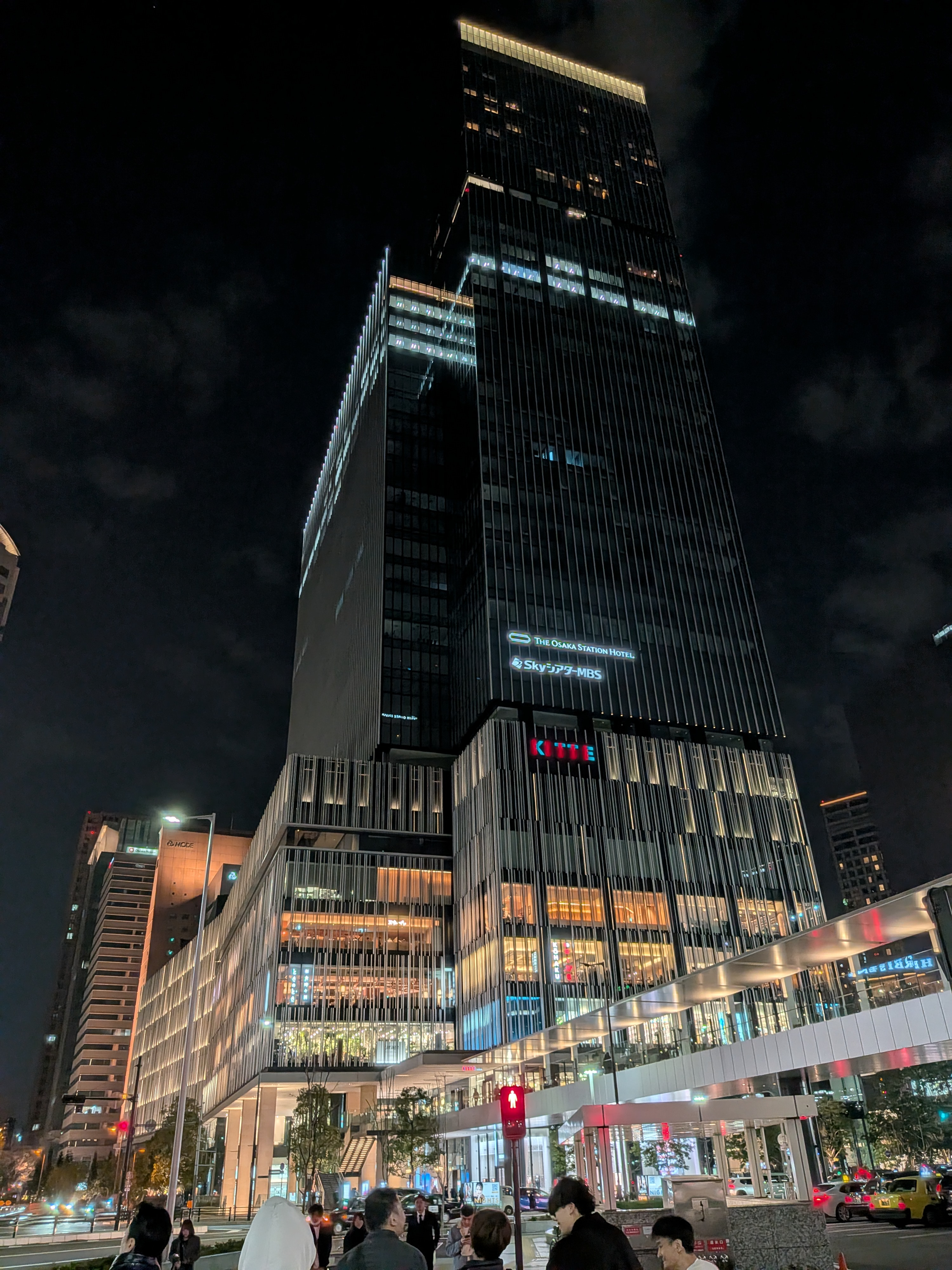
Osaka Station Building (JP Tower Osaka)

Ōsaka station is elevated above street level, on the second floor of the station complex. There are four concourses, corresponding to four sets of ticket gates: the Midosuji gates, serving as a transfer point to Hankyu and Subway Umeda Station and Higashi-Umeda Station; the Central gates, with access to Daimaru, Lucua, Yodobashi Camera, Umeda Sky Building, Grand Front and transfers to Hanshin Umeda and JR Kitashinchi Station; the Sakurabashi gates, with access to Ōsaka Garden City and transfers to Subway Nishi-Umeda Station, city bus, hotel shuttle buses and taxi; and the Bridge Gates, with direct access into Daimaru and Lucua, as well as a bridge passage to Hankyu Umeda. The Midosuji concourse is on the lower level, with escalators and elevators leading directly to platforms; the Central concourse has both direct escalators and a mezzanine-level transfer passage connected by stairs; the Sakurabashi concourse has gates on ground level but is primarily on the mezzanine level, connected to the central concourse by a corridor; and the Bridge Gate is on the third level above the platforms, and connected by escalators and elevators. An additional concourse is planned for the west side of the station, which will link the elevated platforms with the under-construction underground platforms to the northwest of the main station.

Platforms and tracks are on the second floor. There were previously six island platforms and one side platform serving 13 tracks; the highest-numbered track was Track 11, as the Osaka Loop Line tracks were referred to as "Inner Loop" and "Outer Loop" only. In preparation for the construction of the new north building, the sixth platform was closed and the seventh was removed altogether; at the same time, the remaining platforms were renumbered so that Tracks 1 and 2 were for the Ōsaka Loop Line, and so on. The sixth platform reopened on 20 December 2009 and there became five island platforms and a side platform serving 11 tracks in total (up to the new Track 11—the old Track 9). The remainder of the old Track 11 platform, on the west side of the station, was used as a pedestrian walkway linking the North Gate Building with its parking garage until 2020, when it was removed to facilitate construction of a new West Gate Building. There was originally a through track in between tracks 8 and 9, but it had been long disused; during the closure of Track 11, the platform for Tracks 9 and 10 was expanded and this track was used temporarily as Track 9. Since 12 October 2010, this track has been used permanently as Track 8 after the widening of the adjoining platform.

An additional four tracks are located under the northwest side of the station complex, via relocated underground JR Freight tracks (Umeda branch line) originally used for Umeda Freight Station. Opened for passenger service on 18 March 2023, these tracks serve as the western terminus of the Osaka Higashi Line, with single track connection for continuing Umeda branch freight service as well as Haruka and Kuroshio limited express services. In 2021 this was projected to cost approximately ¥69 billion. There is also a stub tunnel west of the platforms, for planned connection to the Naniwasuji Line.

=== Platforms ===
1	■ Osaka Loop Line	inner track (counter-clockwise) for Nishikujō, Bentenchō, Shin-Imamiya and Tennōji
1	■ JR Yumesaki Line	for Universal City and Sakurajima
1	■ Yamatoji Line	for Tennōji, Ōji and Nara
1	■ Hanwa Line	for Tennōji and Wakayama
1	■ Kansai Airport Line	for Tennōji and Kansai Airport
2	■ Osaka Loop Line	outer track (clockwise) for Kyōbashi, Tsuruhashi and Tennoji
3	■ JR Takarazuka Line; Fukuchiyama Line	for Takarazuka, Sanda, Sasayamaguchi and Fukuchiyama
3	■ limited express "Kounotori"	for Fukuchiyama, Toyooka and Kinosaki Onsen
3	■ limited express "Super Hakuto"	for Tottori and Kurayoshi
3	■ JR Kobe Line	rapid services (weekday mornings) and special rapid services (weekday rush hours) for Sannomiya, Nishi-Akashi and Himeji
4	■ JR Takarazuka Line; Fukuchiyama Line	for Takarazuka, Sanda, Sasayamaguchi and Fukuchiyama
4	■ limited express "Kounotori"	for Fukuchiyama, Toyooka and Kinosaki Onsen
4	■ JR Kobe Line	special rapid services for Sannomiya, Akashi and Himeji (weekday rush hours)
4	■ limited express "Hamakaze"	for Toyooka, Kinosaki Onsen, Hamasaka and Tottori
5	■ JR Kobe Line	rapid services and special rapid services for Sannomiya, Nishi-Akashi and Himeji
6	■ JR Kobe Line	local trains for Tachibana and Kōshienguchi
6	■ JR Takarazuka Line	from the JR Kyoto Line (local trains) for Tsukaguchi and Inadera
7	■ JR Kyoto Line	local trains for Shin-Ōsaka and Suita
8	■ JR Kyoto Line	rapid services and special rapid services for Shin-Ōsaka, Takatsuki, Kyoto and Maibara
9, 10	■ JR Kyoto Line	rapid services (weekday mornings) and special rapid services (weekday rush hours) for Shin-Ōsaka, Takatsuki, Kyoto and Maibara
10	■ Commuter limited express "Biwako Express"	for Maibara
11	■ limited express "Thunderbird"	for Tsuruga
11	■ limited express "Hida"	for Gifu and Takayama
11	■ Sleeper limited express "Sunrise Izumo" "Sunrise Seto"	for Tokyo

==== Underground platforms (Umekita Area) ====
21	■ limited express "Haruka", "Kuroshio"	for Kansai Airport, Wakayama, Shirahama and Shingu
22, 23	■ Osaka Higashi Line	for Shin-Ōsaka, Hanaten and Kyūhōji
24	■ limited express "Haruka", "Kuroshio"	for Shin-Ōsaka and Kyoto

=== Limited express trains ===
for the Hokuriku Line

- Limited express Thunderbird (Osaka - Tsuruga)

for the Tokaido Line and the Takayama Line

- Sleeper limited express Sunrise Izumo/Sunrise Seto (Takamatsu/Izumoshi → Tokyo) - Tokyo-bound train only
- Limited express Hida (Osaka - Takayama)
- Commuter limited express Rakuraku Biwako (Osaka - Kusatsu, Maibara)

for the Sanyo Line

- Commuter limited express Rakuraku Harima (Osaka - Himeji)

for Nara via the Osaka Loop Line and the Yamatoji Line

- Commuter limited express Rakuraku Yamato (Shin-Osaka - Osaka - Tennoji - Kyuhoji - Oji - Nara)

for Nara via the Osaka Higashi Line and the Yamatoji Line

- Limited express Mahoroba (Osaka - Shin-Osaka - Horyuji - Nara)

for the San'in region

- Limited express Super Hakuto (Kyoto - Tottori, Kurayoshi) via the Chizu Express Chizu Line
- Limited express Hamakaze (Osaka - Kasumi, Hamasaka, Tottori) via the Bantan Line

for the north area of the Kansai region via the Fukuchiyama Line

- Limited express Kounotori (Shin-Osaka - Fukuchiyama, Toyooka, Kinosaki-Onsen)

for the Kansai Airport Line via the Osaka Loop Line and the Hanwa Line

- Limited express Haruka (Yasu - Kyoto - Shin-Osaka - Osaka - Tennoji - Kansai Airport)

for the Kisei Main Line via the Osaka Loop Line and the Hanwa Line

- Limited express Kuroshio (Kyoto - Shin-Osaka - Osaka - Tennoji - Wakayama - Shirahama - Kushimoto - Shingu)

== Adjacent stations ==
«	Service	»
Tokaido Line (JR Kyoto Line, JR Kobe Line)
Shizuoka CA17	Sleeper Limited Express Sunrise Seto & Sleeper Limited Express Sunrise Izumo (eastbound)	Sannomiya (JR-A61)
Terminus	Commuter Limited Express Rakuraku Harima & Limited Express Hamakaze	Sannomiya (JR-A61)
Shin-Ōsaka (JR-A46)	West Express Ginga (San'yo and San'in Routes)	Sannomiya (JR-A61)
Shin-Ōsaka (JR-A46)	Limited Express Super Hakuto	Sannomiya (JR-A61)
Shin-Ōsaka (JR-A46)	Limited Express Thunderbird, Limited Express Hida and Commuter Limited Express Rakuraku Biwako	Terminus
Shin-Ōsaka (JR-A46)	Special Rapid Service	Amagasaki (JR-A49)
Shin-Ōsaka (JR-A46)	Rapid Service(including terminating JR Takarazuka Line trains)	Amagasaki (JR-A49)
Shin-Ōsaka (JR-A46)	Local (Including through to and from the JR Takarazuka Line)	Tsukamoto (JR-A48)
Through to and from the Fukuchiyama Line (JR Takarazuka Line)
Shin-Ōsaka (JR-A46)	Limited Express Kounotori	Amagasaki (JR-G49)
Terminus	Tambaji Rapid Service	Amagasaki (JR-G49)
Terminus	Rapid Service	Amagasaki (JR-G49)
Terminus	Regional Rapid Service	Amagasaki (JR-G49)
Terminus	Local trains originating from and terminating at Osaka	Amagasaki (JR-G49)
Osaka Loop Line
Shin-Ōsaka (JR-A46)	West Express Ginga (Kisei Route)	Tennōji (JR-R20)
Shin-Ōsaka (JR-A46)	Kansai Airport Limited Express Haruka	Tennōji (JR-R20)
Shin-Ōsaka (JR-A46)	Limited Express Kuroshio	Tennōji (JR-R20)
Temma (JR-O10)	All services	Fukushima (JR-O12)
Osaka Higashi Line
Shin-Osaka (JR-F02)	Limited Express Mahoroba	Terminus
Shin-Osaka (JR-F02)	Direct Rapid Service	Terminus
Shin-Osaka (JR-F02)	Local	Terminus

== History ==
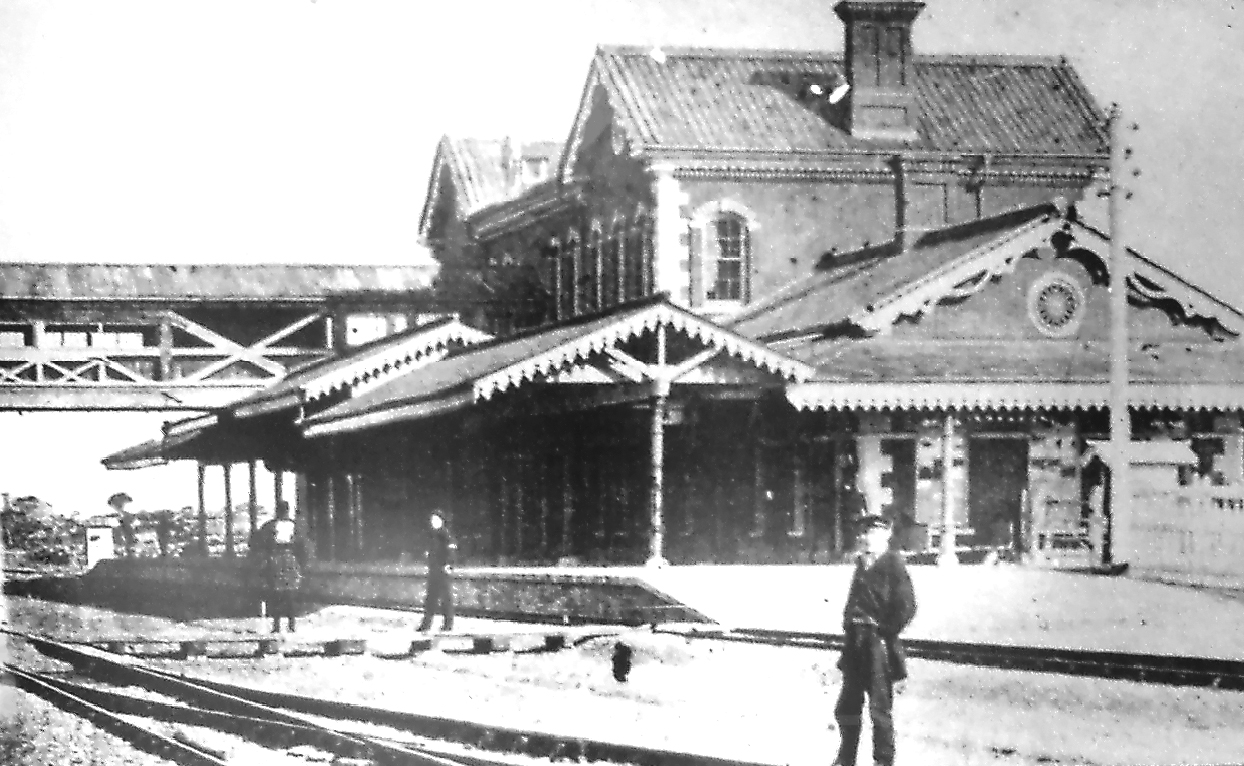
1874 building

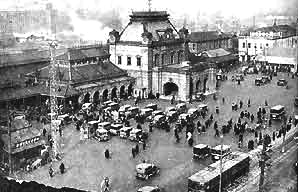
1901 building

Osaka Station opened on 11 May 1874, as one of the first railway stations in the Kansai region when the railway between Osaka and Kobe started operation. It was electrified along with the Tōkaidō Main Line in 1934.

The existence of the station naturally made the area the primary transport hub of the city. Railways that set Ōsaka Station as the terminal or built their terminal around Osaka Station include Osaka Railway (present-day east half of the Osaka Loop Line) in 1895, Nishinari Railway (west half of the Osaka Loop Line) in 1898, Hanshin Electric Railway in 1906, Minoo Arima Electric Tramway (Hankyu Railway) in 1910, and Osaka Municipal Subway in 1933. The regional railways tended to name their stations Umeda, the name of the area, rather than the city name.

The air raids in World War II flattened the blocks in front of the station. Immediately after the war, the area turned into a huge black market, the atmosphere of which remained until redevelopment in the 1970s.

The station building was rebuilt in 1901, 1940, and 1979 (north building). In 1983, a high-rise building, Acty Osaka, which housed a department store and a hotel, was added to the south of the station.

A new north station building (the North Gate Building) was opened in 2011, coinciding with an expansion of Acty Osaka (now the South Gate Building) and major renovation of the station areas with a new concourse and north–south connection. This is the first step in a larger drive to redevelop the land used by JR Freight's Umeda Terminal, which is seen as the last undeveloped piece of real estate in the area. Plans also call for moving the Umeda Freight Line underground and establishing a terminal for the Osaka Higashi Line just north of ALBi, with an eye towards a future extension to JR Namba Station (thus alleviating delays on the Osaka Loop Line caused by Limited Express trains). The relocation of the former Umeda Freight line (and related redevelopments) ultimately became part of the Naniwasuji Line project in 2019.

Station numbering was introduced in March 2018 with the Tokaido Line platforms being assigned station number JR-A47, the Fukuchiyama Line platforms being assigned station number JR-G48, and the Osaka Loop Line platforms being assigned station number JR-O11.

The new underground facilities at Osaka Station (nicknamed Ume-kita during planning and construction) opened for service from the start of the revised timetable on 18 March 2023. In preparation for the opening, all limited express trains running on the Umeda Freight Line were re-routed through the new underground tracks in February 2023.

=== Major renovation ===
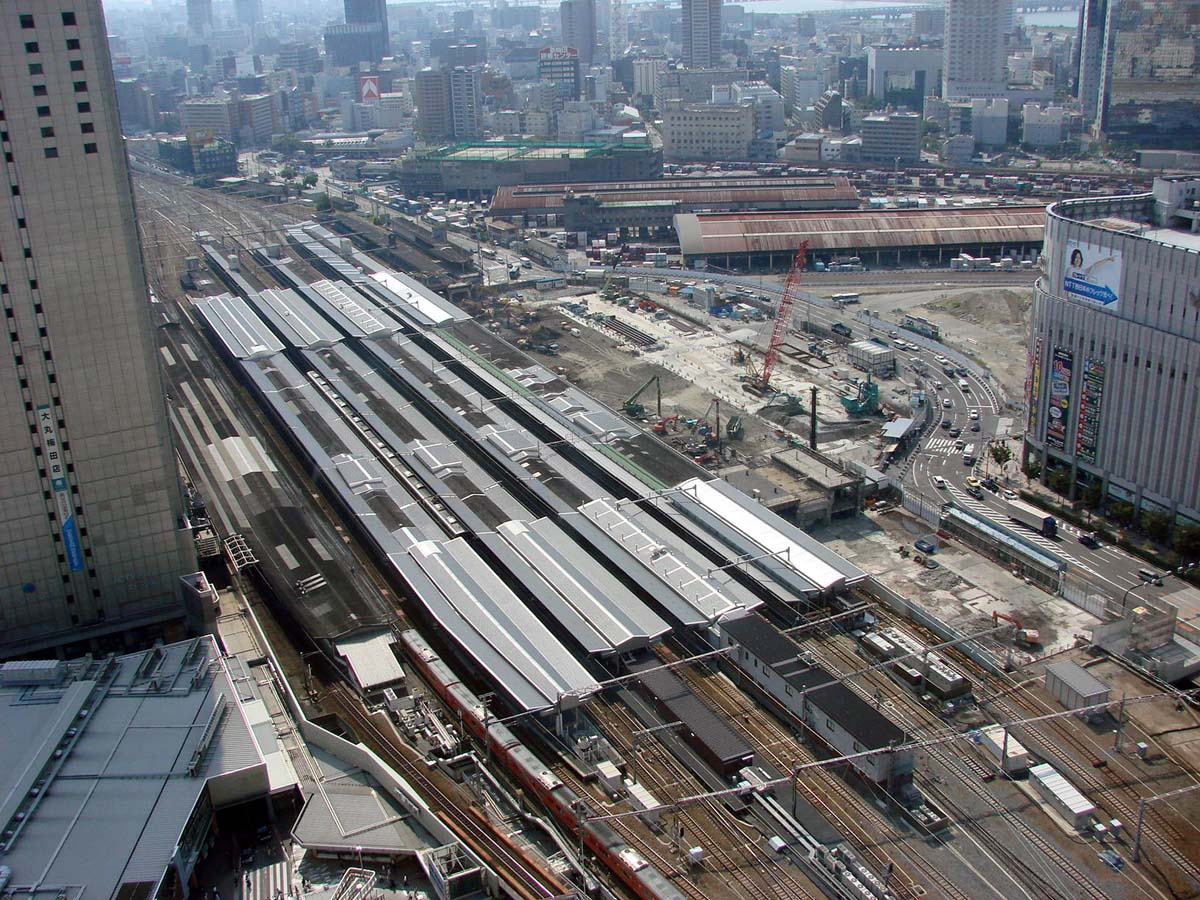
August 2007

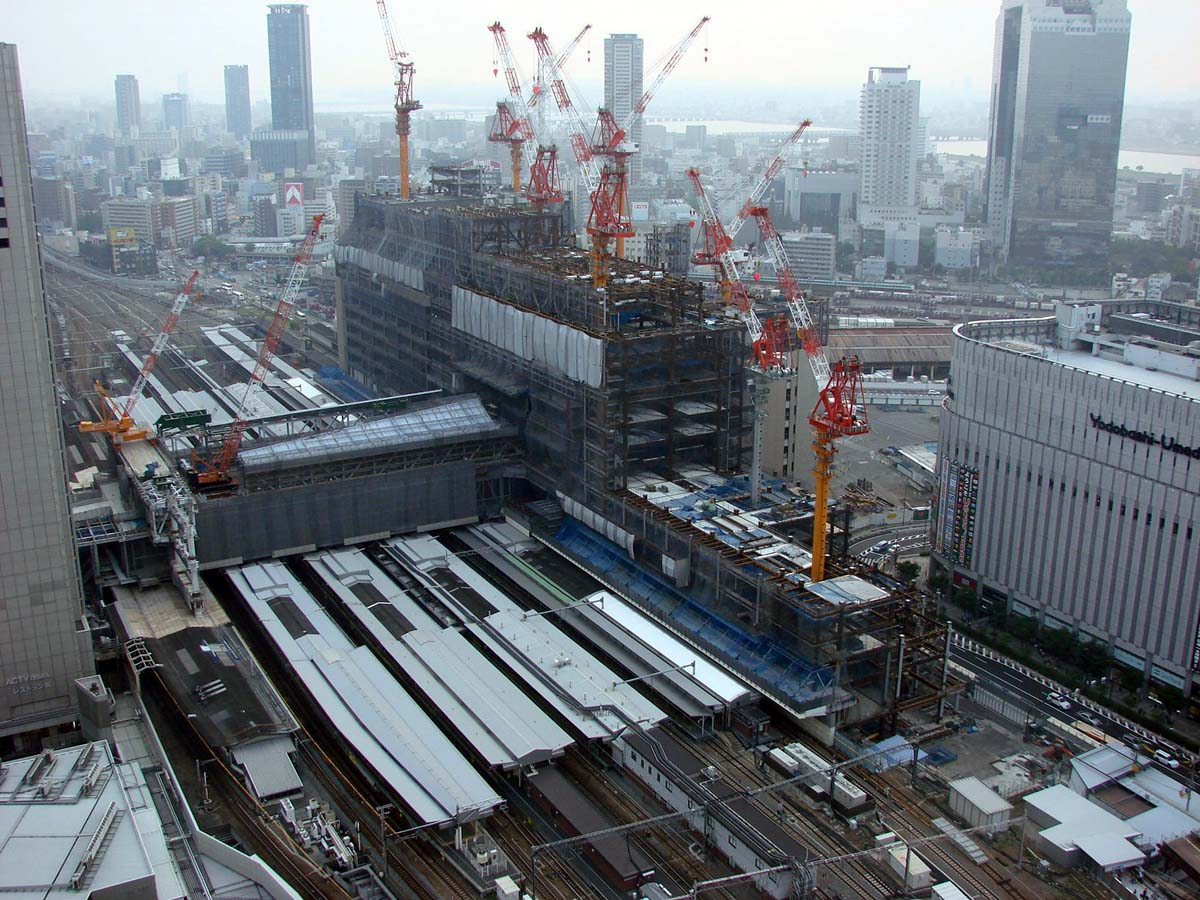
June 2009

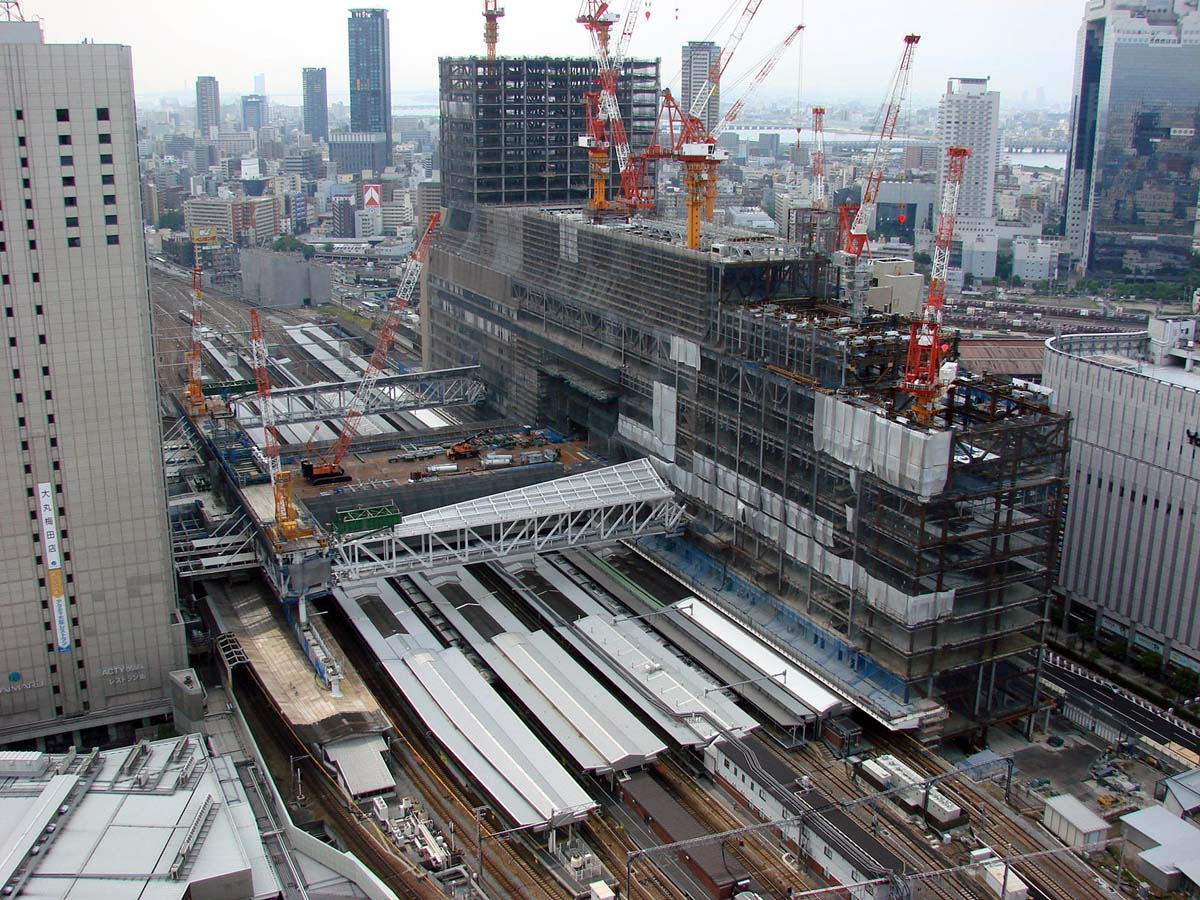
September 2009

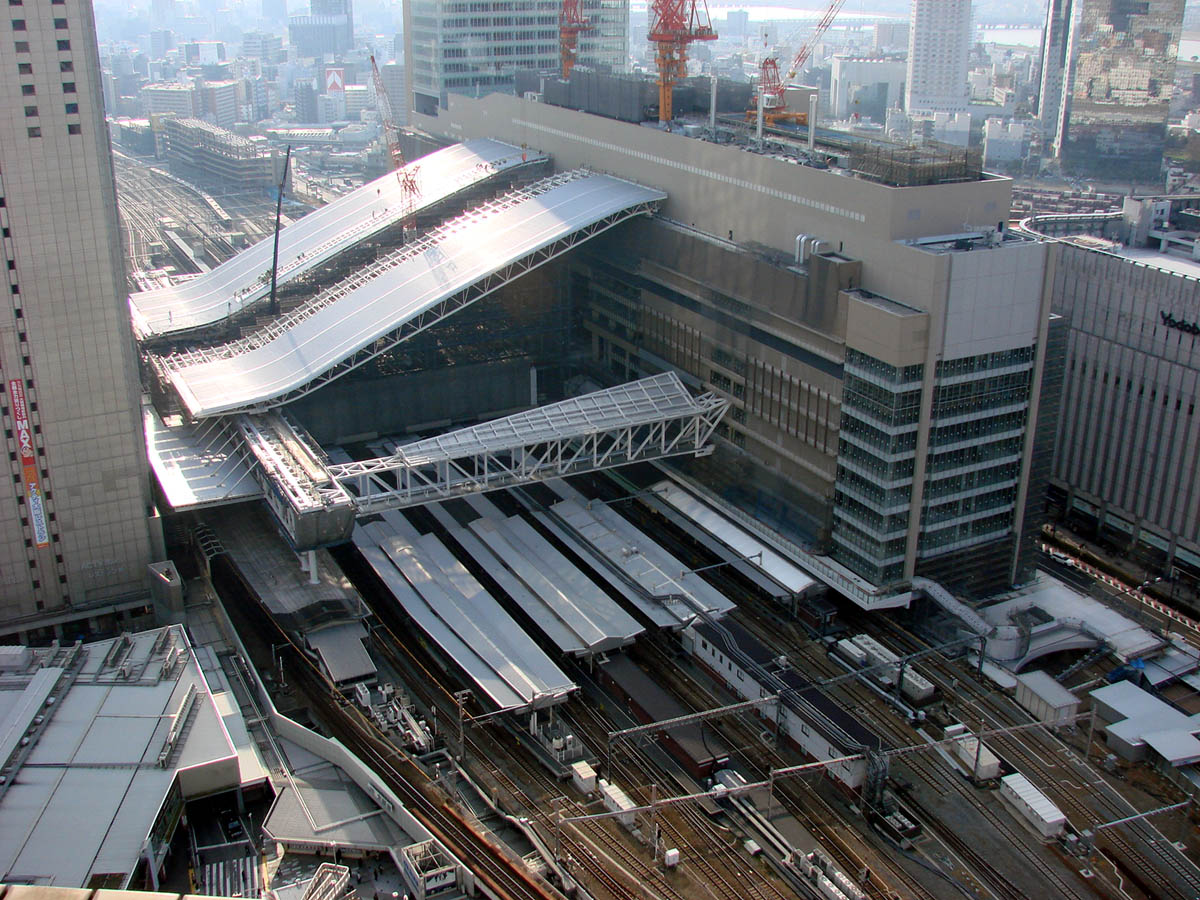
March 2010

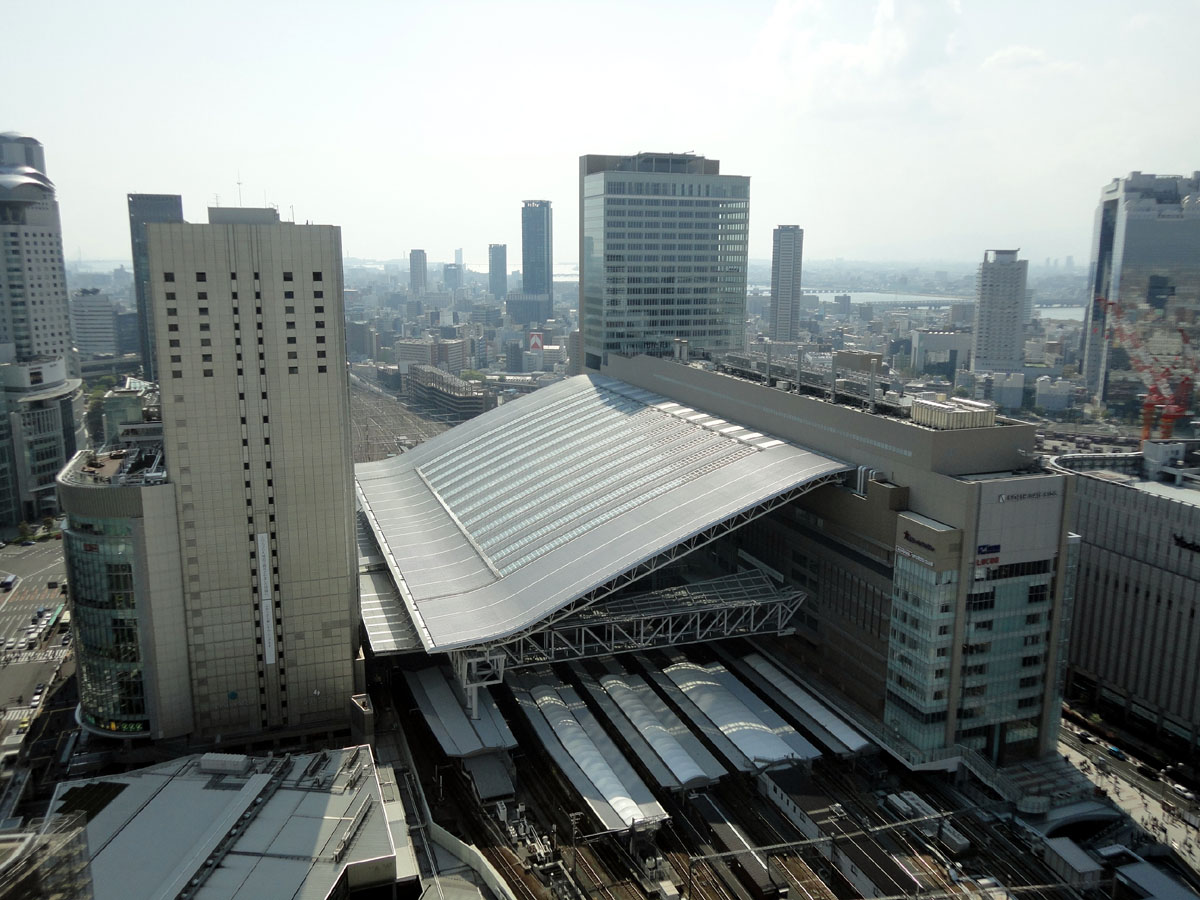
April 2011

=== Future expansion ===
A new line called the Naniwasuji Line is planned to be opened by 2031 and will route trains under the Naniwasuji corridor to JR Namba Station and further south. To prepare for the opening of the line, an additional two underground platforms serving four tracks opened for service on the northwest side of the station on 18 March 2023. The next phase of the Naniwasuji Line is to construct the underground tracks south to JR Namba Station and the Nankai Main Line.

== Surrounding area ==
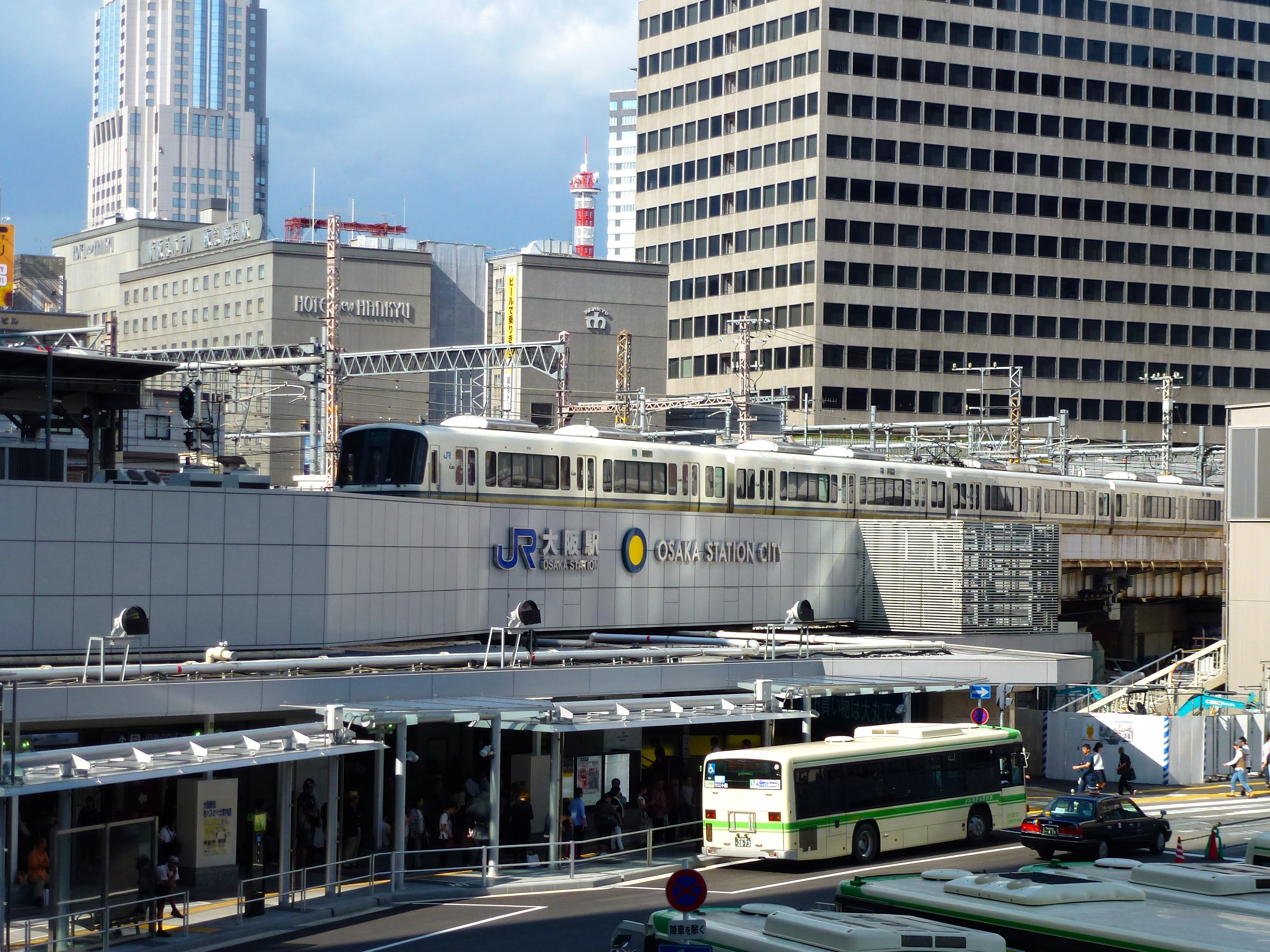
Exterior of Osaka Station

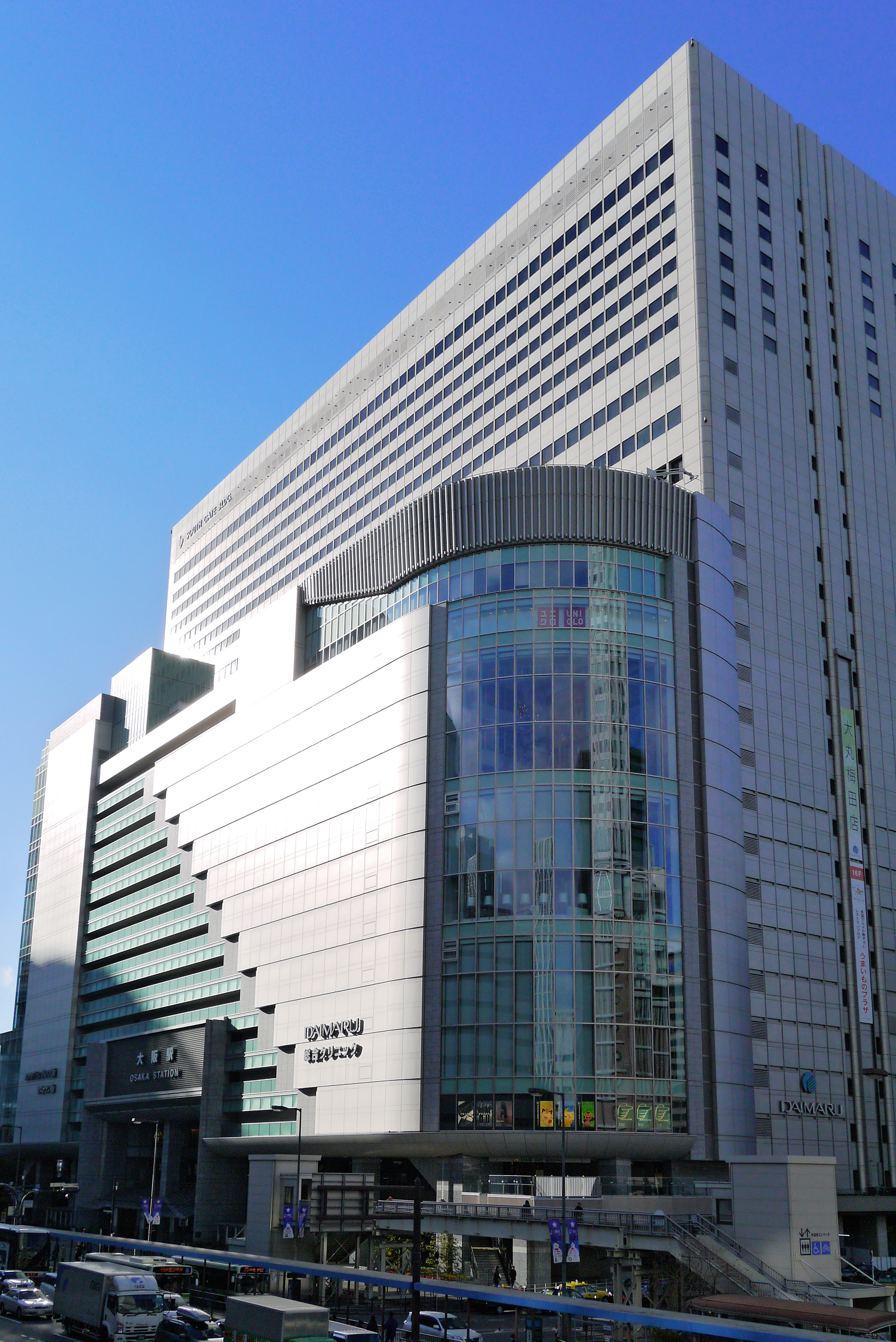
South Gate Building, December 2014

- Osaka Station City
  - South Gate Building
    - Daimaru Umeda
    - Pokémon Center Osaka
    - Nintendo Osaka
    - Hands
    - Hotel Granvia Osaka
  - North Gate Building
    - Lucua (shopping mall)
    - Lucua 1100 (shopping mall, successor of Osaka Mitsukoshi-Isetan Department Store)
    - Osaka Station City Cinema
    - Itochu
    - JR Expressway bus terminal
  - eki marche (restaurants and fashion stores)
  - ALBi (outdoor shops and fashion stores)
  - Umesan-koji (restaurants)

=== North side ===
- Hankyu bus stop (for Kashima-ekimae and Nishikawa via Oyodo-minami Itchome and Juso)
- Hankyu San-bangai
  - San-bangai Expressway bus terminal
- Hotel New Hankyu Osaka
  - Airport shuttle bus terminal for Kansai International Airport and Osaka International Airport
- Grand Front Osaka
  - InterContinental Osaka
- Yodobashi Camera
  - Links Umeda
  - Hotel Hankyu Respire Osaka
- Shin Umeda City
  - Umeda Sky Building
  - The Westin Osaka
- Chayamachi district
  - NU Chayamachi
  - Mainichi Broadcasting System
  - Umeda Arts Theater
  - Loft
  - Umekita Gardens

=== South side ===
- Osaka city bus terminal (Osaka-ekimae)
- Hankyu Department Store, Hanshin Department Store (Both owned by Hankyu Hanshin Department Stores, Inc.)
  - Hankyu bus stop (for Hinodecho (Hankyu Bus Co.), Kozushima, Hankyu Sonoda and Toyonaka via Juso)
- Umeda DT Tower
- Osaka Ekimae Buildings
  - Osaka Central Post Office (in Osaka Ekimae Dai-Ichi Building)
- Osaka Marubiru Building
  - Airport shuttle bus terminal for Osaka International Airport
- Hilton Osaka (Plaza East)
- Osaka Garden City
  - Hilton Osaka (Plaza West)
  - Ritz-Carlton Osaka
  - Herbis Osaka
    - Airport shuttle bus for Kansai International Airport and Osaka International Airport
  - Herbis Ent
    - Osaka Shiki Theatre
    - Billboard live Osaka
  - Mainichi Shimbun
- HEP Five

== See also ==
- Umeda Station
- Transport in Keihanshin
