= Konohana-ku =

Ward of Osaka, Japan

Coordinates: 34°40′59″N 135°27′8″E

Location of Konohana-ku in Osaka City

Konohana-ku (此花区) is one of 24 wards of Osaka city, Japan. It stands at the mouth of the Yodo River. It is home to the popular western-style theme park of Universal Studios Japan. It was the site of Expo 2025, a World's Fair held in 2025.

== Notable people from Konohana-ku, Osaka ==
- Miyavi, Japanese/Zainichi Korean guitarist, singer-songwriter, record producer and actor (Real Name: Takamasa Ishihara, Nihongo: 石原 崇雅, Ishihara Takamasa)
- Masaru Hamaguchi (Nihongo: 濱口 優), Japanese comedian and member of Japanese comic duo Yoiko
- Ryohei Odai (Nihongo: 小田井 涼平), Japanese actor and voice actor (Gundam Seed and Kamen Rider Ryuki)
- You Yokoyama (Nihongo: 横山 裕), Japanese idol, singer, actor, scriptwriter, radio host, lyricist and member of Kanjani Eight
- Yuko Nasaka (Nihongo: 名坂有子), Japanese avant-garde artist
- Kasumi Saeki (Nihongo: 佐伯 霞), Japanese professional boxer and former WBO mini flyweight world champion

== Transportation ==
=== Trains ===
West Japan Railway Company (JR West)

- Osaka Loop Line: Nishikujō Station
- Sakurajima Line: Nishikujō Station - Ajikawaguchi Station - Universal City Station - Sakurajima Station

Hanshin Electric Railway

- Hanshin Namba Line: Nishikujō Station - Chidoribashi Station - Dempō Station

Osaka Metro

- Chūō Line: Yumeshima Station
