= Sakurajima Line =

Railway line in Osaka, Japan

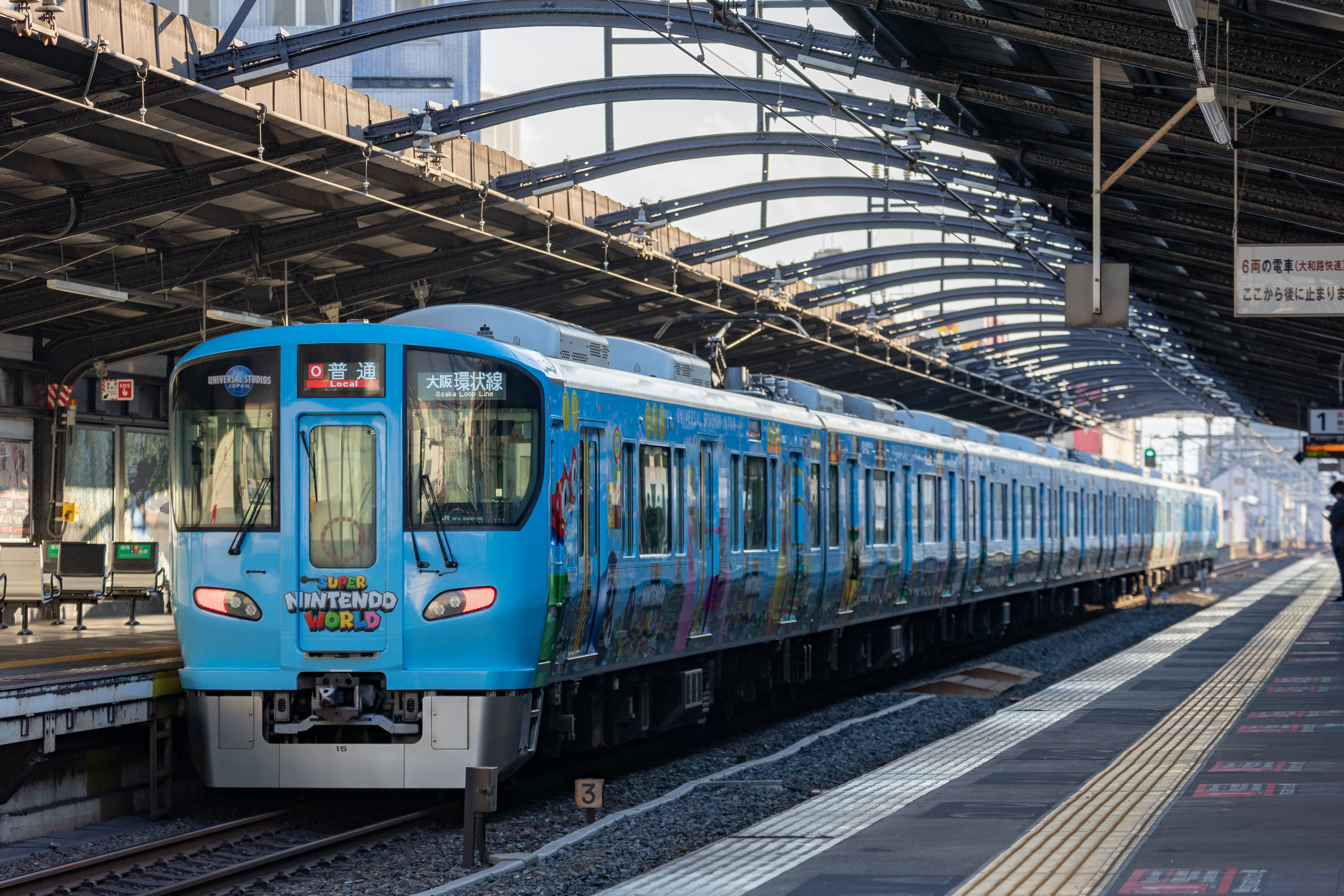
- A 323 series train on the Sakurajima Line

Overview
- Other name: JR Yumesaki Line
- Status: Operating
- Owner: JR West
- Locale: Konohana-ku, Osaka
- Termini: Nishikujō; Sakurajima
- Stations: 4

Service
- Type: Heavy rail
- Operator(s): JR West, JR Freight
- Rolling stock: 323 series

History
- Opened: April 5, 1898; 127 years ago (first section); April 25, 1961; 64 years ago (current form)

Technical
- Track length: 4.1 km (2.5 mi)
- Number of tracks: Double-track (Universal City-Sakurajima); Twin single-track (Nishikujo-Universal City)
- Track gauge: 1,067 mm (3 ft 6 in)
- Electrification: 1,500 V DC (Overhead line)
- Operating speed: 95 km/h (59 mph)
- Train protection system: ATS-P

The Sakurajima Line (桜島線, Sakurajima-sen) is a railway line in Osaka, Japan, operated by West Japan Railway Company (JR West) connecting Nishikujō Station to Sakurajima Station. It is also referred to as the JR Yumesaki Line (JRゆめ咲線). The entire line is within Konohana-ku, Osaka, and connects the Osaka Loop Line to Universal Studios Japan (USJ).

The nickname "Yumesaki Line" was determined in a public poll upon the opening of USJ and the Universal City station. While it was not the first choice, its pleasant sound together with the vision of the area around the Sakurajima Line and USJ being a place where Osaka's dreams were continuing to be born made it the selected choice.

The line is used primarily by a mix of factory workers and tourists. There is also freight traffic operating between Suita and Ajikawaguchi.

== Stations ==
No.	Station	Japanese	Distance (km)	Transfers
JR-P14	Nishikujō	西九条	0.0	Osaka Loop Line (JR-O14); Hanshin: Namba Line (HS 45)
JR-P15	Ajikawaguchi	安治川口	2.4	
JR-P16	Universal City	ユニバーサルシティ	3.2	
JR-P17	Sakurajima	桜島	4.1	

== Service ==
In addition to trains that operate only on the Sakurajima Line itself, there are also direct services from Tennōji, Kyōbashi, and Osaka stations that alternate during non-peak times. Also, during peak travel seasons, seasonal trains (such as the Universal Express limited express service) will run through to/from the Hokuriku Main Line. However, as the number of visitors to USJ has been on the decline in recent years, such special trains are now only rarely operated. In 2025 during the 2025 Expo there will be a temporary Train called the Expo liner from/to Shin Ōsaka and Sakurajima stopping at Ōsaka,Universal City, and Sakurajima. These trains operate once an hour

As a contingency in the event of a service disruption, the line has bi-directional signalling, meaning trains can operate in either direction on either line between Nishikujō and Universal City.

While Universal Express trains make their final stop at Universal City, there are no points for them to change directions at that station. Such trains proceed to Sakurajima and change directions there.

== History ==
Originally the Nishikujō – Sakurajima section was not a separate line, but part of the Nishinari Line, which was operated by the private Nishinari Railway and featured a movable bridge over the Hokkō Canal on the Ajikawaguchi to Sakurajima section. A portion of the Nishinari Line became a part of the Osaka Loop Line when it was completed in 1961, with the rest becoming the Sakurajima Line. The line served as a commuter route for workers in factories along the line as well as for freight, with limited off-peak patronage. This continued until the construction of USJ, which resulted in tourists being the main users of the line.

From the end of operations on the Katsuki Line on April 1, 1985, until the beginning of service on the Miyazaki Kūkō Line on July 18, 1996, the Sakurajima Line was the shortest passenger line among the JR Group companies. (Including freight lines, the shortest at the time was the Shinminato Line in Toyama Prefecture.)

Sakurajima Station was relocated on April 1, 1999, the lift-bridge on the former line being unused since the canal was filled in the 1990s.

When service began at Universal City Station, there were requests by local residents and business owners for a new station ("Haruhinode Station") between Nishikujō and Ajikawaguchi stations. However, not enough demand was forecast and the requests were not met.

=== Chronology ===
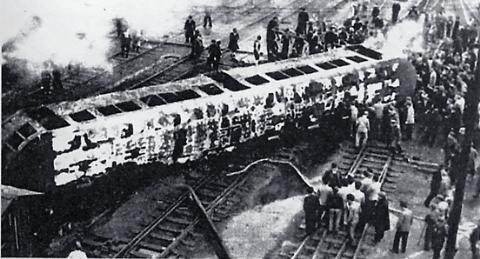
Disaster at Ajikawaguchi, 1940

- April 5, 1898: Nishinari Railway from Osaka to Ajikawaguchi (5.79 km) opens
- December 1, 1904: Leased by Railway Operation Bureau
- April 1, 1905: Ajikawaguchi - Tenpōzan section (1.61 km) opens; leased at same time
- December 1, 1906: Nationalized by JGR
- October 12, 1909: Line named "Nishinari Line" by JGR
- April 15, 1910: Sakurajima Station opens; Sakurajima - Tenpozan section demolished
- May 1, 1934: Gasoline multiple unit (MU) service begins, using KiHa 42000 train cars
- January 29, 1940: Gasoline MU derailment and fire at Ajikawaguchi station kills 189 and injures 69
- May 1, 1941: Osaka - Sakurajima section electrified (1,500 V DC).
- November 21, 1943: Freight branch line established between Ajikawaguchi and Osaka
- April 25, 1961: Osaka Loop Line service begins; Nishi-kujo - Sakurajima section separated and renamed the "Sakurajima Line"
- March 1, 1966: Sakurajima Station relocated 0.5 km east
- November 15, 1982: Freight branch line between Ajikawaguchi and Osaka Hokukō abolished
- April 1, 1987: With the privatization of JNR, Sakurajima Line becomes part of JR West
- April 1, 1999: Ajikawaguchi - Sakurajima section moved to avoid planned USJ theme park; Sakurajima Station moved 0.1 km west
- May 9, 1999: Through operation from Osaka Loop Line stopped due to construction of Universal City Station
- March 1, 2001: Universal City Station opens; Sakurajima Line also referred to as "JR Yumesaki Line" by JR West
- March 3, 2001: Through operation from Osaka Loop Line restarts
- December 16, 2005: 201 series trains enter service
- October 1, 2008: All station platforms become non-smoking; designated smoking areas on platforms are abolished (concourse smoking rooms were removed in October 2003)

== Rolling stock ==
=== Current ===
==== Passenger ====
- 323 series (8-car formation) (since 2016)

One train features USJ wrap advertising for Super Nintendo World (since 2021)

==== Freight ====
- M250 series
- EF210

=== Former ===
- KiHa 42000 (3-car formation) (from 1934 to 1961)
- 101 series (6-car formation) (from 1961 to 1991)
- 103 series (6-and 8-car formation) (from 1969 to 2017)
- 201 series (8-car formation) (from 2005 to 2019)

Because the Sakurajima Line is the main access route for USJ, 103 series and 201 series 8-car trains are decorated with USJ advertisements, although previously 103 series 6-car trains also featured USJ-related wrap advertising.

== Extension plans ==
On September 10, 2009, the then Governor of Osaka Prefecture Tōru Hashimoto announced that he was examining a 4 km extension of the Sakurajima Line from Sakurajima to Trade Center-mae on the Nankō Port Town Line (New Tram). This was to improve access to the World Trade Center (WTC) in Suminoe-ku, to which the governor considered moving the prefectural government offices. Traveling from Osaka Station to the WTC requires at least 30 minutes, and this inconvenience is considered a major obstacle to any move. Although the prefecture is willing to foot at least part of the estimated construction cost of 100 billion yen, there has been no discussion yet of the effect on travel patterns with existing transit agencies/companies.

Of the estimated 4 km length of the extension, approximately 3 km would be underground. Travel times between Osaka and the WTC are expected to drop to 20 minutes if completed.

== See also ==
- List of railway lines in Japan
