= Sakurajima Station =

Railway station in Osaka, Japan

Coordinates: 34°39′42.97″N 135°25′55.8″E

Sakurajima Station 桜島駅
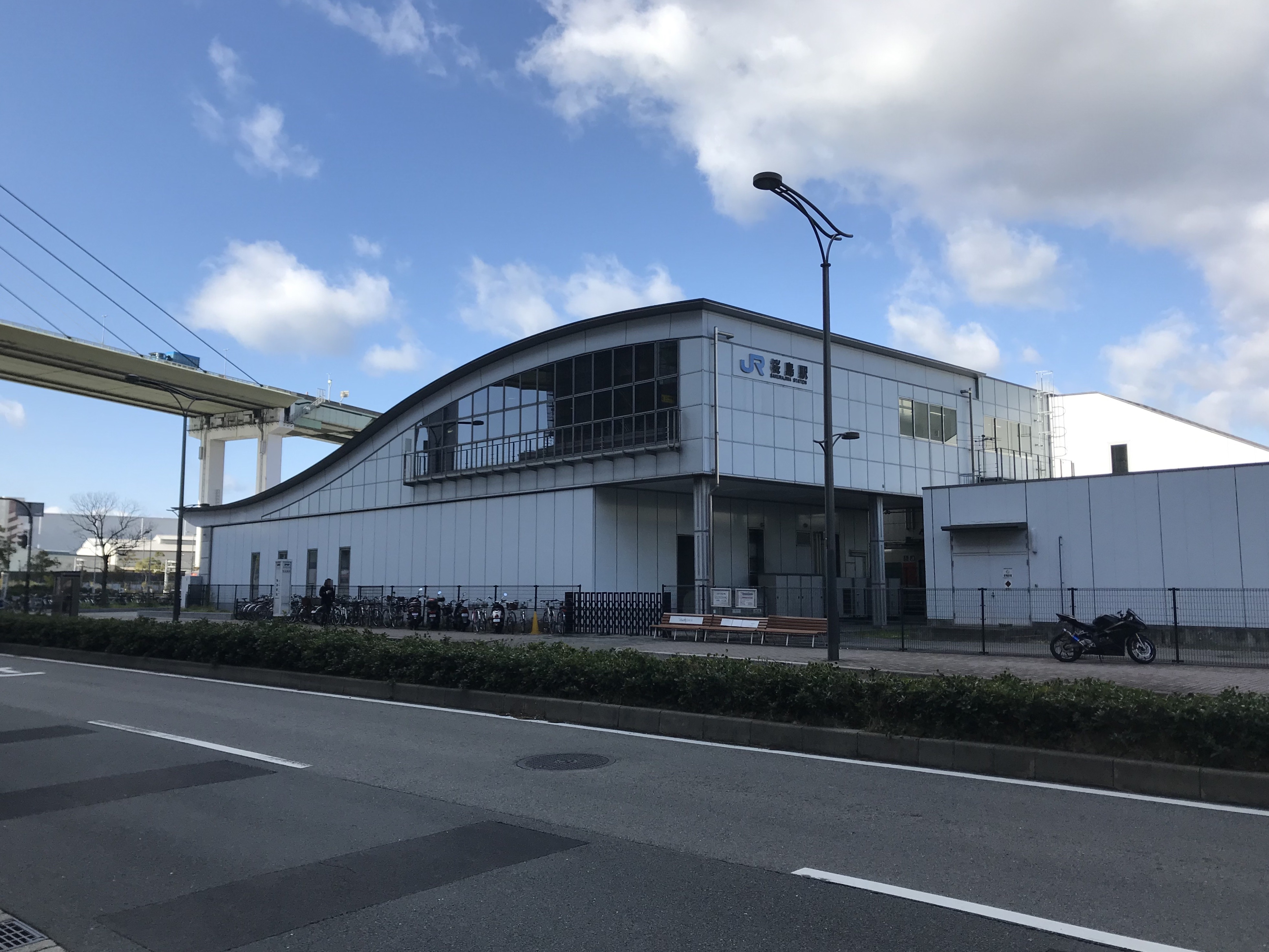
- Station building, 2019

General information
- Location: 1-2-5 Sakurajima, Konohana Ward, Osaka City; Osaka Prefecture; Japan
- Operator: JR West
- Line: P JR Yumesaki Line
- Platforms: 1 island platform
- Tracks: 2

Construction
- Structure type: At grade

Other information
- Station code: JR-P17

History
- Opened: 15 April 1910; 116 years ago

Passengers
- 2020: 9,809 daily

Services
Preceding station	JR West	Following station
Terminus	JR Yumesaki Line	Universal City towards Nishikujō
Location
- Location within Osaka Prefecture Location within Kansai region Location within Japan

Sakurajima Station (桜島駅, Sakurajima-eki) is a train station on the West Japan Railway Company Sakurajima Line (JR Yumesaki Line) in Konohana-ku, Osaka, Osaka Prefecture, Japan. It is the terminus of the line. The station lies at the southwest edge of Universal Studios Japan (and once existed where the park now stands, before the line was rerouted); however, the park can only be accessed from Universal City Station, the next station on the line.

== Layout ==
The station has an island platform serving two tracks.

1, 2	■ JR Yumesaki Line	for Nishikujo and Osaka

== History ==
Station numbering was introduced in March 2018 with Sakurajima being assigned station number JR-P17.
