= Izumigaoka Station =

Railway station in Sakai, Japan

Izumigaoka Station 泉ヶ丘駅
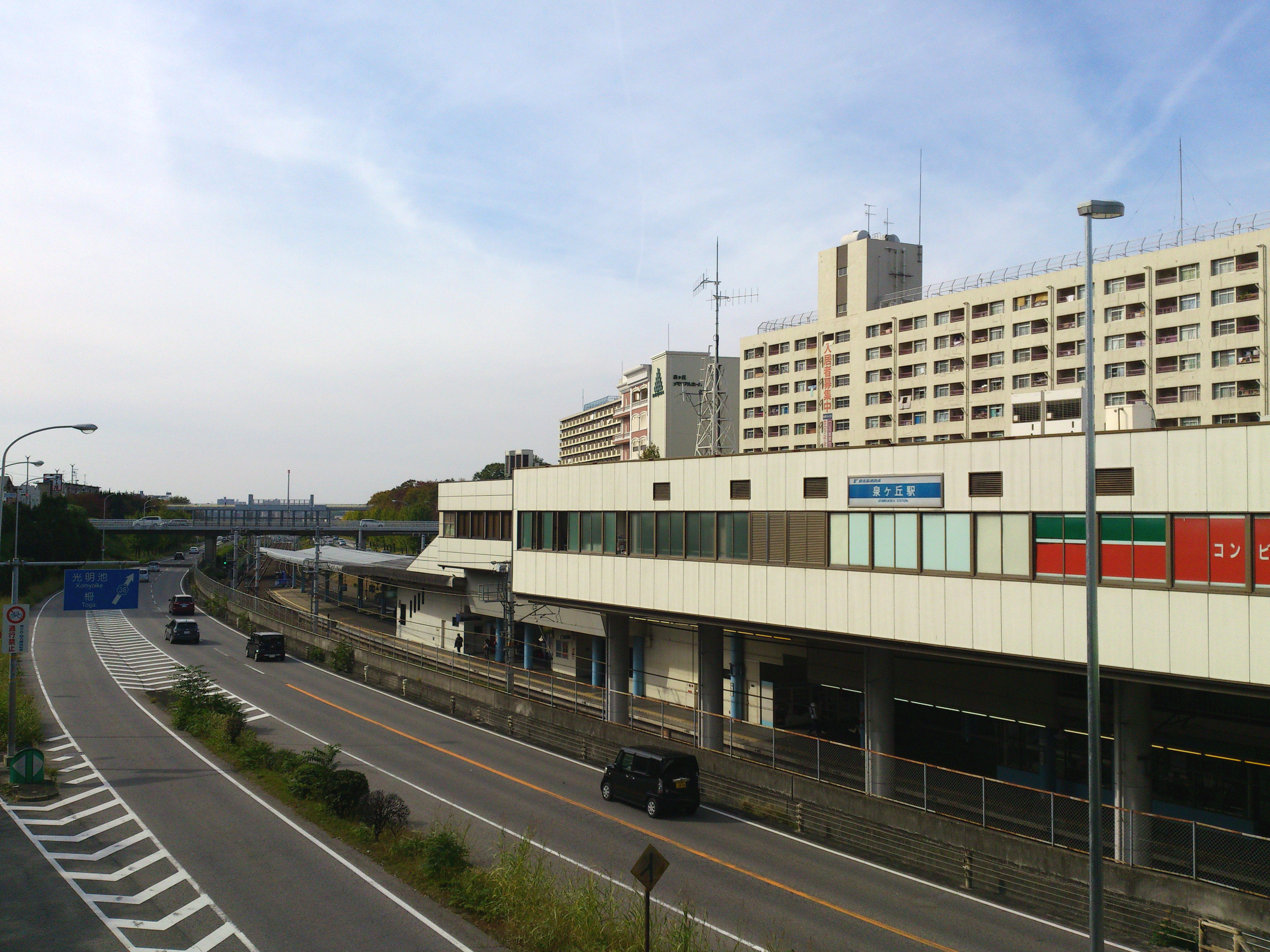
- Izumigaoka Station, November 2012

General information
- Location: 1-1, Takeshirodai 1-chō, Minami-ku, Sakai-shi, Osaka-fu 590-0105; Japan
- Coordinates: 34°29′50″N 135°30′42″E
- Operator: Nankai Electric Railway
- Line: Semboku Line
- Distance: 7.8 km (4.8 miles) from Nakamozu
- Platforms: 1 island platform
- Connections: Bus terminal

Other information
- Status: Staffed
- Station code: NK89
- Website: Official website

History
- Opened: April 1,1971

Passengers
- FY2019: 40,504 daily

Services
Preceding station	Nankai Electric Railway	Following station
Fukai towards Nakamozu	Semboku Line Local	Toga-Mikita towards Izumi-Chūō
Fukai towards Namba	Semboku Line Semi-Express Sub. Express	Toga-Mikita towards Izumi-Chūō
Tengachaya towards Namba	Semboku Liner	Toga-Mikita towards Izumi-Chūō
Location
- Location within Osaka Prefecture Location within Japan

Izumigaoka Station (泉ヶ丘駅, Izumigaoka eki) is a passenger railway station located in Minami-ku, Sakai, Osaka Prefecture, Japan, operated by the Nankai Electric Railway. It is station number NK89.

== Lines ==
Izumigaoka Station is served by the Nankai Semboku Line, and is located 7.8 kilometers from the opposing terminus of the line at Nakamozu and 21.2 kilometers from Namba.

== Station layout ==
The station consists of one elevated island platform with the station building underneath.

=== Platforms ===
1	■ Semboku Line	for Izumi-Chuo
2	■ Semboku Line	for Nakamozu, (Koya Line) Sakaihigashi and Namba

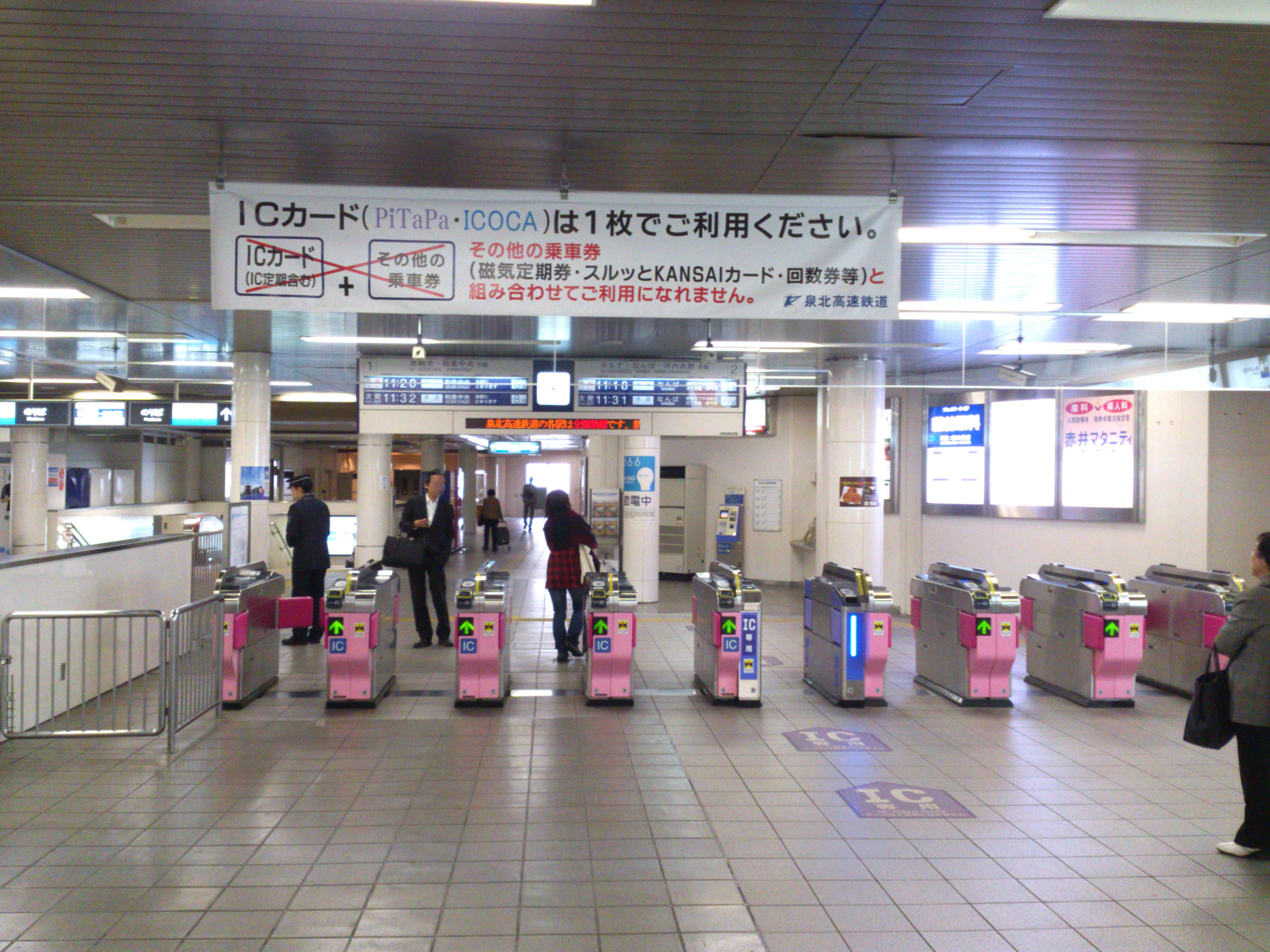
Ticket gates

== History ==
Izumigaoka Station opened on April 1, 1971.

Following the merger of the Semboku Rapid Railway into Nankai Electric Railway on April 1, 2025, Izumigaoka Station's station number was changed to NK89.

== Passenger statistics ==
In fiscal 2019, the station was used by an average of 40,504 passengers daily (boarding passengers only).

== Surrounding area ==
- Senboku New Town residential area
- Sakai City Izumigaoka Civic Center
- Sakai City Minami Library
- Momoyama Gakuin College of Education
- Tezukayama Gakuin University
- Tezukayama Gakuin Izumigaoka Junior and Senior High School
- Osaka Prefectural Semboku High School
- Osaka Prefectural Sakai Higashi High School

== See also ==
- List of railway stations in Japan
