= Osaka 17th district =

Japanese Diet electoral district

Osaka 17th District
- Parliamentary constituency for the Japanese House of Representatives
- Numbered map of Osaka Prefecture single-member districts
- Prefecture: Osaka
- Proportional District: Kinki
- Electorate: 326,570 (as of 1 September 2023)

Current constituency
- Created: 1994
- Seats: 1
- Party: Ishin
- Representative: Nobuyuki Baba
- Created from: Osaka's 5th "medium-sized" district
- Municipalities: Minami-ku, Naka-ku, and Nishi-ku of Sakai City

Ōsaka 17th district (大阪府第17区, Ōsaka-fu daijuunanaku or 大阪17区, Ōsaka-juunanaku) is a single-member electoral district of the House of Representatives, the lower house of the national Diet of Japan. It is located in Sakai City in Osaka Prefecture and comprises the Southern (Minami-ku), Central (Naka-ku) and Western (Nishi-ku) wards of the city. As of 2023, 326,570 eligible voters were registered in the district.

The current representative is Nobuyuki Baba, the leader of the "Japan Innovation Party" (Nippon Ishin no Kai).

Before the electoral reform of the 1990s, the area had been part of the five-member Osaka 5th district.

== List of representatives ==
| Representative | Party | Dates | Notes |
|---|---|---|---|
| Shingo Nishimura | NFP | 1996 – 2000 | |
| Nobuko Okashita | LDP | 2000 – 2003 | |
| Shingo Nishimura | DPJ | 2003 – 2005 | |
| Nobuko Okashita | LDP | 2005 – 2009 | |
| Megumu Tsuji | DPJ | 2009 – 2012 | |
| Nobuyuki Baba | Restoration | 2012 – 2014 | Former member of the Sakai City Council |
| Nobuyuki Baba | Innovation | 2014 – 2016 | Former member of the Sakai City Council |
| Nobuyuki Baba | Ishin | 2016 – | Former member of the Sakai City Council |

== Election results ==
2026
| Party | Candidate | Votes | % | ±% |
|---|---|---|---|---|
| Ishin | Nobuyuki Baba | 78,362 | 49.0 | ▼2.3 |
| LDP | Asami Shigi | 42,715 | 26.7 | ▼2.5 |
| Sanseitō | Kazumi Tōmoto | 20,464 | 12.8 | |
| JCP | Mitsuyoshi Inoue | 18,380 | 11.5 | ▼7.0 |
| Registered electors | | 319,656 | | |
| Turnout | | | 53.44 | ▲2.89 |
| Ishin hold | | | | |

2024
| Party | Candidate | Votes | % | ±% |
|---|---|---|---|---|
| Ishin | Nobuyuki Baba | 82,234 | 52.3 | ▼1.3 |
| LDP | Shōhei Okashita (endorsed by Kōmeitō) | 45,904 | 29.2 | ▼2.6 |
| JCP | Kumiko Sawada | 29,130 | 18.5 | ▲3.9 |
| Registered electors | | 322,755 | | |
| Turnout | | | 50.55 | ▼3.95 |
| Ishin hold | | | | |

2021
| Party | Candidate | Votes | % | ±% |
|---|---|---|---|---|
| Ishin | Nobuyuki Baba | 94,398 | 53.60 | ▲10.07 |
| LDP | Shōhei Okashita (endorsed by Kōmeitō) | 66,943 | 31.83 | ▼7.12 |
| JCP | Mori Ryūsei (endorsed by Social Democratic Party) | 25,660 | 14.57 | ▼2.95 |
| Majority | | 27,455 | 15.59 | |
| Turnout | | | 54.50 | ▲8.88 |
| Ishin hold | | | | |

2017
| Party | Candidate | Votes | % | ±% |
|---|---|---|---|---|
| Ishin | Nobuyuki Baba | 65,427 | 43.53 | ▼0.19 |
| LDP | Shōhei Okashita (elected by PR, endorsed by Kōmeitō) | 58,534 | 38.95 | ▼0.42 |
| JCP | Sachiko Fujimoto | 26,337 | 17.52 | ▲0.61 |
| Majority | | 6,893 | 4.59 | |
| Turnout | | | 45.62 | ▼4.28 |
| Ishin hold | | | | |

2014
| Party | Candidate | Votes | % | ±% |
|---|---|---|---|---|
| Ishin | Nobuyuki Baba | 70,196 | 43.72 | ▼0.50 |
| LDP | Shōhei Okashita (elected by PR, endorsed by Kōmeitō) | 63,219 | 39.37 | |
| JCP | Takayoshi Yoshioka | 27,151 | 16.91 | ▲8.17 |
| Majority | | 6,977 | 4.35 | |
| Turnout | | | 52.66 | ▼6.66 |
| Ishin hold | | | | |

2012
| Party | Candidate | Votes | % | ±% |
|---|---|---|---|---|
| Restoration | Nobuyuki Baba | 81,663 | 44.22 | New |
| LDP | Nobuko Okashita | 52,634 | 28.50 | ▼1.77 |
| Democratic | Satoshi Nishi (endorsed by PNP) | 19,895 | 10.77 | ▼32.34 |
| JCP | Takayoshi Yoshioka | 16,144 | 8.74 | ▼0.83 |
| Tomorrow | Megumu Tsuji (endorsed by NPD) | 14,706 | 7.48 | ▼1.01 |
| Independent | Kusumi Okuda | 2,778 | 1.50 | N/A |
| Majority | | 29,029 | 15.46 | |
| Turnout | | | | |
| Restoration gain from Democratic | | | | |

2009
| Party | Candidate | Votes | % | ±% |
|---|---|---|---|---|
| Democratic | Megumu Tsuji | 92,666 | 43.11 | ▲0.55 |
| LDP | Nobuko Okashita | 65,054 | 30.27 | ▼13.00 |
| New Renaissance | Shingo Nishimura | 36,605 | 17.05 | New |
| JCP | Joji Sakamoto | 20,560 | 9.57 | ▲2.66 |
| Majority | | 27,612 | 12.85 | |
| Turnout | | | | |
| Democratic gain from LDP | | | | |

2005
| Party | Candidate | Votes | % | ±% |
|---|---|---|---|---|
| LDP | Nobuko Okashita | 90,765 | 43.27 | ▲13.11 |
| Democratic | Shingo Nishimura (elected by PR) | 89,279 | 42.56 | ▲2.25 |
| JCP | Minoru Manabe | 29,732 | 14.17 | ▼0.97 |
| Majority | | 1,486 | 0.71 | |
| Turnout | | | | |
| LDP gain from Democratic | | | | |

2003
| Party | Candidate | Votes | % | ±% |
|---|---|---|---|---|
| Democratic | Shingo Nishimura | 69,861 | 40.31 | ▲19.58 |
| LDP | Nobuko Okashita | 52,258 | 30.16 | ▲6.65 |
| JCP | Minoru Manabe | 26,236 | 15.14 | ▼5.59 |
| Independent | Takaaki Hirata | 24,937 | 14.39 | ▼1.47 |
| Majority | | 17,603 | 10.16 | |
| Turnout | | | | |
| Democratic gain from LDP | | | | |

2000
| Party | Candidate | Votes | % | ±% |
|---|---|---|---|---|
| LDP | Nobuko Okashita | 41,781 | 23.51 | ▼0.29 |
| JCP | Minoru Manabe | 36,834 | 20.73 | ▼9.63 |
| Democratic | Motoyuki Odachi | 33,392 | 18.79 | New |
| Liberal | Shingo Nishimura (elected by PR) | 28,345 | 15.95 | ▼26.74 |
| Independent | Takaaki Hirata | 28,184 | 15.86 | New |
| Social Democratic | Ryutaro Nakakita | 9,190 | 5.17 | New |
| Majority | | 4,947 | 2.78 | |
| Turnout | | | | |
| LDP gain from New Frontier | | | | |

1996
| Party | Candidate | Votes | % | ±% |
|---|---|---|---|---|
| New Frontier | Shingo Nishimura | 72,359 | 42.69 | |
| JCP | Sumi Fujita (elected by PR} | 51,454 | 30.36 | |
| LDP | Masahiro Okashita | 40,337 | 23.80 | |
| Liberal League | Kusumi Okuda | 5,329 | 3.14 | |
| Majority | | 20,905 | 12.33 | |
| Turnout | | | | |
