= Fukai Station =

Railway station in Sakai, Japan

Fukai Station 深井駅
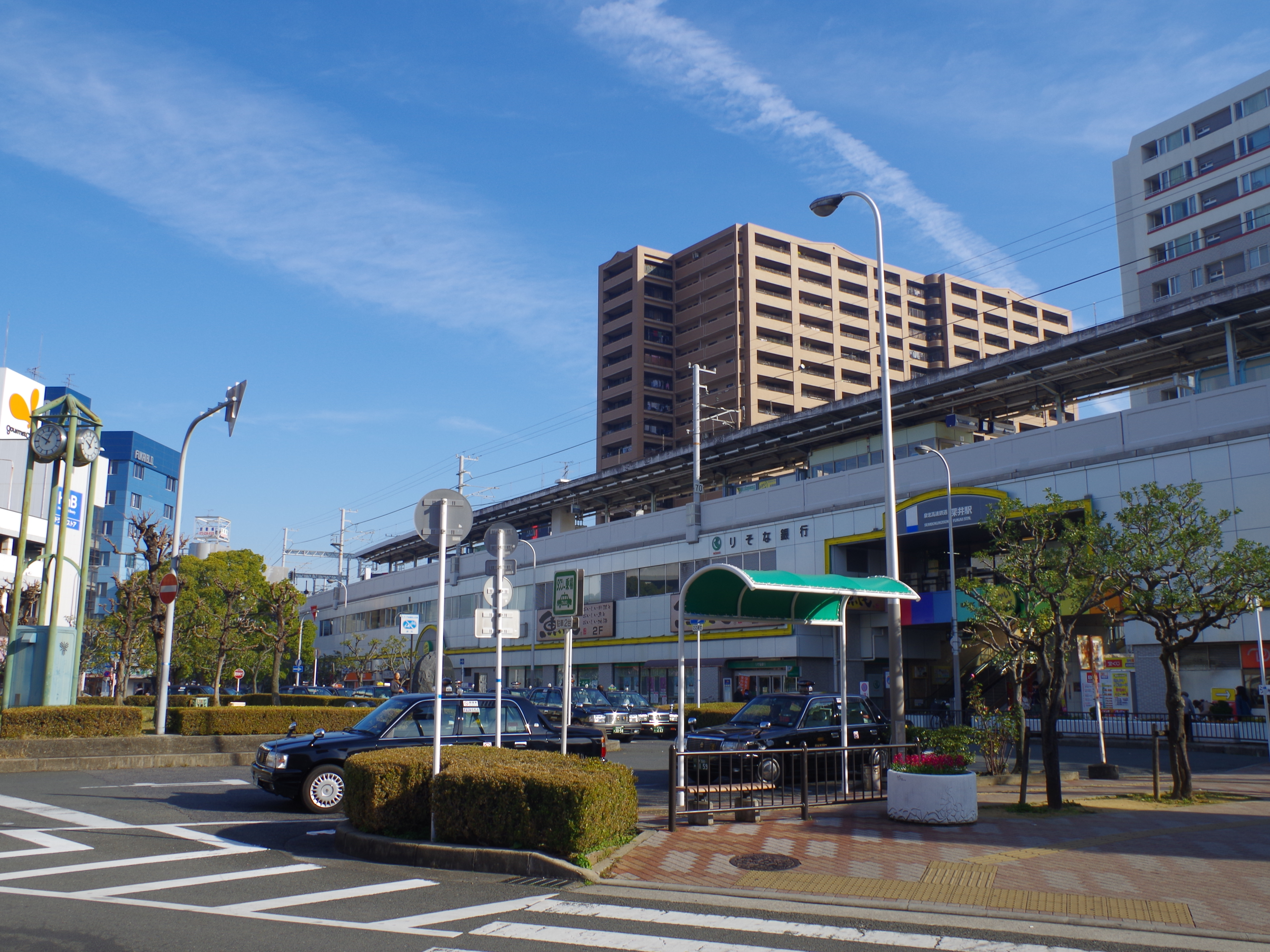
- Fukai Station, December 14, 2012

General information
- Location: 3290, Fukaisawa-machi, Naka-ku, Sakai-shi, Osaka-fu 599-8236; Japan
- Coordinates: 34°31′49″N 135°29′51″E
- Operator: Nankai Electric Railway
- Line: Semboku Line
- Distance: 3.7 km (2.3 miles) from Nakamozu
- Platforms: 1 island platform
- Connections: Bus terminal

Other information
- Status: Staffed
- Station code: NK88
- Website: Official website

History
- Opened: April 1, 1971

Passengers
- FY2019: 26,156 daily

Services
Preceding station	Nankai Electric Railway	Following station
Nakamozu Terminus	Semboku Line Local Semi-Express	Izumigaoka towards Izumi-Chūō
Sakaihigashi towards Namba	Semboku Line Sub. Express	Izumigaoka towards Izumi-Chūō
Location
- Location within Osaka Prefecture Location within Japan

Fukai Station (深井駅, Fukai eki) is a passenger railway station located in Naka-ku, Sakai, Osaka Prefecture, Japan, operated by the Nankai Electric Railway. It is station number NK88.

== Lines ==
Fukai Station is served by the Nankai Semboku Line, and is located 3.7 kilometers from the opposing terminus of the line at Nakamozu and 17.1 kilometers from Nanba.

== Station layout ==
The station consists of one elevated island platform with the station building underneath.

=== Platforms ===
1	■ Semboku Line	for Izumi-Chūō
2	■ Semboku Line	for Nakamozu, (Koya Line) Sakaihigashi and Namba

== History ==
Fukai Station opened on April 1, 1971.

Following the merger of the Semboku Rapid Railway into Nankai Electric Railway on April 1, 2025, Fukai Station's station number was changed from SB02 to NK88.

== Passenger statistics ==
In fiscal 2019, the station was used by an average of 26,156 passengers daily (boarding passengers only).

== Surrounding area ==
- Sakai City Naka Ward Office
- Sakai City Peace and Human Rights Museum (Phoenix Museum)
- Osaka Prefectural Higashi Mozu High School

== See also ==
- List of railway stations in Japan
