= Semboku Liner =

Japanese limited express train service

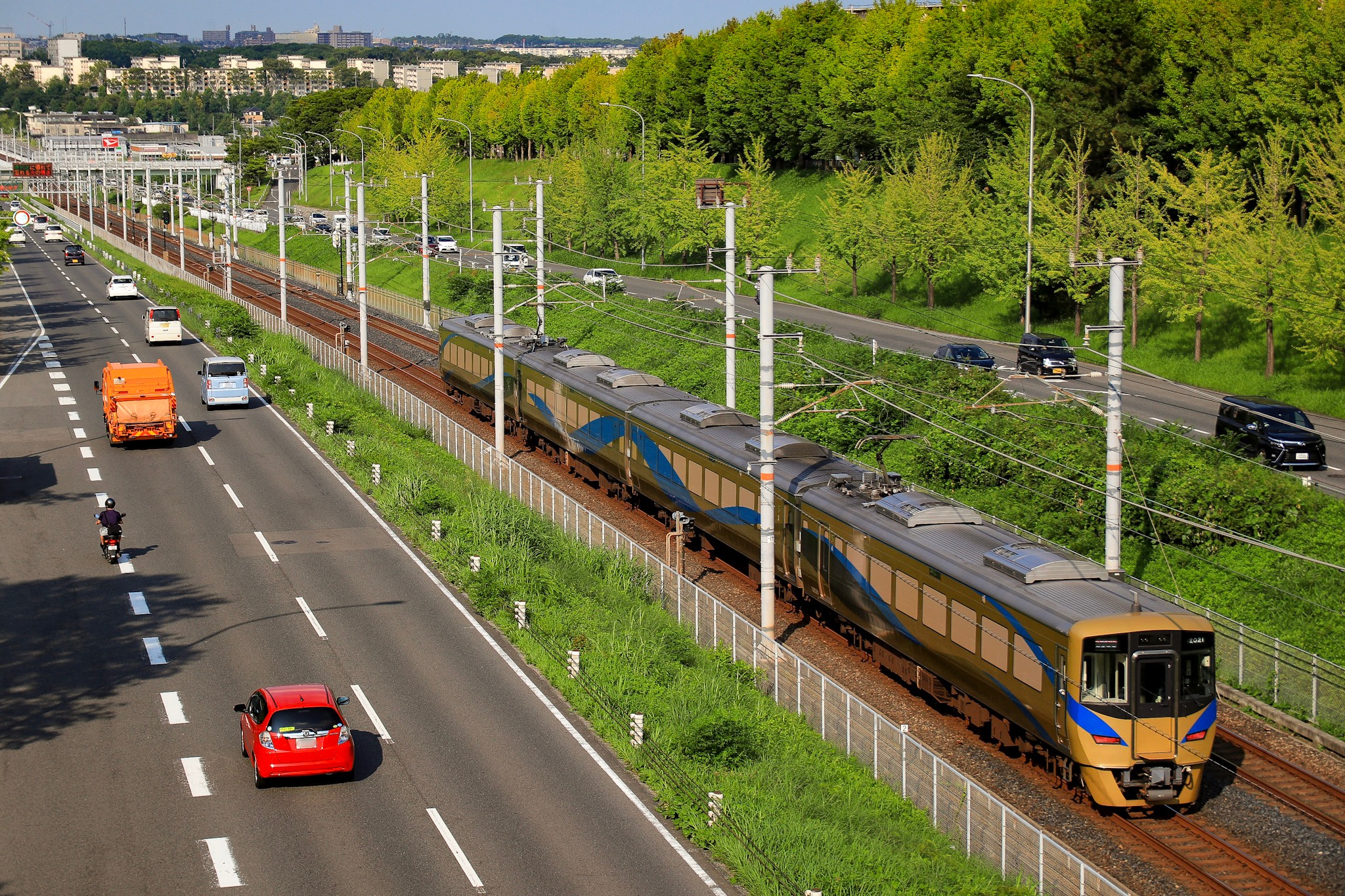
- Semboku 12000 series on a Semboku Liner service, July 2019

Overview
- Service type: Limited express
- Status: Operational
- Locale: Osaka Prefecture, Japan
- First service: 5 December 2015
- Current operator(s): Nankai Electric Railway
- Former operator(s): Semboku Rapid Railway

Route
- Termini: Namba; Izumi-Chūō
- Stops: 7
- Service frequency: 12 inbound, 11 outbound (weekdays); 12 return workings (weekends and holidays)
- Line(s) used: Kōya Line; Semboku Line

Technical
- Rolling stock: Nankai 11000 series EMU; Semboku 12000 series EMU

The Semboku Liner (Japanese: 泉北ライナー, romanized: Senboku Rainā) is a limited express train service operated by the private railway operator Nankai Electric Railway between Izumi-Chūō and Namba stations in Osaka Prefecture, Japan.

== Service pattern ==
The Semboku Liner operates over the Nankai Kōya and Semboku lines between Izumi-Chūō and Namba stations, with intermediate stops at Kōmyōike, Toga-Mikita, Izumigaoka, Tengachaya, and Shin-Imamiya. The journey takes approximately 29 minutes. As of 26 August 2017, 12 inbound services and 11 outbound services are operated on weekdays, and 12 return trips are operated on weekends and holidays.

== History ==
The Semboku Liner made its operational debut on 5 December 2015, coinciding with a revised timetable for the Nankai Kōya Line and the Semboku Rapid Railway Line. Originally, 7 inbound services and 6 outbound services were operated on weekdays, and 8 return services were operated on weekends and holidays. Additional workings were added with the start of the 26 August 2017 timetable revision.

== Rolling stock ==
The Semboku Liner is normally operated using Nankai 11000 series and Semboku 12000 series sets. The Nankai 11000 series, originally developed for use on Rinkan limited express services, was the first train type used on the Semboku Liner. A dedicated Semboku 12000 series trainset was introduced on 27 January 2017.

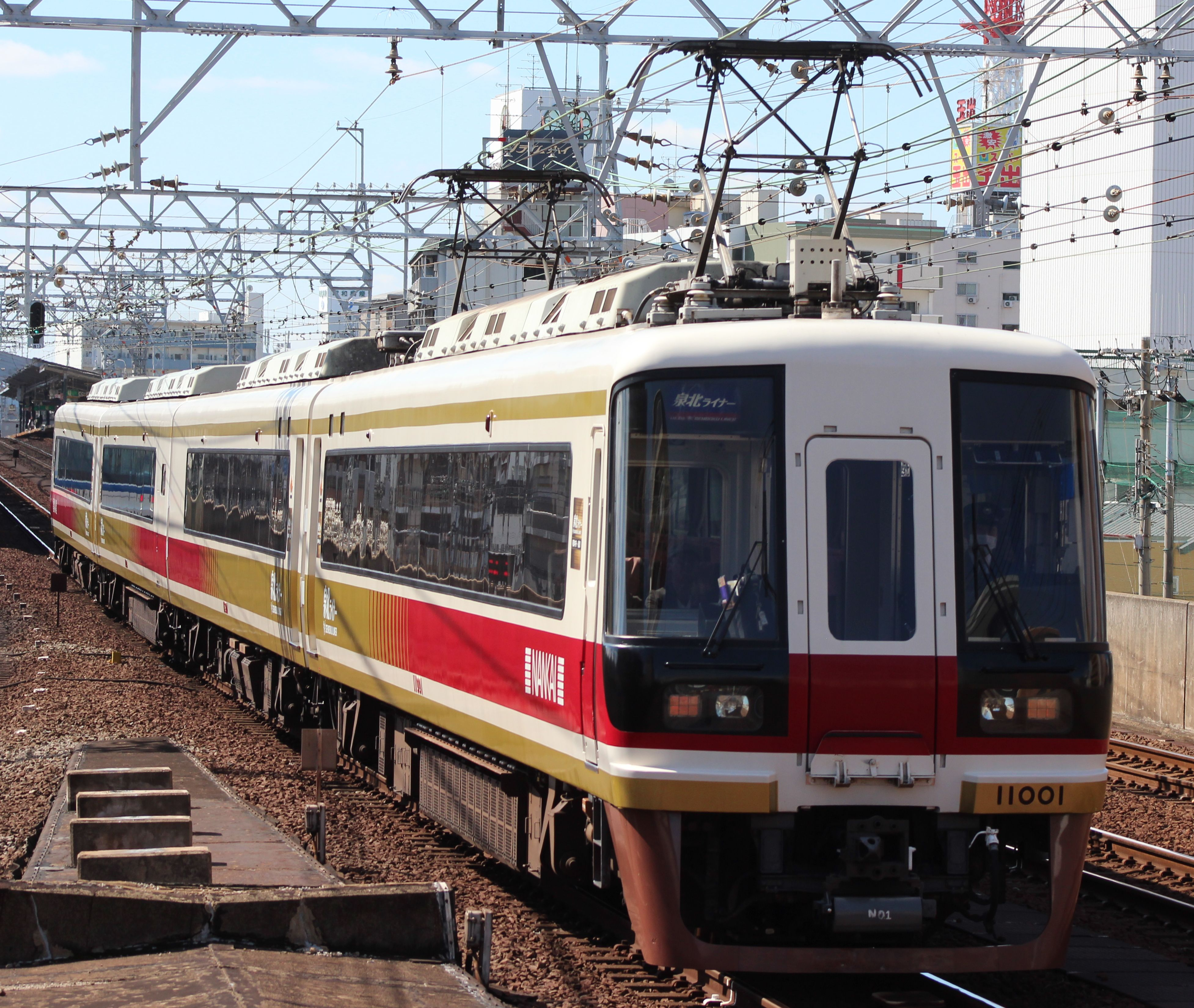
Nankai 11000 series

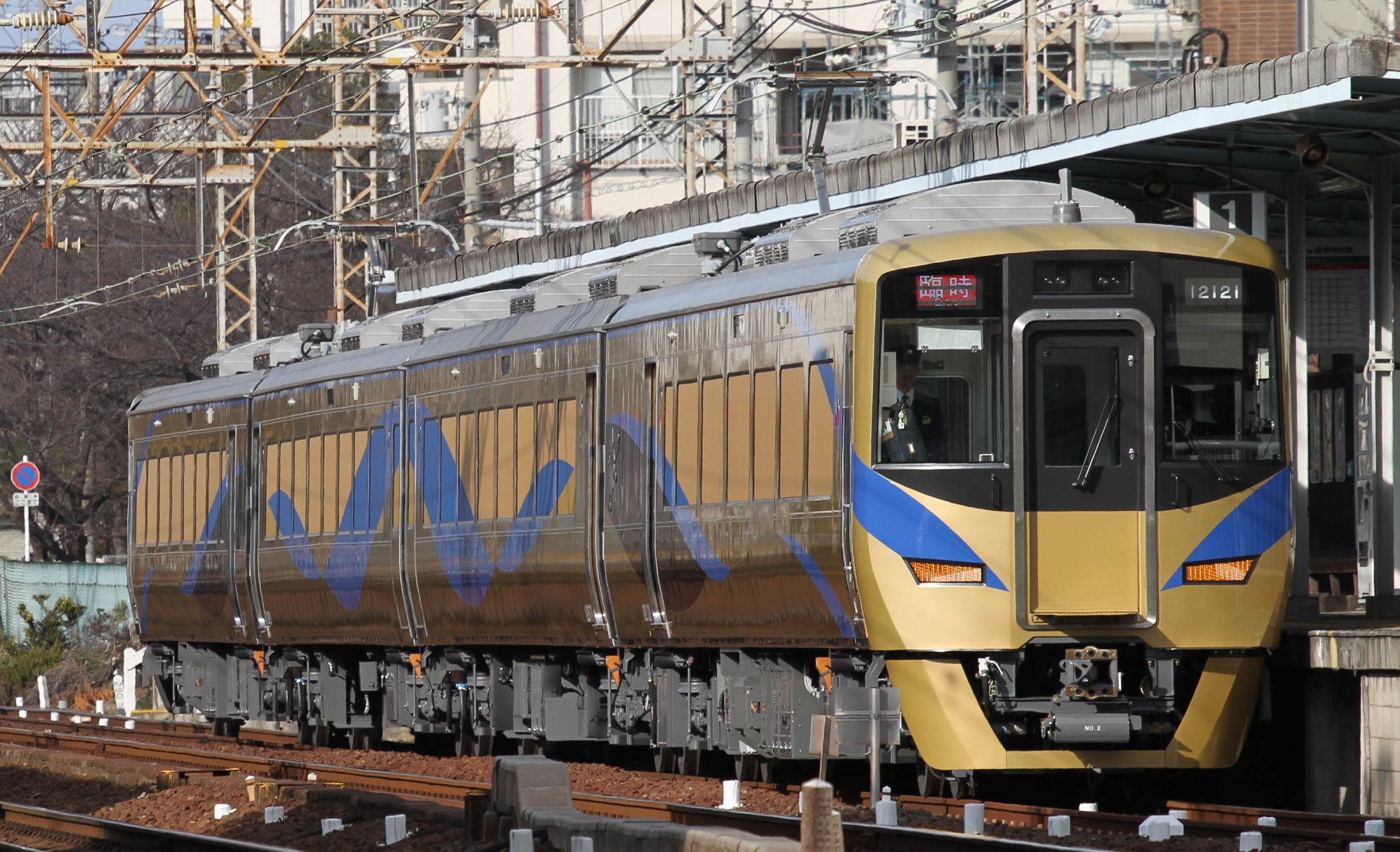
Semboku 12000 series

=== Former ===
- Nankai 50000 series EMU (November 2022 – 2023)
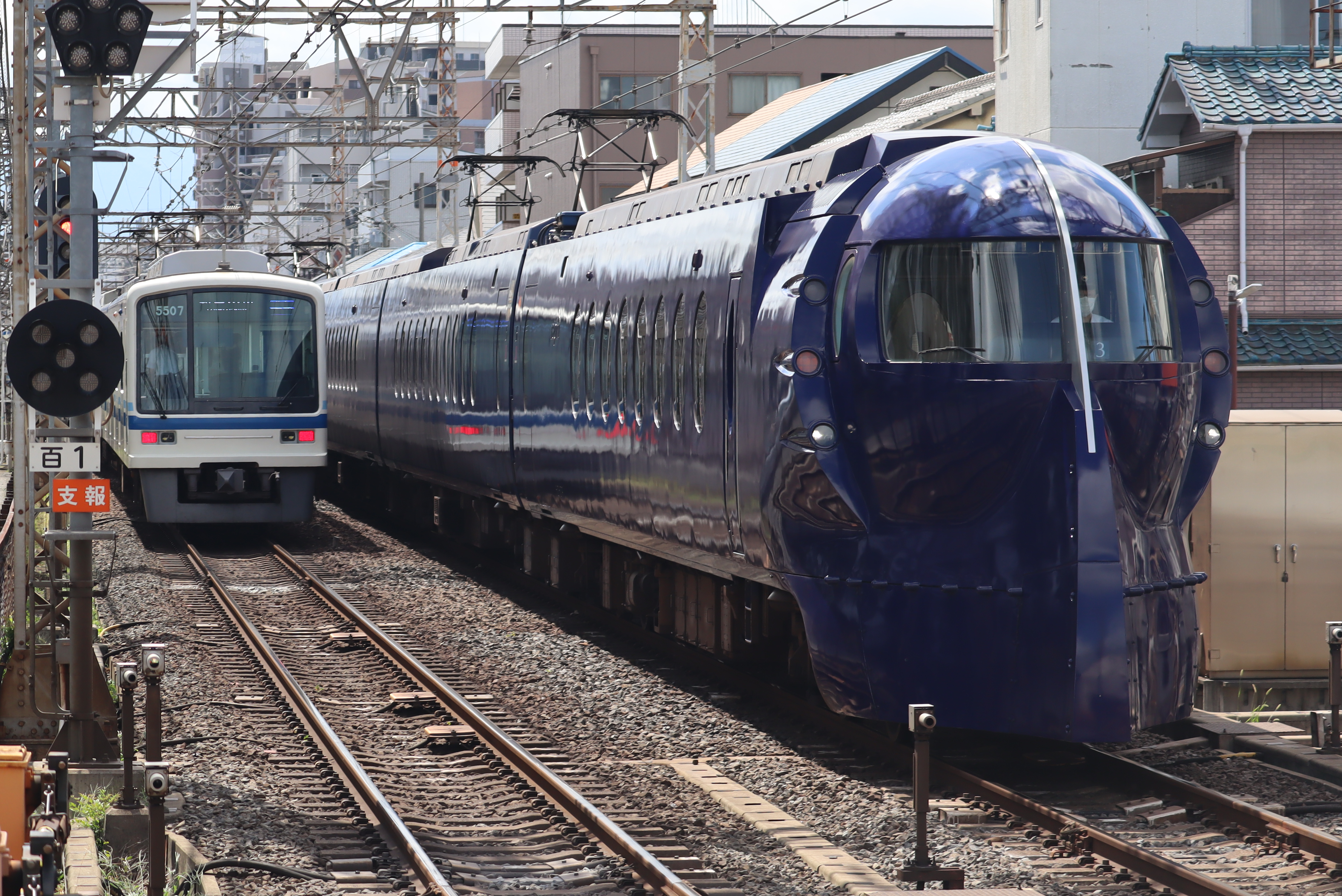
Nankai 50000 series
