= Toga-Mikita Station =

Railway station in Sakai, Japan

Toga-Mikita Station 栂・美木多駅
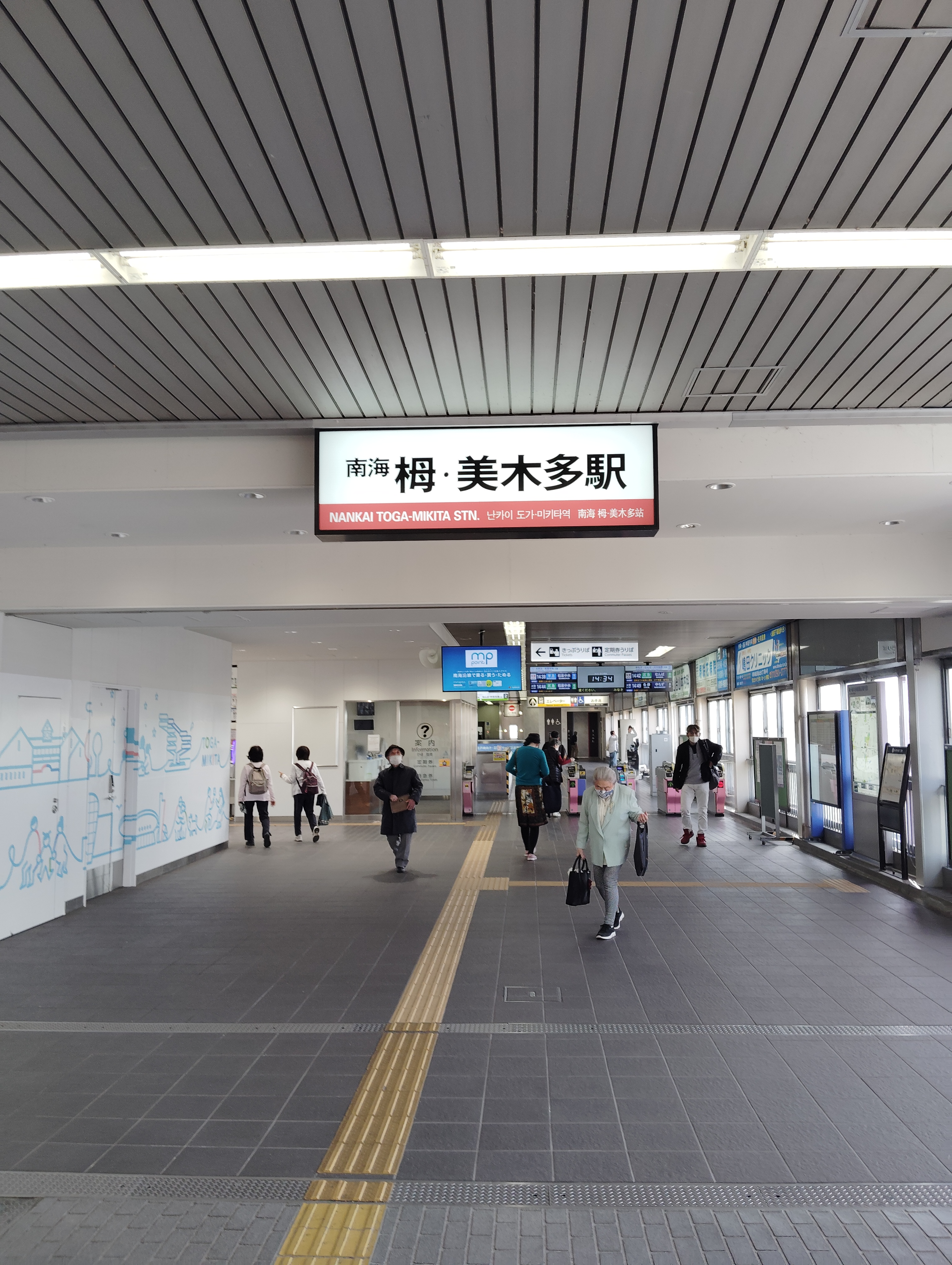
- Toga-Mikita Station in April 2025

General information
- Location: 1-1, Momoyamadai 2-chō, Minami-ku, Sakai-shi, Osaka-fu 590-0141; Japan
- Coordinates: 34°29′06″N 135°29′24″E
- Operator: Nankai Electric Railway
- Line: Semboku Line
- Distance: 10.2 km (6.3 miles) from Nakamozu
- Platforms: 1 island platform
- Connections: Bus terminal

Other information
- Status: Staffed
- Station code: NK90
- Website: Official website

History
- Opened: December 7, 1973

Passengers
- FY2019: 19,582 daily

Services
Preceding station	Nankai Electric Railway	Following station
Izumigaoka towards Nakamozu	Semboku Line Local	Kōmyōike towards Izumi-Chūō
Izumigaoka towards Namba	Semboku Line Semi-Express Sub. Express	Kōmyōike towards Izumi-Chūō
Izumigaoka towards Namba	Semboku Liner	Kōmyōike towards Izumi-Chūō
Location
- Location within Osaka Prefecture Location within Japan

Toga-Mikita Station (栂・美木多駅, Toga-Mikita eki) is a passenger railway station located in Minami-ku, Sakai, Osaka Prefecture, Japan, operated by Nankai Electric Railway. It is station number NK90.

== Lines ==
Toga-Mikita Station is served by the Semboku Line, and is located 10.2 kilometers from the opposing terminus of the line at Nakamozu and 25.5 kilometers from Namba.

== Station layout ==
The station consists of one elevated island platform with the station building underneath.

=== Platforms ===
1	■ Semboku Line	for Izumi-Chuo
2	■ Semboku Line	for Nakamozu, (Koya Line) Sakaihigashi and Namba

== History ==
Toga-Mikita Station opened on December 7, 1973.

On April 1, 2025, this station came under the aegis of Nankai Electric Railway as the result of the buyout of the Semboku Rapid Railway.

== Passenger statistics ==
In fiscal 2019, the station was used by an average of 19,582 passengers daily (boarding passengers only).

== Surrounding area ==
- Sakai City Minami Ward Office
- Nishihara Park
- Osaka Prefectural Sakai Nishi High School
- Osaka Prefectural Fukuizumi High School

== See also ==
- List of railway stations in Japan
