= Kōmyōike Station =

Railway station in Sakai, Japan

Kōmyōike Station 光明池駅
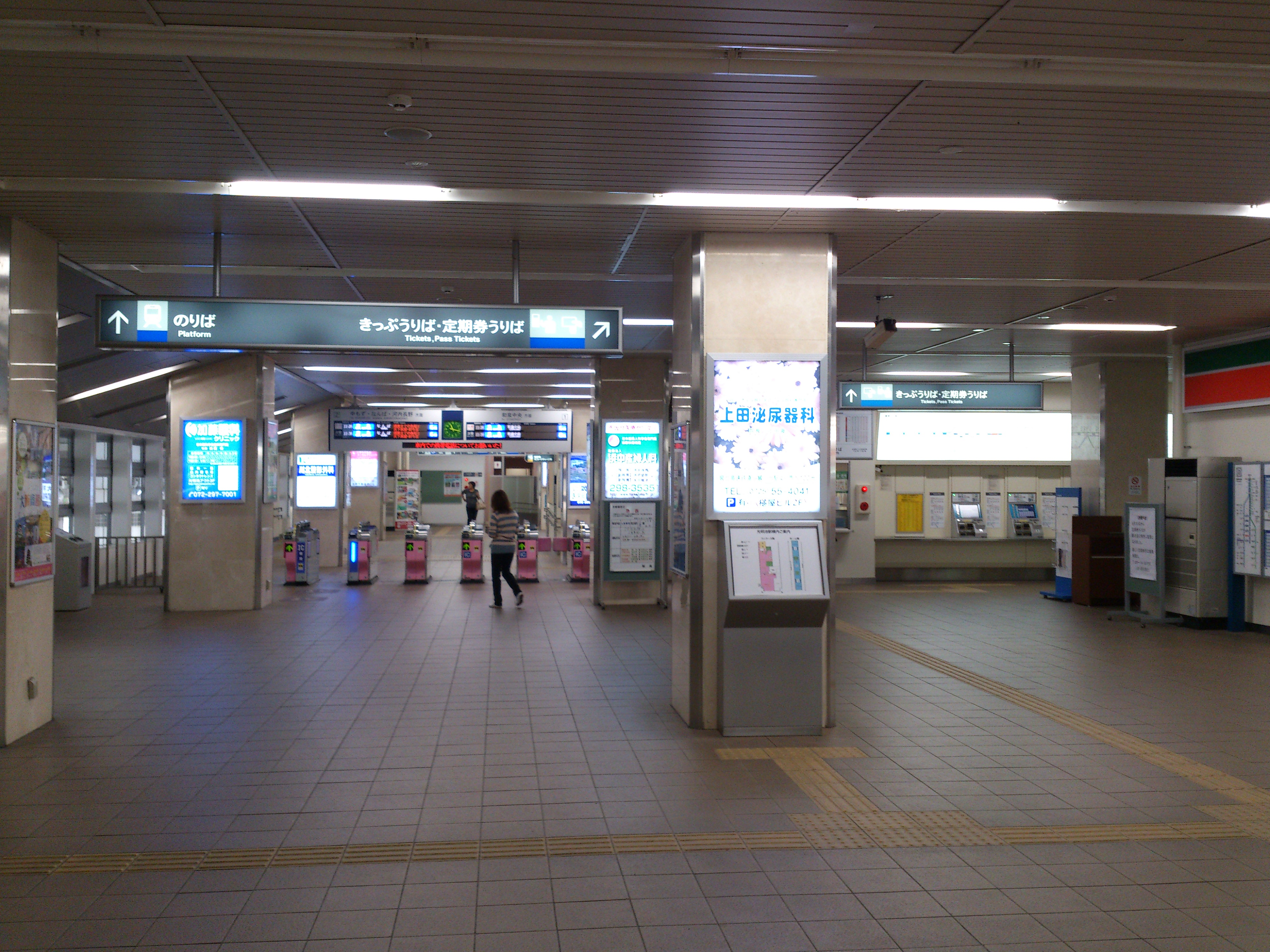
- Ticket gates

General information
- Location: 1-1, Shinhinoodai 2-chō, Minami-ku, Sakai-shi, Osaka-fu 590-0143; Japan
- Coordinates: 34°28′29″N 135°28′32″E
- Operator: Nankai Electric Railway
- Line: Semboku Line
- Distance: 12.1 km (7.5 miles) from Nakamozu
- Platforms: 1 island platform
- Connections: Bus terminal

Other information
- Status: Staffed
- Station code: NK91
- Website: Official website

History
- Opened: 20 August 1977

Passengers
- FY2019: 30,149 daily

Services
Preceding station	Nankai Electric Railway	Following station
Toga-Mikita towards Nakamozu	Semboku Line Local	Izumi-Chūō Terminus
Toga-Mikita towards Namba	Semboku Line Semi-Express Sub. Express	Izumi-Chūō Terminus
Toga-Mikita towards Namba	Semboku Liner	Izumi-Chūō Terminus
Location
- Location within Osaka Prefecture Location within Japan

Kōmyōike Station (光明池駅, Kōmyōike eki) is a passenger railway station located in Minami-ku, Sakai, Osaka Prefecture, Japan, operated by Nankai Electric Railway. It is station number NK91. It is named for Kōmyōike Pond, an artificial lake that dates from 1936 and is itself named for Empress Kōmyō. A small monument at the lake commemorates the work of the Korean laborers who constructed it.

== Lines ==
Kōmyōike Station is served by the Nankai Semboku Line, and is located 12.1 kilometers from the opposing terminus of the line at Nakamozu and 25.5 kilometers from Namba.

== Station layout ==
The station consists of one elevated island platform with the station building underneath.

=== Platforms ===
1	■ Semboku Line	to Izumi-Chūō
2	■ Semboku Line	for Nakamozu and (■ Koya Line) Namba

== History ==
Kōmyōike Station opened on 20 August 1977.

On 1 April 2025, this station came under the aegis of Nankai Electric Railway as the result of the buyout of the Semboku Rapid Railway.

== Passenger statistics ==
In fiscal 2019, the station was used by an average of 30,149 passengers daily (boarding passengers only).

== Surrounding area ==
- Senboku New Town residential area
- Sakai City Kamotani Gymnasium
- Sakai City South Library Miki Tabunkan
- Sakai City Minami Children's Rehabilitation Center
- Osaka Vocational Ability Development School for Persons with Disabilities

== See also ==
- List of railway stations in Japan
