= Semboku 7000 series =

Japanese train type

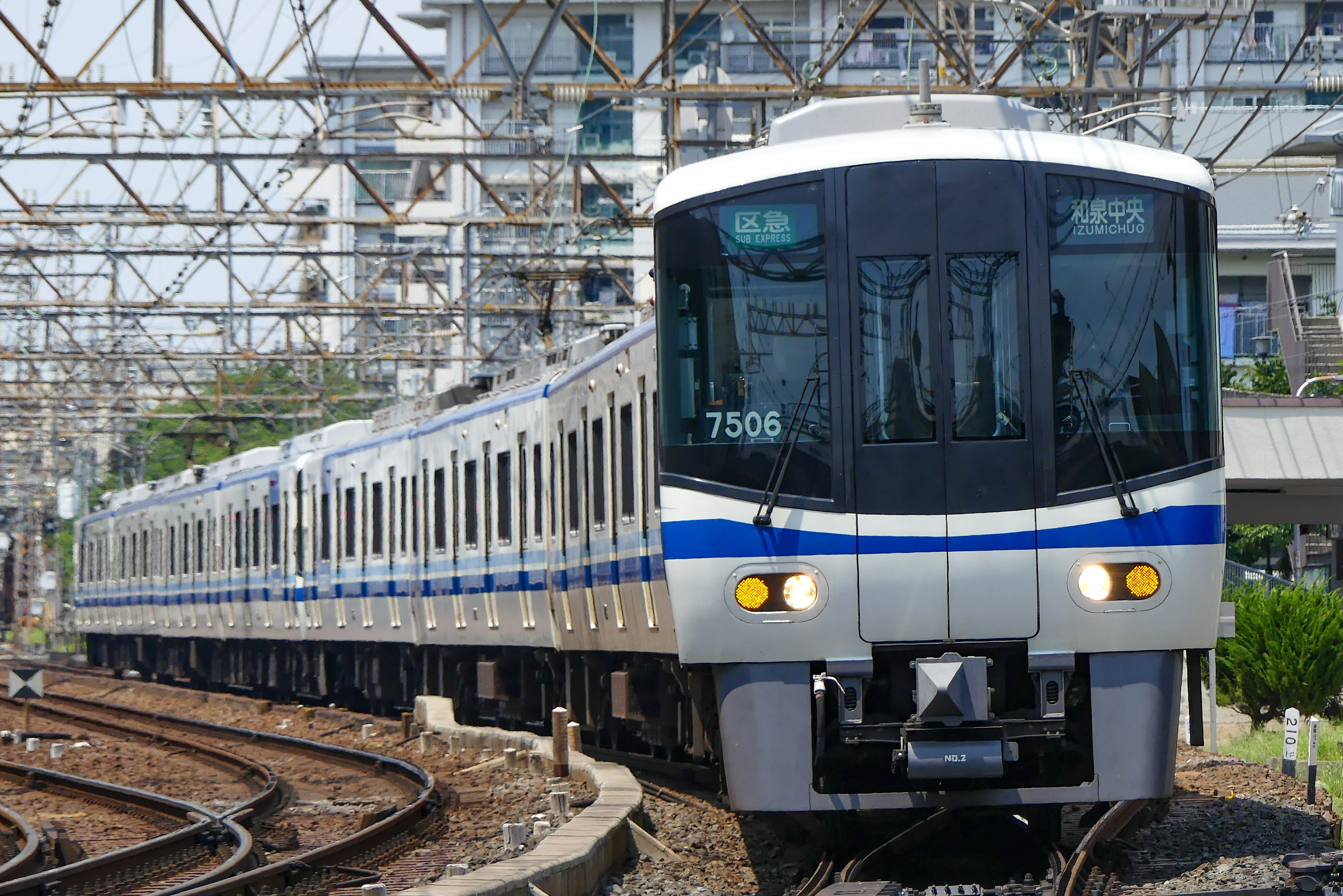
- A Semboku 7000 series in 2018
- In service: 1996–present
- Manufacturer: Kawasaki Heavy Industries
- Replaced: 100 series
- Constructed: 7000 series: 1996–1998; 7020 series: 2007–2008
- Entered service: 7000 series: 1996; 7020 series: 2007
- Number built: 7000 series: 26 vehicles (6 sets); 7020 series: 18 vehicles (4 sets)
- Number in service: 7000 series: 26 vehicles (6 sets); 7020 series: 18 vehicles (4 sets)
- Formation: 2/4/6 cars per trainset
- Fleet numbers: 7000 series: 7501–7511 (odd numbers only); 7020 series: 7521–7525, 7571 (odd numbers only)
- Capacity: 157 (intermediate cars); 146 (end cars)
- Operators: Nankai Electric Railway
- Lines served: Nankai Main Line; Koya Line; Semboku Line

Specifications
- Car body construction: Aluminum
- Car length: 20,825 mm (68 ft 4 in) (end cars); 20,725 mm (68 ft 0 in) (intermediate cars)
- Width: 2,844 mm (9 ft 4 in)
- Height: 4,050 mm (13 ft 3 in)
- Maximum speed: 120 km/h (75 mph)
- Traction system: Variable frequency
- Acceleration: 2.5 km/(h⋅s) (1.6 mph/s)
- Electric system(s): 1,500 V DC overhead wire
- Current collector(s): Pantograph
- Braking system(s): Electronically controlled pneumatic brakes
- Multiple working: 7020 series
- Track gauge: 1,067 mm (3 ft 6 in)

The Semboku 7000 series (泉北7000系, Senboku 7000-kei) is an electric multiple unit (EMU) train type operated by the private railway operator Nankai Electric Railway.

Sets introduced in 2007 are designated as 7020 series.

== 7000 series ==
Trainsets are formed as follows:

=== Six-car sets ===
Car No.	1	2	3	4	5	6
Designation	Tc1	M1	M2	T	M3	Tc2

=== Four-car sets ===
Car No.	1	2	3	4
Designation	Tc1	M1	M2	Tc2

=== Two-car sets ===
Car No.	1	2
Designation	Tc	Mc

== 7020 series ==
Trainsets are formed as follows:

=== Six-car sets ===
Car No.	1	2	3	4	5	6
Designation	Tc1	M1	M2	T	M3	Tc2

=== Four-car set ===
Car No.	1	2	3	4
Designation	Tc1	M1	M2	Tc2

=== Two-car set ===
Car No.	1	2
Designation	Tc	Mc

== Interior ==
Seating consists of longitudinal seating throughout.

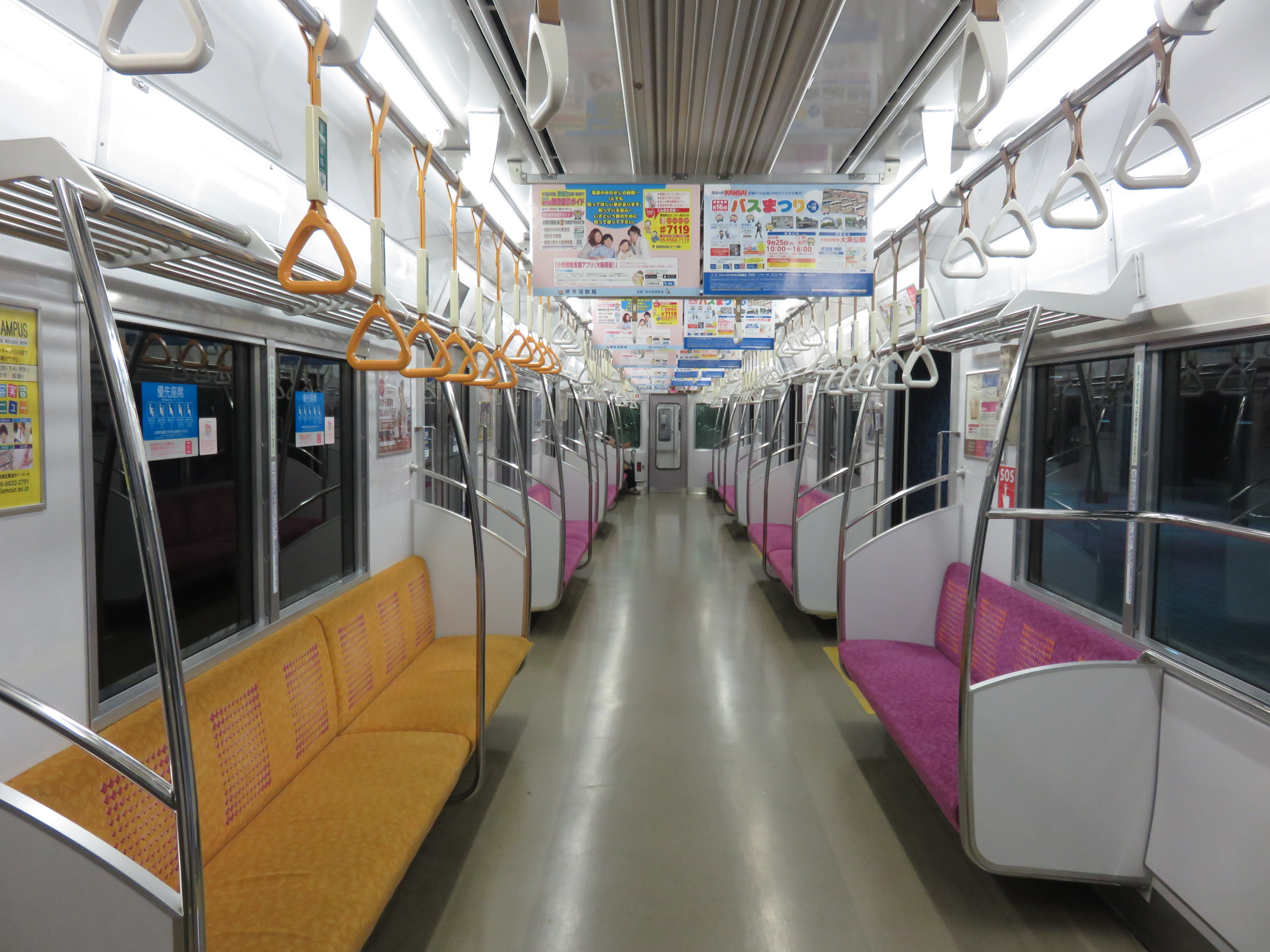
Inside a 7020 series car

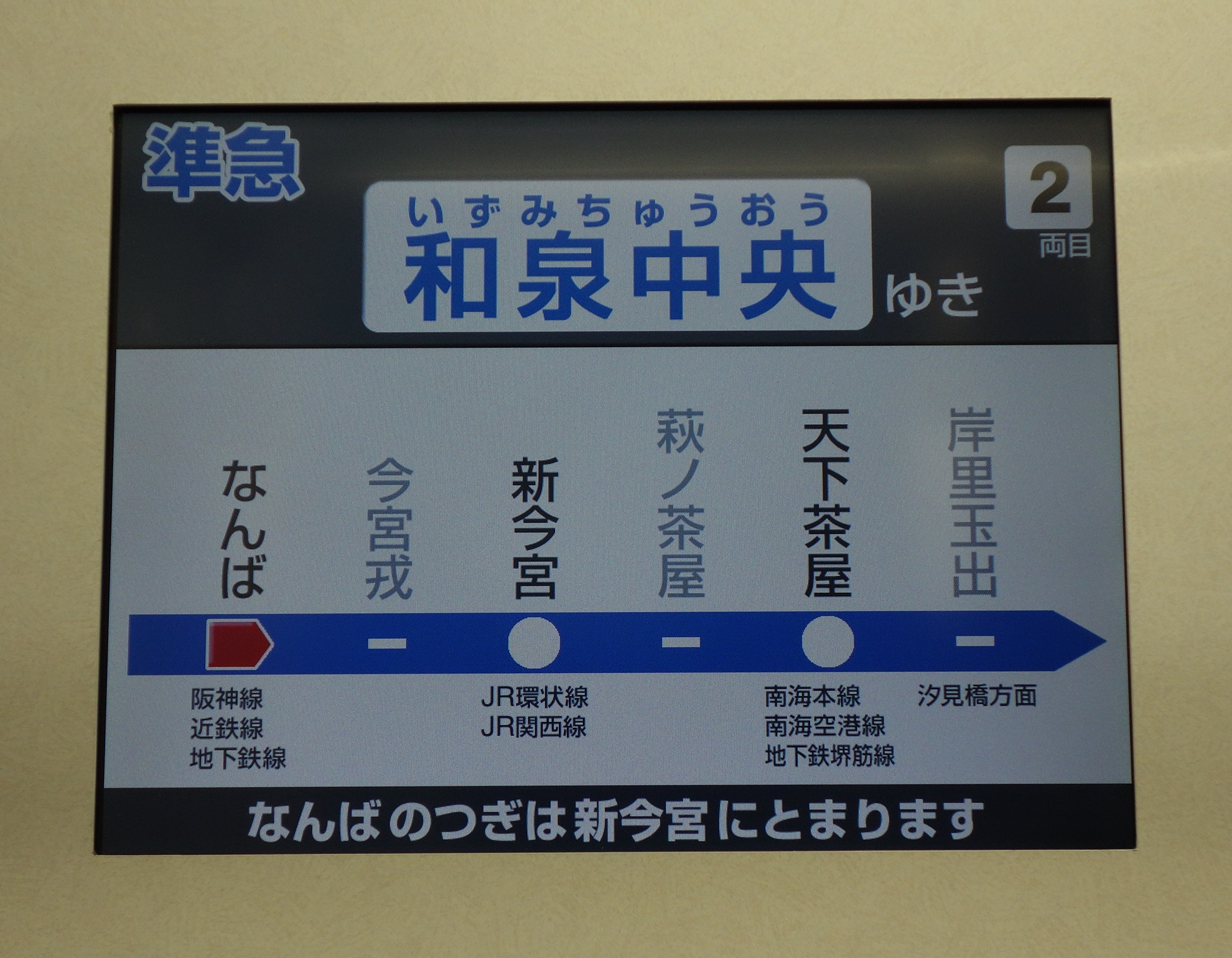
LCD Screen

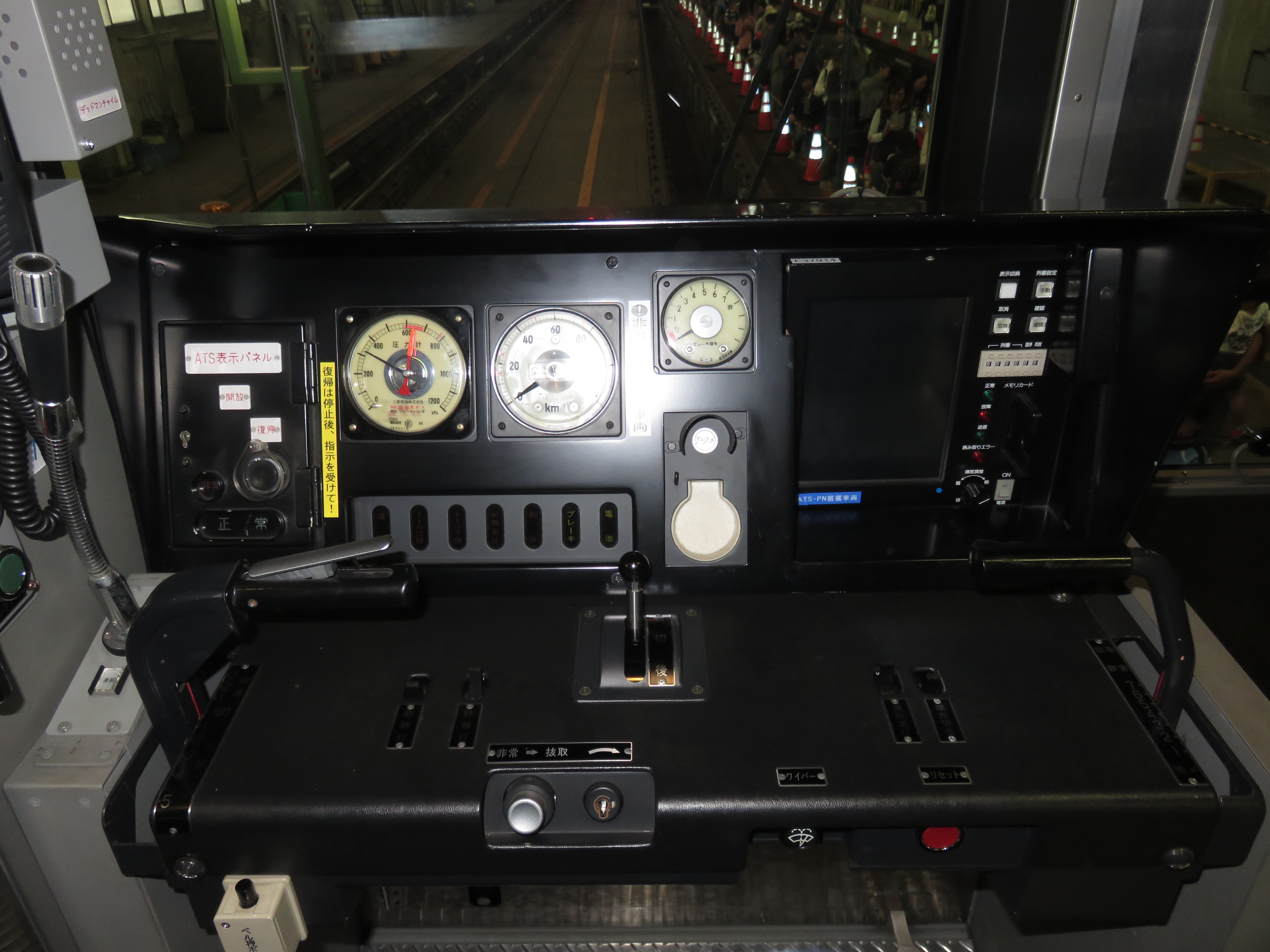
Driver's cab

== History ==
The 7000 series first appeared in 1996. It is the second original design for the Semboku Railway following the 5000 series.

These are the second series in the Semboku fleet to feature aluminum bodies and VVVF inverters.

The 7020 series was introduced in 2007 and implements a selection of improvements to the original 7000 series including more handstraps, stanctions, and distinguishable priority seating. The difference between the 7020 series and the 7000 series is that the 7020 series has a distinguishable single centered front door.

In November 2022, Semboku Rapid Railway announced its plans to introduce an updated livery for its 7000, 7020, and 5000 series sets to match that of the then-new 9300 series, with the light blue waistline stripe omitted. After Semboku and Nankai announced their plans to merge, the fleet's Semboku logos have gradually been replaced with Nankai logos.

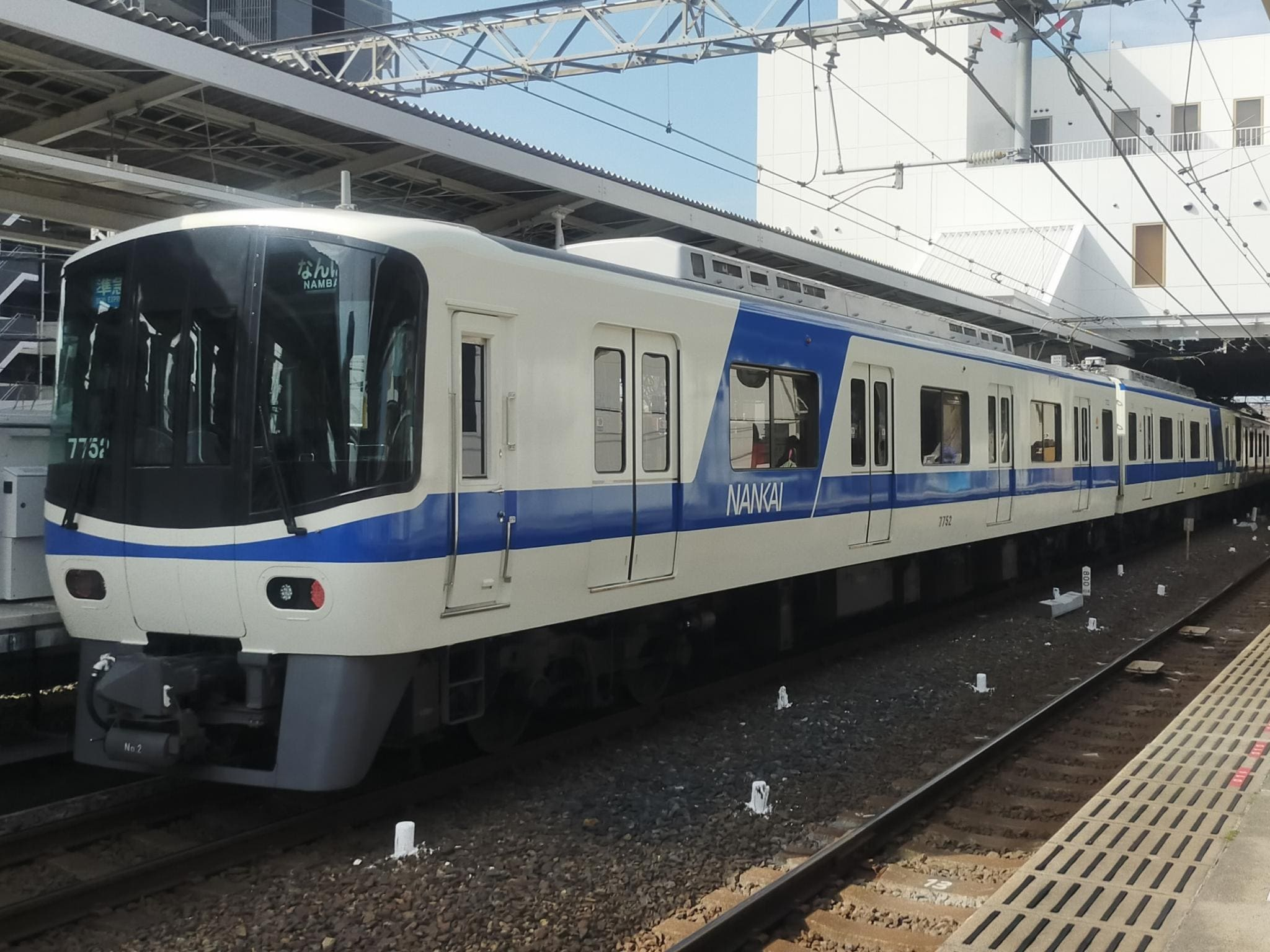
7000 series set with updated livery and Nankai wordmark in February 2025

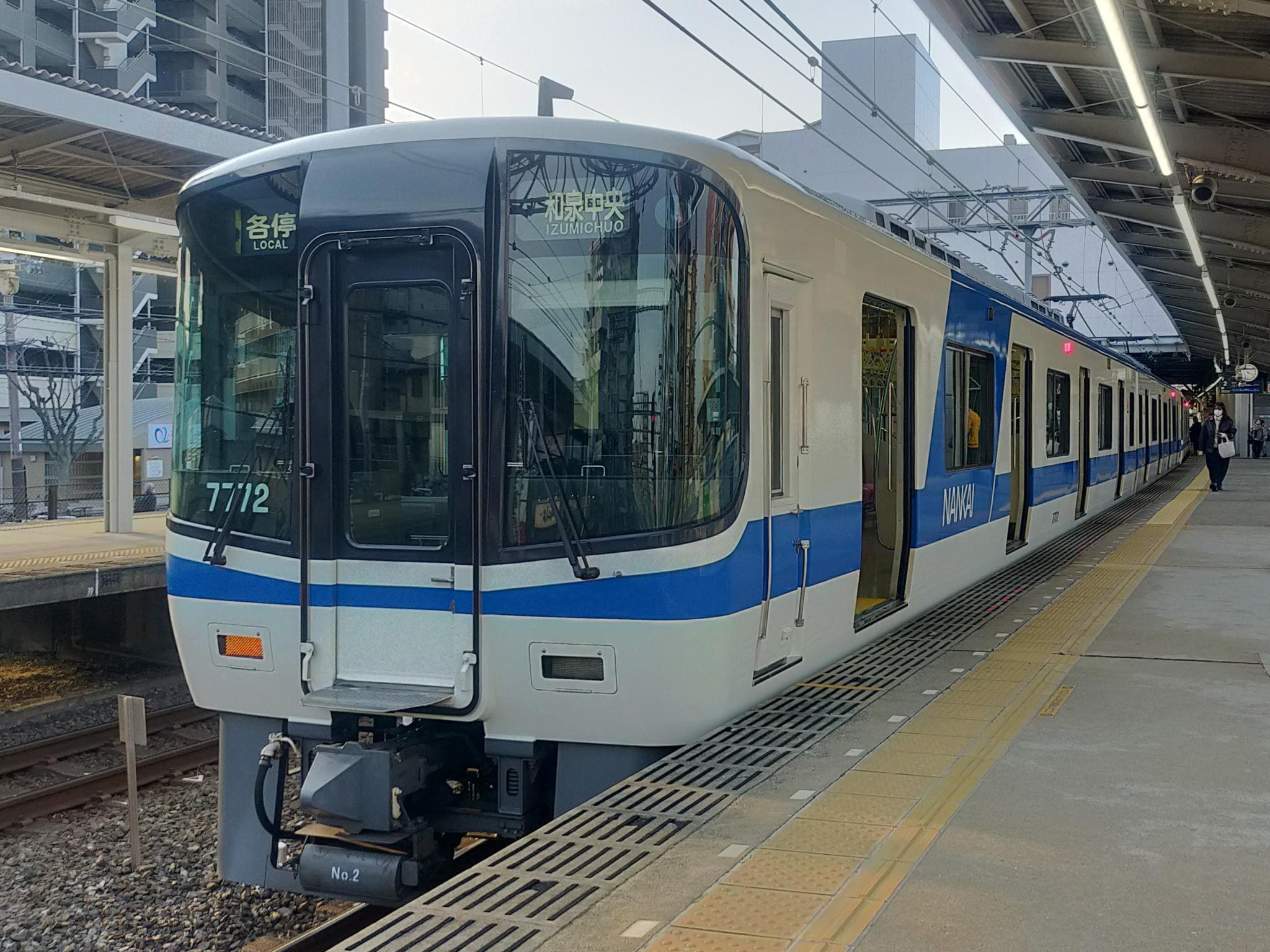
7020 series set with updated livery and Nankai wordmark in February 2025

=== Operations ===
The trains are used on through-services from Namba to Izumi-Chūō via the Nankai Main Line and Semboku Line, as well as on services on the Koya Line.

Following the merger of the Semboku Rapid Railway into its parent company on 1 April 2025, all sets became property of Nankai Electric Railway.

=== Special liveries ===
As the flagship rolling stock of the Semboku Rapid Railway, the trainsets have received various promotional liveries. From April 2015 through 2018, 7020 series set 7521 was wrapped in a livery to promote the 20th anniversary of the opening of Izumi-Chūō station. Starting in October 2017, 7000 series set 7509 was wrapped in a livery, entitled "Frontier", to promote characters featured at the Osaka Prefectural Children's Center.

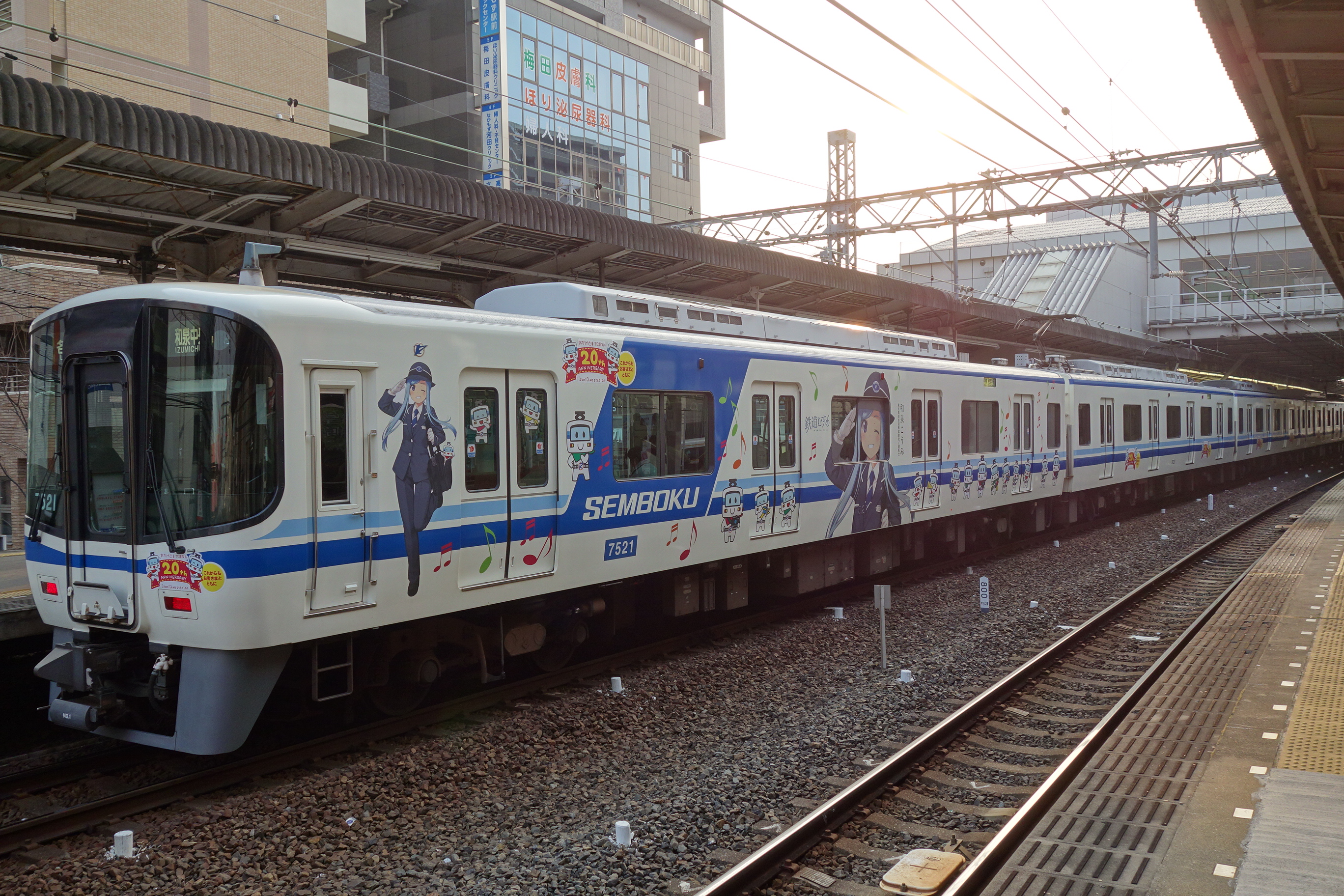
Celebrational wrap on set 7521

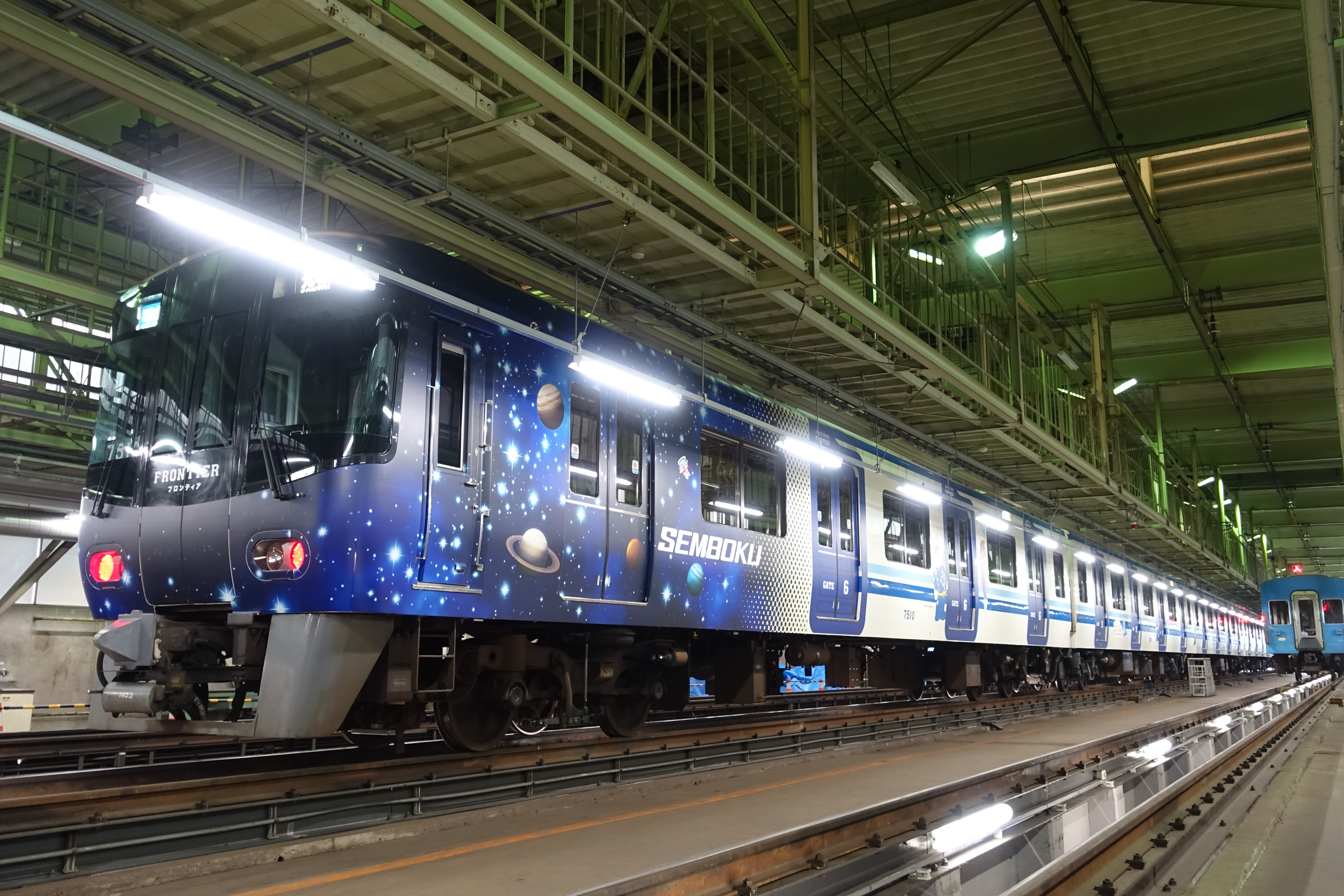
"Frontier" wrap on set 7509
