= Nobuko Okashita =

Japanese politician (born 1939)

- 岡下 信子
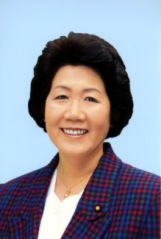
- Official portrait, 2006

Member of the House of Representatives
- In office 11 September 2005 – 30 August 2009
- Preceded by: Shingo Nishimura
- Succeeded by: Megumu Tsuji
- Constituency: Osaka 17th
- In office 26 June 2000 – 10 October 2003
- Preceded by: Shingo Nishimura
- Succeeded by: Shingo Nishimura
- Constituency: Osaka 17th

Personal details
- Born: 28 June 1939 (age 87) Kan'onji, Kagawa, Japan
- Party: Liberal Democratic
- Children: Shohei Okashita
- Education: Gakushuin Women's Junior College

Nobuko Okashita (岡下 信子, Okashita Nobuko; born 28 June 1939) is a retired Japanese politician of the Liberal Democratic Party, who served as a member of the House of Representatives in the Diet (national legislature). A native of Kagawa Prefecture and graduate of Gakushuin Women's Junior College, she was elected to the House of Representatives for the first time in 2000. She lost her seat in 2003 but was re-elected two years later.
