= Semboku Line =

Railway line in Osaka Prefecture, Japan

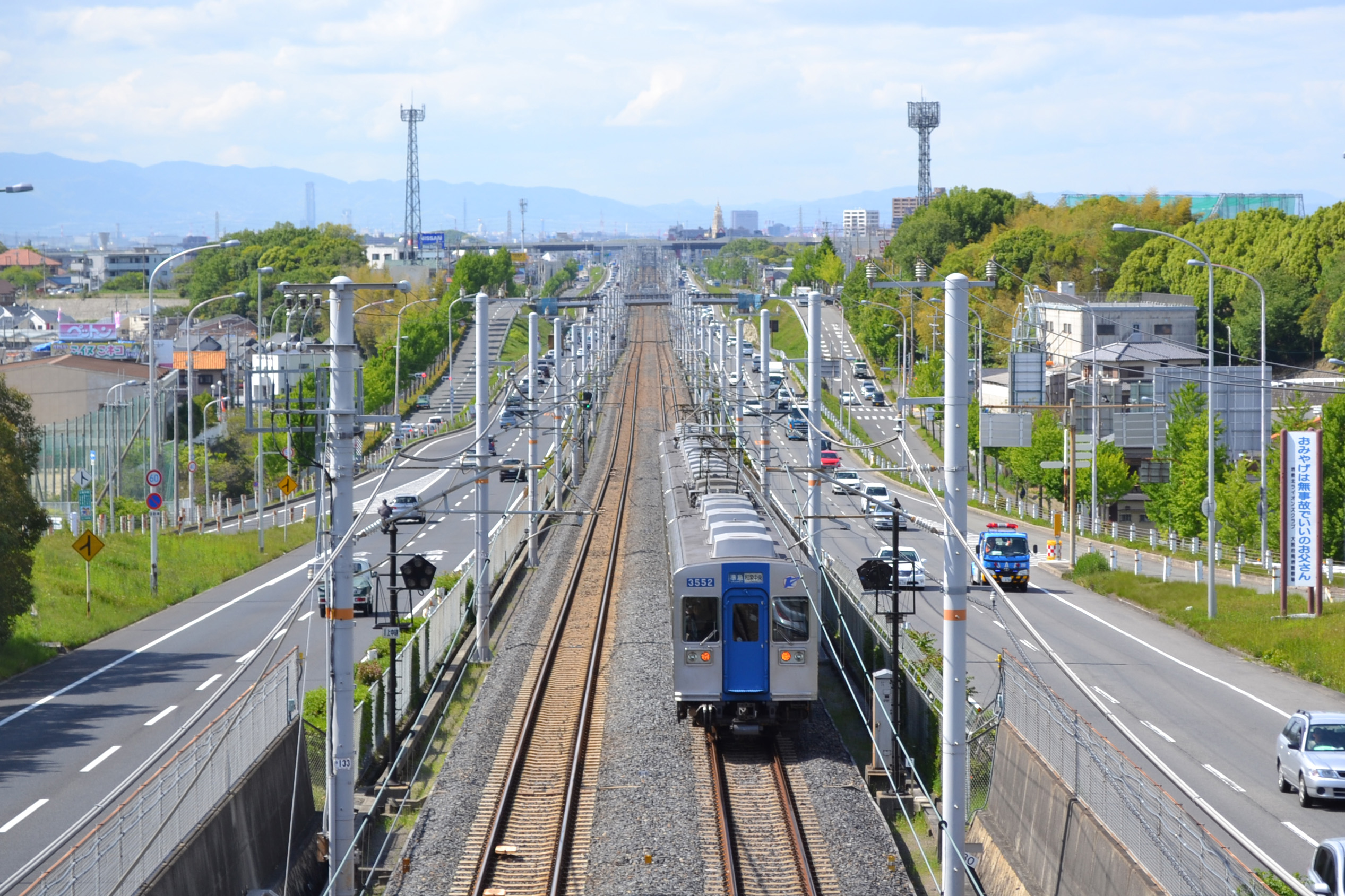
- A Semboku Rapid Railway 3000 series train in May 2013

Overview
- Native name: 泉北線
- Status: Operational
- Owner: Nankai Electric Railway
- Locale: Osaka Prefecture
- Termini: Nakamozu; Izumi-Chūō
- Stations: 6

Service
- Type: Commuter rail
- Depot(s): Nakamozu
- Daily ridership: 168,949 (daily 2015)

History
- Opened: 1 April 1971; 55 years ago

Technical
- Line length: 14.3 km (8.9 mi)
- Number of tracks: 2
- Track gauge: 1,067 mm (3 ft 6 in)
- Minimum radius: 400 m
- Electrification: 1,500 V DC, overhead catenary
- Operating speed: 100 km/h (60 mph)

The Semboku Line (泉北線, Senboku-sen) is a railway line in Osaka Prefecture, Japan, operated by the private railway operator Nankai Electric Railway. The line connects Izumi-Chūō Station and Nakamozu Station, with through operations to and from the Kōya Line up to Namba Station in southern downtown Osaka.

== Services ==
Along with services inside the line, through trains also operate to the Kōya Line beyond Nakamozu to Namba.

■Limited Express Semboku Liner (特急 泉北ライナー, Tokkyū Senboku Rainā) (LE)
All seats are reserved. Operations started on 5 December 2015. Trains pass Sakaihigashi and Fukai non-stop for the first time.

■Sub-Express (区間急行, Kukan Kyūkō) (SbE)
Operated all day, through to Namba.

■Semi-Express (準急, Junkyū) (SmE)
Trains are operated all day, through to Namba.

■Local (各駅停車, Kakueki Teisha) (L)
Operated all day. Mainly shuttles between Nakamozu and Izumi-Chūō (some trains for Komyoike). During the daytime and late at night, some services operate between Izumi-Chūō and Namba.

== List of stations ==
All stations are located in Osaka Prefecture.

- O: Trains stop.
- |: Trains pass.
- See the Koya Line article for the stops of the through trains to Namba between Namba and Nakamozu.

No.	Station	Japanese	Distance (km)	L	SmE	SbE	LE	Transfers	Location	
NK59	Nakamozu	中百舌鳥	0.0	O	O	|	|	Kōya Line (Through trains are available); Osaka Metro Midōsuji Line (M30)	Kita-ku	Sakai
NK88	Fukai	深井	3.7	O	O	O	|		Naka-ku	Sakai
NK89	Izumigaoka	泉ケ丘	7.8	O	O	O	O		Minami-ku	Sakai
NK90	Toga-Mikita	栂・美木多	10.2	O	O	O	O		Minami-ku	Sakai
NK91	Kōmyōike	光明池	12.1	O	O	O	O		Minami-ku	Sakai
NK92	Izumi-Chūō	和泉中央	14.3	O	O	O	O		Izumi	

== Rolling stock ==
=== Semboku Liner limited express services ===
- Semboku 12000 series EMU
- Nankai 11000 series EMU (sometimes substituted by Nankai 12000 series)

From 27 January 2017, a new Semboku 12000 series EMU was introduced on Semboku Liner services.

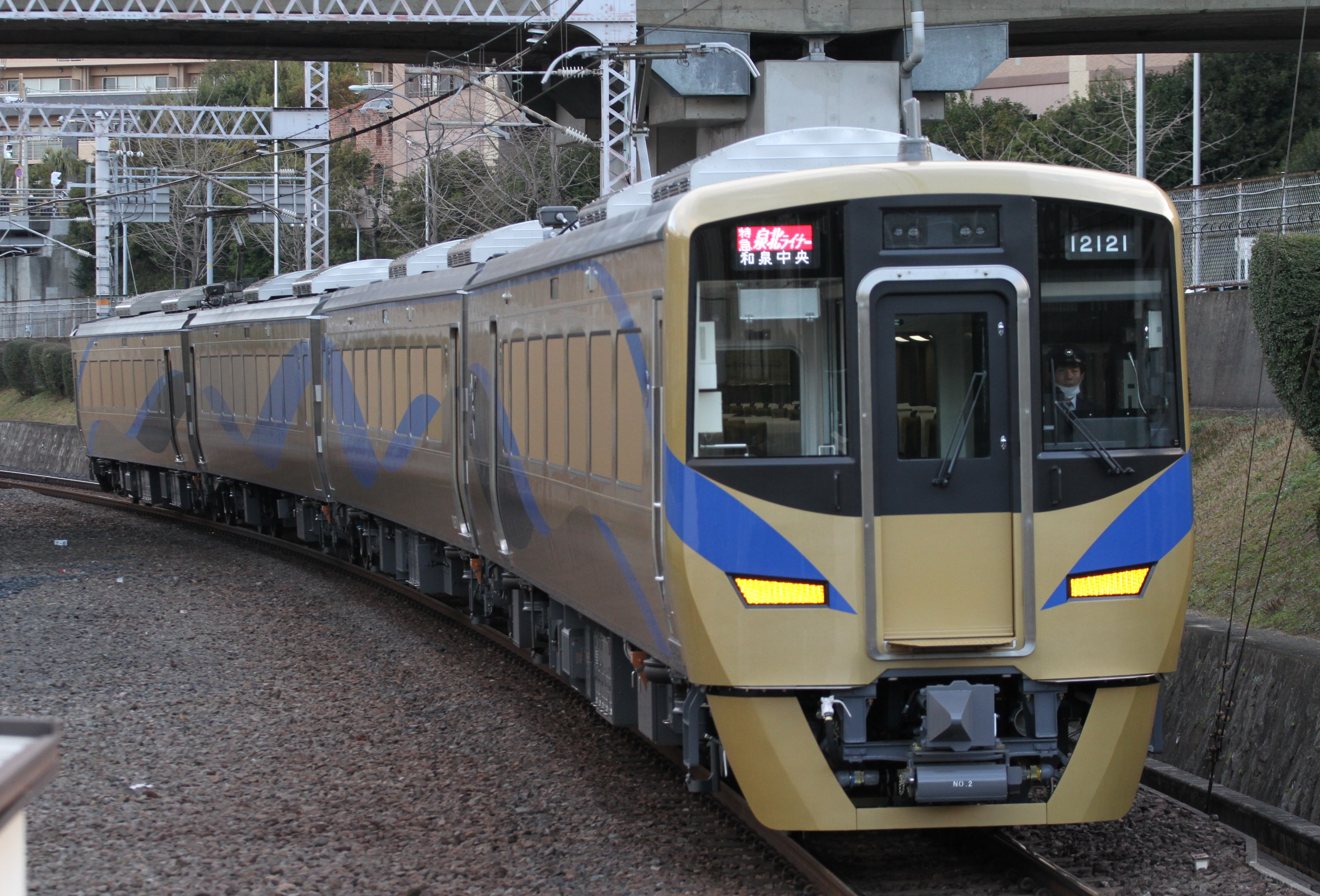
The Semboku 12000 series on a Semboku Liner service in February 2017

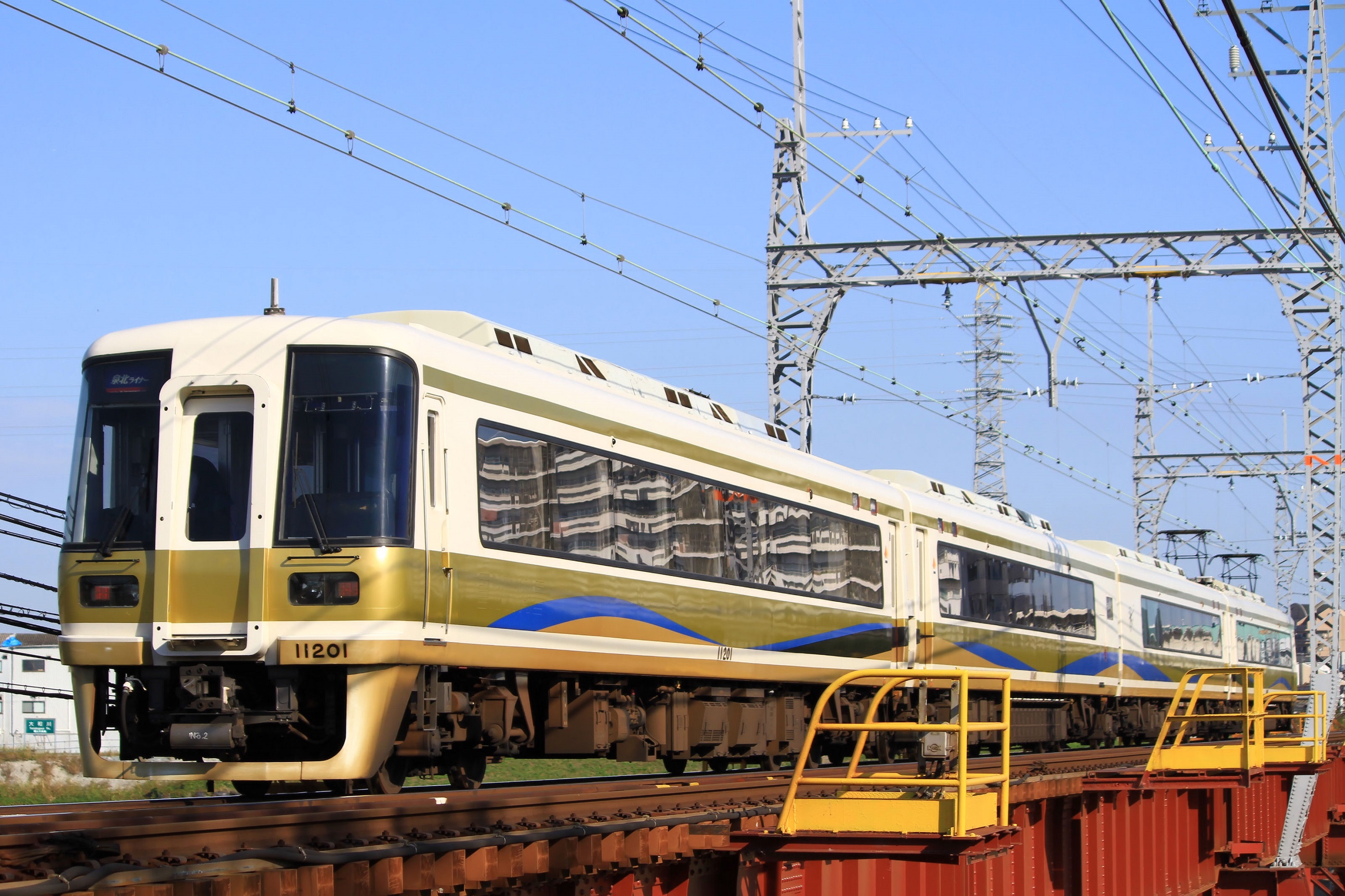
The Nankai 11000 series on a Semboku Liner service in November 2018

=== Local services ===
- Semboku 3000 series two- and four-car EMUs with stainless steel bodies
- Semboku 5000 series eight-car EMUs with aluminium bodies
- Semboku 7000 series two-, four-, and six-car EMUs with aluminium bodies
- Semboku 7020 series two-, four-, and six-car EMUs with aluminium bodies
- Semboku 9300 series four-car EMUs with stainless steel bodies (since 8 August 2023)
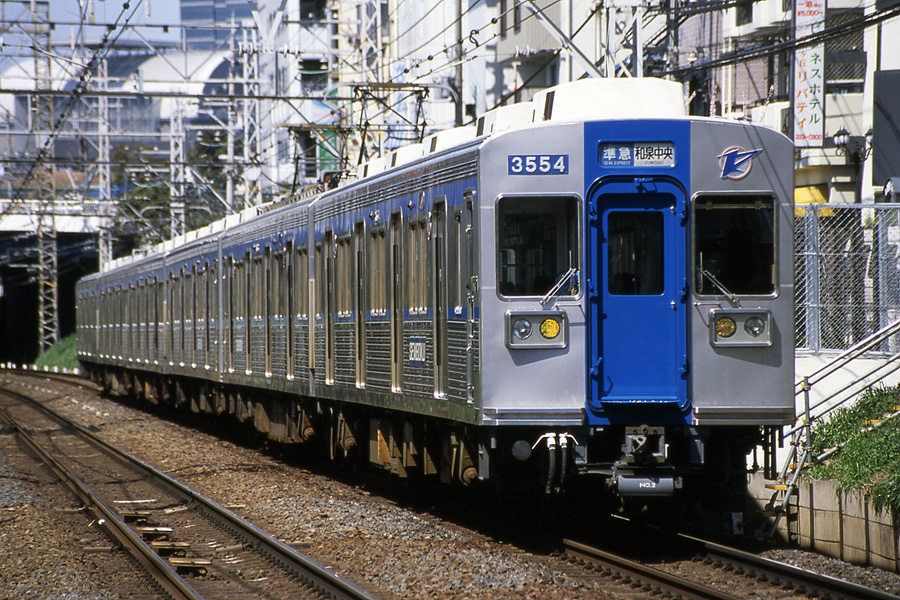
A Semboku 3000 series EMU

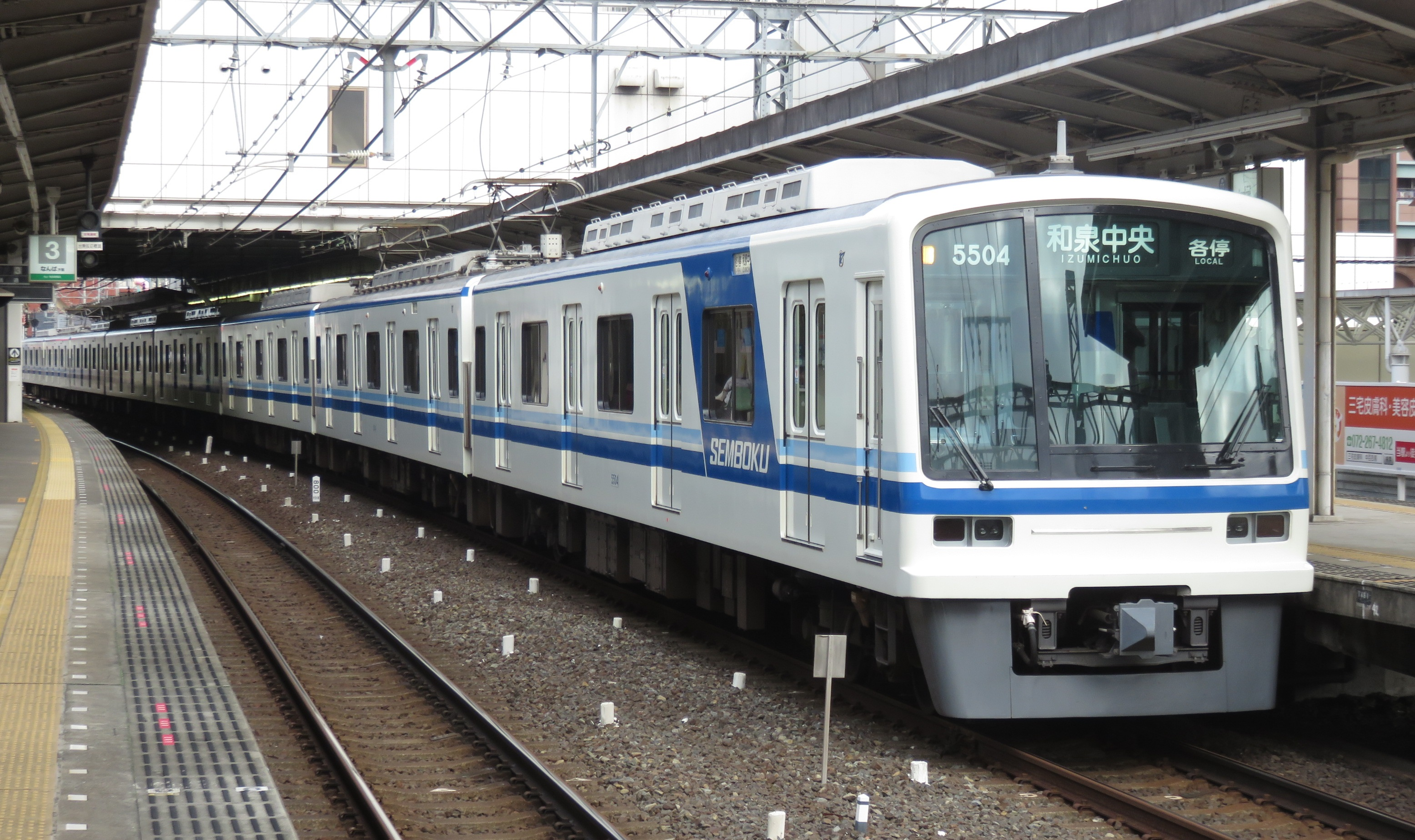
A Semboku 5000 series EMU in September 2016

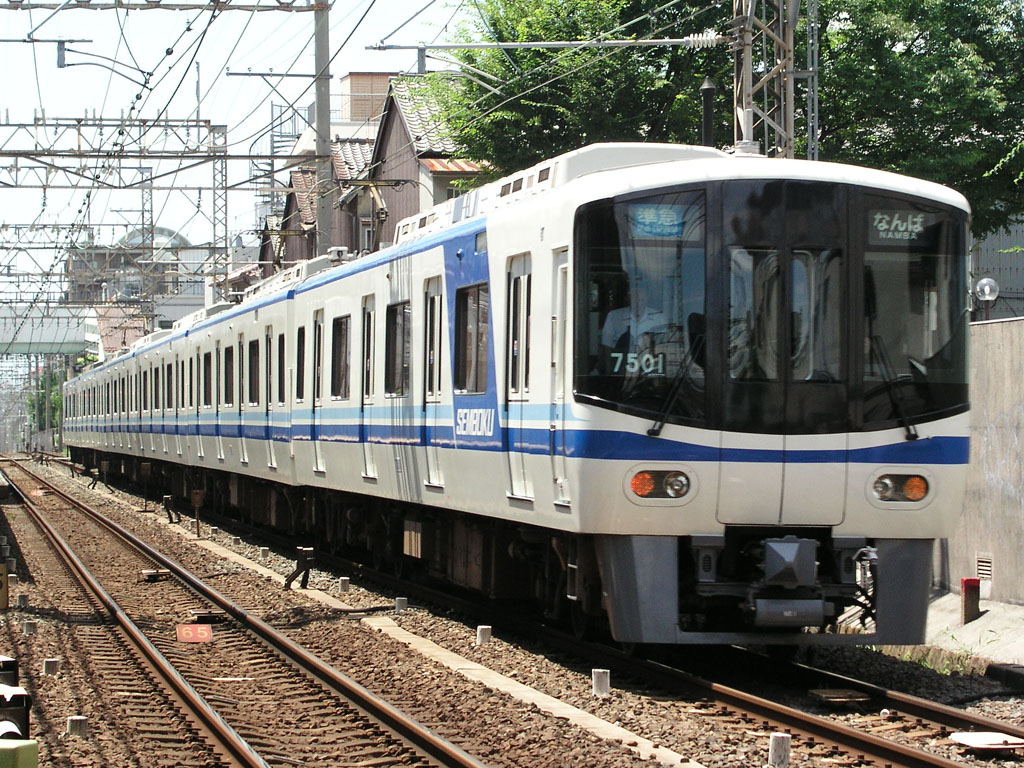
A Semboku 7000 series EMU

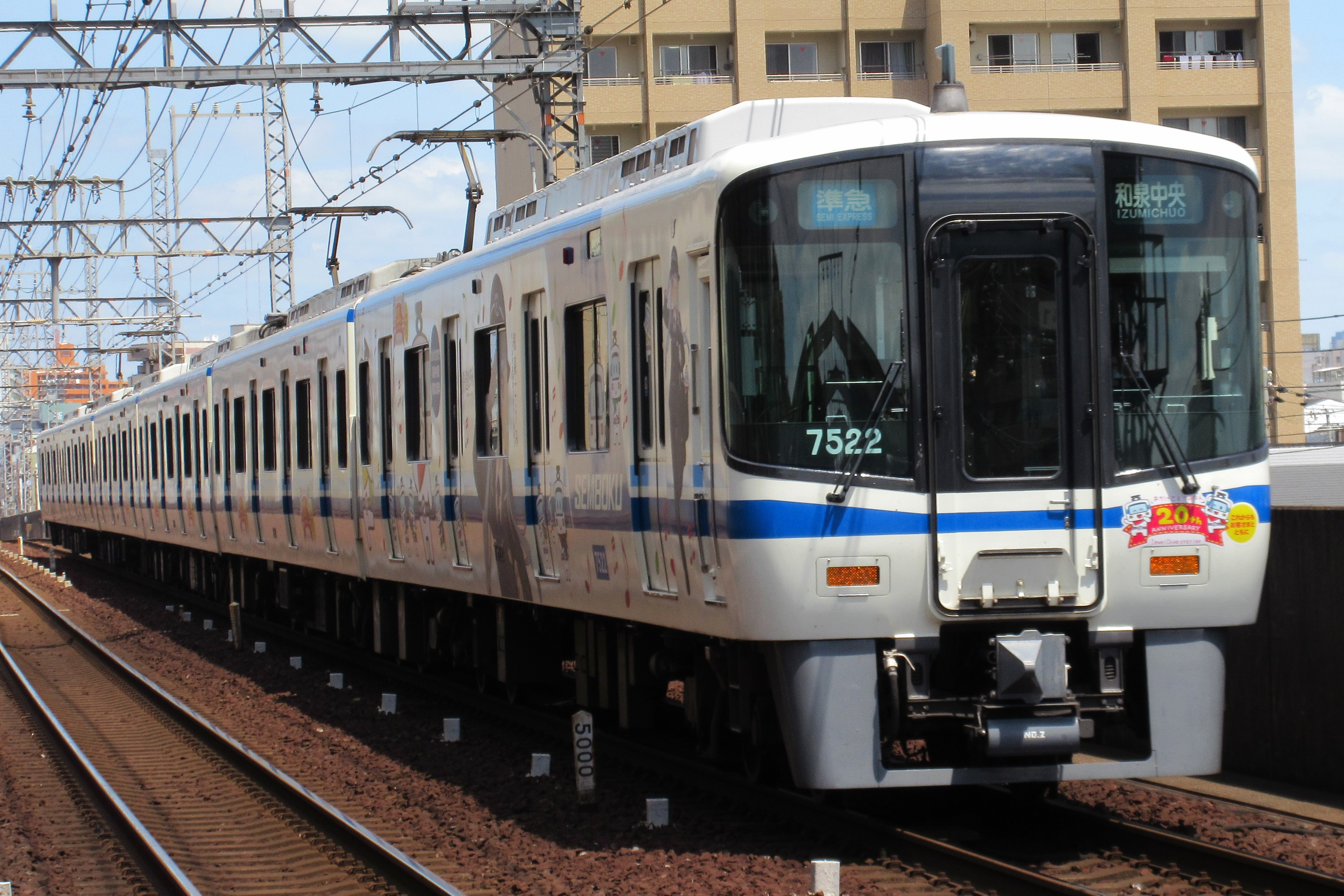
A Semboku 7020 series EMU in August 2015

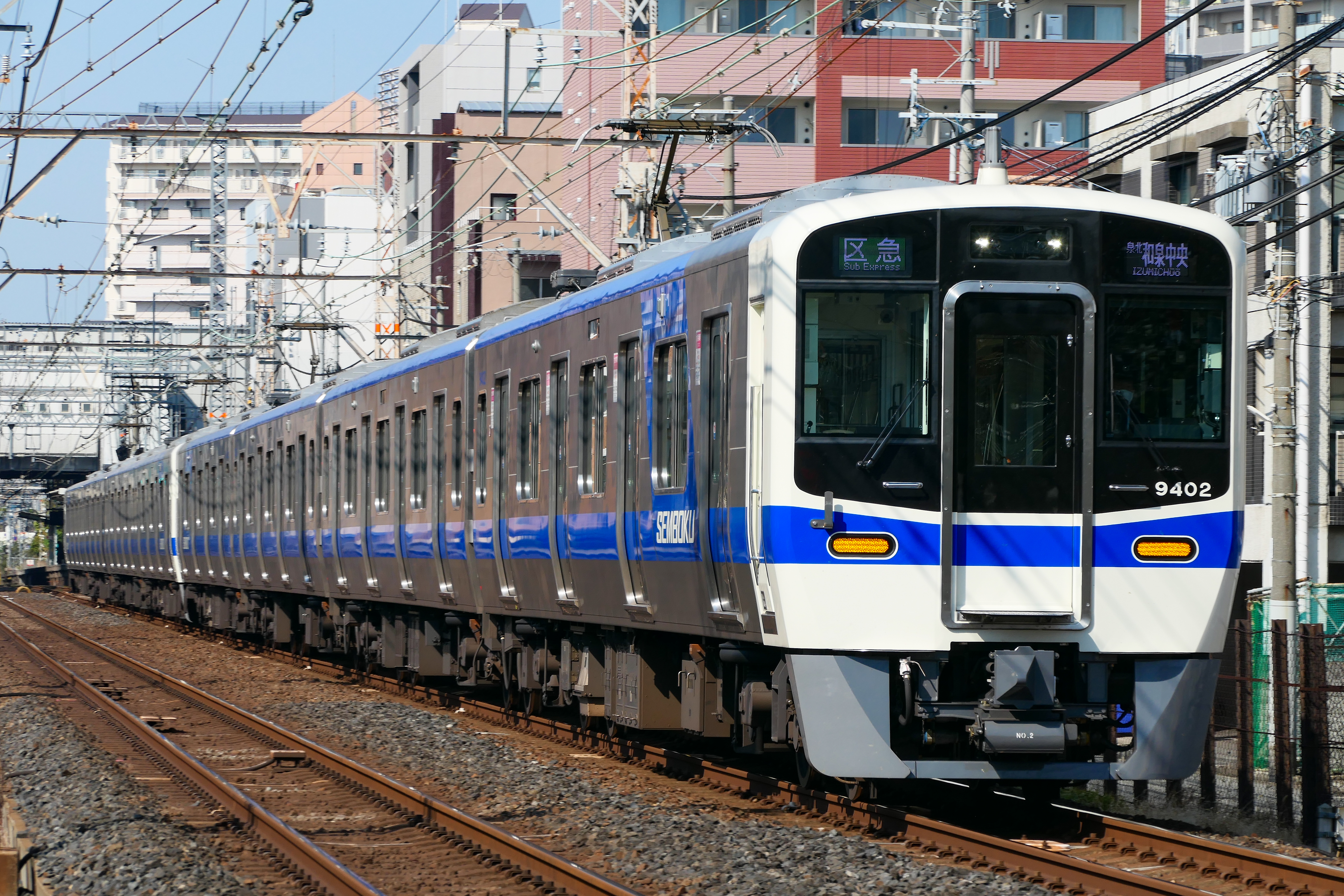
A Semboku 9300 series EMU in October 2023

=== Former rolling stock ===
- Semboku 100 series
- Nankai 50000 series EMUs (Semboku Liner, November 2022 – 2023)
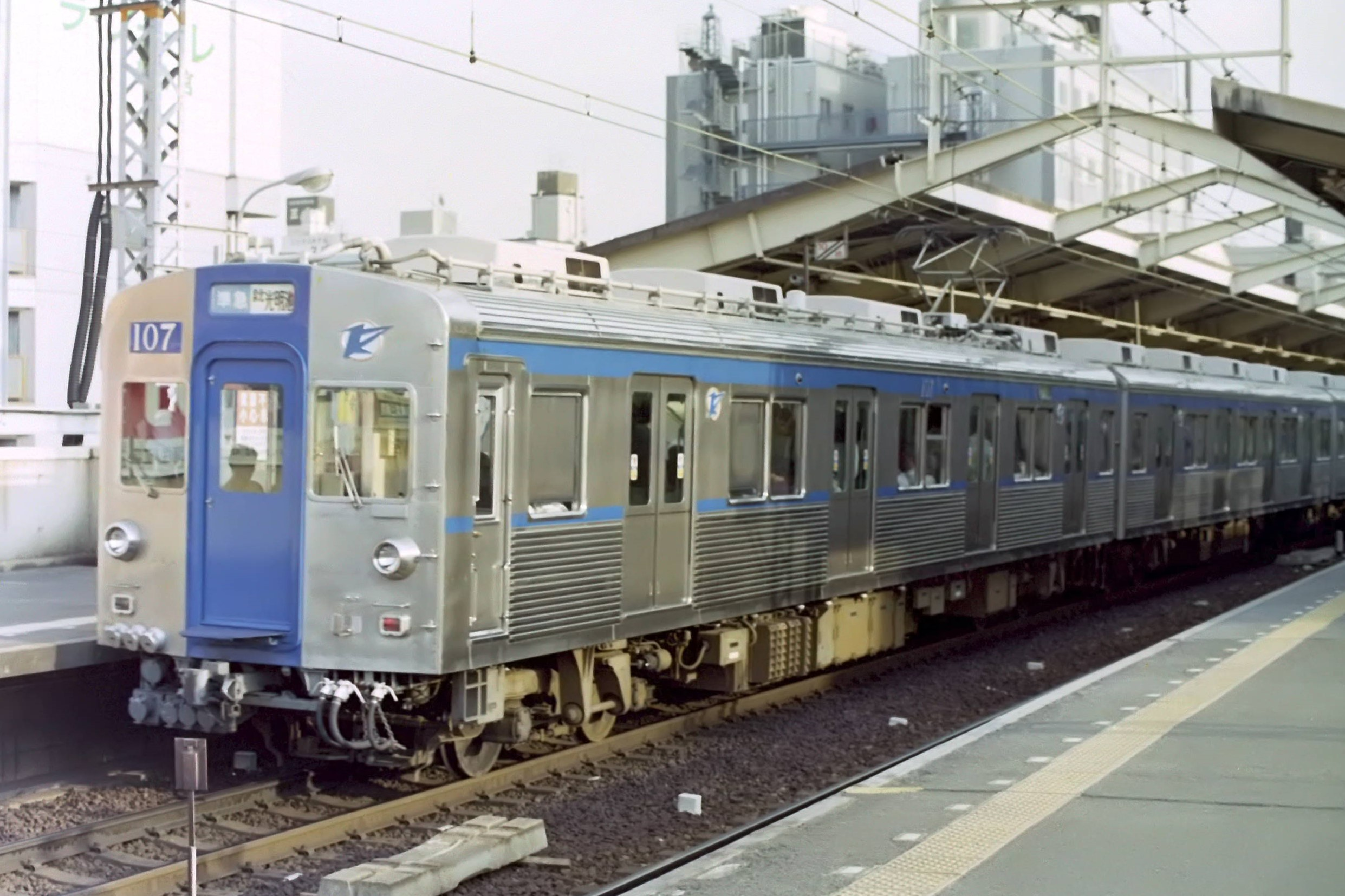
A Semboku 100 series EMU in May 1995

== History ==
The section from Nakamozu to Izumigaoka opened on 1 April 1971 as the Semboku Rapid Railway Line (泉北高速鉄道線, Senboku Kōsoku Tetsudō-sen), with 1,067 mm (3 ft 6 in) double track and electrification at 600 V DC. The overhead line voltage was increased to 1,500 V DC from 7 October 1973, and the line was extended to Toga-Mikita on 7 December 1973.

The line was extended to Kōmyōike on 20 August 1977, and to Izumi-Chūō on 1 April 1995.

Owing to ongoing financial constraints caused by the COVID-19 pandemic, Semboku Rapid Railway announced that it would be merged into Nankai Railway. The merger took place on 1 April 2025. In addition, the line was renamed to the Semboku Line. Stations were renumbered to NK88 at Fukai through NK92 at Izumi-Chūō.

== See also ==
- List of railway lines in Japan
