= Semboku Rapid Railway (company) =

Japanese railway company

Semboku Rapid Railway Co., Ltd.
- Industry: Railway
- Founded: 24 December 1965; 60 years ago
- Defunct: 31 March 2025; 15 months ago
- Fate: Acquired by Nankai Railway
- Headquarters: Izumi, Osaka Prefecture, Japan
- Owner: Nankai

Semboku Rapid Railway Co., Ltd. (泉北高速鉄道株式会社, Senboku Kōsoku Tetsudō Kabushiki Gaisha) is a company managing the commercial distribution center and the Semboku Rapid Railway in Osaka Prefecture, Japan. It was formerly known as a third-sector company Osaka Prefectural Urban Development Co., Ltd. (大阪府都市開発株式会社, Ōsaka-fu Toshi Kaihatsu Kabushiki Gaisha) until 30 June 2014. Osaka Prefectural Urban Development and its subsidiary company were called the OTK Group (OTKグループ, OTK Gurūpu) together.

== Business summary ==
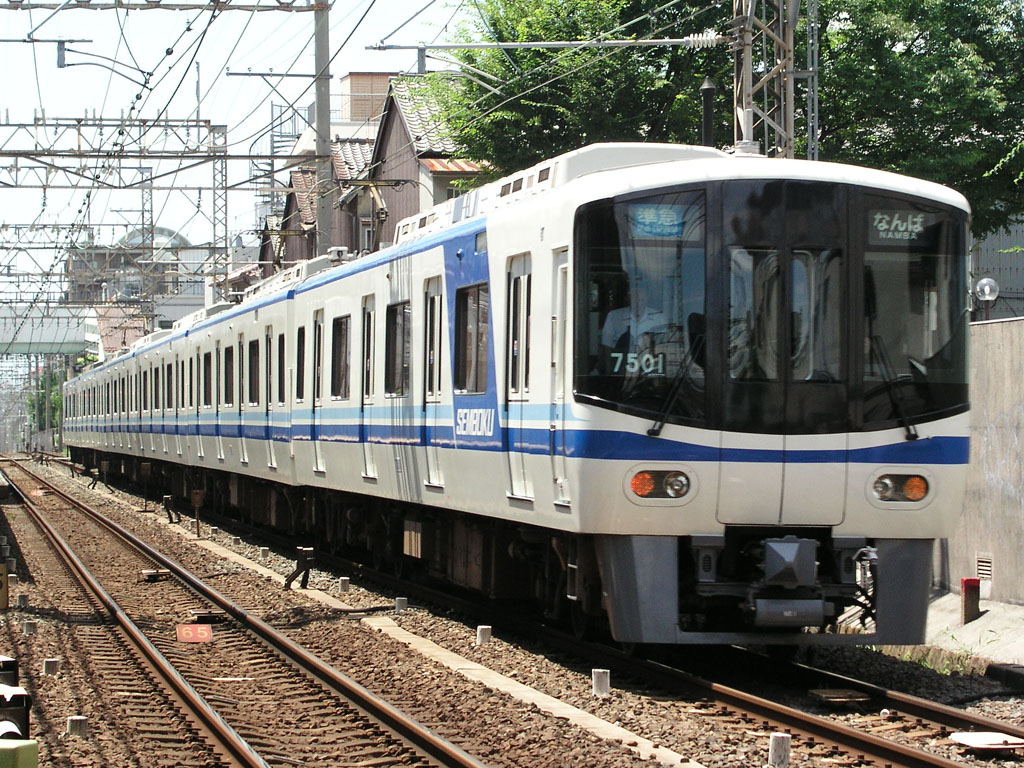
A Semboku Rapid Railway 7000 series train

The main purpose of the company that most are familiar with is the operation of the Semboku Rapid Railway in southern Osaka Prefecture. The railroad starts at Nakamozu Station on the Nankai Kōya Line and ends at Izumi-Chūō Station. During the 1960s, the Osaka Prefectural government planned a route link to Semboku New Town, one of many planned communities at the time of the post-war boom. The Nankai Electric Railway was to undertake the total planning, construction and operation of the new route, but because Nankai had several large accidents in the later half of that decade, Japan's national railroad safety board forced Nankai to purchase new rolling stock and start restoration track and wayside equipment. Because of the required sudden investment, Nankai stalled on the Semboku line's construction timetable. The Osaka prefectural government, using an existing third sector company, stepped in to undertake the new railway's construction and operation.

In addition to this, the original business as a logistics distribution center management body is still in operation. There are currently two truck terminals under its management in the following locations:

- Higashi Osaka commercial distribution center
- Kita-Osaka commercial distribution center

On 1 July 2014, the share of the company owned by the prefectural government was transferred to Nankai Electric Railway and the company joined the Nankai Group.

=== Merger with Nankai Electric Railway ===
Owing to ongoing financial constraints caused by the COVID-19 pandemic, Semboku Rapid Railway announced that it would be merged into parent company Nankai Electric Railway. The company was expected to fold its operations into Nankai by 31 March 2025

On 1 November 2024, Ministry of Land, Infrastructure, Transport and Tourism (MLIT) approved the merger, which took effect on 1 April 2025.

== Railroad route ==
- Semboku Line (prior to April 1, 2025, under the ownership of Semboku Rapid Railway the line was named Semboku Rapid Railway Line (泉北高速鉄道線, Senboku Kōsoku Tetsudō-sen)

== Subsidiary companies ==
- Semboku Railway Service
- Sentersu Industries
- Rinku International Physical Distribution
- Panjo
- Osaka Rinku Hotel

== See also ==
- Nankai Electric Railway
