= Minami-ku, Sakai =

Ward of Sakai, Osaka Prefecture, Japan

Coordinates: 34°29′11.5″N 135°29′26.06″E

Minami-ku in the city

Minami-ku (南区) is a ward of the city of Sakai in Osaka Prefecture, Japan. The ward has an area of 40.44 km^{2} and a population of 155,266. The population density is 3,839 per km^{2}. The name means "South Ward."

The wards of Sakai were established when Sakai became a city designated by government ordinance on April 1, 2006.

== Education ==
=== Universities and colleges ===
- Tezukayama Gakuin University Izumigaoka Campus
- St. Andrew's University of Education
- Osaka Junior College of Social Health and Welfare

== Transportation ==
=== Rail ===
- Nankai Electric Railway
  - Semboku Line: Izumigaoka Station - Toga-Mikita Station - Kōmyōike Station

=== Road ===
- Hanwa Expressway (Sakai Interchange)
