= Nakamozu Station =

Railway and metro station in Sakai, Japan

Nakamozu Station 中百舌鳥駅/なかもず駅/中もず駅
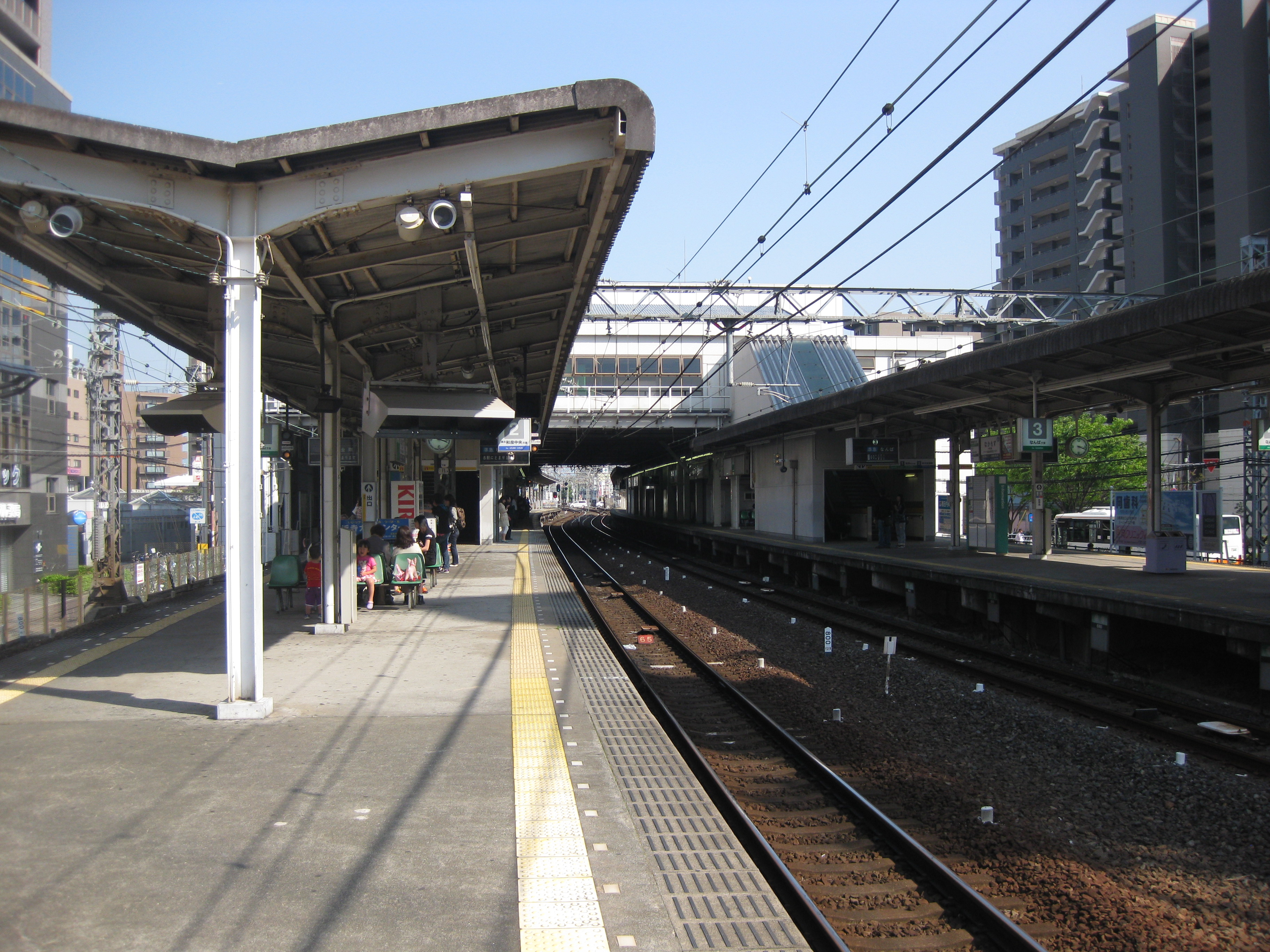

General information
- Location: 2 Nakamozu-cho, Kita-ku, Sakai-shi, Osaka-fu; Japan
- Coordinates: 34°33′22.41″N 135°30′16.07″E
- Operator: Nankai Electric Railway; Osaka Metro
- Lines: Nankai Kōya Line; Semboku Line; Midōsuji Line
- Platforms: 6
- Connections: Bus terminal

Other information
- Station code: M 30 , NK59 (Nankai), SB01 (Semboku)
Location
- Location within Osaka Prefecture Location within Japan

Nakamozu Station (中百舌鳥駅, Nakamozu-eki) is the name of two adjacent railway stations located in Kita-ku, Sakai, Osaka Prefecture, Japan. The above ground station is an interchange station operated jointly by the private Nankai Electric Railway and the Semboku Rapid Railway, and the underground station is operated by the Osaka Metro.

The name of the station is difficult to read in kanji. The subway station shows the name in hiragana (なかもず) for information, but uses kanji for the official station name. The Semboku Rapid Railway Line uses both kanji and hiragana (中もず) on the destination signs at the stations and on the destination displays on the trains.

== Lines ==
Nakamozu Station is served by the Nankai Koya Line, and is 14.1 kilometers from the terminus of the line at Shiomibashi and 13.4 kilometers from Nanba. It is also the terminus of the 14.3 kilometer Semboku Rapid Railway Line to Izumi-Chūō and the terminus of the 24.5 kilometer Midōsuji Line to Esaka.

== Layout ==
=== Nankai Railway Koya Line and Semboku Line ===
Nakamozu Station 中百舌鳥駅
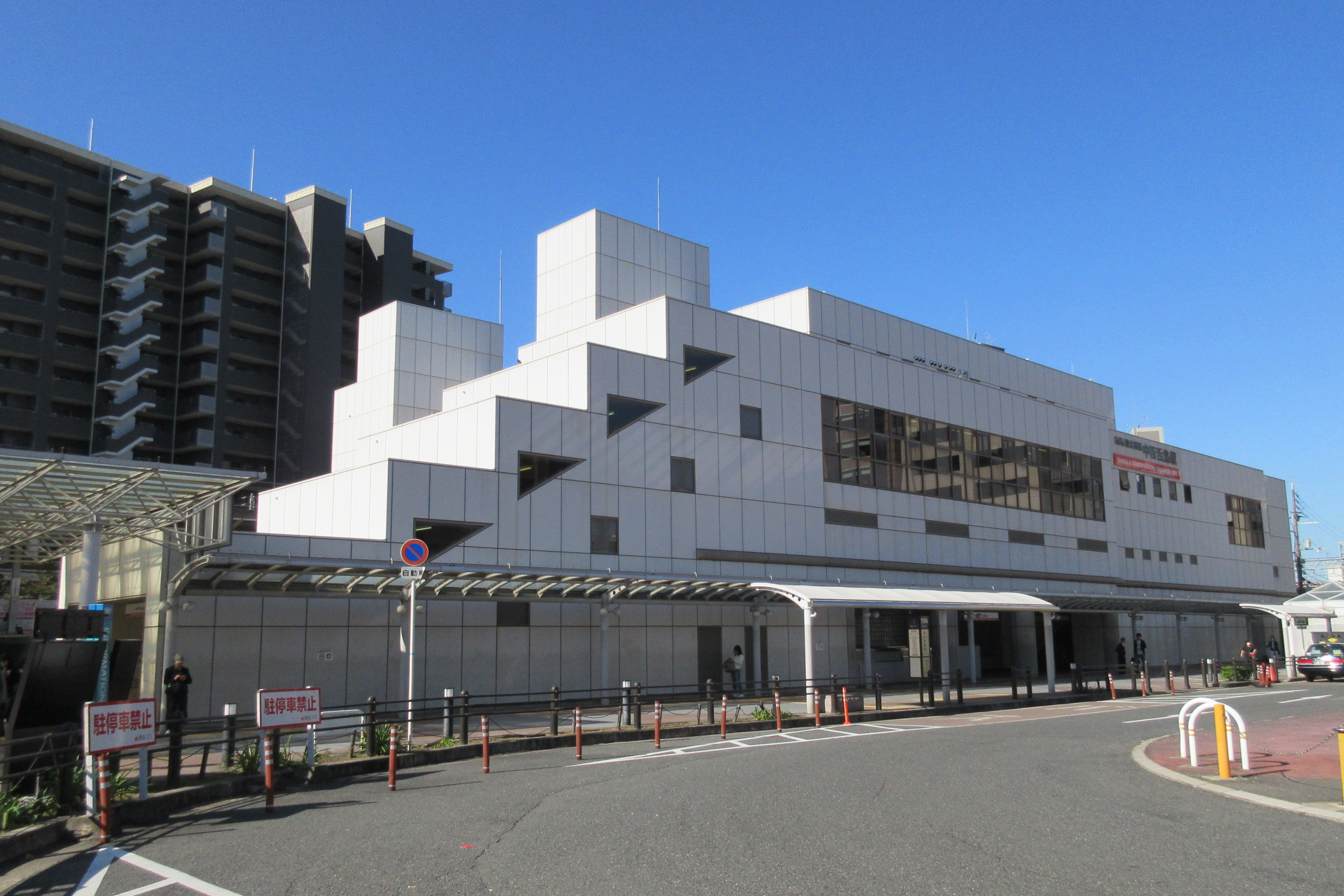
- Nankai Nakamozu station building

General information
- Location: 2-196 Nakamozu-cho, Kita-ku, Sakai-shi, Osaka-fu; Japan
- Coordinates: 34°33′22.41″N 135°30′16.07″E
- System: Nankai, Semboku
- Operator: Nankai Electric Railway
- Lines: Nankai Kōya Line; Semboku Line
- Platforms: 2 island platforms

Other information
- Station code: NK59 (Nankai)

History
- Opened: October 10,1912

Passengers
- FY2019: 24,442 (Nankai); 39,021 (Semboku) daily

Services
Preceding station	Nankai Electric Railway	Following station
Mozuhachiman (NK58) towards Namba	Kōya Line Local Semi-Express	Shirasagi (NK60) towards Gokurakubashi
Mozuhachiman (NK58) towards Namba	Kōya Line Local Semi-Express	through to Semboku Line
through to Kōya Line	Semboku Line Local Semi-Express	Fukai (NK88) towards Izumi-Chūō
Location

The above-ground Nakamozu Station has two island platforms serving four tracks, with an elevated station building. The outer tracks are used for the Kōya Line and the inner ones are for Semboku. A reversing track for Semboku is located in the west of the platforms and between 2 tracks for the Kōya Line.

=== Platforms ===
1	■ Nankai Railway Kōya Line	for Koyasan
2	■ Semboku Rapid Railway	for Izumi-Chūō
3	■ Nankai Railway Kōya Line	from Semboku Rapid Railway for Namba
4	■ Nankai Railway Kōya Line	from Kitanoda for Namba

=== Osaka Metro Midosuji Line ===
Nakamozu Station なかもず駅
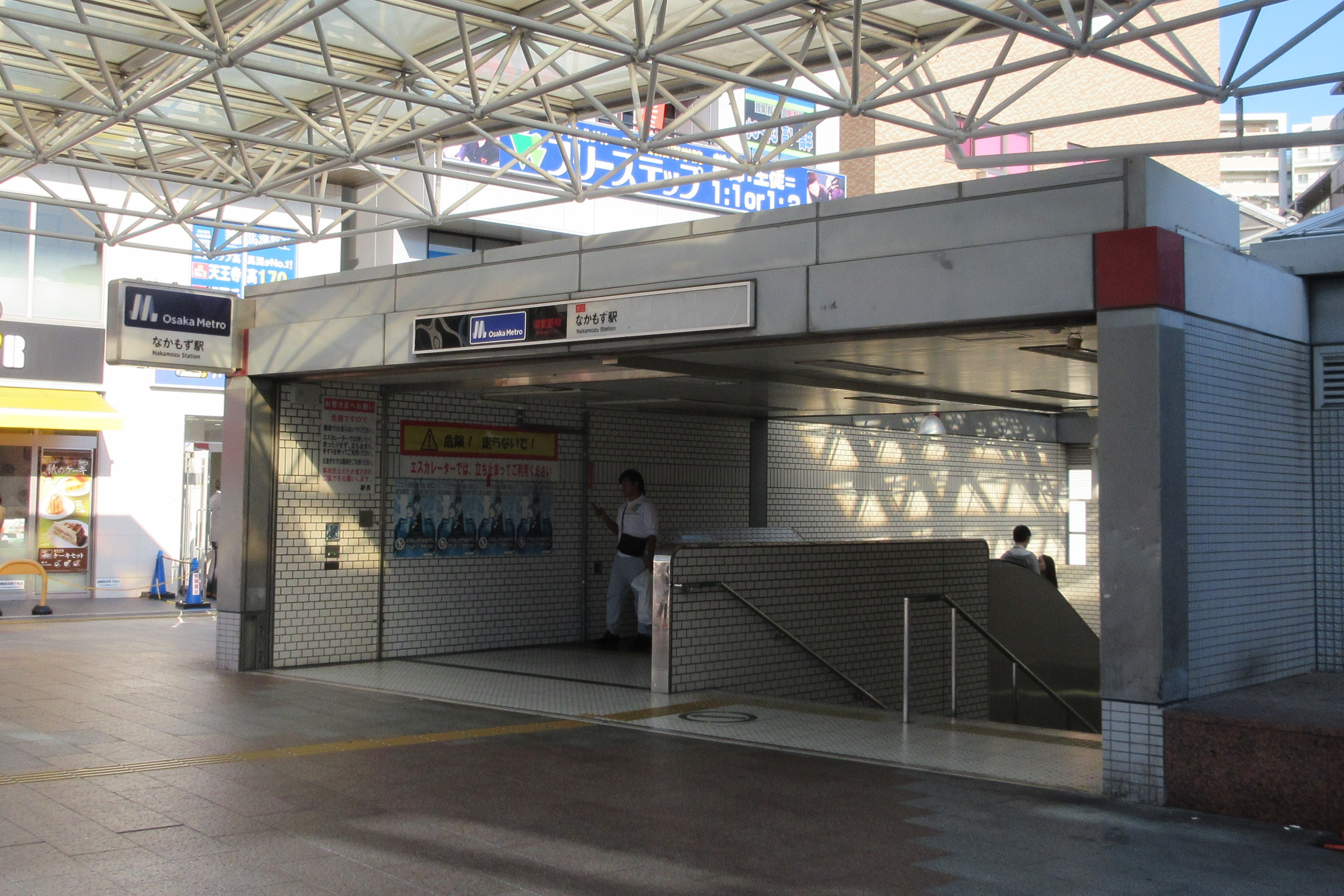
- Osaka Metro Nakamozu Station

General information
- Location: 2-240-1 Nakamozu-cho, Kita-ku, Sakai-shi, Osaka-fu; Japan
- Coordinates: 34°33′21.77″N 135°30′20.89″E
- System: Osaka Metro
- Operator: Osaka Metro
- Line: Midōsuji Line
- Platforms: 1 island platform

Other information
- Station code: M 30

History
- Opened: 18 April 1987; 39 years ago

Passengers
- Fiscal 2019: 76,151 daily

Services
Preceding station	Osaka Metro	Following station
Shinkanaoka M 29 towards Esaka	Midōsuji Line	Terminus
Location

The Osaka Municipal Subway station has an underground island platform serving two tracks. It is the southernmost station on the Osaka Metro, as well as on the island of Honshu.

=== Platform ===
1, 2	■ Midōsuji Line	for Tennoji, Namba, Umeda, Shin-Osaka, Esaka and Minoh-kayano

== History ==
The Koya Line station opened on October 10, 1912, on a site 170 m away from its present location. The station was relocated to its current over-track position on November 23, 1970. The Semboku Rapid Railway Line opened on April 1, 1971, sharing facilities with the existing Koya Line station at Nakamozu. Nankai merged with Semboku Rapid Railway on March 31, 2025.

In 1971, the station was designated as the terminus of an extension of the Sakaisuji Line of the Osaka City Subway, but this plan was later changed after the Sakai city government requested an extension of the Midosuji Line instead. The Midosuji Line station opened on April 18, 1987 when the line was extended from its previous southern terminus at Abiko Station. The facilities of the Midosuji Line were inherited by Osaka Metro after the privatization of the Osaka Municipal Transportation Bureau on 1 April 2018.

The surrounding area was redeveloped from the mid-1980s and was slated to house a major department store around that time; however, the collapse of the Japanese asset price bubble led to these plans never materializing. Since then, the area has seen a number of office building and condominium construction projects.

== Passenger statistics ==
In fiscal 2019, the Nankai portion of the station was used by an average of 24,442 passengers daily, the Senboku portion of the station by 39,021 passengers daily and the Osaka Metro by 76,151 passengers daily. Osaka Metro ridership declined in 2016 when Nankai and Semboku implemented discounted transfer pricing, and again in 2025 when the two lines merged under the same operator and adopted a unified fare schedule.

== Surrounding area ==
- Sakai Chamber of Commerce
- Osaka Prefecture University Nakamozu Campus

== See also ==
- List of railway stations in Japan
