= Naka-ku, Sakai =

Ward of Sakai, Osaka Prefecture, Japan

Coordinates: 34°31′42.02″N 135°29′55.08″E

Map

Naka-ku in the city

Naka-ku (中区) is a ward of the city of Sakai in Osaka Prefecture, Japan. The ward has an area of 17.94 km^{2} and a population of 121,377. The population density is 6,766 per square kilometer. The name means "Central Ward."

The wards of Sakai were established when Sakai became a city designated by government ordinance on April 1, 2006.
