= Izumi-Chūō Station (Osaka) =

Railway station in Izumi, Osaka Prefecture, Japan

Izumi-Chūō Station 和泉中央駅
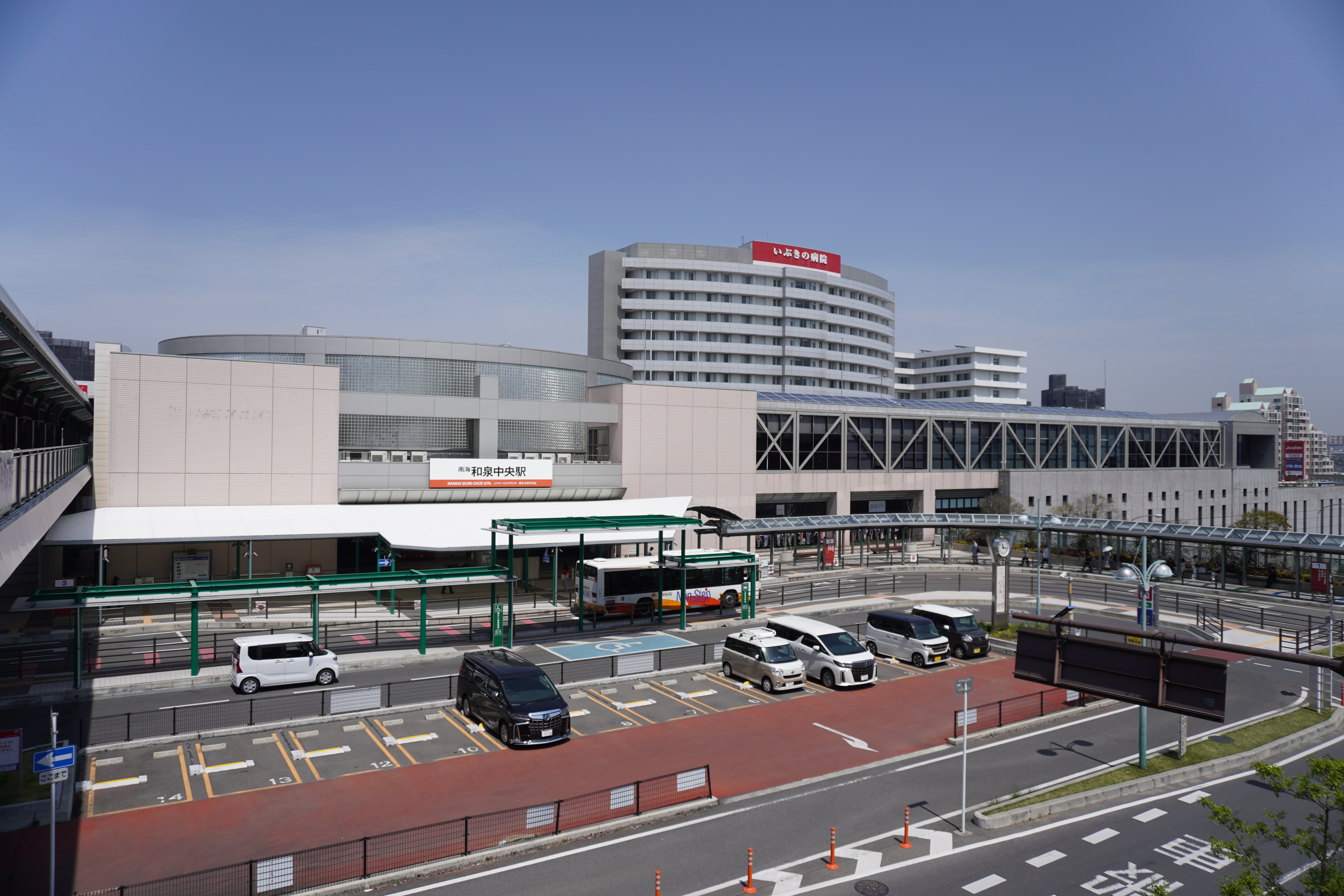
- Izumi-Chūō Station in April 2025

General information
- Location: 1-1, Ibukino 5-chōme, Izumi-shi, Osaka-fu 594-0041; Japan
- Coordinates: 34°27′41″N 135°27′22″E
- Operator: Nankai Electric Railway
- Line: Semboku Line
- Distance: 14.3 km (8.9 miles) from Nakamozu
- Platforms: 1 island platform
- Connections: Bus terminal

Other information
- Status: Staffed
- Station code: NK92
- Website: Official website

History
- Opened: 1 April 1995

Passengers
- FY2019: 33,095 daily

Services
Preceding station	Nankai Electric Railway	Following station
Kōmyōike towards Nakamozu	Semboku Line Local	Terminus
Kōmyōike towards Namba	Semboku Line Semi-Express Sub. Express	Terminus
Kōmyōike towards Namba	Semboku Liner	Terminus
Location
- Location within Osaka Prefecture Location within Japan

Izumi-Chūō Station (和泉中央駅, Izumi-Chūō-eki) is a passenger railway station located in the city of Izumi, Osaka Prefecture, Japan, operated by Nankai Electric Railway.

== Lines ==
Izumi-Chūō Station is served by the Semboku Line, and is located 14.3 kilometers from the opposing terminus of the line at Nakamozu and 27.5 kilometers from Namba.

== Station layout ==
The station consists of one island platform with an elevated station building.

=== Platforms ===
1, 2	■ Semboku Line	for Nakamozu (■ Koya Line) Sakaihigashi and Namba

== History ==
Izumi-Chūō Station opened on 1 April 1995 on the Semboku Rapid Railway.

On 1 April 2025, this station came under the aegis of Nankai Electric Railway as the result of the buyout of the Semboku Rapid Railway.

== Passenger statistics ==
In fiscal 2019, the station was used by an average of 33,095 passengers daily (boarding passengers only).

== Surrounding area ==
- Izumi City Plaza
- Izumi City History Museum
- St. Andrew's University
- Izumi City Kitaikeda Junior High School

== See also ==
- List of railway stations in Japan
