= Southern (Nankai Electric Railway train) =

Japanese limited express train service

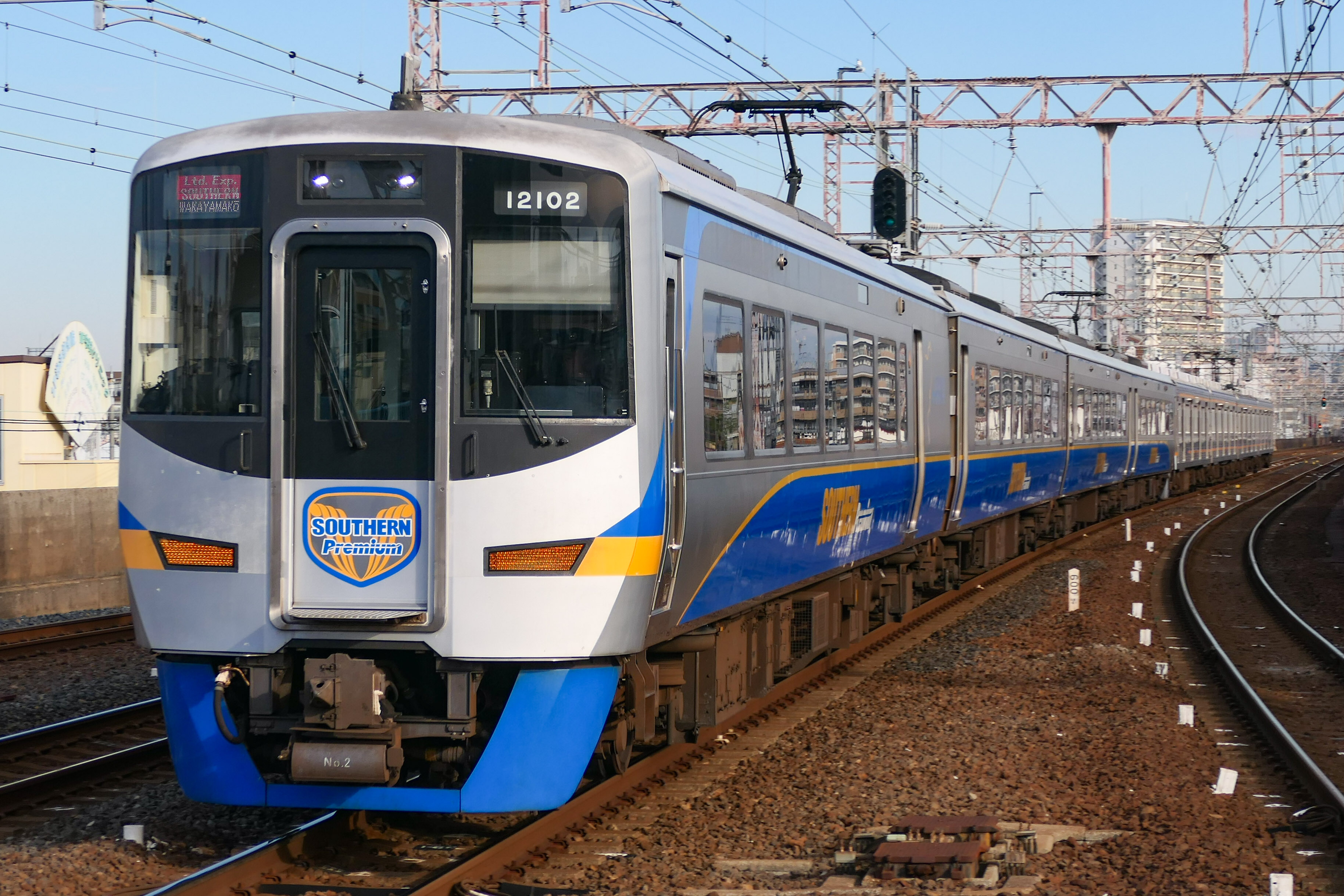
- Nankai 12000 series leading a Southern service, December 2024

Overview
- Service type: Limited express
- Status: Operational
- Predecessor: Shikoku
- First service: 1 November 1985
- Current operator: Nankai Electric Railway

Route
- Termini: Namba; Wakayamashi or Wakayamakō
- Service frequency: 34 return workings daily
- Lines used: Nankai Main Line; Wakayamakō Line

Technical
- Rolling stock: 10000 series, 7100 series (Southern); 12000 series, 8000 series, 8300 series, 9000 series (Southern Premium)

The Southern (Japanese: サザン) is a limited express train service operated by the private railway operator Nankai Electric Railway in Japan. Introduced in 1985 as a successor to the Shikoku limited express, most trains run between Namba and Wakayamashi stations on the Nankai Main Line. Some trains operate further to or from Wakayamakō Station on the Wakayamakō Line.

== History ==
The Southern debuted on 1 November 1985, replacing the Shikoku limited express. The service was operated using 2-car Nankai 10000 series sets, which operated in multiple with 4-car 7100 series commuter trainsets for non-reserved accommodation or using pairs of 10000 series sets, which only offered reserved seating. In 1986, the 10000 series became Nankai's first train type to receive the Laurel Prize, presented by the Japan Railfan Club. Ten 10000 series sets had been built by 1989. From 1992, the 10000 series fleet was augmented to 4-car formations.

New 12000 series trainsets, branded Southern Premium (サザンプレミアム), debuted on the service on 1 September 2011. Their introduction allowed for all Southern services to offer reserved seating. They have operated in multiple with 8000, 8300, and 9000 series trainsets for non-reserved accommodation.

With the 18 October 2014 timetable revision, Wakayamadaigakumae Station was added to the Southern's stopping pattern.

== Service pattern ==
The Southern operates between Namba and Wakayamashi or Wakayamakō stations. As of 21 December 2024, 34 return workings are operated daily. On weekdays, 31 trains operate between Namba and Wakayamashi, and 3 operate between Namba and Wakayamakō on the Wakayamakō Line. On weekends and holidays, 32 trains operate between Namba and Wakayamashi, and 2 operate between Namba and Wakayamakō.

Station	Japanese
Namba	なんば
Shin-Imamiya	新今宮
Tengachaya	天下茶
Sakai	屋
Kishiwada	堺岸和
Izumisano	田泉佐
Ozaki	野尾
Misaki-kōen	崎みさき公園
Wakayamadaigakumae	和歌山大学前
Wakayamashi	和歌山市
Wakayamakō	和歌山港
