= Nankai 12000 series =

Japanese electric multiple unit train type

Nankai/Semboku 12000 series
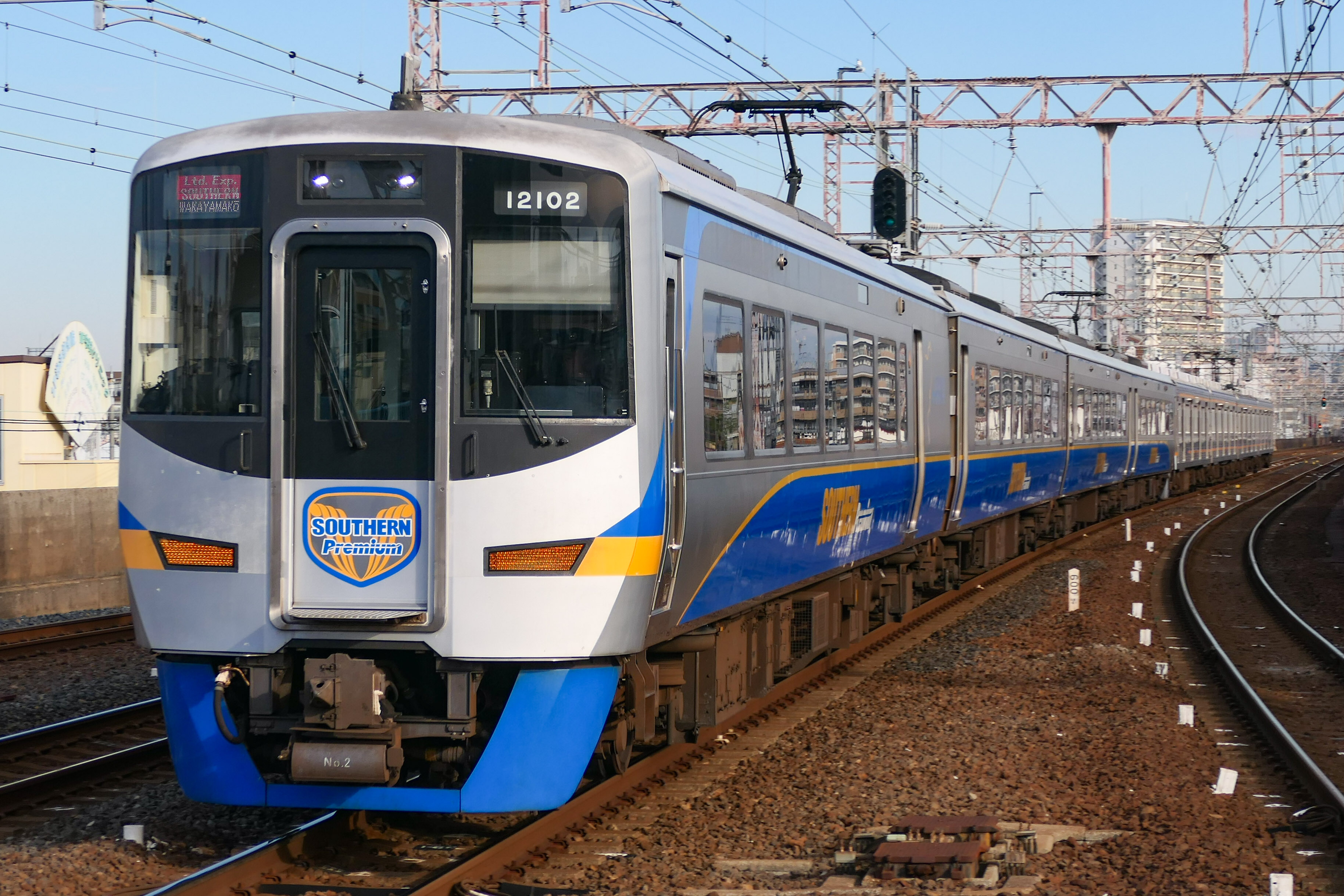
- A Nankai 12000 series set on a Southern service in December 2024
- Stock type: Electric multiple unit
- In service: 1 September 2011 – present
- Manufacturers: Tokyu Car Corporation; J-TREC (Semboku)
- Built at: Yokohama
- Replaced: Nankai 10000 series
- Constructed: 2011, 2016
- Number built: 12 vehicles (3 sets)
- Number in service: 12 vehicles (3 sets)
- Formation: 4 cars per trainset
- Fleet numbers: 12001–12002, 12021
- Capacity: 242
- Operators: Nankai Electric Railway; Semboku Rapid Railway (2017–2025)
- Depot: Suminoe
- Lines served: Nankai Main Line; Wakayamakō Line; Kōya Line; Semboku Line

Specifications
- Car body construction: Stainless steel
- Car length: 20,765 mm (68 ft 2 in) (end cars); 20,665 mm (67 ft 10 in) (intermediate cars)
- Width: 2,820 mm (9 ft 3 in)
- Height: 4,140 mm (13 ft 7 in)
- Floor height: 1,150 mm (3 ft 9 in)
- Maximum speed: 120 km/h (75 mph)
- Traction system: Variable-frequency
- Traction motors: Three-phase AC (4 per motor car); MB-5091-A2 (Nankai); MB-5091-A3 (Semboku)
- Power output: 1,440 kW per 4-car set
- Acceleration: 2.5 km/h/s
- Deceleration: 3.7 km/h/s (service); 4.0 km/h/s (emergency)
- Electric systems: 1,500 V DC (overhead wire)
- Current collection: Pantograph
- Bogies: SS177M (motored); SS177T (trailer)
- Multiple working: 8000 series; 8300 series; 9000 series
- Track gauge: 1,067 mm (3 ft 6 in)

The Nankai 12000 series (南海12000系, Nankai 12000-kei) is an electric multiple unit (EMU) train type operated by the private railway operator Nankai Electric Railway in Japan on Southern Premium limited express services since September 2011. Two 4-car trainsets were delivered, replacing the older 10000 series sets.

The Semboku 12000 series (泉北12000系, Senboku 12000-kei) is a very similar train type, introduced by the private railway operator Semboku Rapid Railway, a former Nankai subsidiary, for use on Semboku Liner limited express services in Osaka Prefecture. One 4-car trainset was delivered in 2016 and entered revenue service on 27 January 2017.

== Design ==
The new trains feature "Plasmacluster" air-purification technology developed by Sharp Corporation, representing the first use in a private operator (i.e. non-JR) train in Japan.

Passenger seats are 460 mm (18 in) wide, 25 mm (0.98 in) wider than in previous trains, and AC power outlets are provided.

The Semboku 12000 series is similar, but sports a gold livery and has different coloured seat covers in each of the four cars.

== Operations ==
The Nankai 12000 series is primarily used on Southern limited express services operating between Namba on the Nankai Main Line and Wakayamakō or Wakayamashi on the Wakayamakō Line. Its introduction allowed for all Southern services to offer reserved seating.

The Semboku 12000 series was developed for use on Semboku Liner limited express services operating between Namba and Izumi-Chūō, via the Nankai Main Line, Kōya Line, and Semboku Line (Semboku Rapid Railway Line prior to April 2025).

The two train types are also able to operate interchangeably when needed.

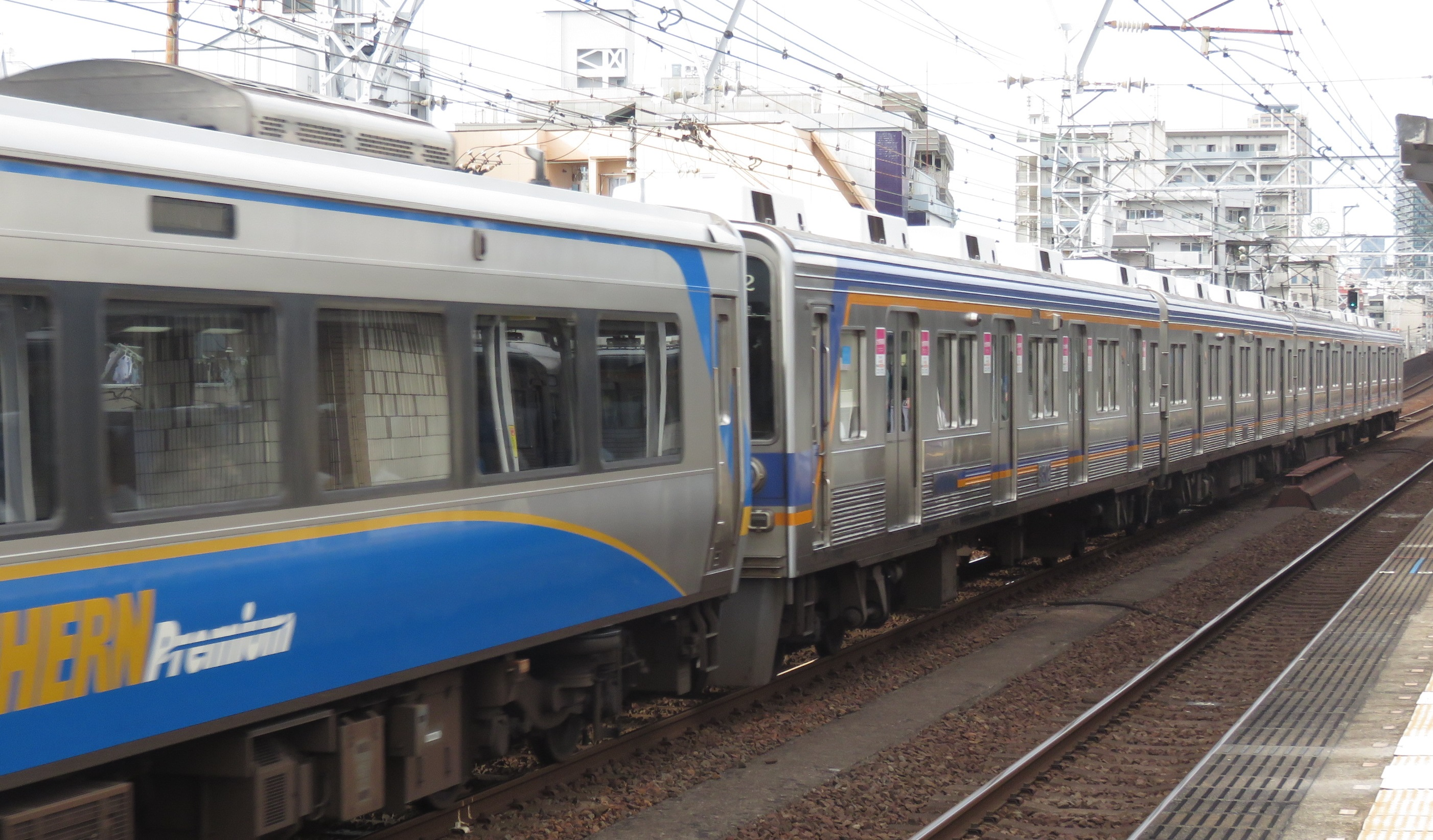
A 12000 series coupled with a 9000 series set on a Southern service in September 2016

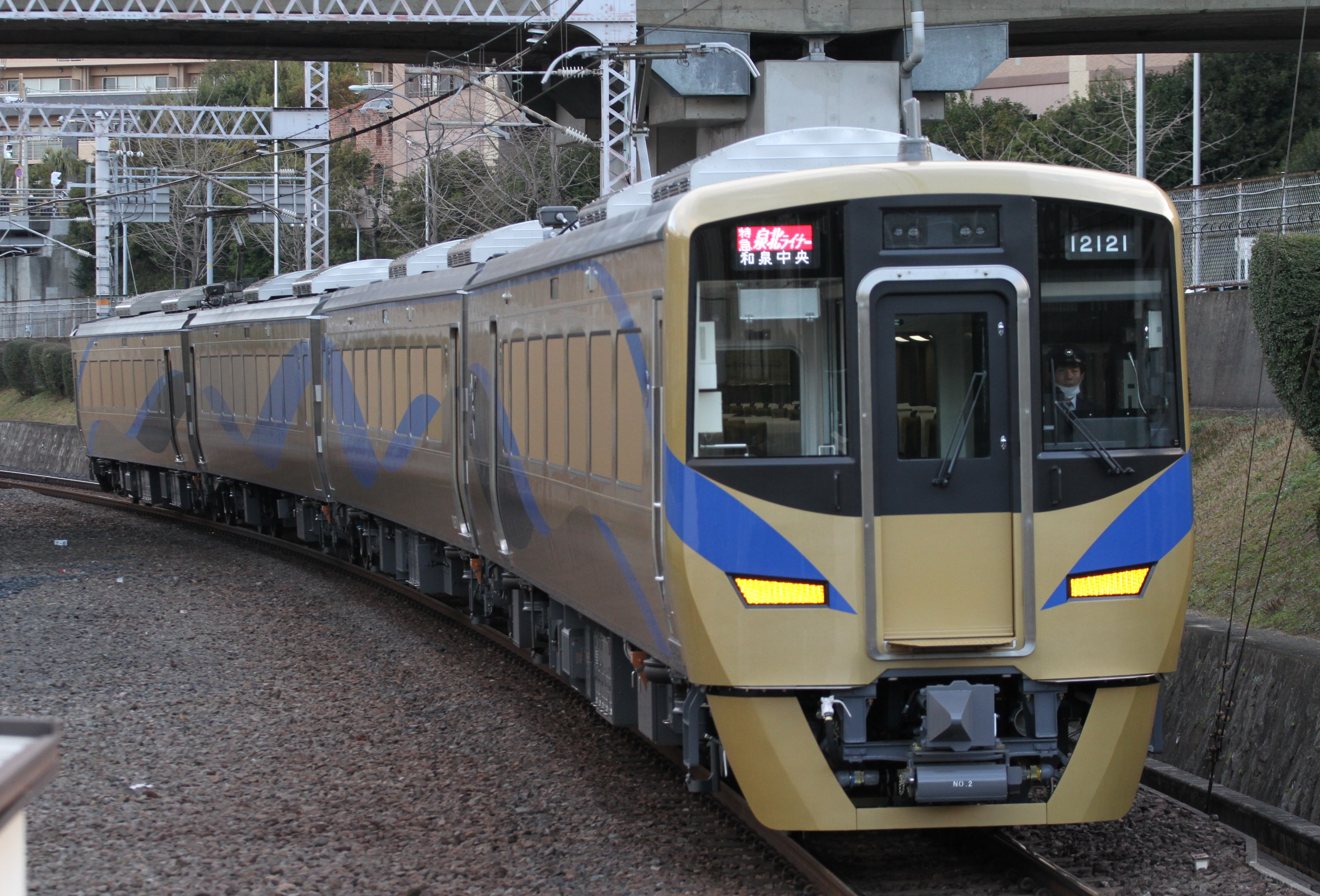
Set 12021 on a Semboku Liner service in February 2017

== Formation ==
As of 1 April 2016, the fleet consists of two four-car sets, formed as follows, with two motored ("M") cars and two non-powered intermediate trailer ("T") cars, and car 1 at the Wakayamashi end.

| Car No. | 1 | 2 | 3 | 4 |
|---|---|---|---|---|
| Designation | Mc2 | T2 | T1 | Mc1 |
| Numbering | MoHa 1210x | SaHa 1285x | SaHa 1280x | MoHa 1200x |
| Weight (t) | 40.5 | 32.0 | 30.5 | 41.5 |
| Seating capacity | 50 | 64 | 68 | 60 |

The two end cars are each fitted with one PT7144-B single-arm pantograph.

The sole Semboku 12000 series set is formed similarly, with car 1 at the Izumi-Chuo end.

| Car No. | 1 | 2 | 3 | 4 |
|---|---|---|---|---|
| Designation | Mc2 | T2 | T1 | Mc1 |
| Numbering | MoHa 12121 | SaHa 12871 | SaHa 12821 | MoHa 12021 |
| Weight (t) | 40.5 | 32.0 | 30.5 | 41.5 |
| Seating capacity | 50 | 64 | 68 | 60 |

Cars 1 and 4 each have one PT7144-B2 single-arm pantograph.

== Interior ==
Passenger accommodation consists of 2+2-abreast unidirectional seating with blue seat covers. Car 1 has a wheelchair space and also toilet facilities, including a urinal, a women-only toilet, a universal access toilet, and a washing area. Fluorescent lighting is used.

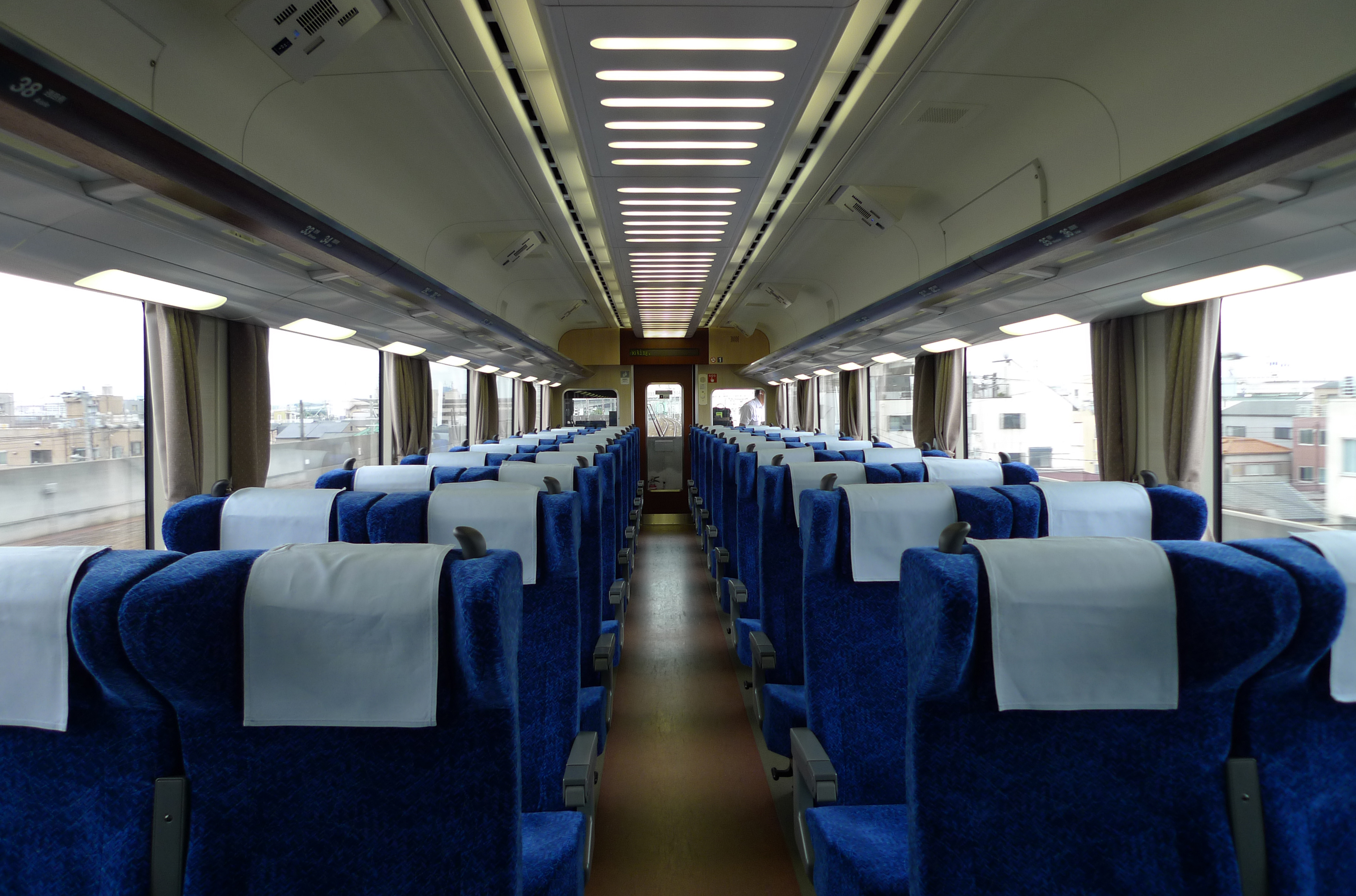
The train interior in April 2012

For the Semboku 12000 series, each car has different colour seats, with red, green, purple, and yellow seat covers. LED lighting is used, and passenger information displays provide information in four languages.

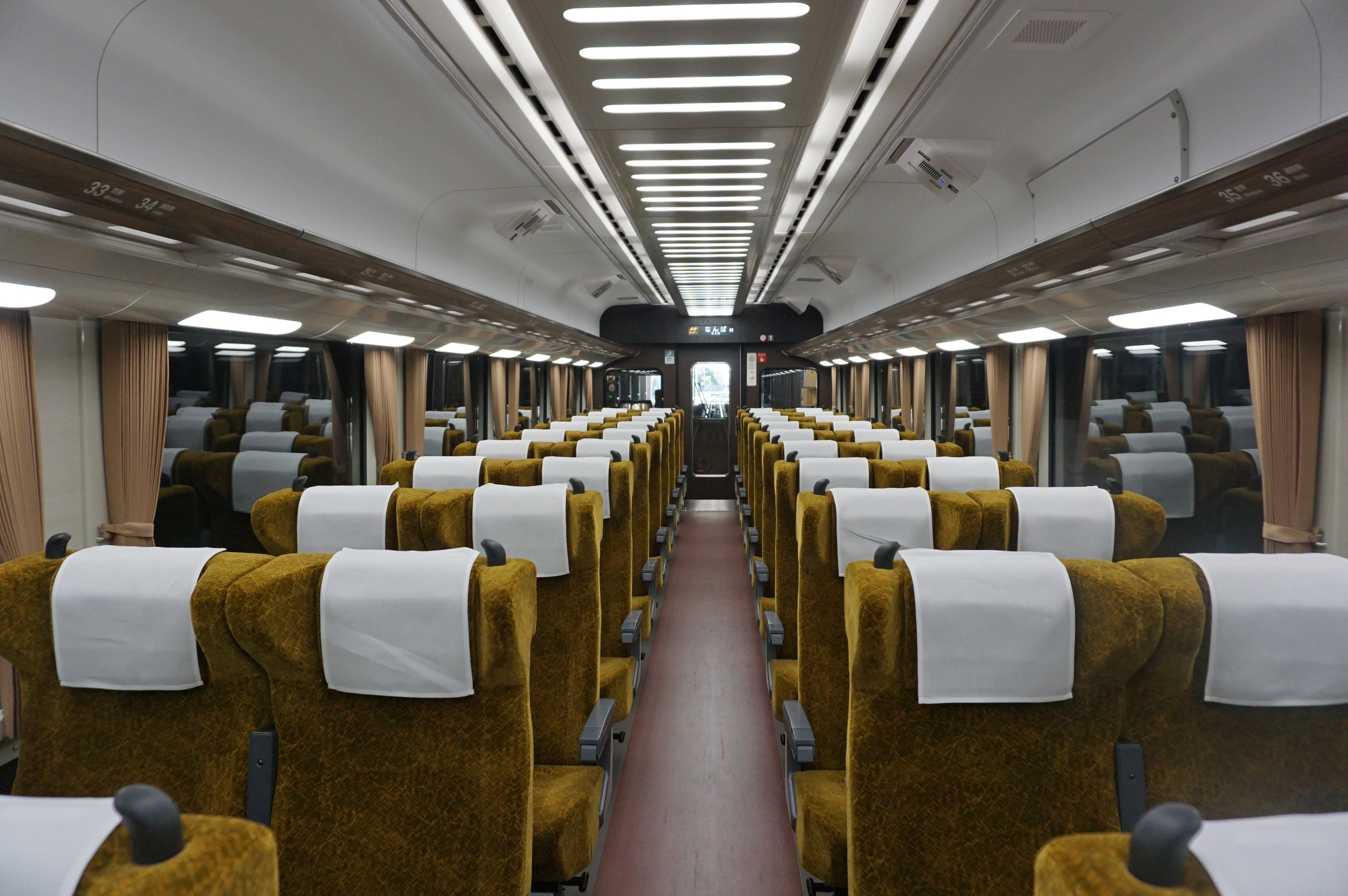
The interior of car 1 (gold-coloured seats)

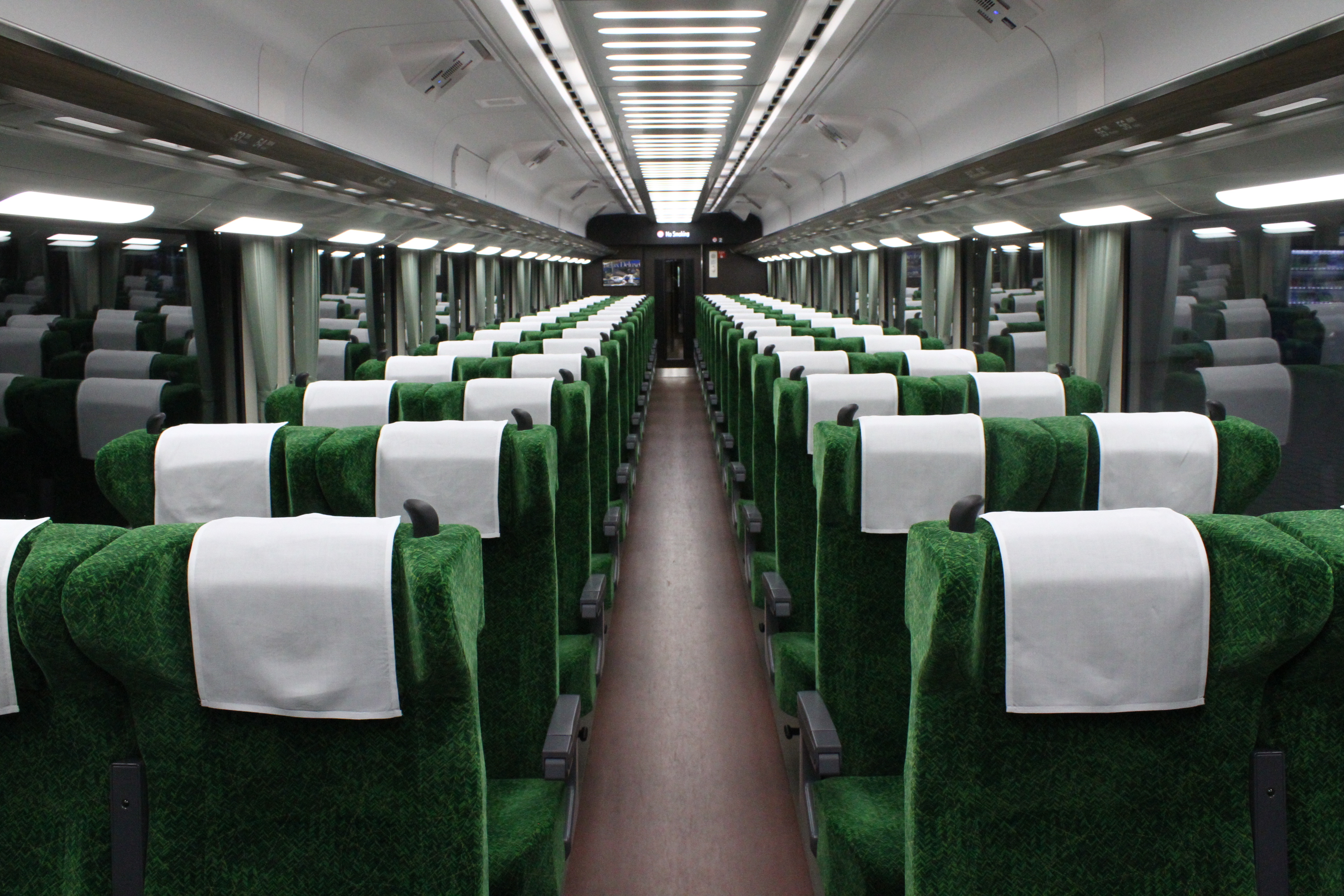
The interior of car 2 (green-coloured seats)

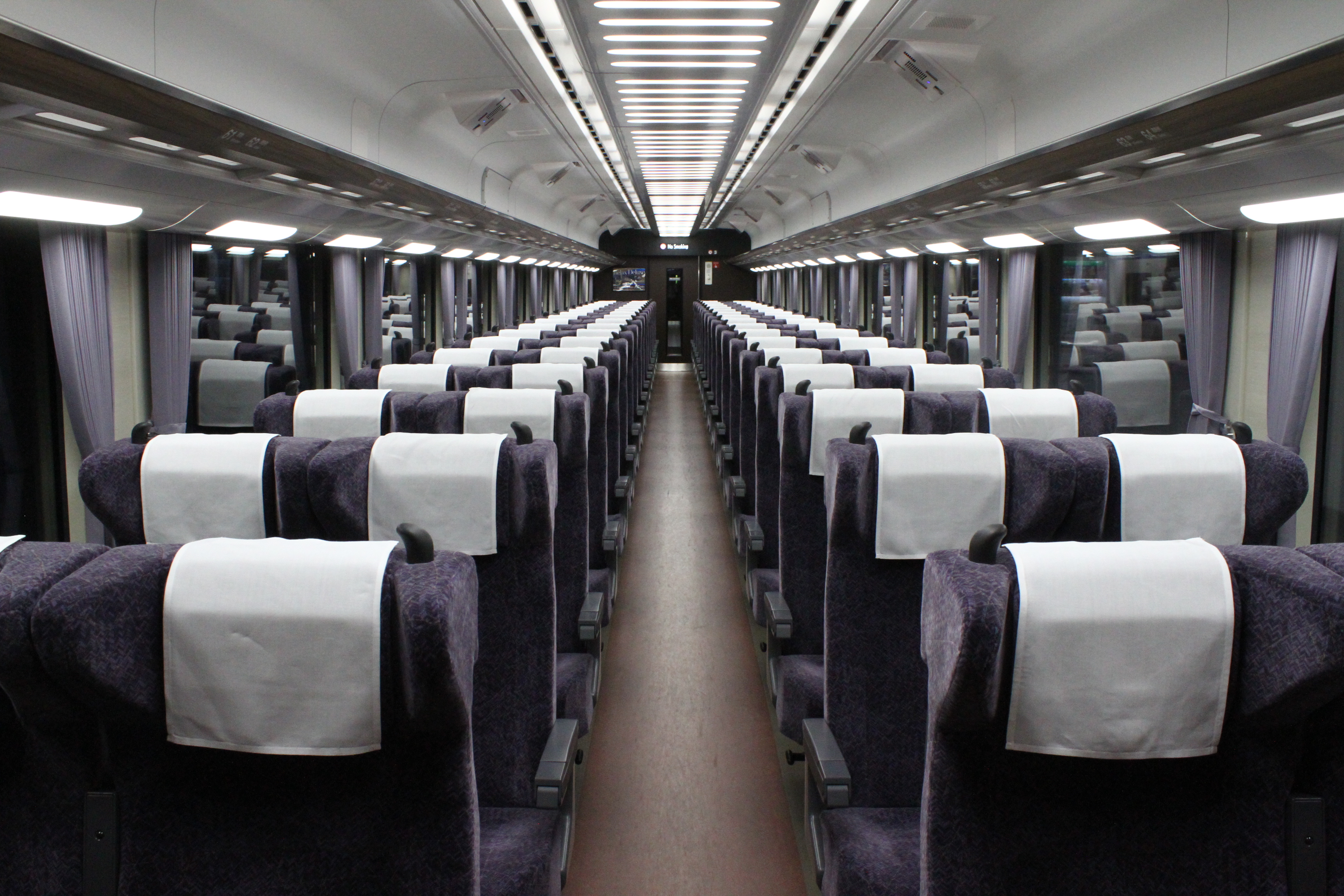
The interior of car 3 (purple-coloured seats)

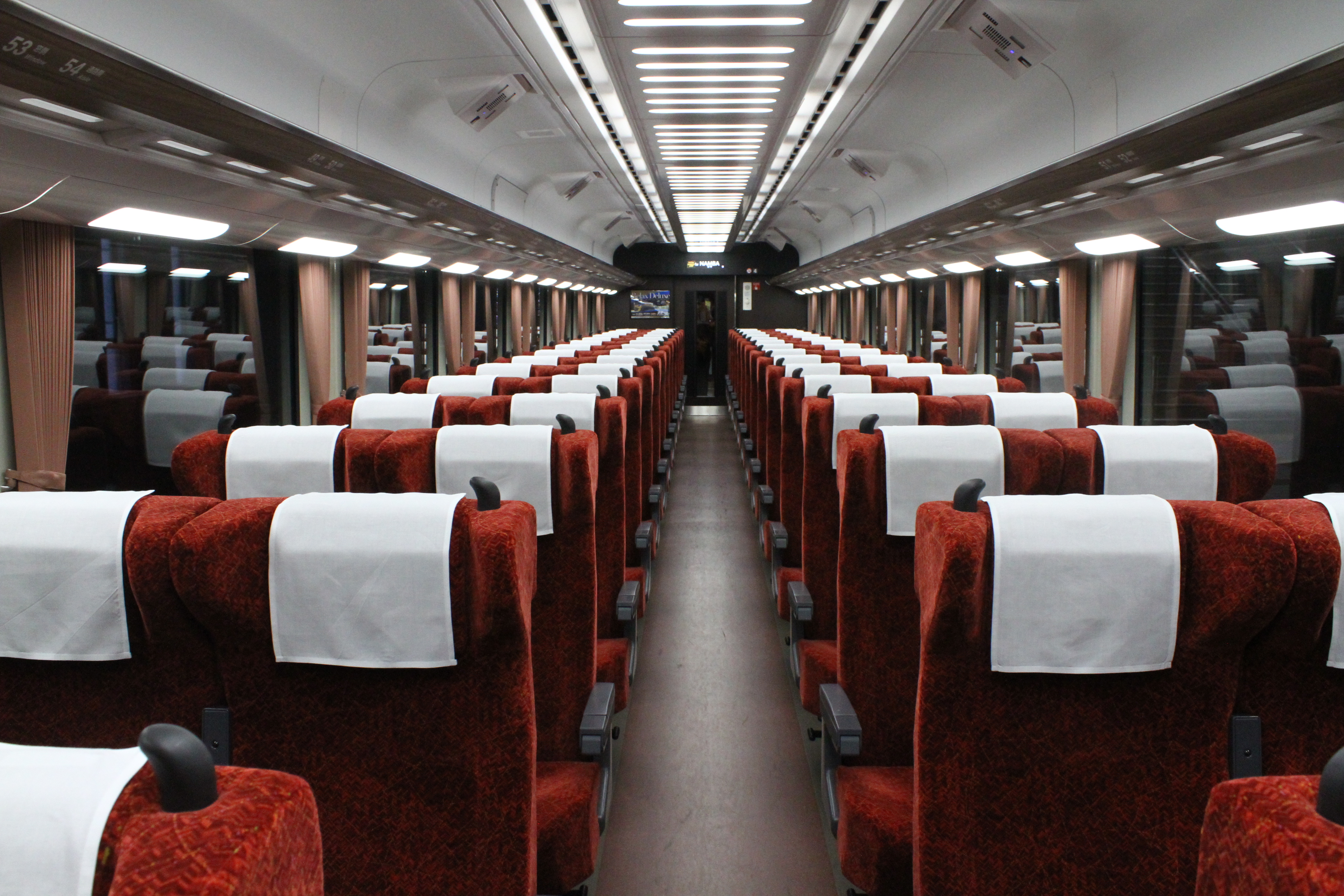
The interior of car 4 (red-coloured seats)

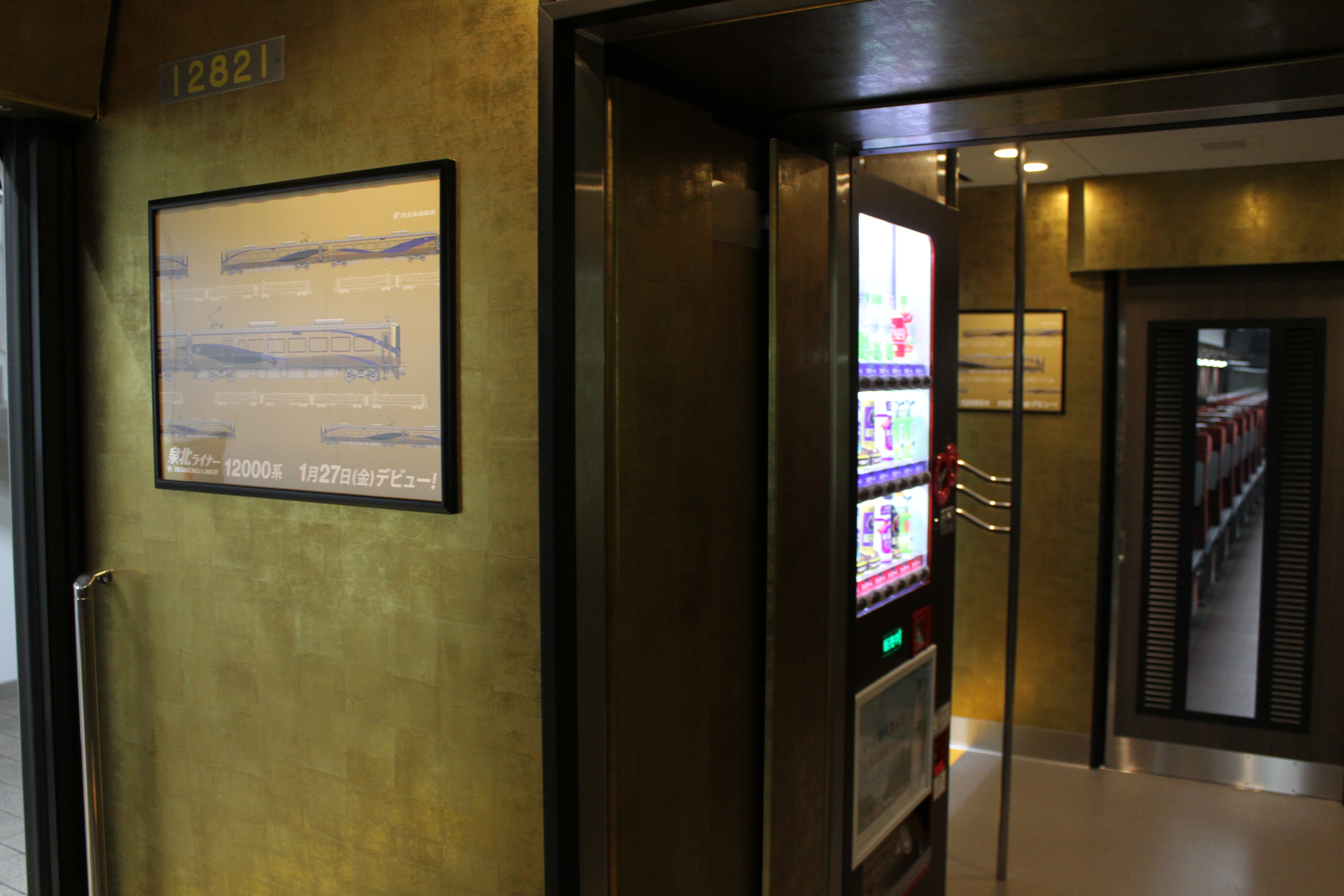
The vestibule area of car 3, with the vending machine in the adjoining car 4 visible

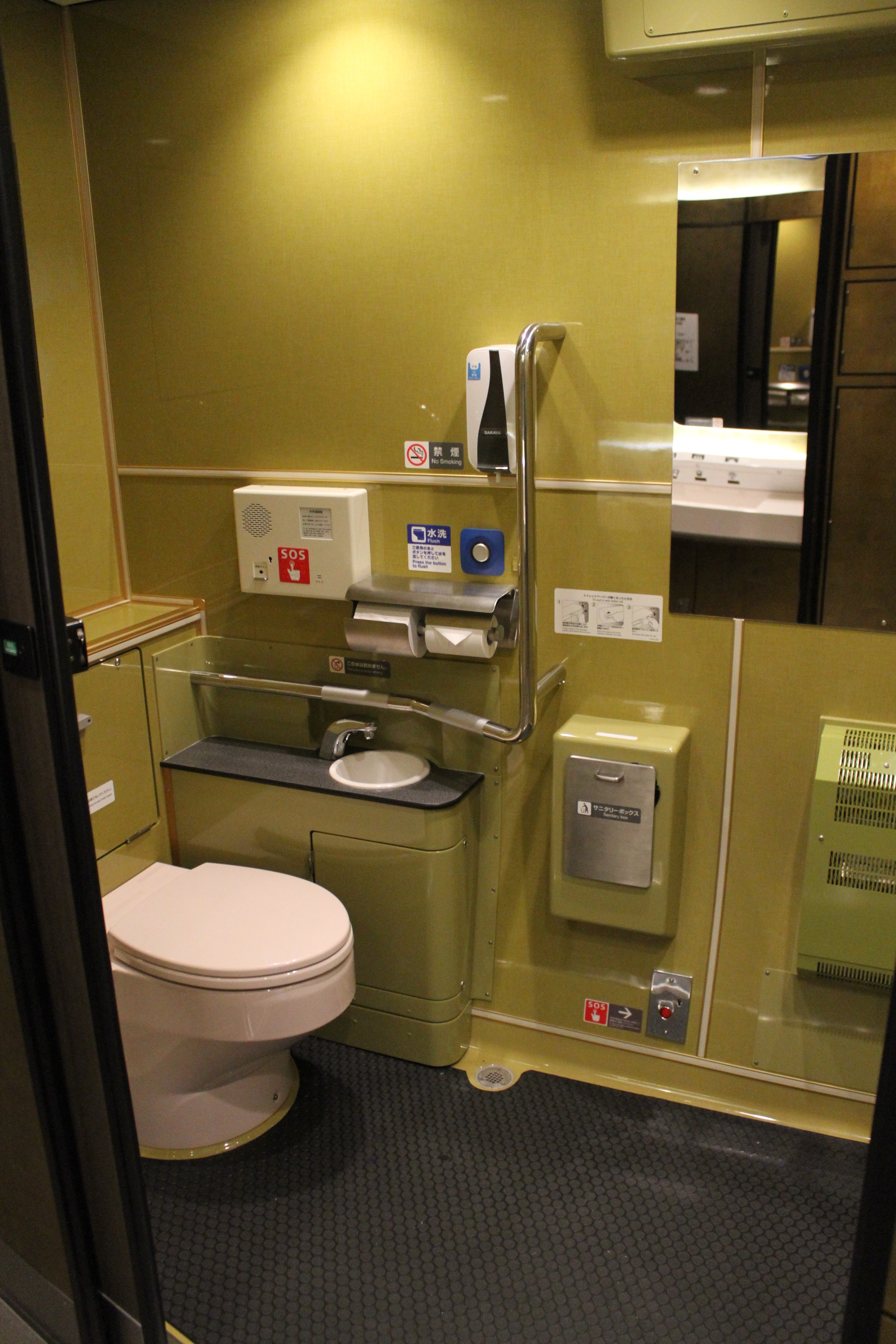
The universal access toilet in car 1

== History ==
Two four-car sets were delivered from the Tokyu Car Corporation (now Japan Transport Engineering Company) factory in Yokohama in February 2011. The trains entered service on 1 September 2011.

=== Semboku Rapid Railway ===
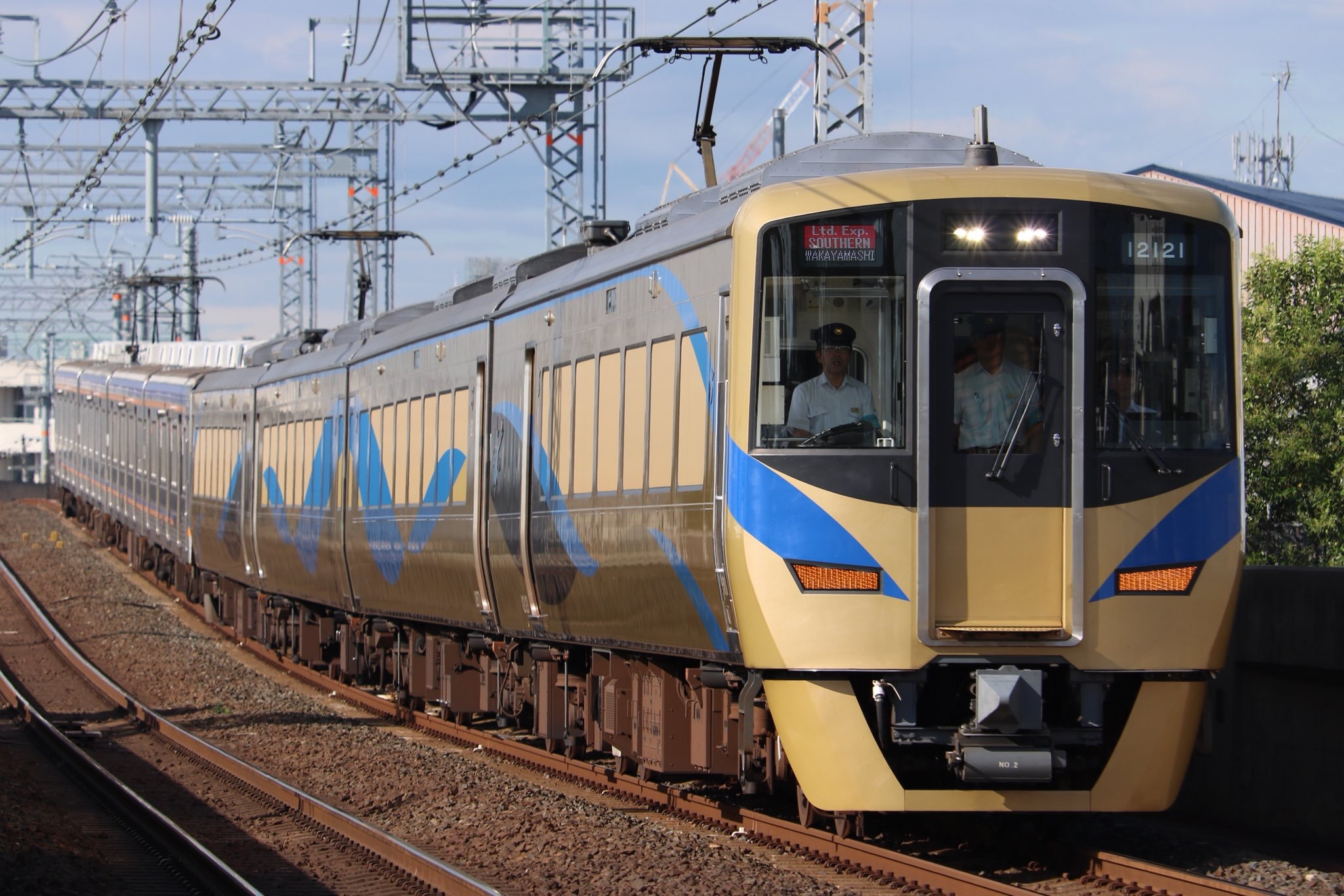
The Semboku 12000 series set in original livery, August 2018

Initial details of a new train on order for the Semboku Rapid Railway were announced in October 2016. The four-car trainset, 12021, was delivered from the J-TREC factory in Yokohama to Wakayamashi in October 2016.

On 21 January 2017, set 12021 was used on an invitation-only preview run between Kōmyōike and Namba. The trainset entered revenue service on 27 January 2017, following an official send-off ceremony at Izumi-Chūō Station.

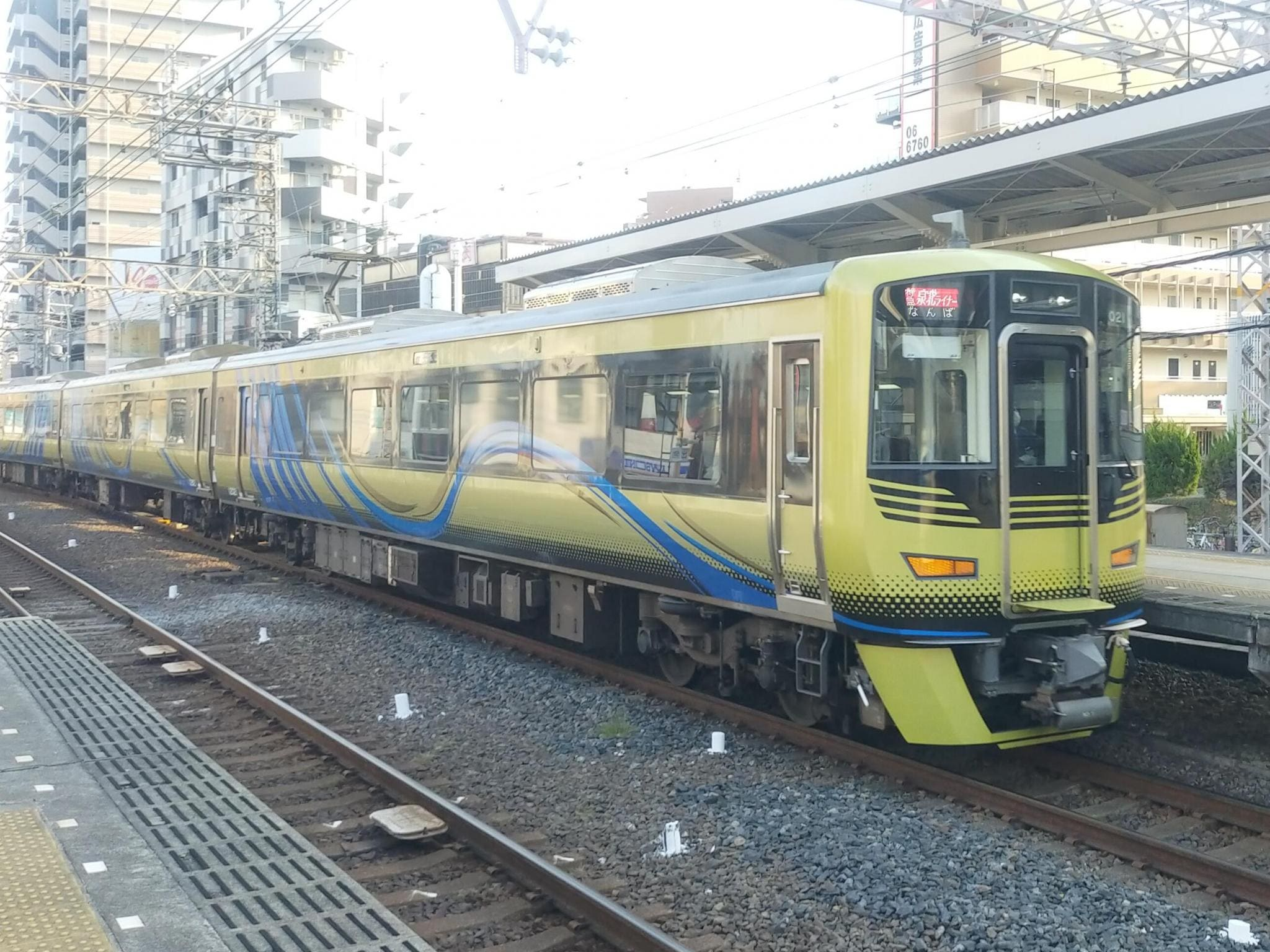
The Semboku 12000 series set in updated livery, February 2025

On 10 May 2024, Semboku announced that the 12000 series would receive a redesigned livery. It returned to service in the new livery on 30 May.

Following the merger of the Semboku Rapid Railway into its parent company on 1 April 2025, the set became property of Nankai Electric Railway.
