= 12000 series =

12000 series may refer to:

== Japanese train types ==
- Kintetsu 12000 series EMU
- Nankai 12000 series EMU
- Semboku 12000 series EMU
- Sotetsu 12000 series EMU
- Toei 12-000 series EMU
