= Nankai 9000 series =

Japanese train type

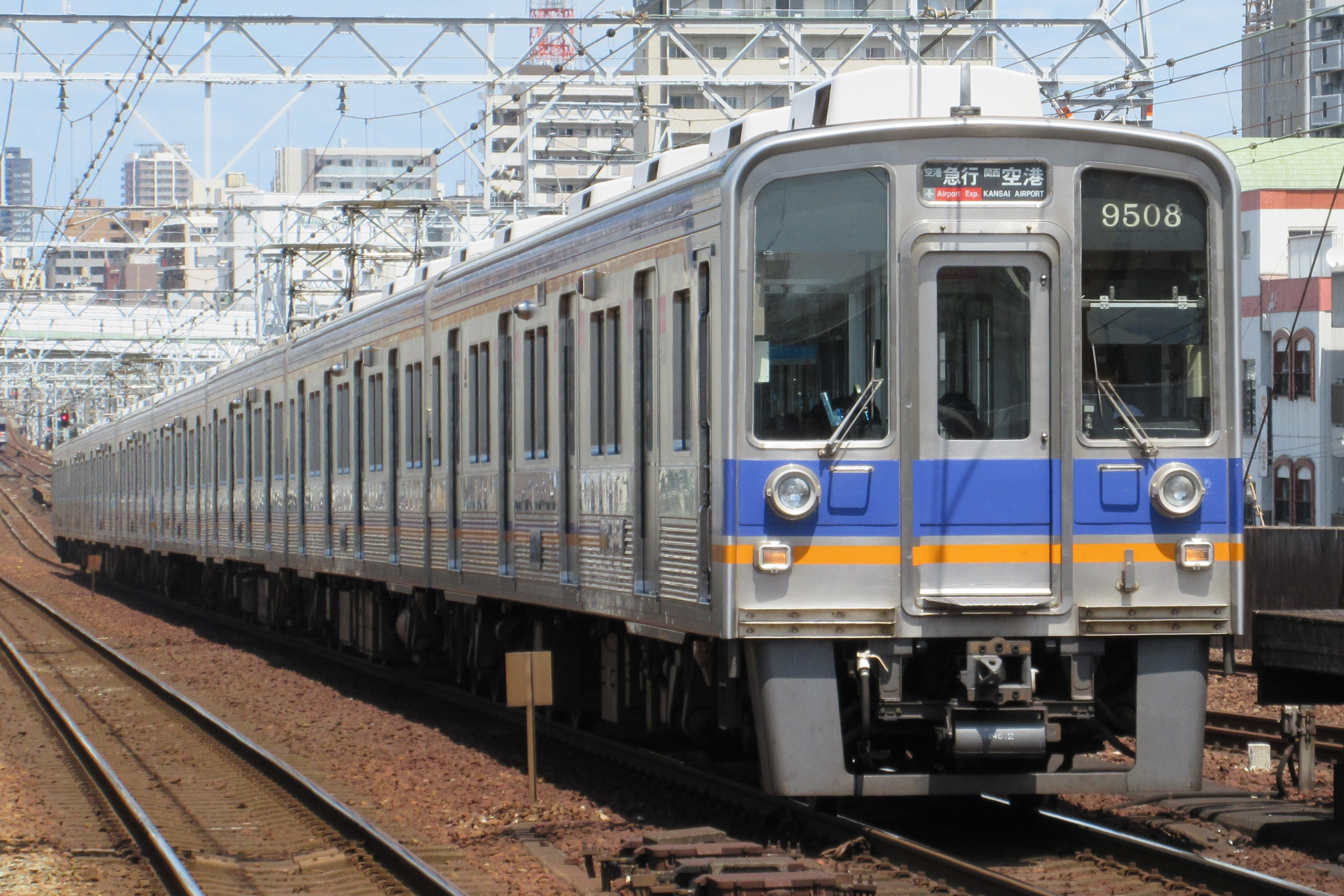
- A four-car 9000 series set in August 2015
- In service: 1985–
- Manufacturer: Tokyu Car Corporation
- Built at: Yokohama
- Constructed: 1985–1988
- Refurbished: 2019–
- Number built: 32 vehicles (7 sets)
- Number in service: 32 vehicles (7 sets)
- Formation: 4/6 cars per trainset
- Operator: Nankai Electric Railway
- Lines served: Nankai Main Line; Nankai Wakayamakō Line; Nankai Airport Line

Specifications
- Car body construction: Stainless steel
- Car length: 20,700 mm (67 ft 11 in) (intermediate cars); 20,800 mm (68 ft 3 in) (end cars)
- Doors: 4 pairs per side
- Maximum speed: 110 km/h (68 mph)
- Traction system: Resistor control + Field chopper control (as built); Variable-frequency (as refurbished)
- Electric system: 1,500 V DC
- Current collection: Overhead wire
- Multiple working: 12000 series
- Track gauge: 1,067 mm (3 ft 6 in)

The Nankai 9000 series (南海9000系) is an electric multiple unit (EMU) train type operated by the private railway operator Nankai Electric Railway in Japan since 1985.

== Operations ==
The 9000 series is used on Nankai Line commuter services singly or coupled with 12000 series EMUs on Southern Premium limited express services to provide non-reserved accommodation.

== Formations ==
As of 1 April 2015, the fleet consists of five four-car sets (9501 to 9509) and two six-car sets (9511 and 9513), formed as follows.

=== 4-car sets ===
Designation	Tc1	M1	M2	Tc2
Numbering	95xx	90xx	90xx	95xx

- The "M1" car is fitted with two scissors-type pantographs.
- The "M2" car is designated as a "mildly air-conditioned" car.

=== 6-car sets ===
Designation	Tc1	M1	M2	M1	M2	Tc2
Numbering	95xx	90xx	90xx	90xx	90xx	95xx

- The "M1" cars are fitted with two scissors-type pantographs.
- The middle "M2" car is designated as a "mildly air-conditioned" car.

== History ==
The first sets entered service in 1985.

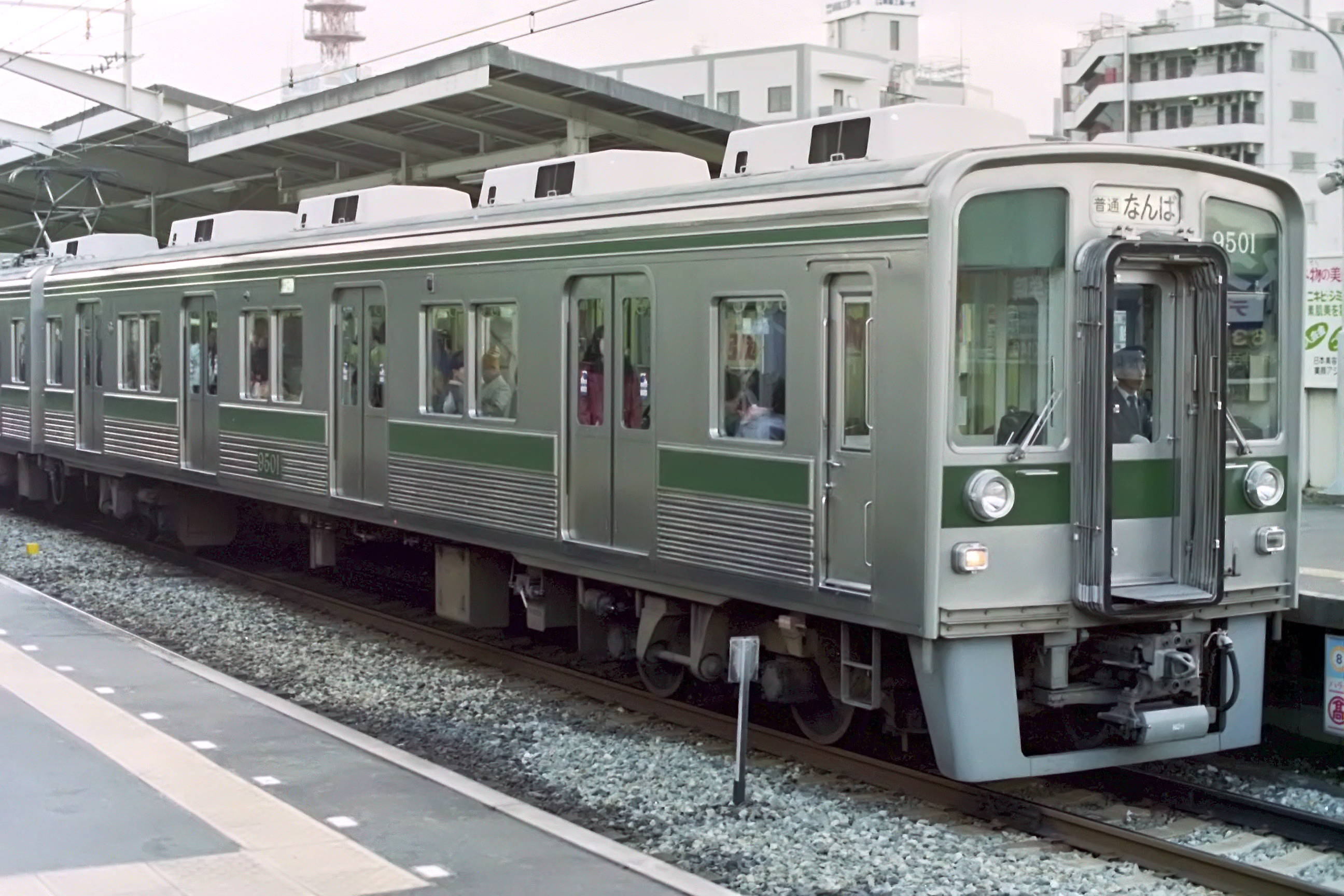
Four-car set 9501 in original livery in 1993

From 10 December 2015, four-car sets began operating in multiple with 12000 series sets on Southern limited express services.

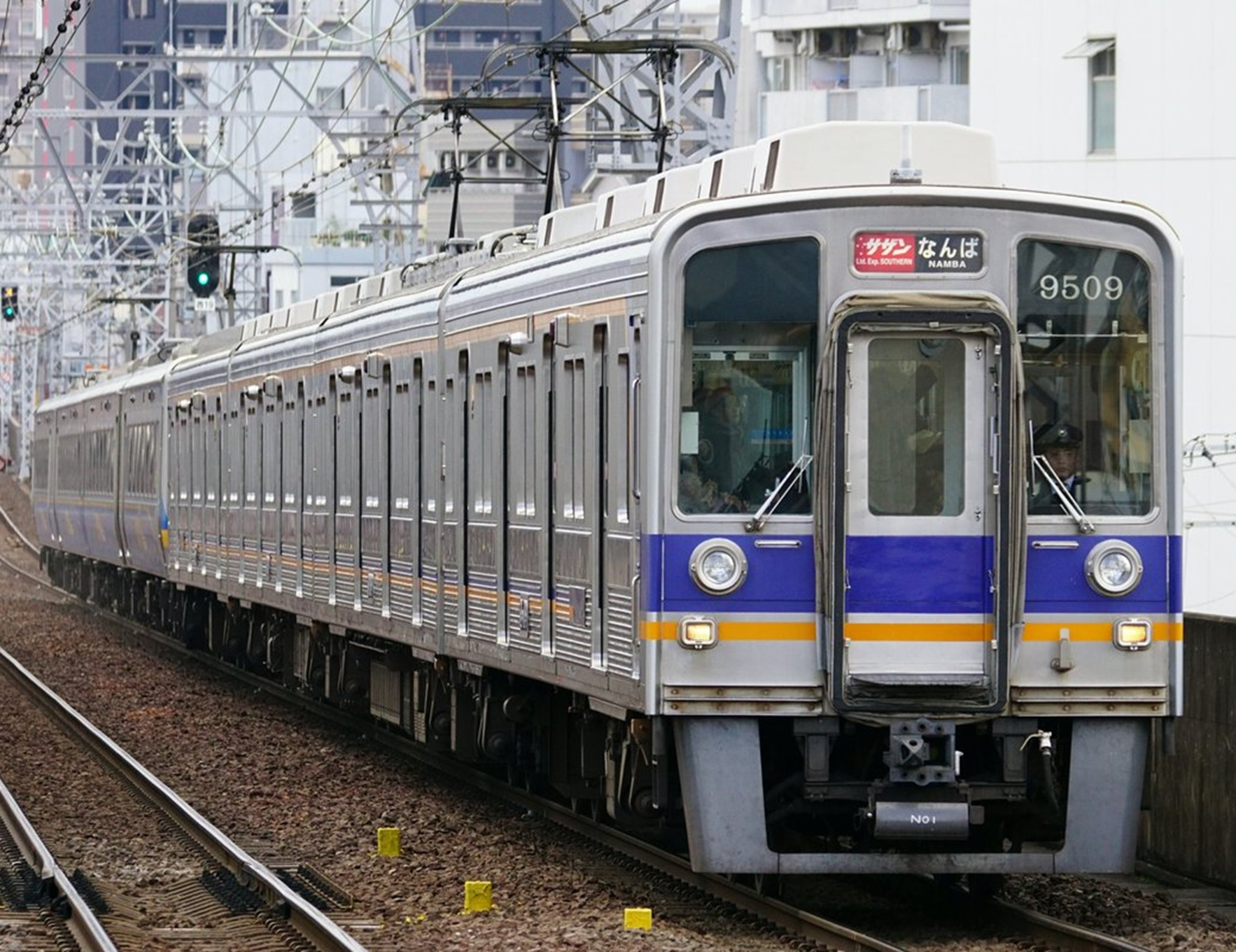
Four-car set 9509 on a Southern limited express service in December 2016

=== Refurbishment ===
As part of the "Nankai My Train" (NANKAI マイトレイン) campaign initiated in 2017, 9000 series set 9501 was refurbished in 2019. The set received a wood-themed interior, variable-voltage/variable-frequency traction motor control, and a limited-time orange livery. The interior was designed based on a customer survey conducted in February 2018.

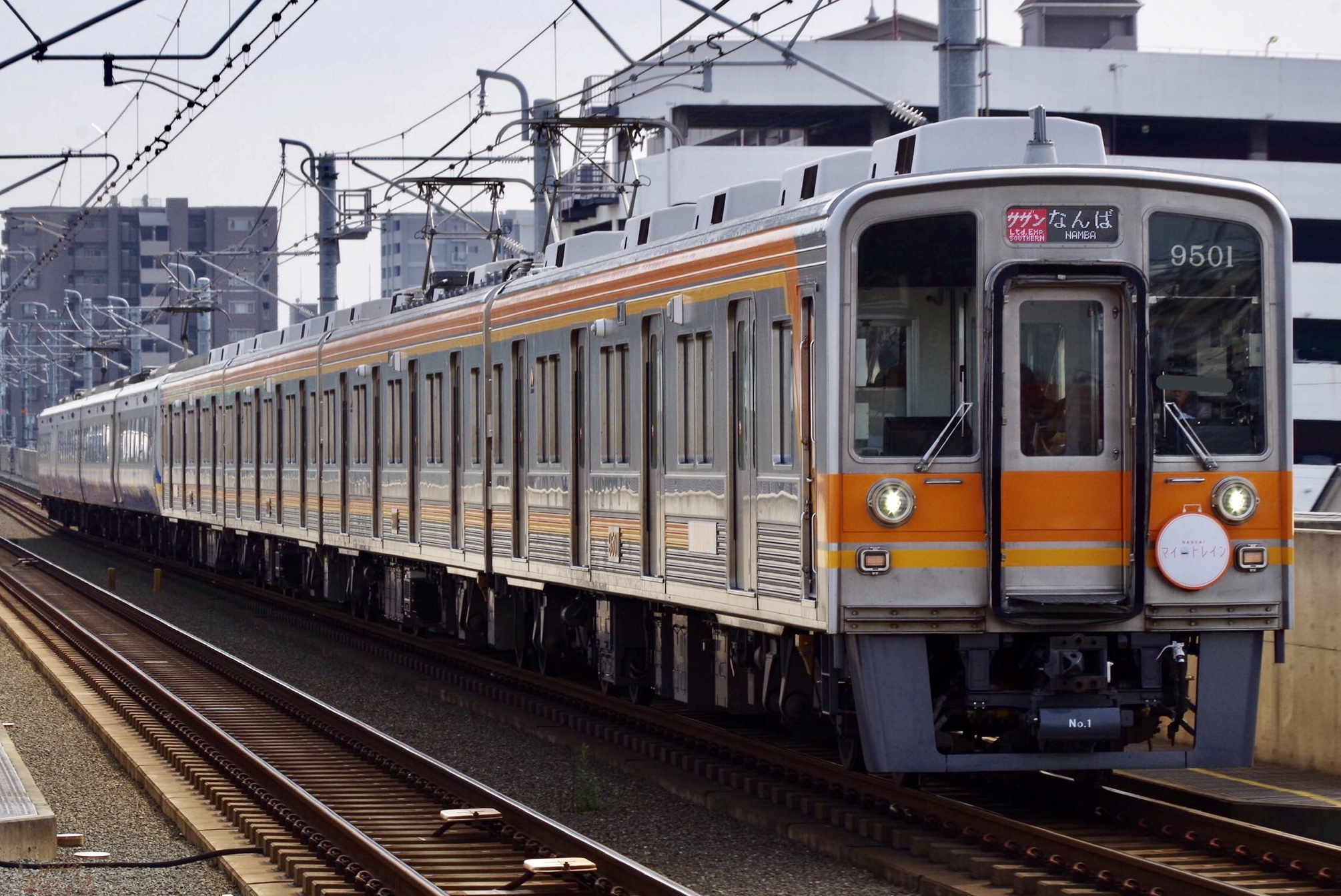
The first refurbished set, 9501, June 2019

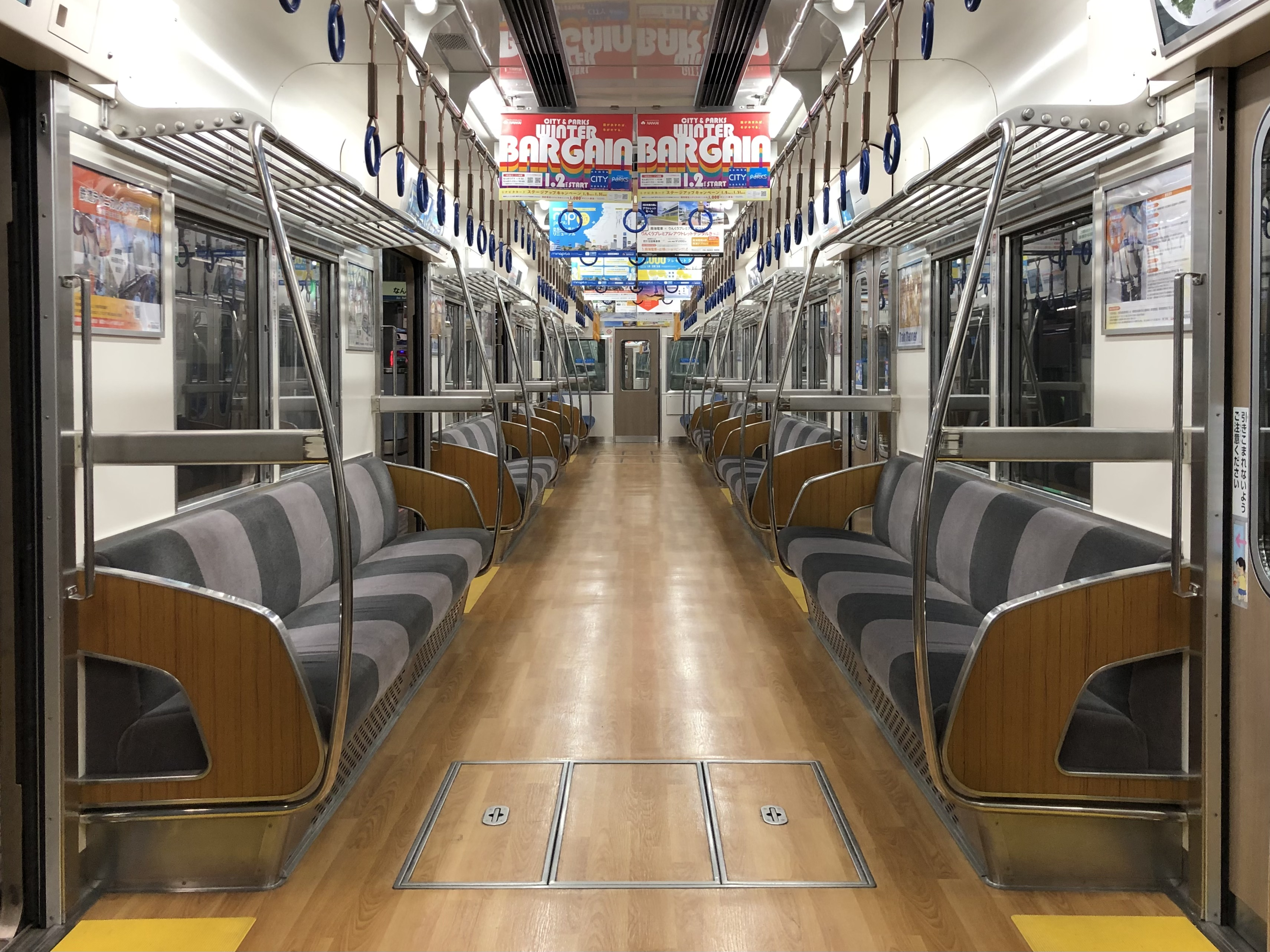
Refurbished interior, January 2024
