= Nankai 10000 series =

Japanese train type

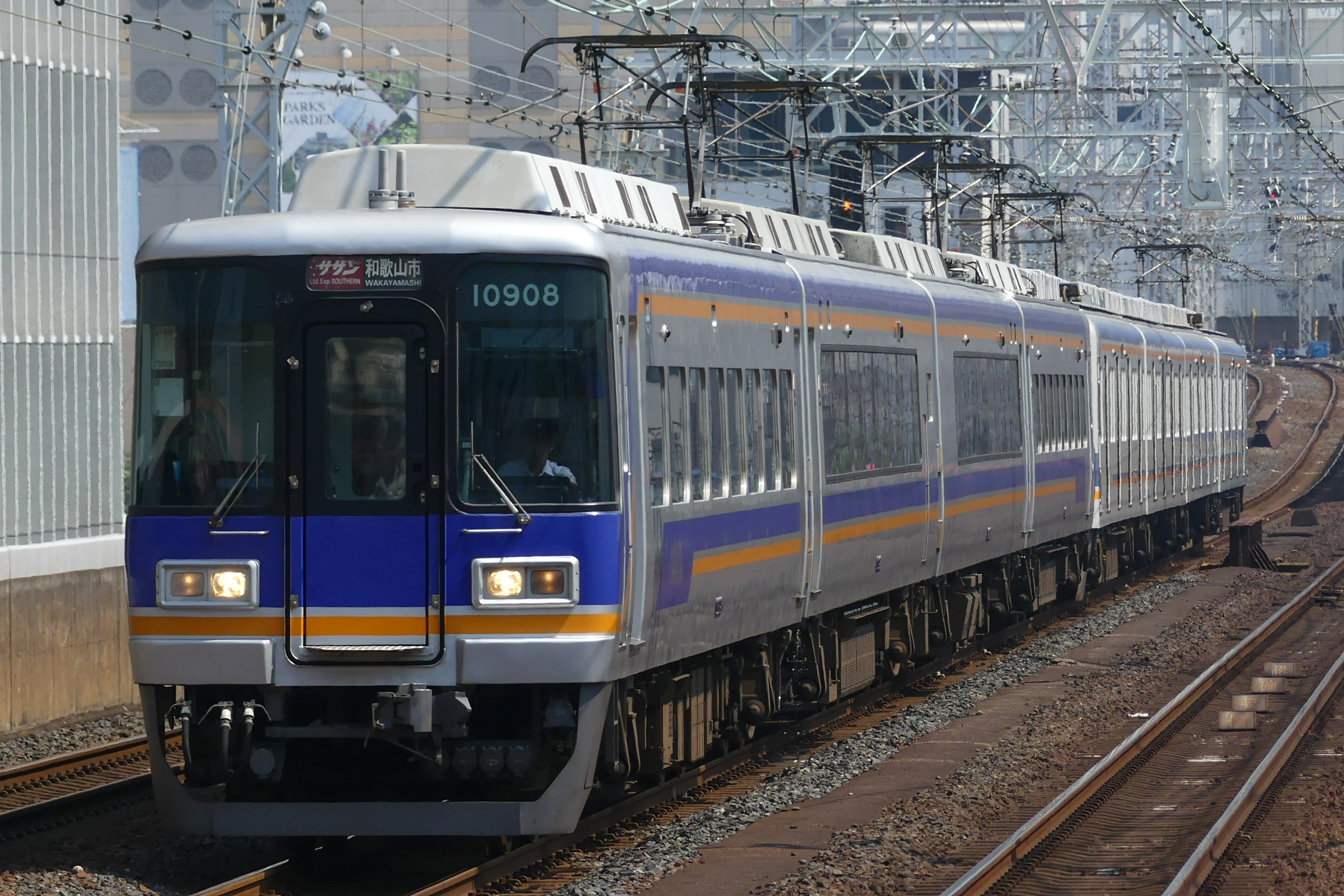
- 10000 series at Imamiyaebisu Station in July 2018
- In service: 1985 – present
- Manufacturer: Tokyu Car Corporation
- Constructed: 1985–1992
- Entered service: 1985
- Number built: 28 vehicles (7 sets)
- Number in service: 20 vehicles (5 sets)
- Number preserved: 1 cab end
- Number scrapped: 8 vehicles (as of 2014)
- Successor: 12000 series
- Formation: 4 cars per trainset
- Fleet numbers: 10001–10007
- Operator: Nankai Electric Railway
- Lines served: Nankai Main Line; Wakayamakō Line

Specifications
- Car body construction: Steel
- Maximum speed: 110 km/h (68 mph)
- Power output: 1,520 kW (2,040 hp) per 4-car set
- Electric systems: 1,500 V DC (overhead wire)
- Current collection: Pantograph
- Bogies: FS-528/FS-028
- Multiple working: 7000 series, 7100 series
- Seating: Transverse
- Track gauge: 1,067 mm (3 ft 6 in)

The Nankai 10000 series (南海10000系) is an electric multiple unit (EMU) commuter train type operated by the private railway operator Nankai Electric Railway in Japan on Southern Premium limited express services between Namba and Wakayamashi since 1985.

== Overview ==
As of 2014, the fleet consists of five four-car sets (10004, 10007 to 10010).

=== Formations ===
The four-car sets are formed as follows, with two motored ("M") cars and two non-powered intermediate trailer ("T") cars.

Designation	Mc	T	M	Tc
Numbering	1000x	1080x	1010x	1090x

== Interior ==
Passenger accommodation consists of transverse seating.

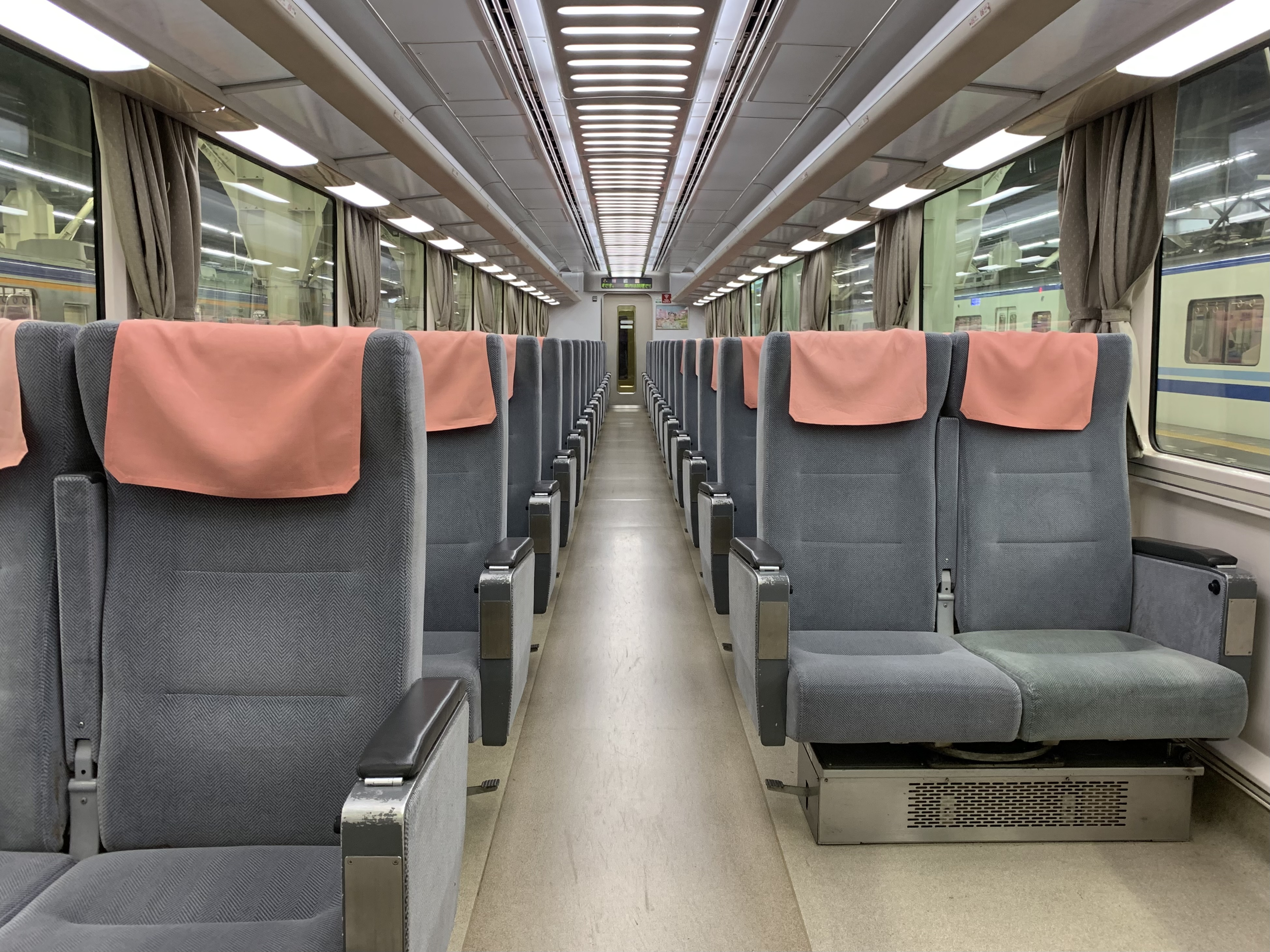
Interior of a 10000 series car in April 2024

== History ==
The 10000 series was originally delivered between 1985 and 1987 in 10 two-car formations. In 1992, the series was reformatted into seven four-car trainsets. This was done by manufacturing eight trailing cars for four sets and rebuilding the ends of three two-car sets to form the other three four-car sets.

At one point, the gear ratio in the bogies was decreased for possible operation at 120 km/h (75 mph).

In January 2011, it was announced that the 10000 series trainsets will undergo replacement by incoming 12000 series sets.

The first set to be scrapped was 10006 on 25 December 2012. Set 10005 followed suit and underwent scrapping on 7 May 2013. The front end of car 10905 is preserved at the Wakuwaku Train Land railway theme park.
