= Nankai 8000 series =

Japanese train type

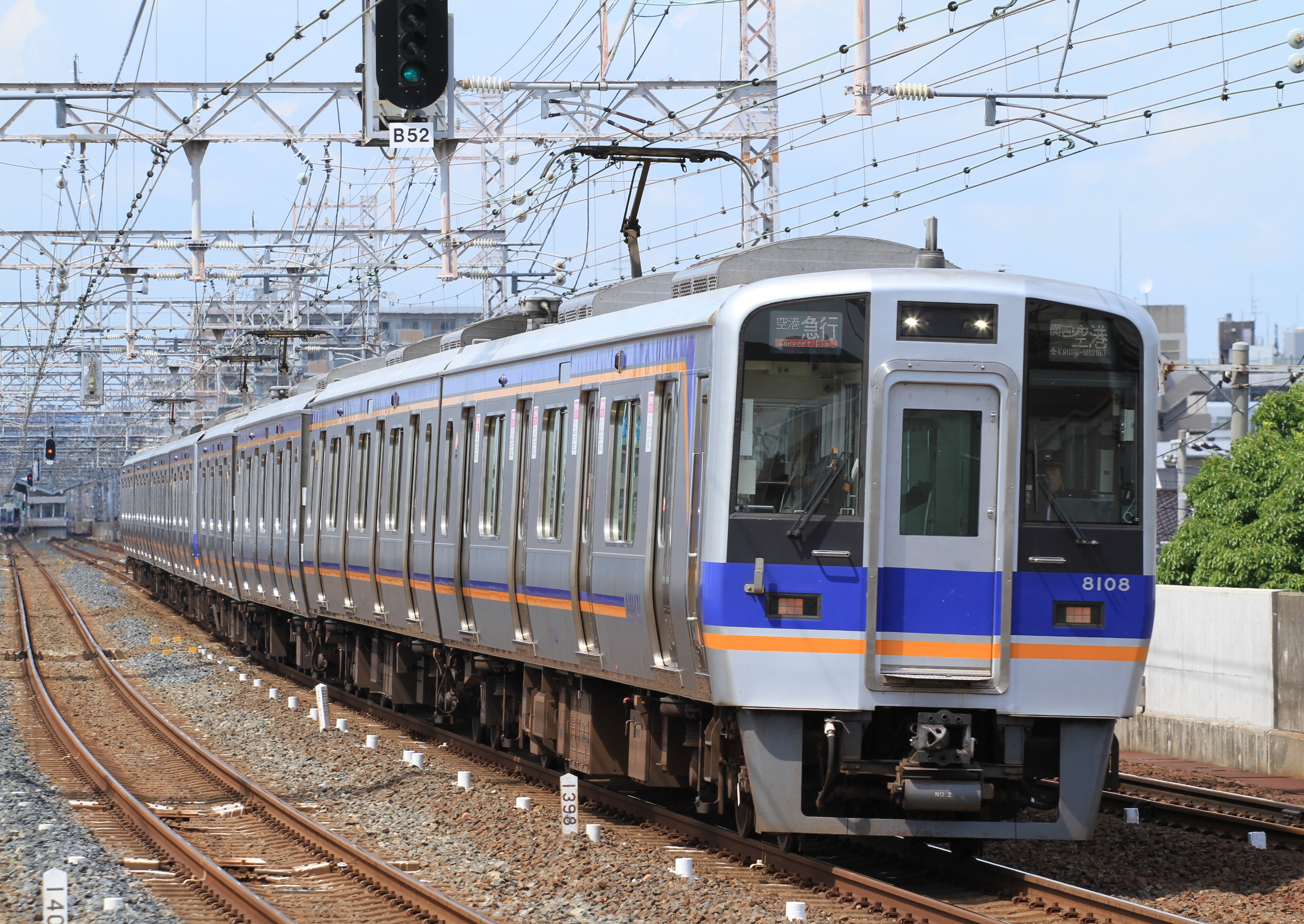
- Set 8008 in July 2017
- In service: 2008–
- Manufacturer: Tokyu Car, J-TREC
- Built at: Yokohama
- Replaced: 7000 series
- Constructed: 2007–
- Entered service: 26 March 2008
- Number built: 52 vehicles (13 sets)
- Number in service: 52 vehicles (13 sets)
- Formation: 4 cars per trainset
- Fleet numbers: 8001–
- Operator: Nankai Electric Railway
- Lines served: Nankai Main Line; Nankai Wakayamakō Line; Nankai Airport Line; Nankai Koya Line

Specifications
- Car body construction: Stainless steel
- Car length: 20,800 mm (68 ft 3 in) (end cars); 20,700 mm (67 ft 11 in) (intermediate cars)
- Width: 2,820 mm (9 ft 3 in)
- Height: 4,140 mm (13 ft 7 in) (end cars); 4,050 mm (13 ft 3 in) (intermediate cars)
- Floor height: 1,150 mm (3 ft 9 in)
- Doors: 4 pairs per side
- Maximum speed: 110 km/h (68 mph)
- Traction system: Variable-frequency
- Traction motors: MB-5091-A2 (180 kW) (4 per motor car)
- Power output: 1,440 kW per 4-car set
- Acceleration: 2.5 km/(h⋅s) (1.6 mph/s)
- Deceleration: 3.7 km/(h⋅s) (2.3 mph/s) (service); 4.0 km/(h⋅s) (2.5 mph/s) (emergency)
- Electric system: 1,500 V DC
- Current collection: Overhead wire
- Bogies: SS177M (motored); SS177T (trailer)
- Multiple working: 12000 series
- Track gauge: 1,067 mm (3 ft 6 in)

The Nankai 8000 series (南海8000系) is an electric multiple unit (EMU) train type operated by the private railway operator Nankai Electric Railway in Japan since 2008.

== History ==
Manufacturing of the 8000 series began in 2007 with the aim of replacing the aging 7000 series on the Nankai Main Line at the time. The specifications of the equipment and passenger compartment facilities are based on the 1000 series, but the design aimed to promote barrier-free access and reduce costs at the same time by applying standard products and standard construction methods adopted by other companies, mainly for the car body. The design concept is "a comfortable train for all passengers" and the catchphrase at the time of its introduction was "gentle and delightful".

The first two sets, 8001 and 8002, were delivered in October 2007. The first set entered service on 26 March 2008.

A total of 52 cars, consisting of 13 four-car train sets, were manufactured over a period of seven years. Since fiscal year 2015, the addition of new rolling stock has shifted to the next-generation 8300 series.

== Operations ==
The 8000 series is used on Nankai Main Line commuter services singly or coupled with 12000 series EMUs on Southern Premium limited express services to provide non-reserved accommodation. Since 12 October 2024, 8000 series sets have also been used on Koya Line services.

== Formation ==
As of 1 April 2016, the fleet consisted of thirteen four-car sets formed as follows with two motored (M) cars and two trailer (T) cars.

Designation	Mc1	T1	T2	Mc2
Numbering	8000	8800	8850	8100
Weight (t)	37.5	26.0	27.5	36.0
Capacity (total/seated)	142/47	152/55	152/55	142/47

The two end cars are each fitted with one PT7144-B single-arm pantograph.

== Interior ==
Passenger accommodation consists of longitudinal seating throughout, with a seat width of 460 mm (18 in) per person.

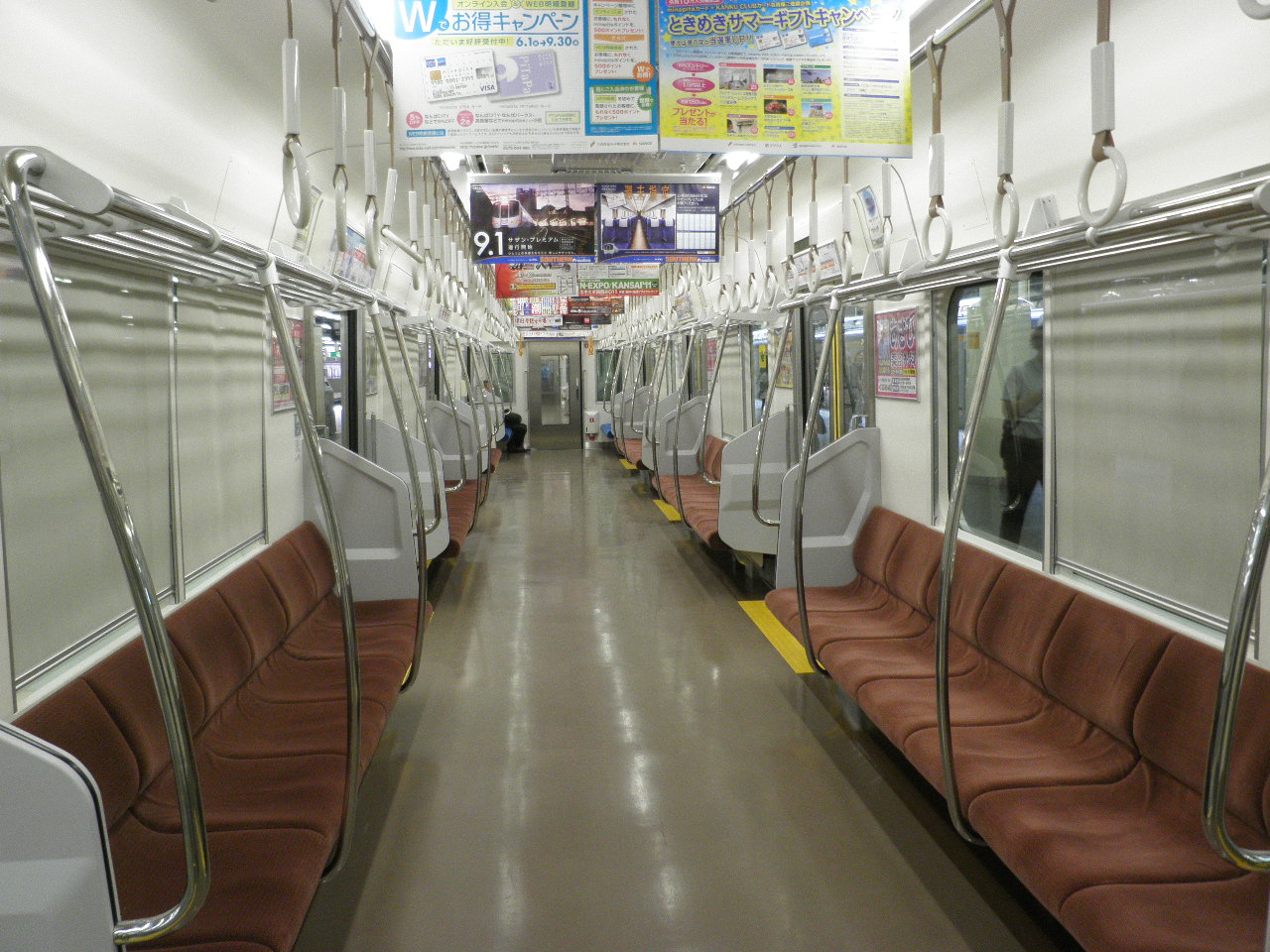
The interior of an 8000 series trainset in September 2011

== Fleet history ==
The fleet history details are as shown below.

Set No.	Manufacturer	Date delivered	Allocation
8001	Tokyu Car Corporation	October 2007	Main Line (2008–2024); Koya Line (2024–present)
8002	Tokyu Car Corporation	October 2007	Main Line (2008–2024); Koya Line (2024–present)
8003	Tokyu Car Corporation	March 2009	Main Line
8004	Tokyu Car Corporation	March 2009	Main Line
8005	Tokyu Car Corporation	November 2010	Main Line
8006	Tokyu Car Corporation	February 2012	Main Line
8007	Tokyu Car Corporation	February 2012	Main Line
8008	J-TREC (Yokohama)	January 2013	Main Line
8009	J-TREC (Yokohama)	January 2013	Main Line
8010	J-TREC (Yokohama)	March 2014	Main Line
8011	J-TREC (Yokohama)	March 2014	Main Line
8012	J-TREC (Yokohama)	March 2014	Main Line
8013	J-TREC (Yokohama)	March 2014	Main Line
