= Wakayamakō Station =

Railway station in Wakayama, Wakayama Prefecture, Japan

Wakayamakō Station 和歌山港駅
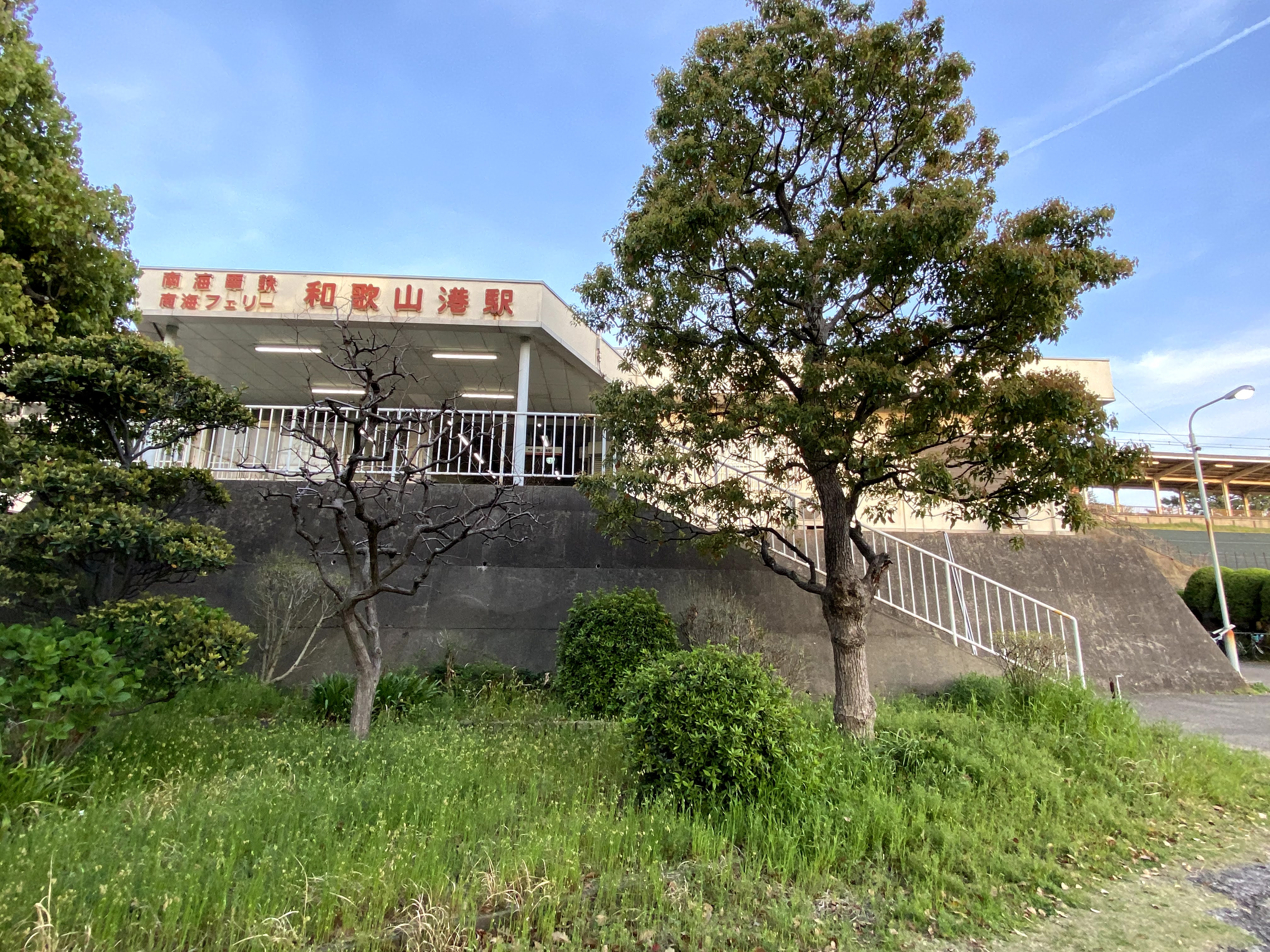
- Wakayamakō Station sign in March 2021

General information
- Other names: Wakayama Port Station
- Location: Minato, Wakayama-shi, Wakayama-ken 640-8404; Japan
- Coordinates: 34°13′02″N 135°08′46″E
- Operator: Nankai Electric Railway
- Line: Wakayamako Line
- Distance: 2.6 km from Wakayamashi
- Platforms: 1 island platform
- Connections: Port of Wakayama

Other information
- Station code: NK45-1
- Website: Official website

History
- Opened: March 6, 1971

Passengers
- 478 daily

Services
Preceding station	Nankai Electric Railway	Following station
Wakayamashi NK45 towards Namba	Southern	Terminus
Wakayamashi NK45 Terminus	Wakayamakō Line Express Local	Terminus
Location
- Location within Wakayama Prefecture Location within Japan

Wakayamakō Station (和歌山港駅, Wakayamakō-eki) is a passenger railway station located in the city of Wakayama, Wakayama Prefecture, Japan, operated by the private railway operator Nankai Electric Railway.

== Line ==
Wakayamakō Station is the terminus of the Wakayamako Line, and has the station number "NK45-1". It is located 2.6 kilometers from the opposing terminus of the line at Wakayamashi and is 67.0 kilometers from Nanba.

== Layout ==
The station has one elevated island platform.

=== Platforms ===
1, 2	■ Wakayamako Line, Nankai Main Line	for Wakayamashi, Kansai Airport and Namba

== History ==
Wakayamakō Station opened on March 6, 1971.

== Passenger statistics ==
In fiscal 2019, the station was used by an average of 478 passengers daily (boarding passengers only).

== Surrounding area ==
- Kinokawa River
- Kao Wakayama Plant / Wakayama Research Institute
- Wakayama Port Office, Kinki Regional Development Bureau, Ministry of Land, Infrastructure, Transport and Tourism
- Ministry of Land, Infrastructure, Transport and Tourism Kinki Transportation Bureau Wakayama Transportation Bureau Main Government Building

== See also ==
- List of railway stations in Japan
