= Nankai Electric Railway =

Japanese railway company

Nankai Co., Ltd.

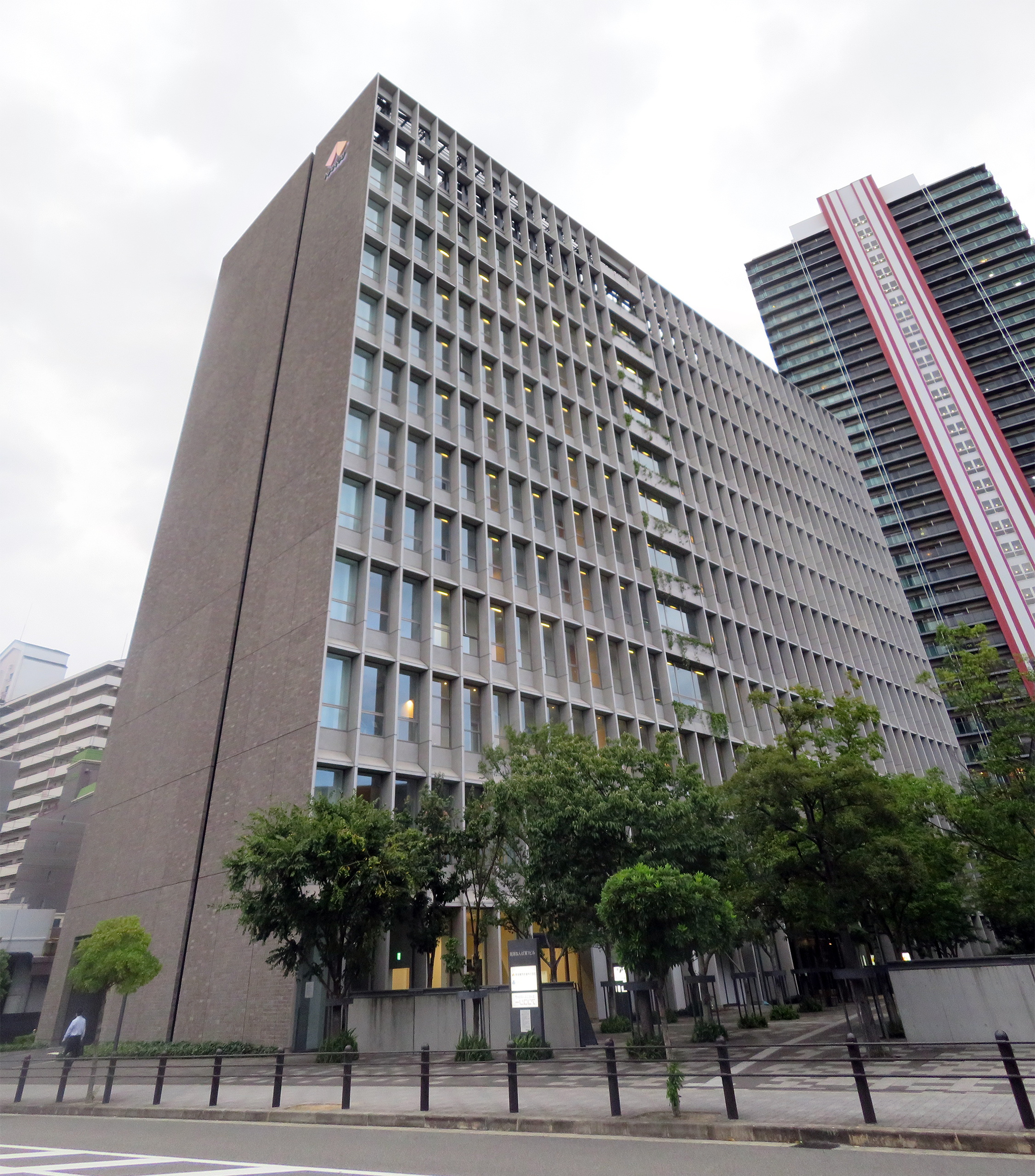
- Native name: 株式会社NANKAI
- Type: Public KK
- Traded as: TYO: 9044
- Industry: Ground transport
- Predecessor: Nankai Railway Co., Ltd. (former parent company founded on June 16, 1884)
- Founded: Kudoyama, Wakayama Prefecture, Japan (March 28, 1925, Koyasan Electric Railway Co., Ltd.)
- Headquarters: Nankai Namba Building, Shikitsu-higashi, Naniwa-ku, Osaka, Japan; Registered office: Namba Skyo, Namba, Chūō-ku, Osaka, Japan
- Services: Rail transit; Amusement parks; Real Estate; Retail
- Revenue: ▼¥181,869 million (March 2012)
- Operating income: ▼¥18,294 million (March 2012)
- Net income: ▲¥5,686 million (March 2012)
- Total assets: ▼¥789,591 million (March 2012)
- Total equity: ▲¥135,602 million (March 2012)
- Owner: Nippon Life (2.19%); Senshu Ikeda Bank (1.41%); Keisei Electric Railway (0.3%)
- Number of employees: 2,734 (March 31, 2012)
- Subsidiaries: Hankai Tramway Co., Ltd.; Semboku Rapid Railway Co., Ltd.; Nankai Bus Co., Ltd.; Nankai Rinkan Bus Co., Ltd.; Wakayama Bus Co., Ltd.; Kansai Airport Transport Enterprise Co., Ltd.; Nankai Ferry Co., Ltd.; Nankai Fudosan Co., Ltd.
- Website: nankai.co.jp

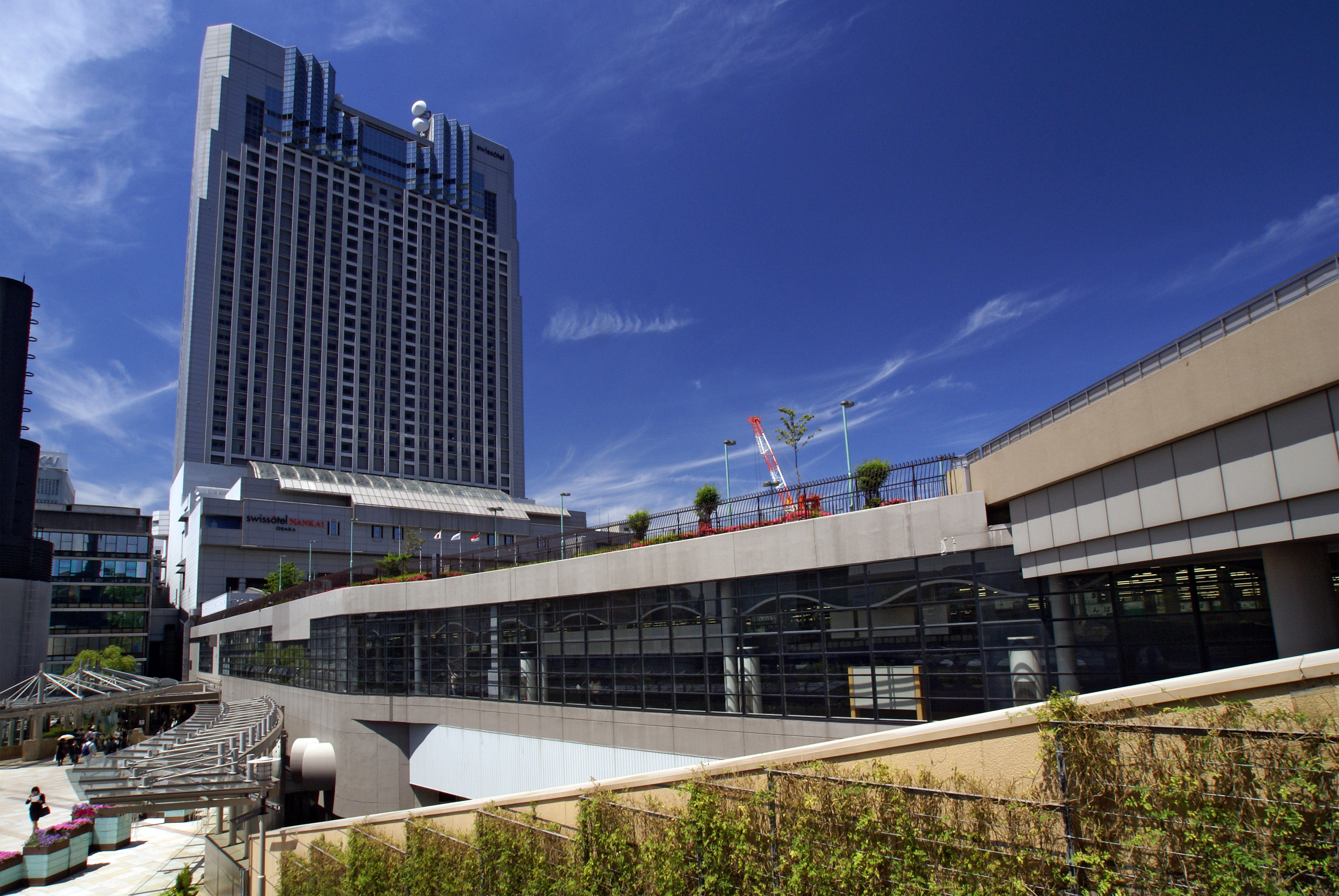
Nankai Namba Station & Swissôtel NANKAI OSAKA

Nankai Electric Railway Co., Ltd. (南海電気鉄道株式会社, Nankai denki tetsudō kabushiki gaisha) is a private railway in Japan, founded in 1884. The name Nankai (which means "South Sea") comes from the company's routes along the Nankaidō, the old highway that ran south from the old capital, Kyoto, along the sea coast. It is the oldest fully privatized railway company in Japan.

The Nankai network branches out in a generally southern direction from Namba Station in Osaka. The Nankai Main Line connects Osaka to Wakayama, with an important spur branching to Kansai International Airport. The rapi:t α express connects Kansai International Airport to Namba in 34 minutes, while the rapi:t β takes 39 minutes with two additional stops. The Koya Line connects Osaka to Mt. Koya, headquarters of the Buddhist Shingon sect and a popular pilgrimage site. IC cards (PiTaPa and ICOCA) are accepted.

== History ==
Winged wheel and first monshō of the Nankai Railway Company, reused by the Nankai Electric Railway until 1973.

The first predecessor of the Nankai Railway was founded on June 16, 1884 with 19 promoters, for the purpose of building a railway linking Osaka to Sakai. Originally named the Osaka-Sakai Railway, it was renamed the Hankai Railway in November of that year.

A number of privately-funded railway companies began planning lines south of Osaka in the late 1880s and early 1890s, including a Kisen Railway to Wakayama that was planned by the promoters of the Hankai Railway as a de facto extension of the existing Sakai line, and a competing plan known as the Kihan Railway. In October 1893, the Kisen and Kihan companies merged. After temporarily using the names Kisetsu Railway and Nanyo Railway, they settled on the "Nankai" name, derived from the historic Nankaido. This new company opened its line from Sakai to Izumisano in October 1897 and absorbed the Hankai Railway operation in October 1898. The full main line from Namba to Wakayama became operational in March 1903, was electrified in 1911, and was completely double-tracked in 1922.

The Hankai Line opened in 1910 as a competitor to the Nankai Railway between Osaka and Sakai. After several years of intense competition, which saw Nankai acquire or open ancillary businesses and expand its on-board offerings to include tea room service, Nankai acquired the Hankai Line in June 1915.

From June 1930, the Nankai Line competed with the new Hanwa Line that connected Osaka and Wakayama. In 1936, Nankai introduced the first air-conditioned trains in Japan. These were withdrawn from service in 1938 amid government pressure to conserve resources in the early years of World War II. As the war progressed, the government eventually forced Nankai to acquire the Hanwa Line in December 1940, and then to divest it to the Ministry of Railways in May 1944. One month later, Nankai was forced to merge with Kansai Express Railway to create Kinki Nippon Railway (Kintetsu). After the war, this transaction was effectively reversed, with the former Nankai lines being spun out to a new Nankai Electric Railway Co., Ltd. in June 1947.

Monshō of the Nankai Electric Railway since 1972; used as main logo until 1993.

During the 1950s, Nankai established and acquired ancillary bus and ferry services connecting its core railway service area to Shikoku, Awaji Island, and the Kii Peninsula. From the 1980s it was involved in the development of Kansai International Airport, which opened in September 1994 with a Nankai rail connection.

From 1938 to 1988, Nankai Electric Railway owned the Nankai Hawks, a team in Nippon Professional Baseball that was based at Osaka Stadium. The team was sold to Daiei after the 1988 season and moved to Fukuoka and rechristened the Fukuoka Daiei Hawks. The team was sold again in 2005 to SoftBank, and are now the Fukuoka SoftBank Hawks.

On November 1, 2024, Ministry of Land, Infrastructure, Transport and Tourism (MLIT) approved the merger of Nankai Electric Railway and its subsidiary Semboku Rapid Railway, effective April 1, 2025.

== Lines ==
Geographic map of the Nankai Electric Railway

- Nankai Line (南海線)
- Nankai Main Line (南海本線): Namba – Wakayamashi
- Takashinohama Line (高師浜線): Hagoromo – Takashinohama
- Airport Line (空港線): Izumisano – Kansai Airport
- Tanagawa Line (多奈川線): Misaki koen – Tanagawa
- Kada Line (加太線): Kinokawa – Kada
- Wakayamako Line (和歌山港線): Wakayamashi – Wakayamako
- Koya Line (高野線)
- Koya Line (高野線): Shiomibashi - Kishinosato-Tamade – Gokurakubashi
  - In operation: Namba - Gokurakubashi
  - Shiomibashi Line (汐見橋線, commonly called): Shiomibashi – Kishinosato-Tamade
- Semboku Line (泉北線): Nakamozu – Izumi-Chuo
- Cable Line (鋼索線): Gokurakubashi – Koyasan

=== Defunct lines and transferred lines ===
- Nankai Line (南海線)
  - Tennoji Branch (天王寺支線): Tengachaya – Tennoji (replaced by the Sakaisuji Line)
  - Kitajima Branch (北島支線): Wakayamashi – Kitajima - Higashi-Matsue (abandoned)
  - Wakayamako Line (和歌山港線): Wakayamako – Suiken (abandoned)
- Kishigawa Line (貴志川線, dealt with Wakayama Electric Railway Co., Ltd. (和歌山電鐵株式会社)): Wakayama – Kishi
- Osaka Tram Line (大阪軌道線)
  - Hankai Line (阪堺線): Ebisucho – Hamadera-eki-mae (dealt with Hankai Tramway Co., Ltd.)
  - Uemachi Line (上町線): Tennoji-eki-mae – Sumiyoshikoen (dealt with Hankai Tramway Co., Ltd.)
  - Hirano Line (平野線): Imaike – Hirano (replaced by the Tanimachi Line)
  - Ohama Branch (大浜支線): Shukuin – Ohama-kaigan (abandoned)
- Wakayama Tram Line (和歌山軌道線): Wakayamashi-eki, Wakayama-eki – Kainan, Shin-Wakaura (abandoned)

== Rolling stock ==
=== Limited express trains ===
- 50000 series — used on rapi:t service between Namba and Kansai airport
- 31000 series — used on Kōya service between Namba and Gokurakubashi
- 30000 series — used on Kōya service between Namba and Gokurakubashi
- 12000 series — used on Southern service reserved car between Namba and Wakayamakō
- 11000 series — used on Rinkan service between Namba and Hashimoto
- 10000 series — used on Southern service reserved car between Namba and Wakayamakō

=== Nankai Line, Airport Line ===
- 9000 series — used on Southern service non-reserved car between Namba and Wakayamakō
- 8300 series — used on Southern service non-reserved car between Namba and Wakayamakō
- 8000 series — used on Southern service non-reserved car between Namba and Wakayamakō
- 7100 series — used on Southern service non-reserved car between Namba and Wakayamakō
- 3000 series — converted from former Semboku 3000 series
- 2000 series
- 1000 series

=== Kōya Line Commuter car (Namba-Hashimoto) ===
- 8300 series
- 6300 series — converted from former 6100 series
- 6250 series — converted from former 8200 series
- 6200 series
- 6000 series
- 1000 series

=== Kōya Line Zoom car (Namba-Gokurakubashi) ===
- 2300 series
- 2200 series — used on Tenkū service
- 2000 series

=== Takashinohama Line, Tanagawa Line, Kada Line, Shiomibashi Line ===
- 7100 series
- 2220 series
- 2200 series

=== Semboku Line ===
The following vehicles once made up the fleet of the Semboku Rapid Railway. They were transferred to Nankai on 1 April 2025.

- Semboku 3000 series
- Semboku 5000 series
- Semboku 7000 series
  - Semboku 7020 series
- Semboku 9300 series
- Semboku 12000 series

=== Cable Line ===
- N10 / N20
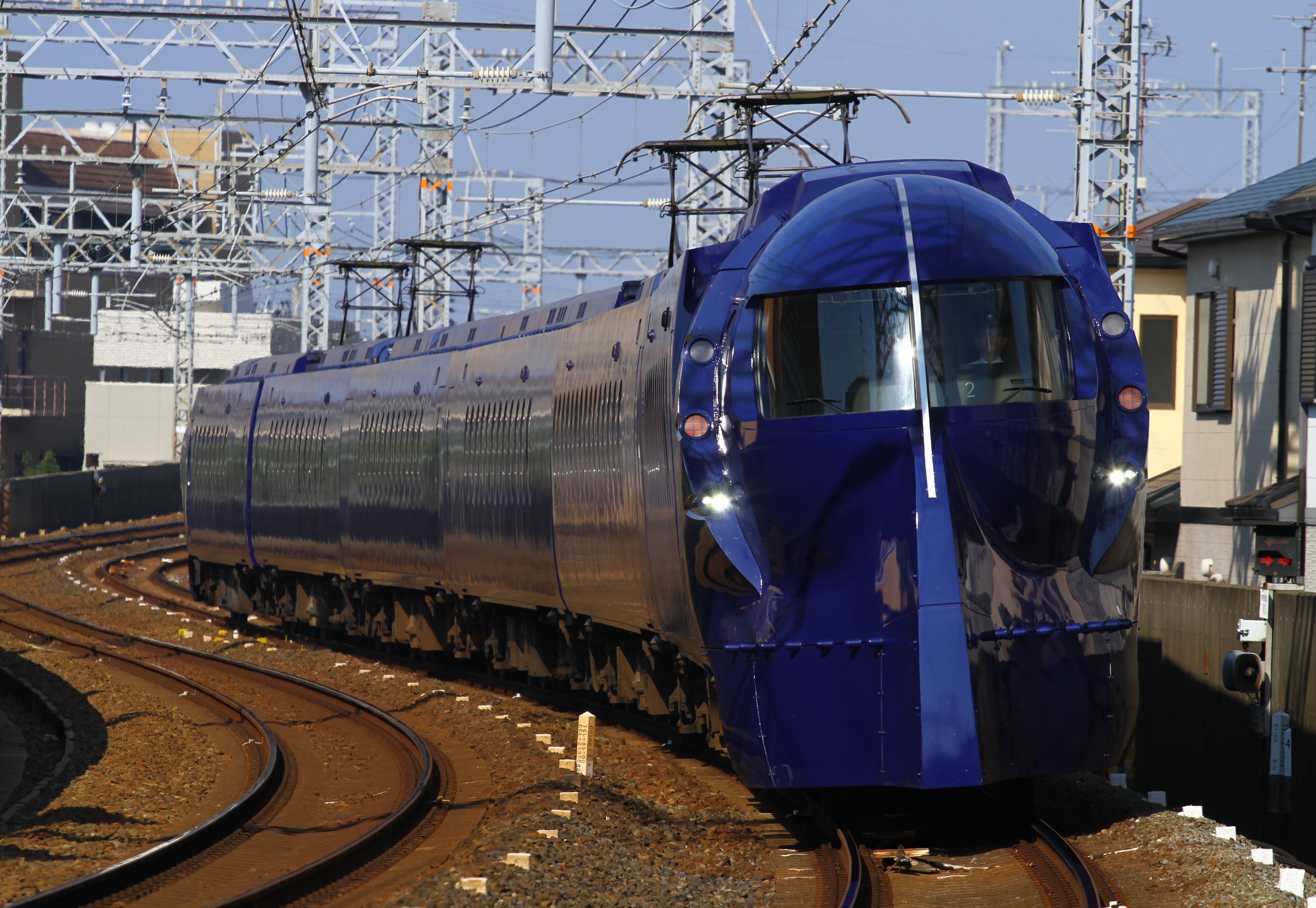
Nankai 50000 series on rapi:t service

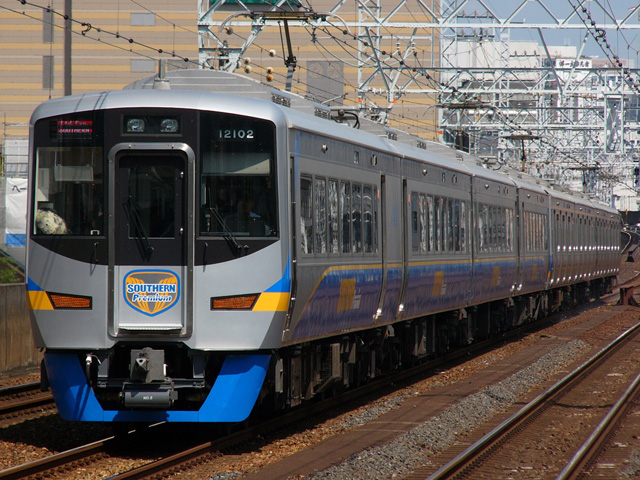
Nankai 12000 series on Southern service

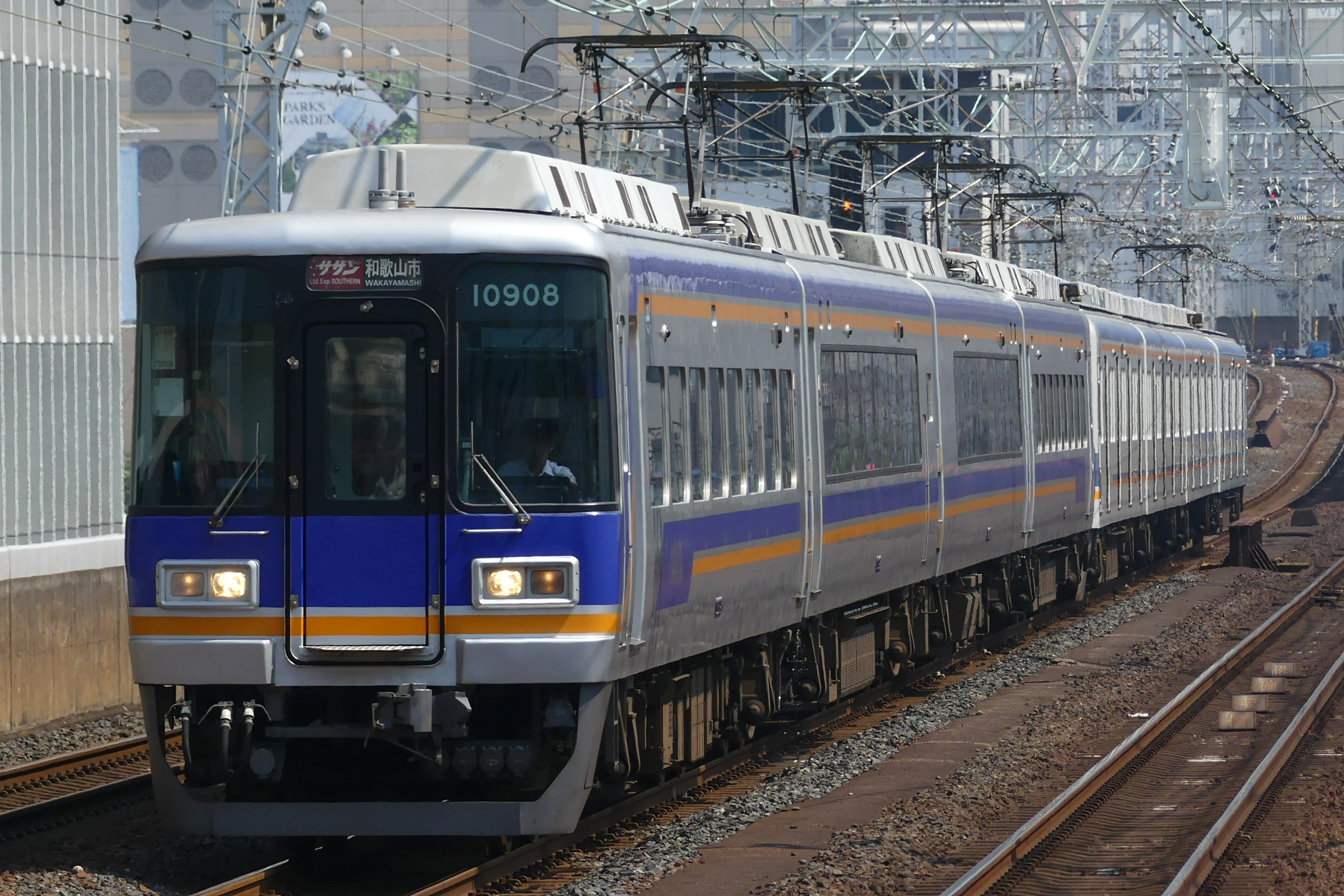
Nankai 10000 series on Southern service

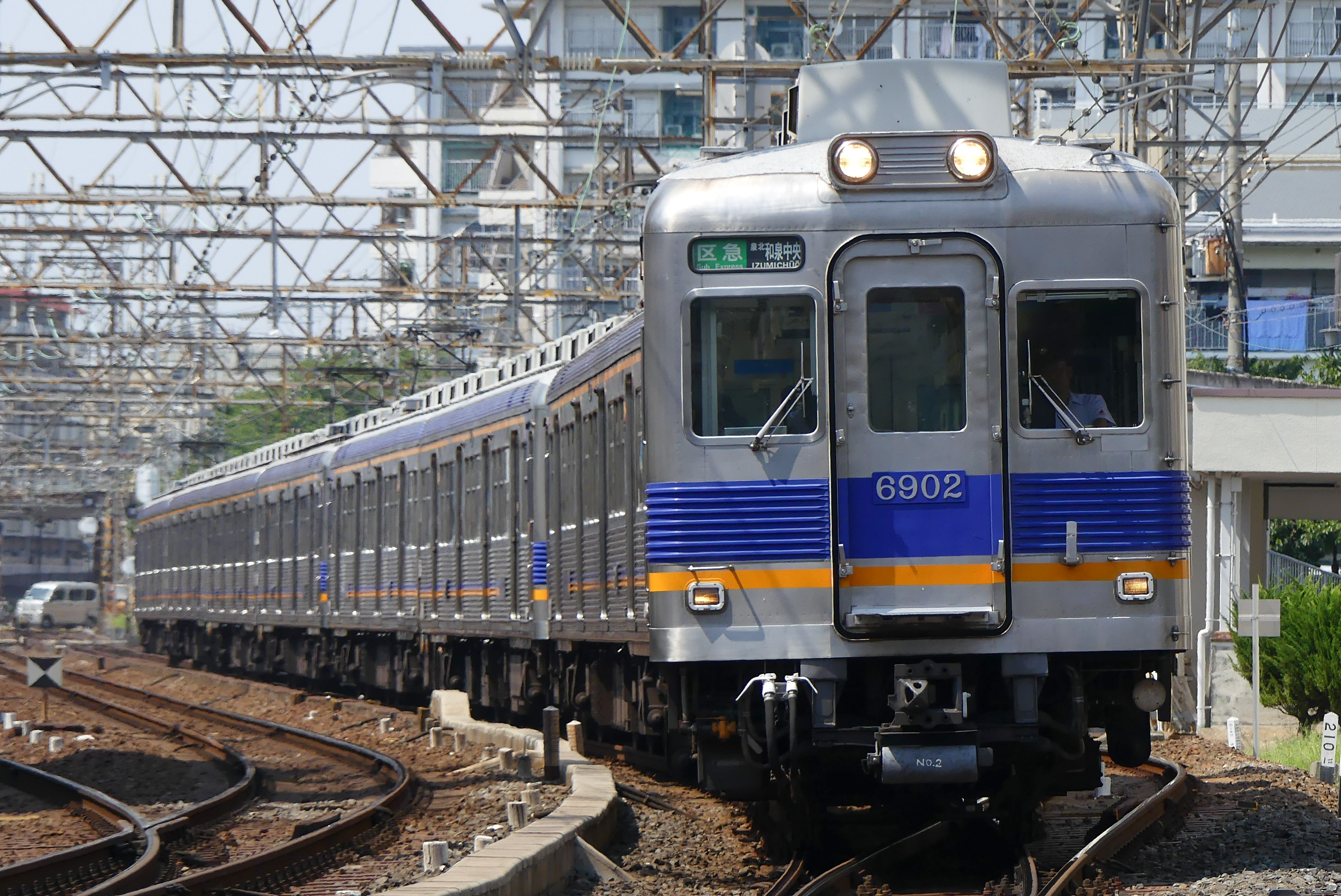
Nankai 6000 series

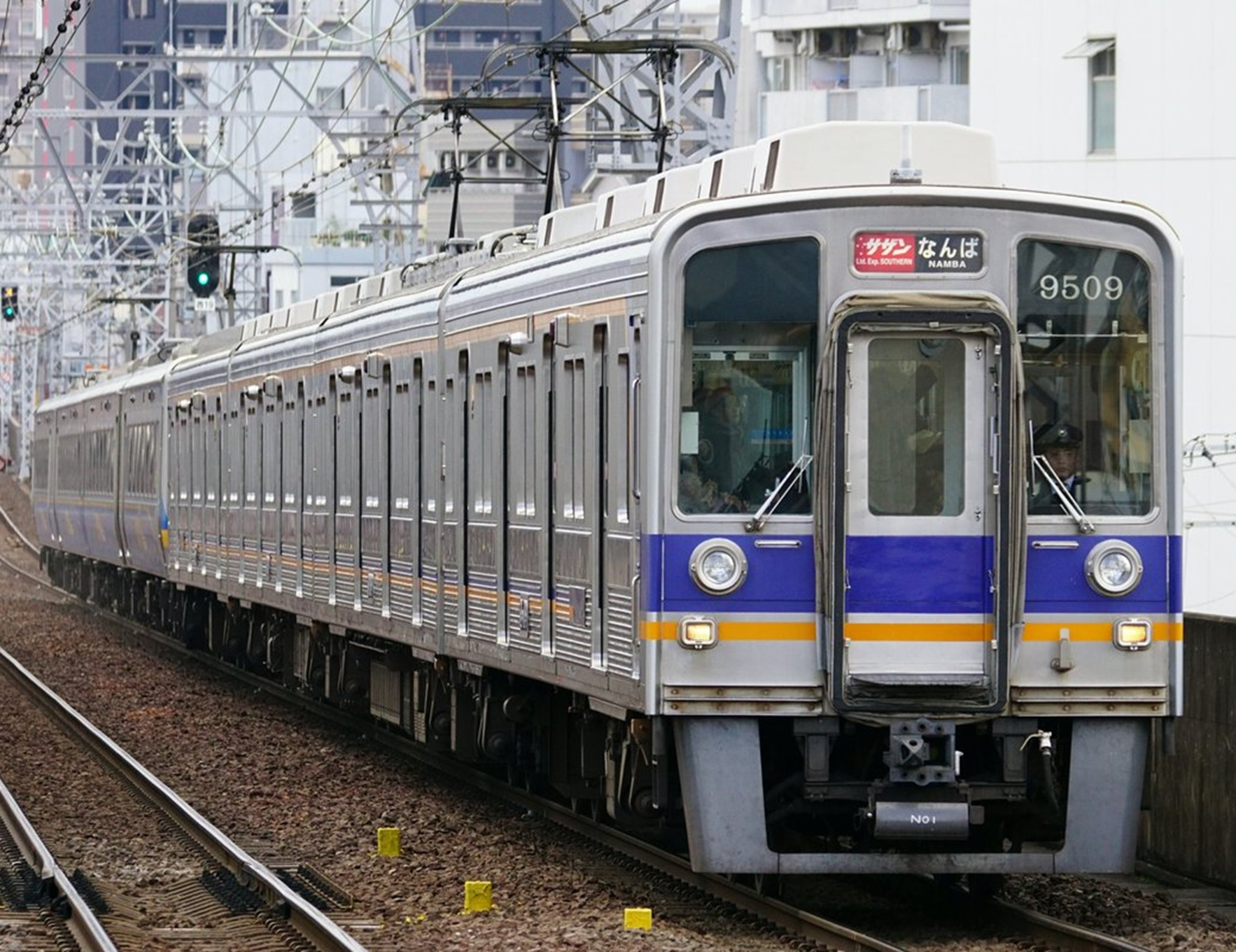
Nankai 9000 series on Southern service

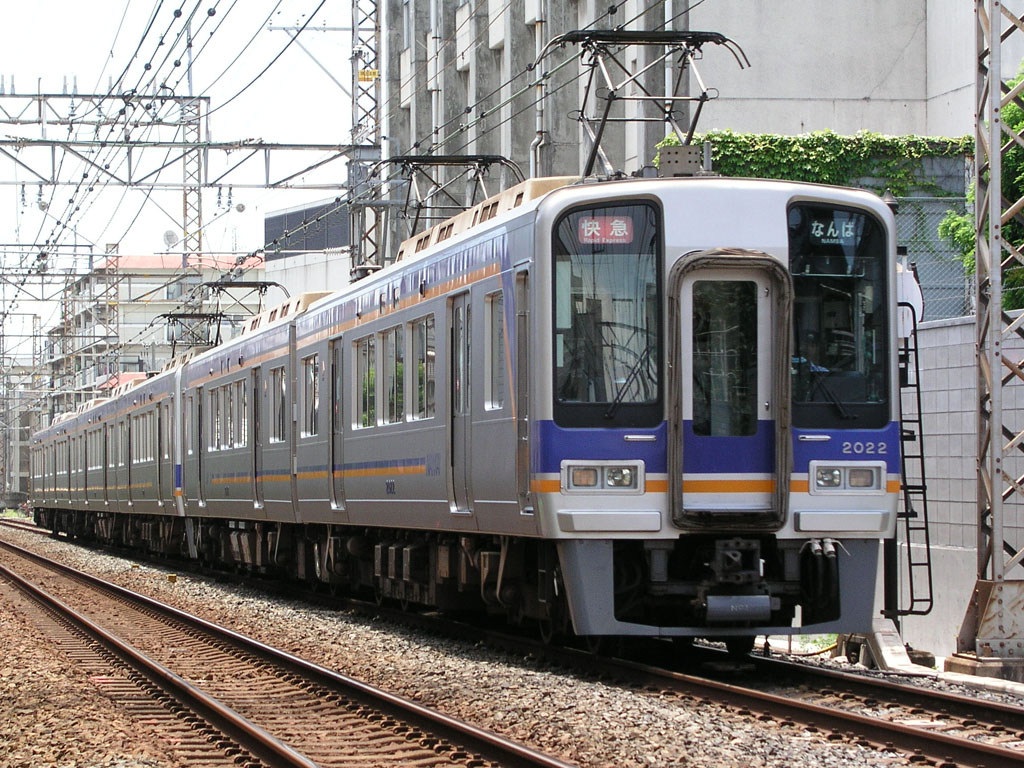
Nankai 2000 series ("Zoom Car")

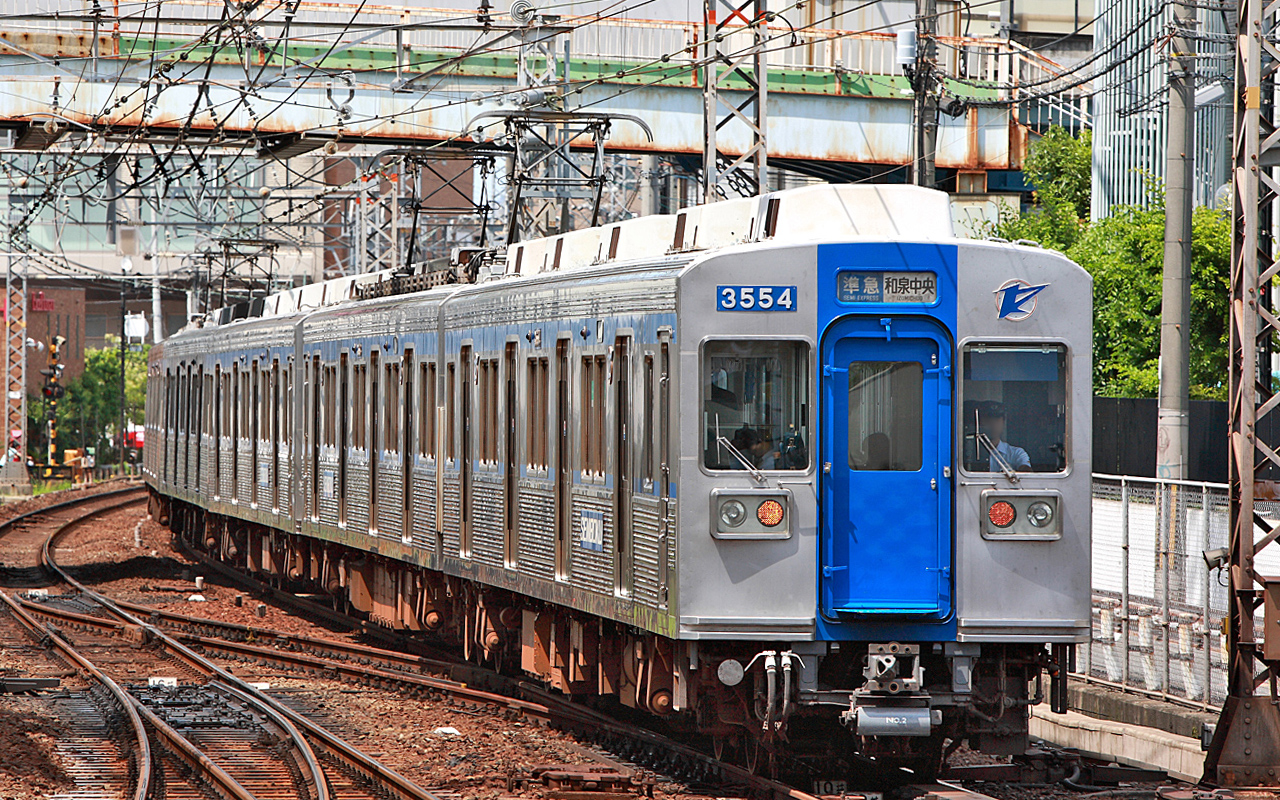
Semboku 3000 series

== See also ==
- Hankai Tramway Co., Ltd.
- Semboku Rapid Railway Co., Ltd.
