= Wakayamako Line =

Railway line in Wakayama, Japan

Nankai Wakayamakō Line
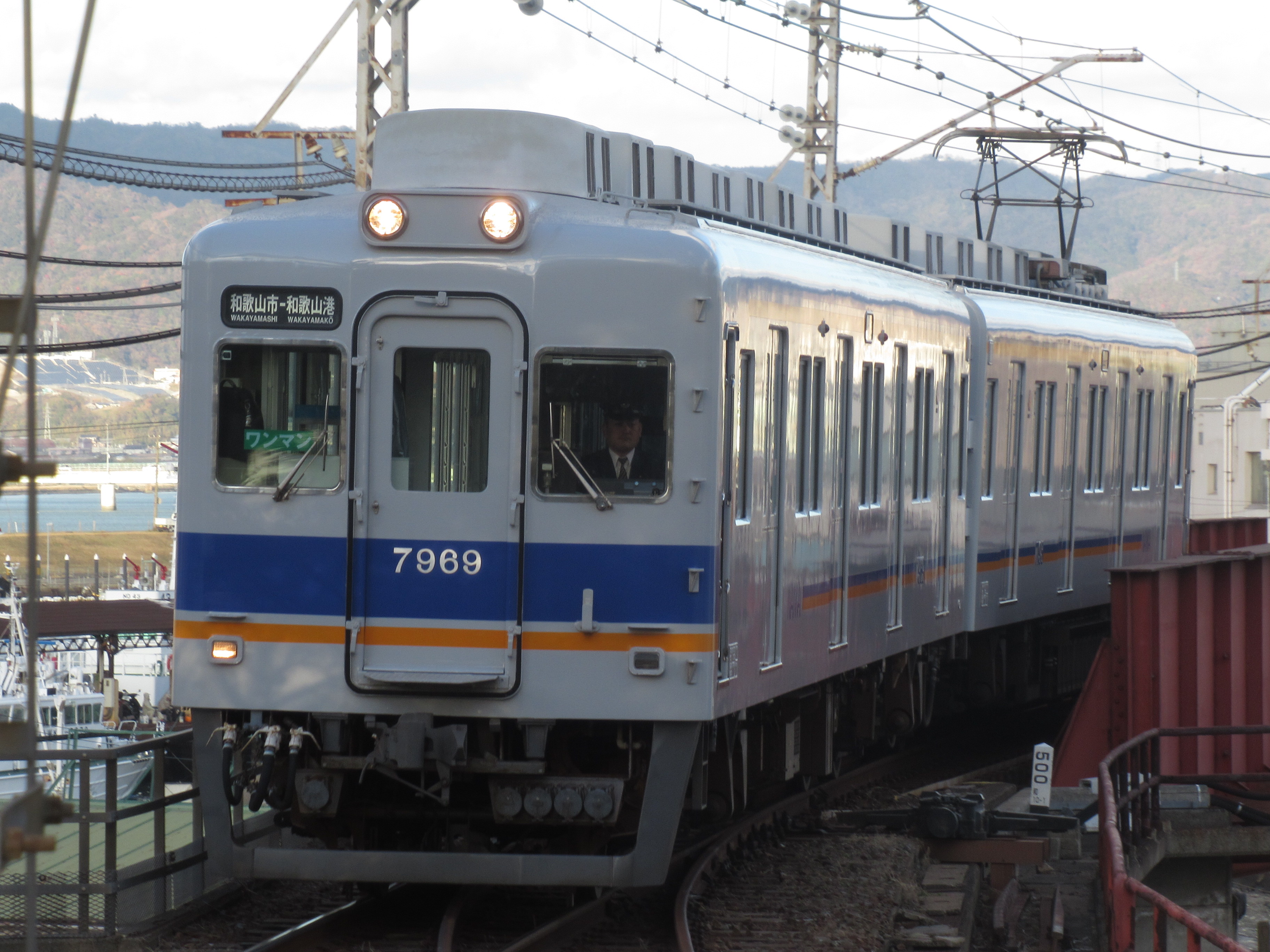
- A 7000 series train arriving at Wakayamako Station

History
- Opened: 1956; 70 years ago

Technical
- Track gauge: 1,067 mm (3 ft 6 in)
- Electrification: 1500 DC

The Wakayamakō Line (和歌山港線, Wakayamakō-sen) is a railway line operated by Japanese private railway company Nankai Electric Railway that runs in Wakayama, Wakayama Prefecture, between Wakayamashi and Wakayamakō stations.

The purpose of the line is to provide a railway link to Wakayama Port that has ferry service to Tokushima in Shikoku. The line is jointly owned by Nankai and Wakayama Prefecture.

== History ==
Opened in 1956 by Nankai from Wakayamashi to later Chikkōchō (then Wakayamakō) for rail connection to its ferry to Shikoku. In 1971 the line was extended to Suiken via present Wakayamakō, by Wakayama Prefecture for the expansion of the port and to provide freight access to then planned lumber transport. The section between Wakayamakō and Suiken was closed in 2002, until then freight train had never operated. The stations between Wakayamashi and Wakayamakō were abandoned in 2005 due to few passengers, then Kubochō Station was renamed the "Prefecture-Company Boundary" (県社分界点, Ken-sha Bunkai ten).

== Operations ==
All trains are operated for the connection to and from Nankai Ferry.

Weekdays
Limited express trains named "Southern" and express trains run through to and from Namba, and local trains run between Wakayamashi and Wakayamako. 2 Namba-bound express trains were changed to the local trains to Wakayamashi on October 1, 2012. The 2 express trains start at Wakayamashi.
Weekends and holidays
11 round trips are operated; two are limited express trains named "Southern" which run through to and from Namba, and the rest are local trains running between Wakayamashi and Wakayamako.

== Stations ==
Number	Image	Station	Japanese	Distance (km)	Transfers	Notes
NK45		Wakayamashi	和歌山市	0.0	Nankai Main Line (Through service); JR West: Kisei Main Line	
		Prefecture-Company Boundary		(0.8)		Until 2005 named "Kubochō" (久保町) with passenger traffic
		Tsukijibashi	築地橋			Abandoned in 2005
		Chikkōchō	築港町			Abandoned in 2005. Named "Wakayamakō" until 1971
NK45-1		Wakayamakō	和歌山港	2.8		
		Suiken	水軒			Abandoned in 2002
