= Sakaihigashi Station =

Railway station in Sakai, Japan

Sakaihigashi Station 堺東駅
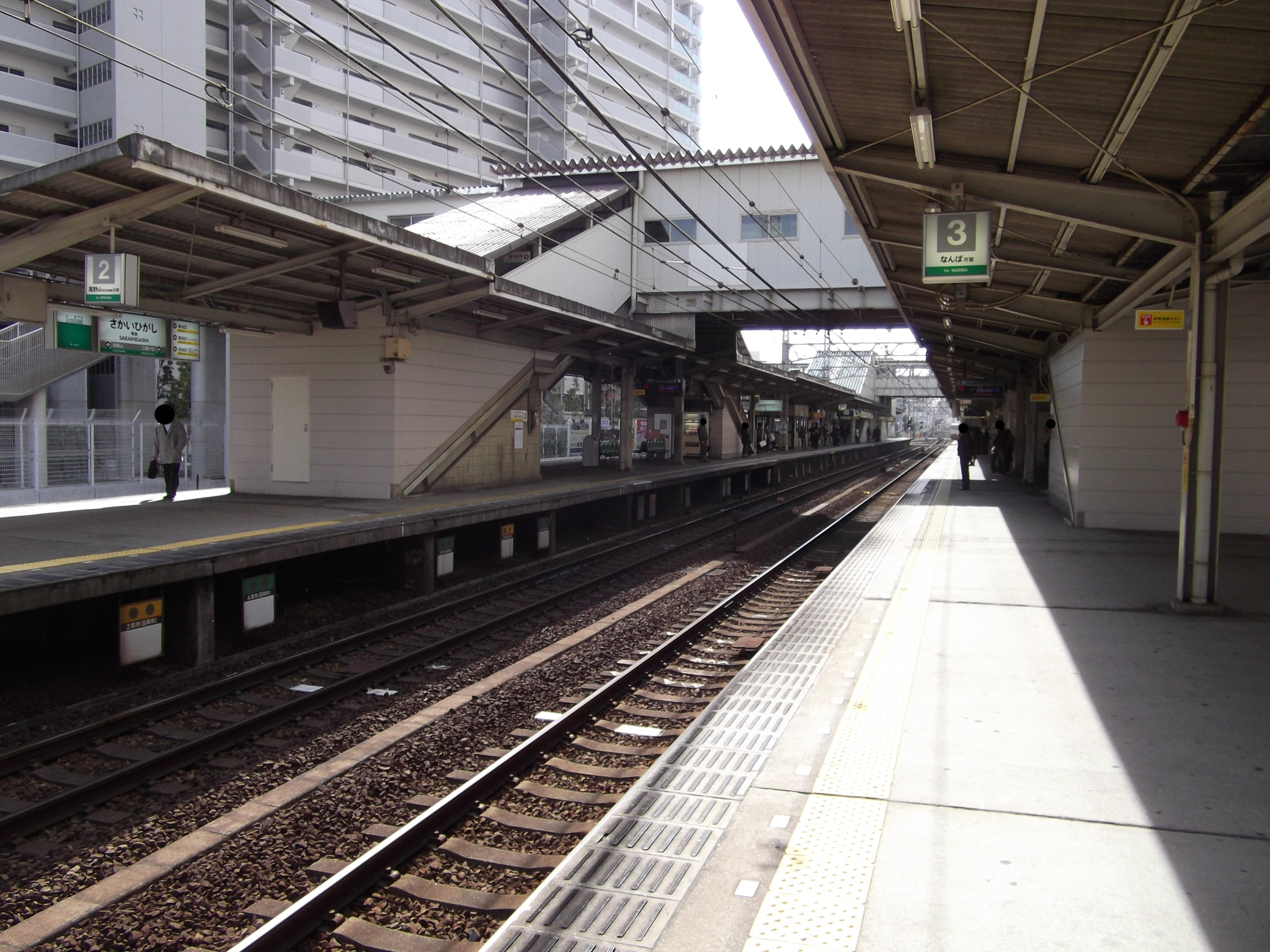
- Sakaihigashi Station Platform

General information
- Location: 61, Mikunigaoka-Miyukidōri, Sakai-ku, Sakai-shi, Osaka-fu 590-0028; Japan
- Coordinates: 34°34′31.79″N 135°29′5.43″E
- Operator: Nankai Electric Railway
- Line: Koya Line
- Distance: 11.0 km from Shiomibashi
- Platforms: 2 island platforms
- Tracks: 4
- Connections: Bus terminal

Other information
- Station code: NK56
- Website: Official website

History
- Opened: January 30,1898
- Former names: Ōshoji (until 1900)

Passengers
- 2019: 60,486 daily
Location
- Location within Osaka Prefecture Location within Japan

Sakaihigashi Station (堺東駅, Sakaihigashi-eki) is a passenger railway station located in Higashi-ku, Sakai, Osaka Prefecture, Japan, operated by the private railway operator Nankai Electric Railway. It has the station number "NK56".

== Lines ==
Sakaihigashi Station is served by the Nankai Koya Line, and is 11.0 kilometers from the terminus of the line at Shiomibashi and 10.3 kilometers from Nanba.

== Layout ==
The station consists of two island platforms with an elevated station building.

=== Platforms ===
1, 2	■ Kōya Line (southbound)	for Koyasan and (Semboku Rapid Railway) Izumi-Chuo
3, 4	■ Kōya Line (northbound)	for Namba

== Adjacent stations ==
«	Service	»
Nankai Electric Railway Koya Line (NK56)
Asakayama (NK55)	Local	Mikunigaoka (NK57)
Tengachaya (NK05)	Semi-Express	Mikunigaoka (NK57)
Tengachaya (NK05)	Sub. Express	Kitanoda (NK63)
Tengachaya (NK05)	Sub. Express for Semboku Rapid Railway Line	Fukai (SB02, Semboku Rapid Railway)
Tengachaya (NK05)	Express	Kitanoda (NK63)
Tengachaya (NK05)	Rapid Express	Kitanoda (NK63)
Tengachaya (NK05)	Limited Express "Koya"; Limited Express "Rinkan"	Kongō (NK66)
Limited Express "Semboku Liner": Does not stop at this station

== History ==
Sakaihigashi Station opened on January 30,1898 as Ōshoji Station (大小路駅). It is one of the stations on the Koya Line with long history as it was the station of origin operated by Koya Railway, the predecessor of the Koya Line. It was renamed to its present name on September 3, 1900.

== Passenger statistics ==
In fiscal 2019, the station was used by an average of 60,486 passengers daily.

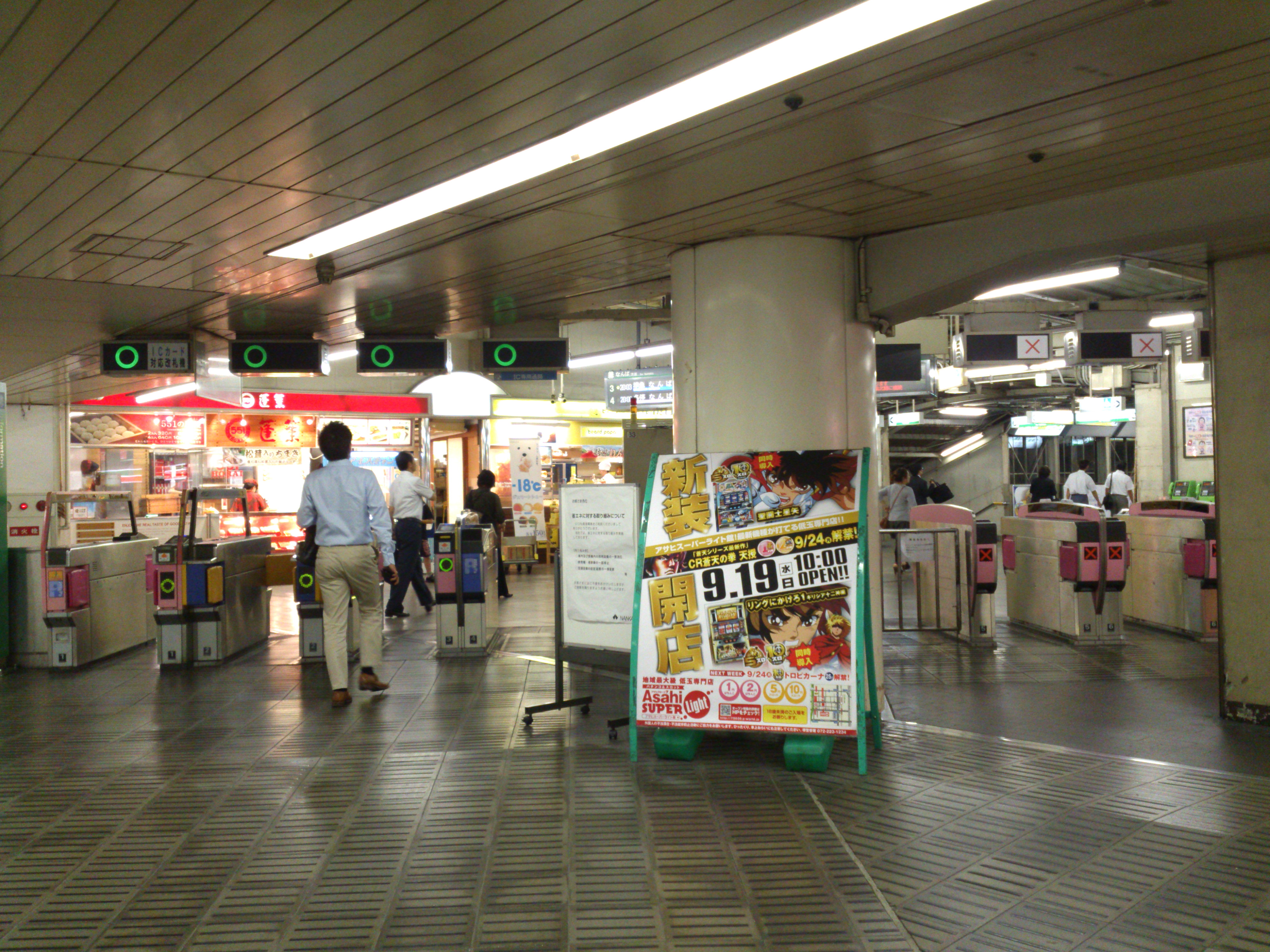
West ticket gates

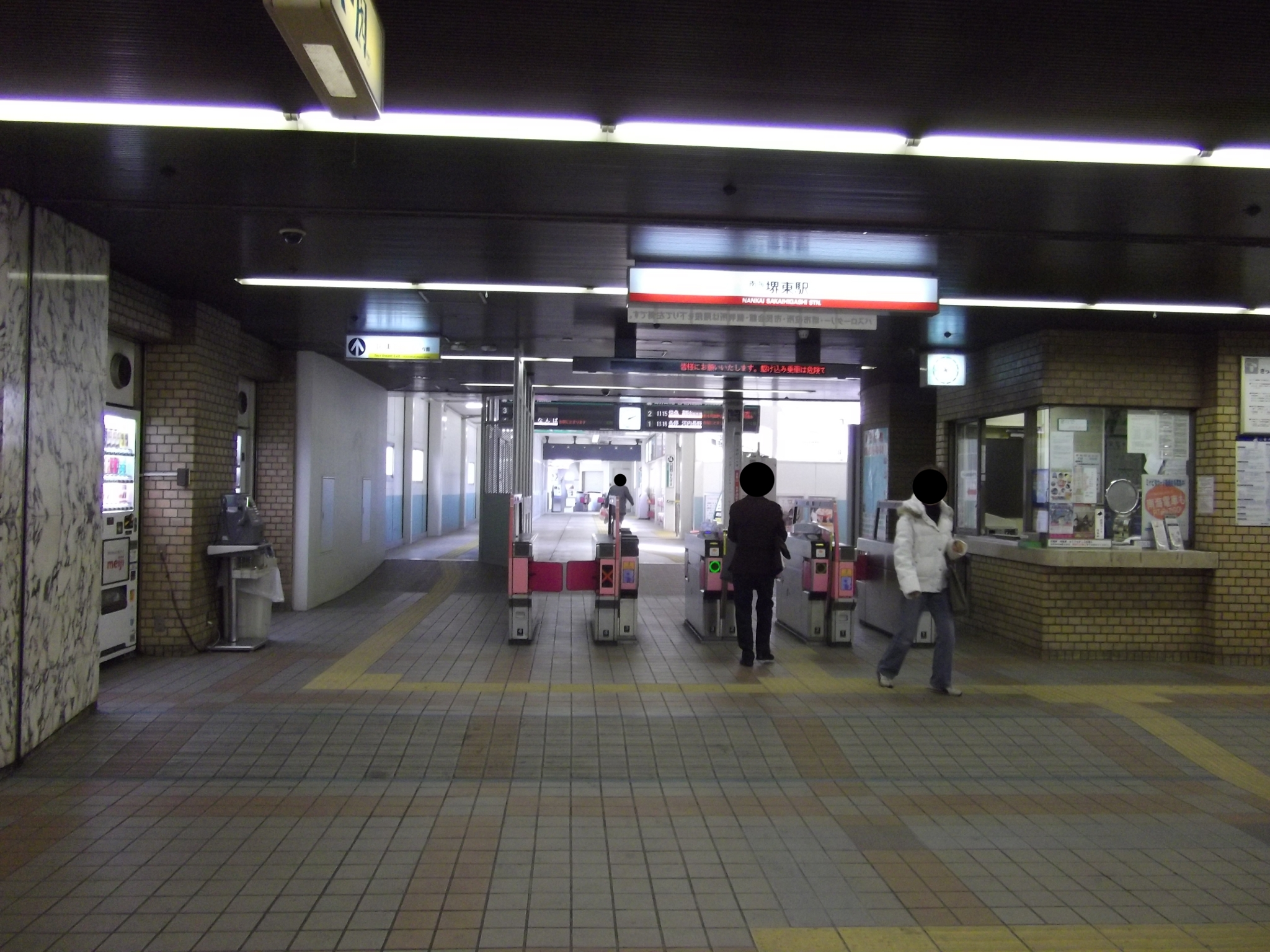
Northwest ticket gates

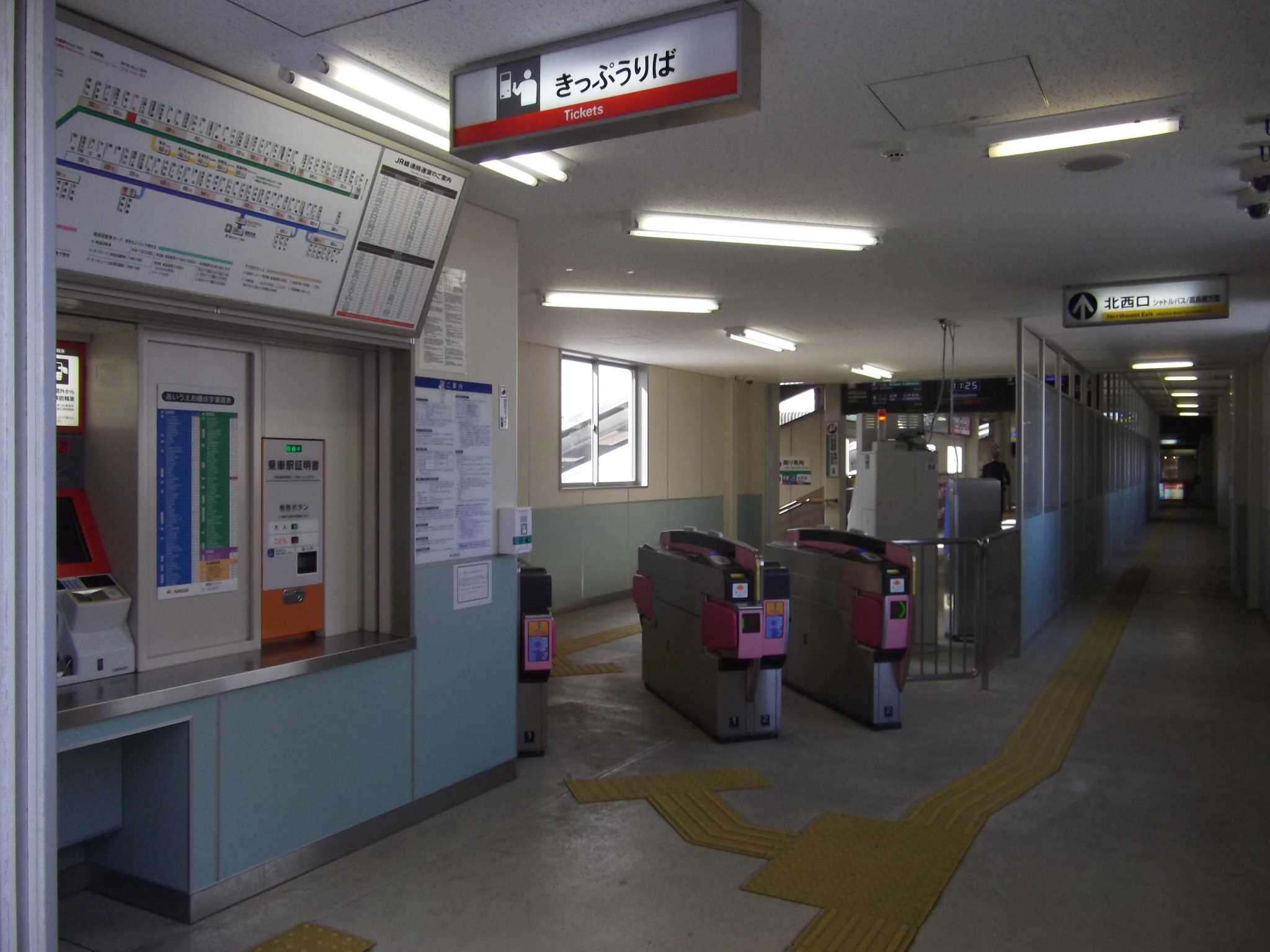
Northeast ticket gates

== Surrounding area ==
=== Public ===
- Sakai City Hall
- Sakai Ward Office
- Osaka District Court Sakai Branch, Osaka Family Court Sakai Branch, Sakai Summary Court
- Sakai Tax Office
- Sakai Post Office (Japan Post Holdings)
  - Japan Post Service Sakai
  - Japan Post Bank Sakai
  - Japan Post Insurance Sakai
- Sakaihigashi ekimae Post Office (Japan Post Holdings)

=== Market ===
- Takashimaya

=== Others ===
- Nankai Bus Terminal
- Hochigai Shrine
- Tadeiyama Kofun

== Buses ==
Sakaihigashi-ekimae (Nankai Bus)
for Oshoji and Sakai-ekimae
for Kanaoka
for Sakai City Hospital, Sagibashi and Dejima
for Kogyo-gakko-mae (Osaka Prefectural Sakai Technology High School), Sagibashi and Dejima
for Kogyo-gakko-mae, Mozu and Fukai
for Intex Osaka, Asia & Pacific Trade Center, and Osaka Prefectural Government Sakishima Building
Kansai Airport limousine "Sorae" for Kansai Airport
for Asaka, Kita-Hanada and Kawachi-Amami
for Oshoji and Ayanocho
for Kinryocho and Ayanocho
for J-GREEN Sakai
for Sakaihama Seaside Stage
Expressway buses for Shinjuku and Tokyo
Expressway buses for Takeo Onsen, Sasebo and Huis Ten Bosch
Expressway buses for Odawara, Fujisawa, Kamakura, Ofuna and Totsuka
Expressway buses for Kashiwazaki, Nagaoka and Sanjo
Expressway buses for Yokohama, Odaiba, Tokyo Disneyland and Chiba
for Sakai-eki nishiguchi and Takumicho (Sharp Sakai Factory)
for Sakaihama Seaside Stage and Sakai-eki nishiguchi
for Otori

== See also ==
- List of railway stations in Japan
