= Postage stamps and postal history of Japan =

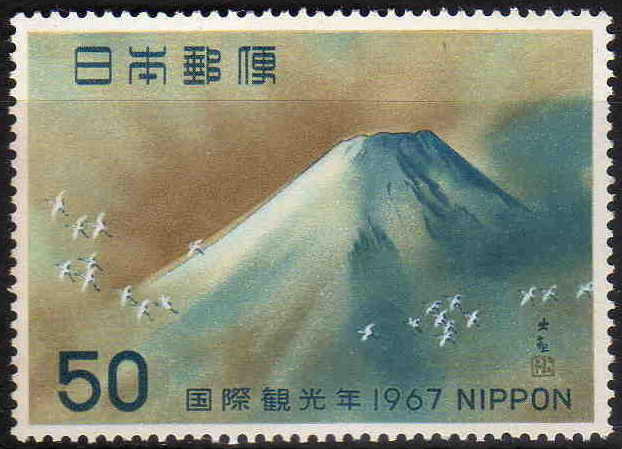
A 1967 stamp of Japan featuring a painting of Mount Fuji

The story of Japan's postal system with its postage stamps and related postal history goes back over a century. The country's first modern postal service got started in 1871, with mail professionally travelling between Kyoto and Tokyo as well as the latter city and Osaka. This took place in the midst of the rapid industrialization and social reorganization that the Meiji period symbolized in Japanese history. Given how the nation's railroad technology was in its infancy, Japan's growing postal system relied heavily on human-powered transport, including rickshaws, as well as horse-drawn methods of delivery. For example, while commemorating the 50th anniversary of Japan's postal service, the country's 1921 government released decorative postcards depicting intrepid horseback riders carrying the mail. This however was done to compare postal transport in past and present, as the other card showed modern transportation viz. rail and shipping. The railroad net from the north to the south, Aomori to Nagasaki, was completed in 1889 (Meiji 21). Prior to 1920s, local delivery was mainly by men- and horsepower, not principally different to Europe.

In terms of communications, British technicians had already been employed in assisting with Japanese lighthouses, and the country's budding mail system looked to hybridize British ideas with local practicalities. Shipping along the nation's coastline in particular demonstrates a key instance of how the Japanese economy developed: the government closely working with private companies to industrially expand in a way that met social needs while also allowing for large profits. Mitsubishi's contract for mail transport by sea proved lucrative enough that it assisted with the firm becoming one of the famous "zaibatsu".

Since 2007, the nation's post offices have been managed by the firm Japan Post Network, which is itself a part of the larger Japan Post Holdings conglomerate. As of December 2017, the smaller company has been managed by CEO Koji Furukawa. The simple Japanese postal mark (〒), introduced in 1887, is still used to this day.

== Influence of foreign post offices ==
Public posts would not be established until 1871; prior to that several nations maintained foreign post offices. The British maintained post offices in Yokohama (opened 1859), Nagasaki (1860), and Kobe (1869), all closing in December 1879. From 1864 on, the offices used stamps of Hong Kong. France had an office in Yokohama from 1865 to 1880, using French stamps. The United States opened post offices in Yokohama and Nagasaki in 1867, in Kobe in 1868, and in Hakodate in 1871, using US stamps, and closing in 1874.

== First stamps ==
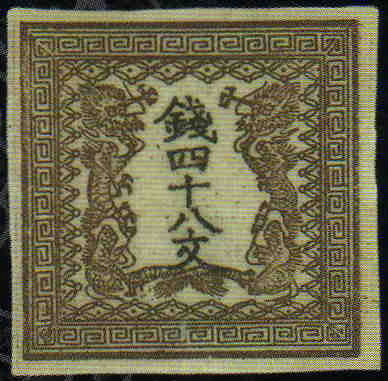
The first stamp of Japan, the Ryumon, issued in 1871

In 1870, Baron Maeshima visited London to learn the workings of the British postal system, and founded Japan's postal system in 1871. The first stamps were issued in April 1871, in a set of four covering the different postal rates; the intricate two-color design consisted of a pair of dragons facing towards the center, where the characters of value were printed in black. The denominations were in mon, which had already been superseded by the yen; the same basic design denominated in yen appeared in 1872, but was itself soon replaced by a new set of four designs featuring the imperial crest.

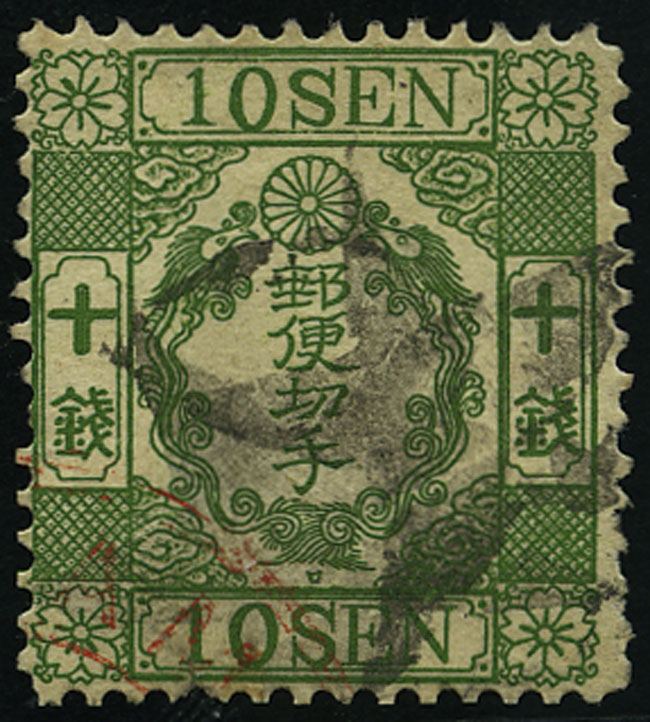
The 1872 issue

The new designs also included Latin letters for the denomination, a trend which has been generally followed since, and a chrysanthemum, which was on every Japanese stamp until 1947, in lieu of the actual visage of the emperor.

In 1876, a long definitive series was introduced, with a generally oval inner frame, and inscribed "IMPERIAL JAPANESE POST". Japan joined the UPU in 1877.

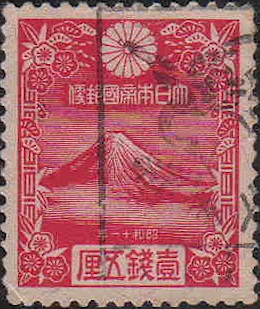
New Year's stamp, 1935

The first commemorative stamp, in 1894, marked the 25th anniversary of the wedding of Emperor Meiji and Empress Shōken. The first persons depicted were Prince Kitashirakawa Yoshihisa and Prince Arisugawa Taruhito, honored in 1896 for their role in the First Sino-Japanese War that had ended the previous year.

== Twentieth century ==
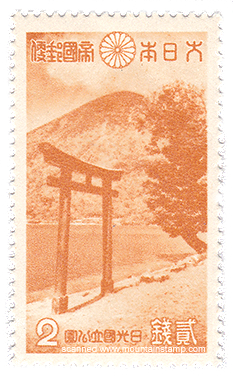
The National Parks series

1935 saw the first New Year's stamp, issued at the end of the year to pay postage on New Year's cards. It depicted Mount Fuji, as did the first of a long-running series of national parks issues, appearing in 1936.

A new definitive series in 1942 reflected Japan's entry into World War II, with designs including war workers and saluting aviators. They were superseded by a new series in 1945 and another in 1946, crudely printed and issued imperforate.

In accordance with UPU regulations, in 1966, Japanese started including the name "NIPPON" in Latin characters in addition to the Latin-character denomination.

From 1989 to 2007, prefecture stamps appeared. Although valid for postage throughout the country, the designs are specific to the prefecture and are only sold in the prefecture's postal region. From 2008, prefectural issues were available for sale nationwide. Moreover, the calligraphic style of the characters for "Japan Post" on each stamp were changed to reflect the style used in non-prefecture issues for most stamps.

The postal system was reorganized in 2003 with the creation of Japan Post.

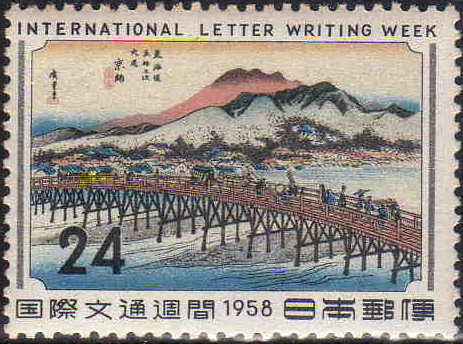
1958 International Letter Writing Week

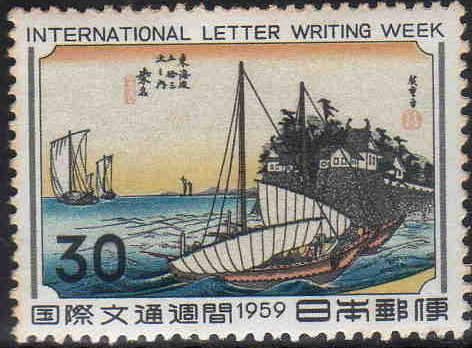
1959 International Letter Writing Week

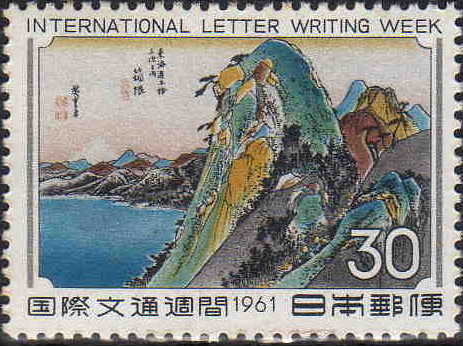
1961 International Letter Writing Week

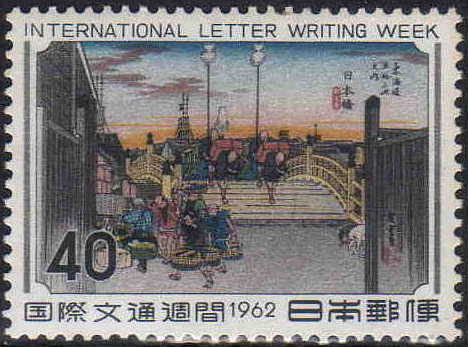
1962 International Letter Writing Week

== World War II issues ==
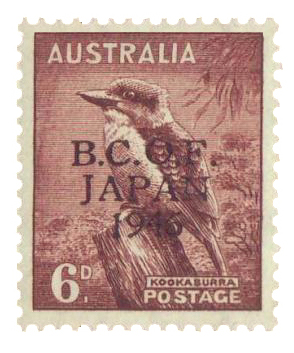
Stamp of Australia overprinted for use by British Commonwealth Occupation Force in Japan, 1946

During World War II, Japan issued a variety of overprints and new designs for its occupied territories.

=== Allied occupation ===
At the end of the war, between October 1946 and February 1949, Australian stamps overprinted "B.C.O.F. / JAPAN / 1946" were used by the British Commonwealth Occupation Force in Allied occupied Japan .

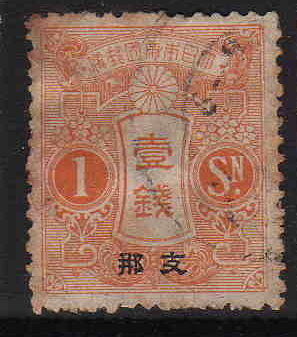
Postage stamp overprinted for use at Japanese post offices in China

== Post offices abroad ==
Japan issued stamps for use at its post offices in China (1876–1922) and Korea (1876–1905).

== Postal symbol ==
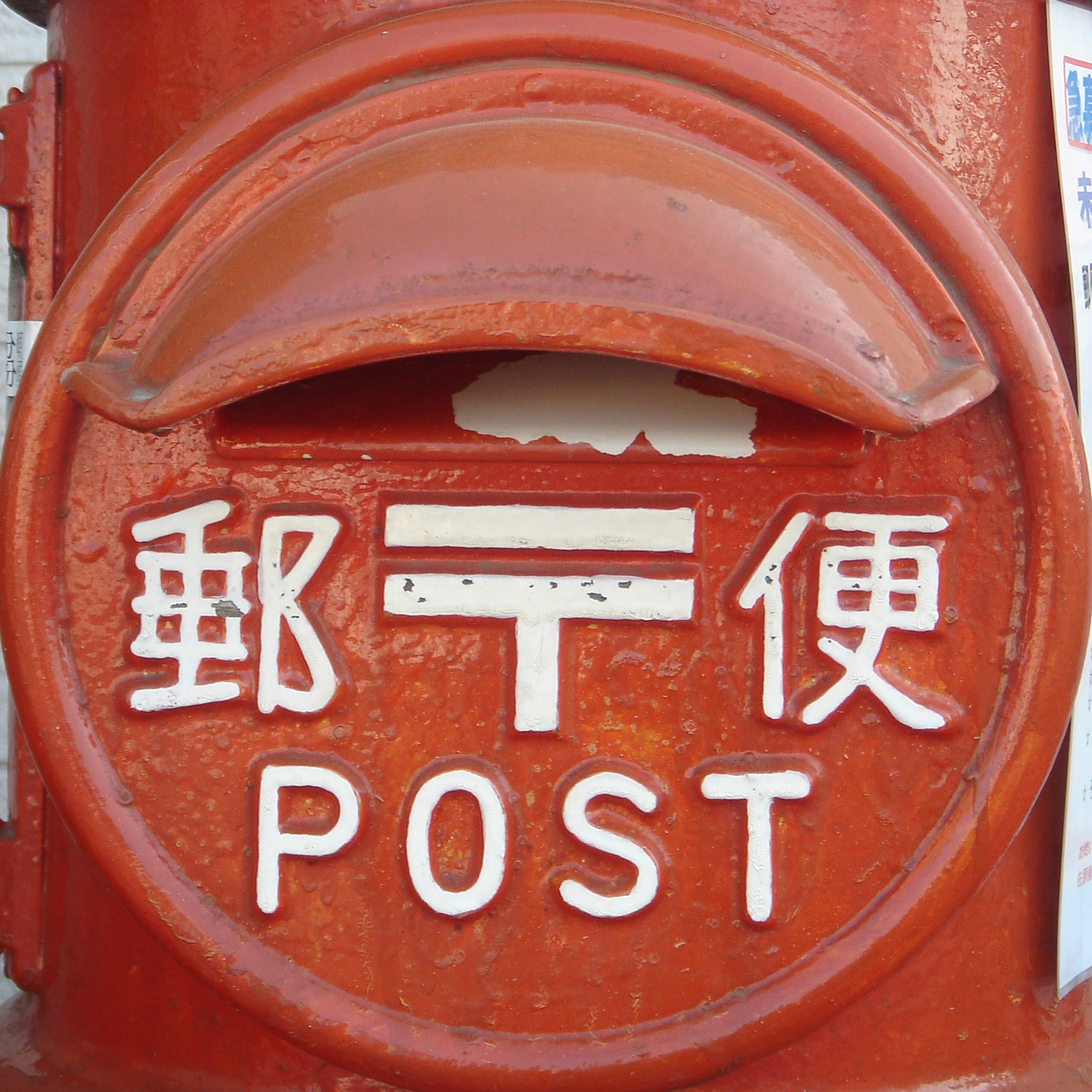
Markings on an old-fashioned Japanese mailbox

The 〒 symbol serves as the Japanese postal code mark, designed a stylized katakana te (テ). This is used on the signs of post offices, on post boxes, and before the postal code on envelopes and packages. It is derived from the Japanese word teishin (逓信; "communications").

The symbol can be obtained by typing "yuubin" on an keyboard with a Japanese IME and converting it. There are several variant forms of this symbol in Unicode, including a form in a circle, 〶 (Unicode U+3036), which is the official Geographical Survey Institute of Japan map symbol for a post office. The emoji 🏣 (Unicode U+1F3E3) is also present, representing a Japanese post office with the symbol appearing on the pictured building.

〠 (Unicode U+3020) was a mascot character of Japan Post named Number-kun (ナンバーくん, Nanbā-kun), designed by Noboru Matsuno and Tsunehisa Kimura in 1968 along with the launch of postal codes in Japan. A similar character also including the symbol, Poston (ポストン, Posuton), was introduced in 1998 to promote the use of new seven-digit postal codes, superseding Number-kun. With the privitization and formation of Japan Post Service, both former mascots have now been retired and replaced with a new character, Posukuma (ぽすくま), a teddy bear mail carrier who wears a hat bearing the symbol.

== See also ==
- Communications in Japan
- Postage stamps and postal history of Ryukyu Islands

== Sources ==
- Stanley Gibbons Ltd: various catalogues
- Mackay, James. A. The World Encyclopedia of Stamps and Stamp Collecting. Lorenz Books, 2005. ISBN 0-7548-1530-7
- Rossiter, Stuart & John Flower. The Stamp Atlas. London: Macdonald, 1986. ISBN 0-356-10862-7
