= Postal service privatization =

Several countries have undergone or are in various stages of privatizing their national postal service:

== Germany ==
- DHL Group (Deutsche Post)

Privatized in 2000. As of early 2005, 20% of outstanding shares were owned by the German government through the KfW-Bankengruppe.

== Portugal ==
- CTT Correios de Portugal, S.A.

CTT has become a public limited company in 1991, and in December 2013 the shares were listed on Euronext Lisbon.

== Japan ==
- Japan Post

Japan Post was created in April 1, 2003 as a government-owned corporation as their first step toward complete privatization of their postal system under the leadership of the pro-business conservative Liberal Democratic Party who generally advocates smaller government and reducing the size of government debt.

On January 23, 2006, Japan Post Holdings Co., Ltd. was created as the holding company of separate entities of the government-owned postal system including postal savings and insurance.

In 2007, a series of steps were taken for smooth transition of privatization.

On September 10, 2007, the Prime Minister authorized the start of complete privatization of Japan Post under a smooth transition plan.
On September 28, 2007, all sales of postal services were halted temporarily.
On September 30, 2007, all the ATMs for Japan Post banking services were shut down and marked the end of government ran postal system in Japan.
On October 1, 2007, a new dawn of privatized postal corporation was begun with Japan Post Holdings as the stock holding company of three new companies that day, Japan Post Co., Ltd., Japan Post Bank Co., Ltd., and Japan Post Insurance Co., Ltd.

Further plans were in place to move to the second phase of privatization by selling off government-owned shares and IPO in the Tokyo Stock Exchange. However, the proposal faced fierce opposition by the opposition party coalition of the centre-left Social Democratic Party and the Democratic Party. These plans were put on hold in as the opposition won the 2009 Japanese general election by running on the platform against the IPO of Japan Post. However, by the end of 2011, the popularity of the opposition party took a nosedive due to the poor government response to the 2011 Tōhoku earthquake and tsunami, and the conservative LDP won the parliamentary elections in the 2012 Japanese general election. A complete reversal of public opinion regarding postal privatization ensued as the LDP moved forward with their former plans to IPO, with the promise of a portion of profits and proceeds from the first IPO will go to aid the victims and rebuilding of the Tohoku earthquake.

Japan Post began their IPO at the Tokyo Stock Exchange on November 4, 2015, and its stock surged 26% on what was noted to be the largest IPO offering in the Tokyo Stock Exchange at that time, with the Japanese government selling off their first round of shares, raising $11 billion for earthquake aid. The second round of the Japanese government sold of additional $12 billion of shares in September 2017.

The process of complete privatization of Japan Post is undergoing as the Japanese government continues to sell off their shares in subsequent sales. The privatization has led to more openness of bookkeeping, accounting methods and detailed fiscal result becoming readily accessible to the public through Japan Post's corporate profiles.

However, in December 2019 Japan Post Holdings and its subsidiaries were revealed to be involved in a large-scale illegal insurance sales scam targeting elder customers. The president and CEO of Japan Post Holdings, Masatsugu Nagato, along with the President of Japan Post Insurance, Mitsuhiko Uehira, and the president of Japan Post, Kunio Yokoyama, were forced to resign due to public pressure. The stock price plummeted and the Japanese government announced to delay the privatization process by 5 years.

== United Kingdom ==
- Royal Mail

Following the Postal Services Act 2011, shares in Royal Mail were floated on the London Stock Exchange in 2013. The UK government sold its remaining shares in 2015, ending 499 years of state ownership.
