= Communications in Japan =

Japanese government body of communication

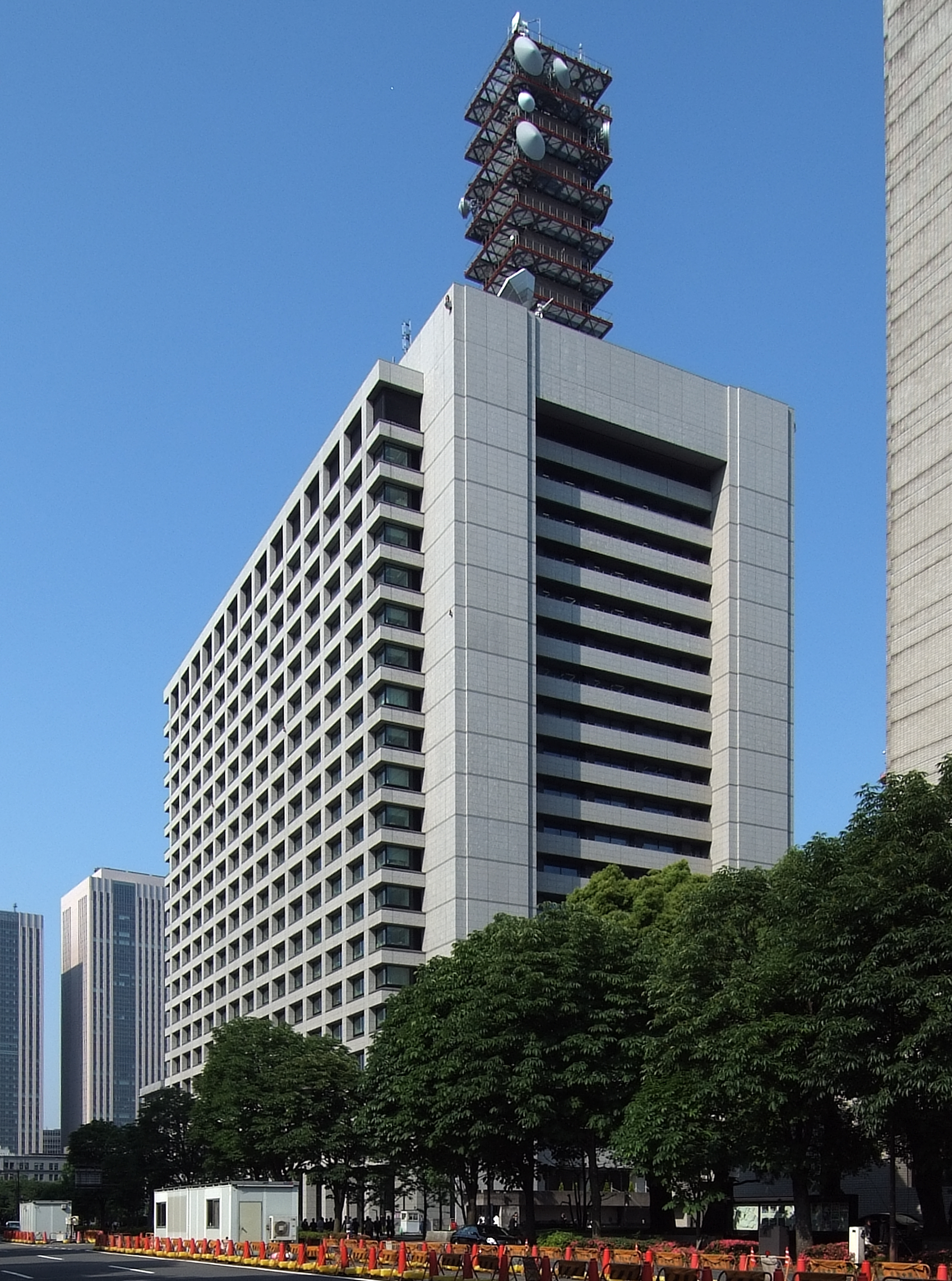
This Tokyo complex houses the Ministry of Internal Affairs and Communications, which administers Japanese cellphone networks while also providing many other services.

Japan has one of the world's most modern communication networks, with strong mobile and internet growth. In 2008, 75 million Japanese consumers (82% of all internet users) used mobile phones to access the Internet. The country's communication infrastructure includes significant telephone and IP services, broadband internet uptake, and major mobile networks run by NTT Docomo, KDDI, SoftBank, and Rakuten Mobile. Founded on early postal innovations and impacted by worldwide technical advances, Japan's communication landscape is constantly modernizing and vital to its social and economic progress.

== Overview of communication services ==
=== Telephone services ===
Telephones and ISDN – main lines in use: 52.3981 million (2007)

IP phone lines in use: 16.766 million (2007)

Mobile and PHS lines in use: 105.297 million (2007)

international: satellite earth stations – 5 Intelsat (4 Pacific Ocean and 1 Indian Ocean), 1 Intersputnik (Indian Ocean region), and 1 Inmarsat (Pacific and Indian Ocean regions); submerged cables to China, Philippines, Russia, and US (via Guam)

==== Mobile phone services ====
There are four nationwide mobile phone service providers: NTT Docomo, KDDI, SoftBank, and Rakuten Mobile.

=== Radio and television broadcasting ===
Radio broadcast stations: AM 190, FM 88, shortwave 24 (1999)

Radios: 120.5 million (1997)

Television broadcast stations: 7,108 (plus 441 repeaters; note – in addition, US Forces are served by 3 TV stations and 2 TV cable services) (1999)

Televisions: 86.5 million (1997)

Amateur radio: 446,602 licensed stations as of October 2011. See Amateur radio call signs of Japan.

=== Internet services ===
- Internet service providers (ISPs): 357 (1999)
- Internet service providers via Cable network: 334 (June 2004)
- Number of Portable Phone Users with the Internet Access: 71,044,000 (June 2004)

Number of Broadband Users by Access (April 2005)

- Number of the xDSL Users: 13,675,840 lines
- Number of the FTTH Users: 2,852,205 lines
- Number of the CATV Service Users: 2,959,712 lines

Number of Broadband Users by Access (June 2004)

- Number of the xDSL Users: 12,068,718 lines
- Number of the FTTH Users: 1,417,483 lines
- Number of the CATV Service Users: 2,702,000 lines
- Number of the Dial-up Users: 17,730,000 lines

Number of Broadband Users by Access (June 2002)

- Number of the xDSL Users: 3,300,926 lines
- Number of the FTTH Users: 84,903 lines
- Number of the CATV Service Users: 1852000 lines
- Number of the Dial-up Users: 20,390,000 lines

Country code (Top-level domain): JP

=== Postal services ===
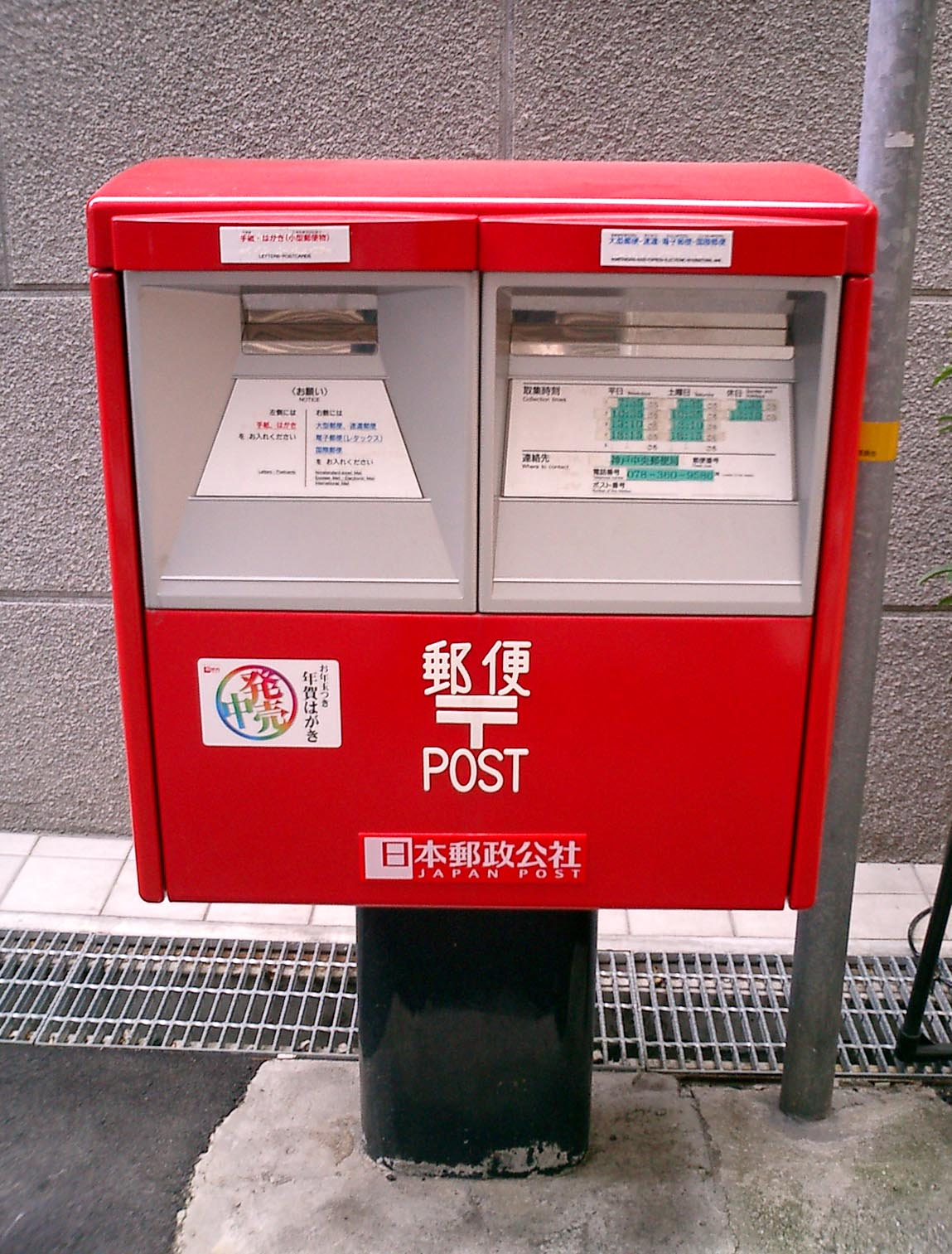
A postbox in Japan as pictured in 2005. Note the double-bar symbol, the country's postal mark, on the front.

Japan's first modern postal service got started in 1871, with mail professionally traveling between Kyoto and Tokyo as well as the latter city and Osaka. This took place in the midst of the rapid industrialization and social reorganization that the Meiji period symbolized in Japanese history. Given how the nation's railroad technology was in its infancy, Japan's growing postal system relied heavily on human-powered transport, including rickshaws, as well as horse-drawn methods of delivery. For example, while commemorating the 50th anniversary of Japan's postal service, the country's 1921 government released decorative postcards depicting intrepid horseback riders carrying the mail.

In communication terms, British technicians had already been employed in assisting with Japanese lighthouses, and the country's budding mail system looked to hybridize British ideas with local practicalities. Shipping along the nation's coastline in particular demonstrates a key instance of how the Japanese economy developed: the government closely working with private companies to industrially expand in a way that met social needs while also allowing for large profits. Mitsubishi's contract for mail transport by sea proved lucrative enough that it assisted with the firm becoming one of the famous "zaibatsu".

Since 2007, the nation's post offices have been managed by the firm Japan Post Network, which, in turn, is a part of the larger Japan Post Holdings conglomerate. As of December 2017, the smaller company has been managed by CEO Koji Furukawa. The simple Japanese postal mark, predating mass literacy in the nation, is still used to this day.

== General background and history ==
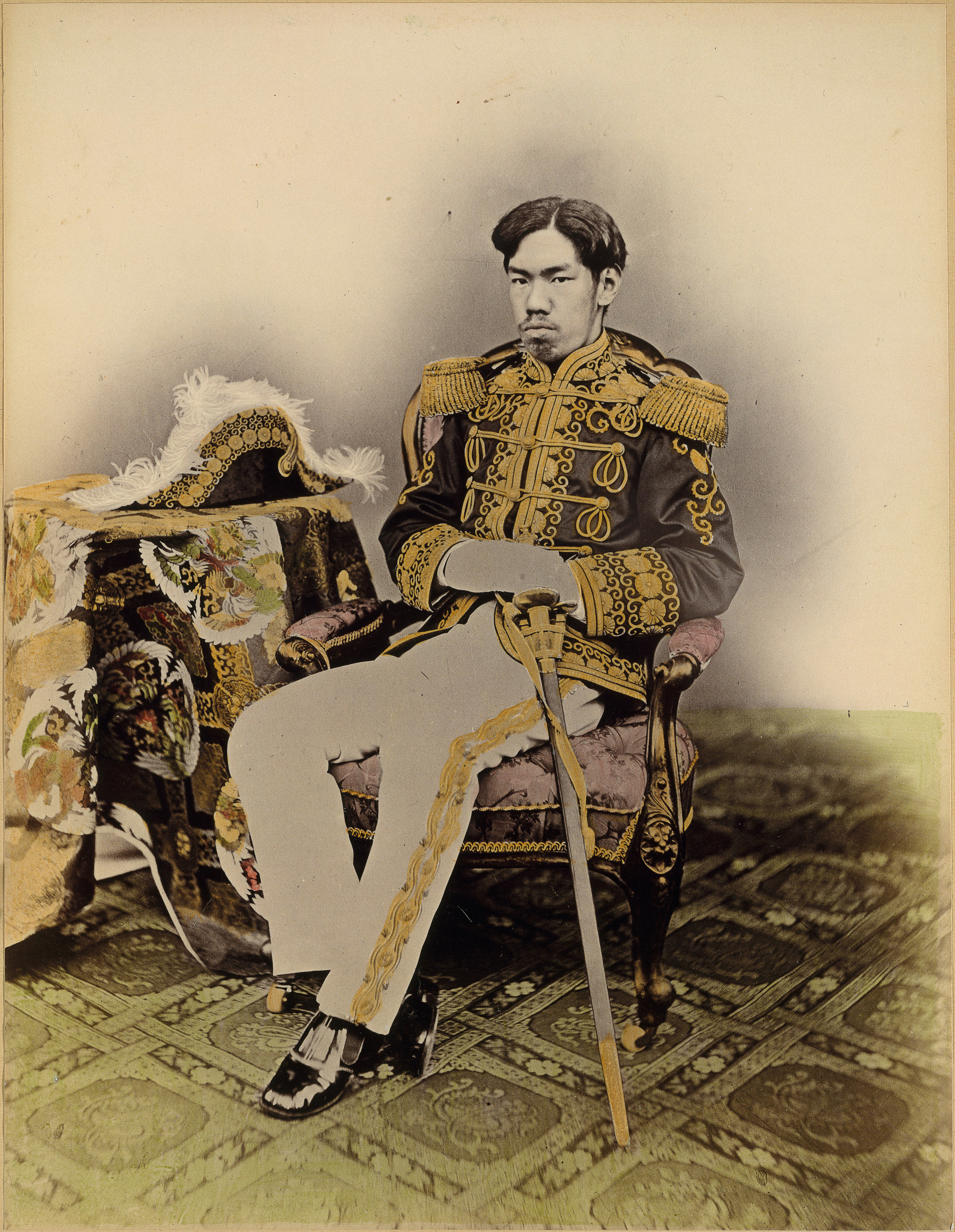
Emperor Meiji, photographed in military dress by Uchida Kuichi, presided over a time of massive industrialization, with the Meiji period establishing the roots of modern Japanese communications.

An example of the dawn of modern Japanese communications is the shift in newspaper publication. News vendors of the Tokugawa period, taking place from 1603 to 1867, typically promoted publications by reading the contents aloud and handed out papers that were printed from hand-graven blocks. Widespread adoption of movable type took place as Japanese society modernized. In particular, Yomiuri Shimbun, a national daily newspaper that became the country's largest by circulation, was founded in 1874 and designed to be read in detail using standard Japanese vernacular. Five such dailies got started early in the Meiji period, taking place from 1868 to 1912. Yomiuri specifically took direct influence from American publications controlled by William Randolph Hearst.

The first such mass newspaper to be founded was the Nagasaki Shipping List & Advertiser, established in 1861 in Nagasaki by the Englishman A.W. Hansard. Its first issue ran 22 June of that year. The newspaper, which notably discussed matters in the English language, laid the groundwork for Hansard's later publication Japan Herald.

The broadcast industry has been dominated by the Japan Broadcasting Corporation (Nippon Hoso Kyokai—NHK) since its founding in 1925.

In the postwar period, NHK's budget and operations were under the purview of the Ministry of Posts and Telecommunications, the Broadcasting Law of 1950 provides for independent management and programming by NHK. Television broadcasting began in 1953, and color television was introduced in 1960. Cable television was introduced in 1969. In 1978 an experimental broadcast satellite with two color television channels was launched. Operational satellites for television use were launched between 1984 and 1990. Television viewing spread so rapidly that, by 1987, 99 percent of Japan's households had color television sets and the average family had its set on at least five hours a day. Starting in 1987, NHK began full-scale experimental broadcasting on two channels using satellite-to-audience signals, thus bringing service to remote and mountainous parts of the country that earlier had experienced poor reception. The new system also provided twenty-four hours a day, nonstop service.

In the late 1980s, NHK operated two public television and three radio networks nationally, producing about 1,700 programs per week. Its general and education programs were broadcast through more than 6,900 television stations and nearly 330 AM and more than 500 FM radio transmitting stations. Comprehensive service in 17 languages is available throughout the world.

Rapid improvements, innovations, and diversification in communications technology, including optical fiber cables, communications satellites, and fax machines, led to rapid growth of the communications industry in the 1980s. Nippon Telegraph and Telephone Corporation, owned by the government until 1985, had dominated the communications industry until April 1985, when new common carriers, including Daini Denden, were permitted to enter the field. NTT Worldwide Telecommunications Corp (Kokusai Denshin Denwa Company, commonly known as KDD, now part of KDDI Inc.) lost its monopoly hold on international communications activities in 1989, when Nihon Kokusai Tsushin and other private overseas communications firms began operations.

In 1992 Japan also had more than 12,000 televisions stations, and the country had more than 350 radio stations, 300 AM radio stations and 58 FM. Broadcasting innovations in the 1980s included sound multiplex (two-language or stereo) broadcasting, satellite broadcasting, and in 1985 the University of the Air and teletext services were inaugurated.

Japan has been the world leader in telecommunications in the 1980s, but this position that has been challenged by the United States' dot-com industry in the 1990s and the emerging tiger states in Asia. While the United States is leading in digital content, South Korea is leading in broadband access, India is leading in software, and Taiwan is leading in research and development.

Japan went into the 21st century after achieving widespread saturation with telecommunication devices. For instance, by 2008 the government's Internal Affairs and Communications Ministry stated that about 75 million people used mobile phones to access the Internet, accounting for about 82% of individual internet users.

== See also ==
- Economy of Japan
  - Economic history of Japan
