= ICOM IC-7110 =

Amateur radio transceiver

The ICOM IC-7110 is an announced multimode MF/HF/VHF/UHF mobile amateur radio transceiver. The IC-7110 will have support for a wide variety of commonly used amateur radio modes, including DSTAR, the digital voice mode from JARL, the Japan Amateur Radio League.

Previously known under its code name X-026, the IC-7110 will serve as the successor to the ICOM IC-7100 and will have a large detachable control head with a slanted display so the transmitter can be installed elsewhere in a vehicle or home. The transceiver will also support RS-BA1 remote operation.

Announced at the 2026 Tokyo Ham Fair on August 29, 2026, an official release schedule has not yet been provided.

== Features ==
Announced features of the ICOM IC-7110:

- Bands covered: MF/HF, 50, 144, 430, and 440 MHz bands in all modes. Also the 70 MHz band in the European version.
- Real-time spectrum scope and waterfall display.
- CW decoder
- D-STAR functionality
- 4.3" color display with touch operation
- Dualwatch for HF/VHF and HF/UHF
- Simple configuration for FT8 operation
- Wi-Fi and Bluetooth connectivity
