= Jiro Saito =

Jiro Saito may refer to:

- Jiro Saito (voice actor) (斉藤 次郎; born 1965), Japanese voice actor
- Jiro Saito (businessman) (斎藤 次郎; born 1936), Japanese official and businessman
