= Taizo Nishimuro =

Japanese businessman (1935–2017)

Taizō Nishimuro
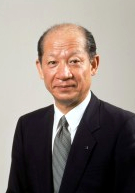
- Born: 10 December 1935; Tsuru, Yamanashi Prefecture, Japan
- Died: 18 October 2017 (aged 81)
- Education: Keio University (BEc in 1961)
- Title: Former president and CEO, Japan Post Holdings
- Term: ?–2016
- Successor: Masatsugu Nagato

Taizō Nishimuro (西室 泰三, Nishimuro Taizō); 19 December 1935 – 18 October 2017) was a Japanese businessman, the president and chief executive officer (CEO) of Japan Post Holdings, a Japanese state-owned conglomerate, the 26th largest company in the world, and a Fortune Global 500 company.

== Overviews ==
Nishimuro earned a bachelor's degree in economics from Keio University in 1961.

He joined Toshiba (then Tokyo Shibaura Denki) after graduation, rising to chairman in 2000.

He received the Legion of Honour officer award in 2015.

Following his hospitalization in February 2016, he was succeeded as CEO by Masatsugu Nagato, who had been president and CEO of Japan Post Bank.

Nishimuro's death was reported on 18 October 2017. He was 81.
