= Digital divide in Japan =

Differences in access to information technologies

The digital divide in Japan refers to inequalities between individuals, households, and other groups of different demographic and socioeconomic levels in Japan in access to information and communication technologies ("ICTs") and in the knowledge and skills needed to effectively use the information gained from connecting.

The digital divide in Japan is the disparity of access to the Internet by the population of Japan. Multiple factors influence this divide. Cultural aspects of Japanese people contribute to the digital divide in the nation. Contributing cultural factors to the digital divide present in Japan are closing over time. Groups shown to be improving access include women and the elderly. 97.1% of the households in Japan have Internet access at home while 81% of the households in Japan have personal computers.

The 2015 population census of Japan was released. There are about 16 million people under 15 years of age, which is 12.6% of the total population. There are 76 million people aged 15–64 years of age, which is 60.7% of the total population, and there are 3.3 million people who are 65 years of age or older, which is 26.6% of the total population.

== Cultural cause ==
According to the Japanese Statistics Bureau, MPHPA, and World Internet Project Japan, in 2001, 44% of the population was online, and 41% of that group were females. Additionally, figures point to declining disparity among internet access in various socioeconomic classes and gender. Additionally, figures show that younger Japanese individuals use the internet as compared to older Japanese individuals. All gaps are shown to be narrowing. A study produced at the University of Buffalo shows that the Japanese consider advanced ICTs a common commodity, not as necessary for advancement.

The Philippine Information Literacy website, which had an article based on a forum hosted by ASEAN and Japan about media and information literacy, held a two-day event that discussed “how the youth should cope with the rapidly growing world online—particularly the rise of social media—and how they could protect themselves from its hazards.” It also informed the audience about the advantages of technology and how telecommunications has taken over.

== Population ==
Japan is divided into territorial divisions and depending on which geographic area that you live in, and everyone either has internet or no one has internet.

According to the Ministry of Internal Affairs and Communications, there are a total of 39 “Zero Broadband Areas” in Japan. This is where there is no broadband access for even a single household within the district. This means Japanese citizens cannot get broadband even if they wanted to because there is no broadband infrastructure in their neighborhood. For some territorial divisions the coverage is up to 99.8% of the people in this area have access to broadband. This leads to a digital divide, but the divide is more drastic at the ends of the curve depending on where you live.

The Ministry of Internal Affairs and Communications is aiming to improve broadband penetration in remote areas of Japan, but businesses aren't exactly queuing up to provide expensive infrastructure to hook up remote islands and mountain villages. Japan has more than 4000 islands, 260 of which are inhabited. Japan's land is also 73% mountainous or hilly, and whilst the population is concentrated mainly in the alluvial plains and coastal areas, there are significant populations living in remote valleys deep in the mountains mainly engaged in agriculture or forestry. It is difficult to justify building out a fiber-based infrastructure to a remote island, or to a dead end mountain ravine community miles from anywhere.

== Possible solutions ==
The internet users in Japan are increasing at an exponential rate but there are still areas demographically do not receive optimal broadband satellite communications in Japan. A possible solution for this is to launch more satellites for those areas. Globally separated into categories of 58% female (most pronounced in Africa, Arab states and Asia-Pacific), 60% rural, poor, illiterate and elderly are offline. ITU provides idea/plans for these focus groups to increase the amount of internet users. Rural areas need to implement a low-cost, given the lower household income is lower in these areas, another idea for rural areas is to provide public buildings with internet access.
