= ICOM IC-7100 =

Amateur radio transceiver

The ICOM IC-7100 is a multimode HF/VHF/UHF mobile amateur radio transceiver. The IC-7100 has support for a wide variety of commonly used amateur radio modes, including ICOM's proprietary digital voice mode, DSTAR. Additionally, the radio offers 100 watts on HF, 50 watts on VHF, and 35 watts on UHF. The IC-7100 is unique in that it has a large detachable control head with a slanted display, so the transmitter can be installed elsewhere in a vehicle or home. The receiver used in the IC-7100 is a triple conversion superheterodyne, and has excellent DSP and audio filters. The IC-7100 allows for connection to a computer over USB, which enables the radio to be used for popular digital modes such as FT8, Winlink, and packet operation. Locations of nearby repeaters and sending APRS locations can be done with an optional GPS receiver attachment. The IC-7100 notably lacks an internal antenna tuner. Most lower middle tier rigs of this caliber manufactured by Icom, Yaesu, Kenwood and others do not include an internal automatic antenna tuner.

The transceiver was first manufactured in 2013. ICOM announced a new MF/HF/VHF/UHF mobile transceiver, the IC-7110 at the 2026 Tokyo Ham Fair.

== Specifications ==
Specifications of the ICOM IC-7100:

- Frequency range: Tx: 1.8 – 450 MHz (amateur bands only) Rx: 30 kHz – 199.999 MHz and 400-470 MHz
- Modes of emission: A1A (CW), A3E (AM), J3E (LSB, USB), F3E (FM), F7W (D-STAR voice/data)
- Impedance: SO-239 50 ohms, unbalanced
- Supply voltage: 13.8 VDC external
- Current consumption: Rx: 1.5 A Tx: 22 A
- Case size (WxHxD): 200×83.5×82 mm; 7.9×3.3×3.2 in
- Weight (approx.): 2.3 kg; 5.0 lb
- Output power: 100 watts on HF, 50 watts on VHF, and 35 watts on UHF
