= Masatsugu Nagato =

Japanese businessman (born 1948)

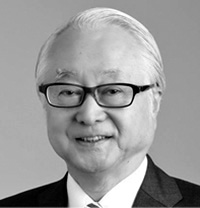
- Masatsugu Nagato
- Born: 18 November 1948 (age 77); Otaru, Hokkaido, Japan
- Education: Hitotsubashi University; Fletcher School of Law and Diplomacy
- Occupation: Businessman
- Known for: President and CEO of Japan Post Holdings
- Term: 2016–2020
- Predecessor: Taizo Nishimuro
- Successor: Hiroya Masuda

Masatsugu Nagato (born 18 November 1948) is a Japanese businessman who was the president and CEO of Japan Post Holdings from 2016 to 2020, having previously been president and CEO of Japan Post Bank.
