= Japan Post Insurance =

Japanese life insurance company

Japan Post Insurance Co., Ltd.

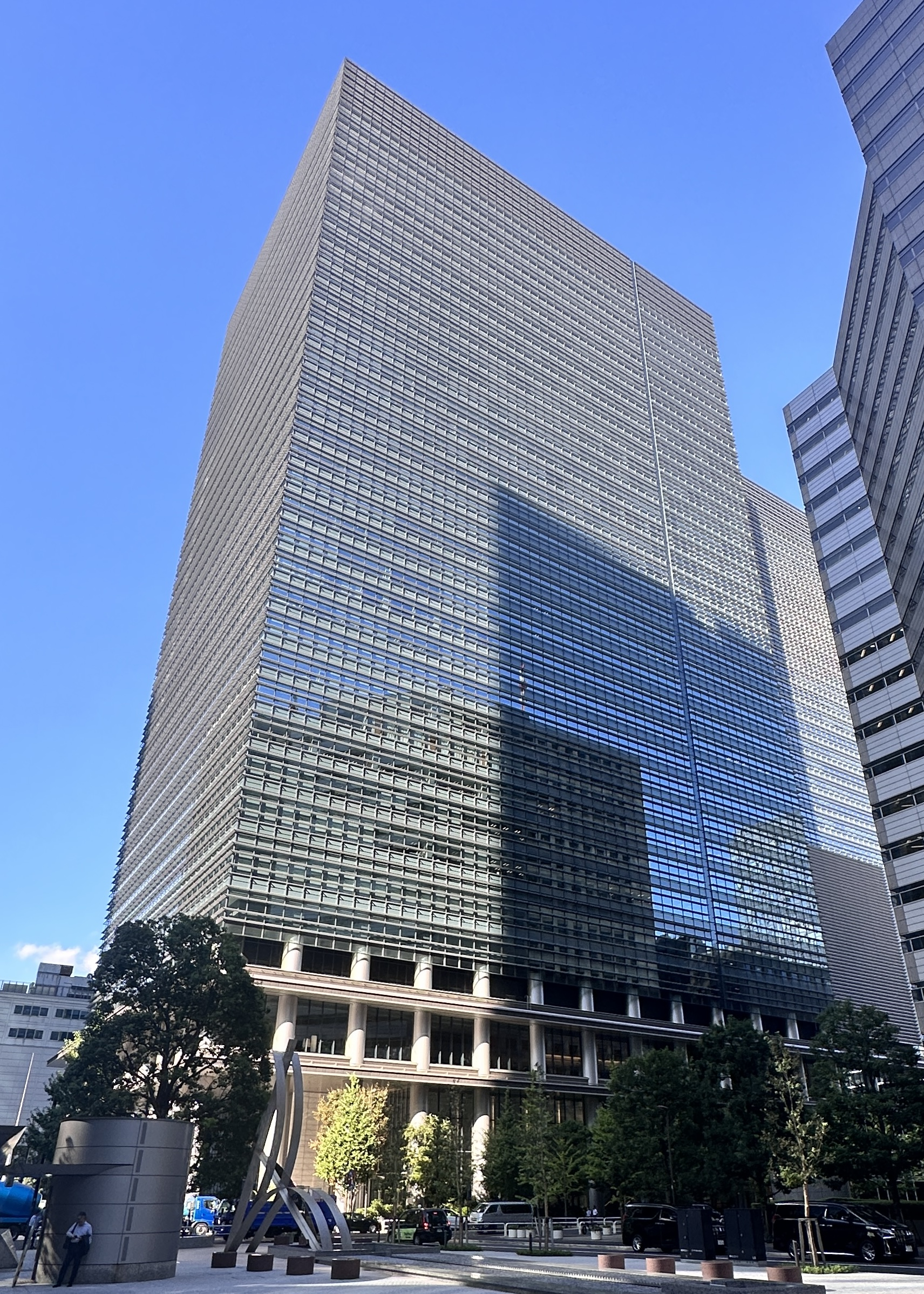
- Headquarters in Ōtemachi, Chiyoda, Tokyo
- Company type: Public subsidiary
- Traded as: TYO: 7181
- Industry: Insurance
- Founded: 2006, or establishment of the Postal Life Insurance Services (Kan'i Hoken/Kampo) in 1916
- Founder: Government of Prime Minister Junichiro Koizumi
- Headquarters: Tokyo, Japan
- Key people: Kunio Tanigaki (president); Toru Onishi (Deputy president)
- Number of employees: 5,400
- Parent: Japan Post Holdings (64.48%)
- Website: www.jp-life.japanpost.jp

The Japan Post Insurance Company, Ltd. (株式会社かんぽ生命保険, Kabushiki gaisha Kampo Sēmē Hoken), is a Japanese life insurer that was established on October 1, 2007, with the privatization of Japan Post Life Insurance (簡易保険, Kan'i Hoken; lit. "Simple Insurance"). It is owned by the Japan Post Holdings. As of 2011, it was the world's fourth largest insurance company as regards net premiums written behind three European insurers and the largest as regards non-banking assets.

On November 4, 2015, Japan Post Insurance (TYO: 7181) was listed on the Tokyo Stock Exchange as part of a "triple IPO" (initial public offering) with shares offered as well in Japan Post Holdings (TYO: 6178) and in Japan Post Bank (TYO: 7182). About 10% of the shares in each company was offered.

== History ==
On September 1, 2006, the company started as the "preparation company (準備会社)". On October 1, 2007, it started with the division and privatization of Japan Post.

In December 2019, Japan Post Holdings and Japan Post Insurance were revealed to be involved in a large-scale illegal insurance sales scam targeting elder customers. The president and CEO of Japan Post Holdings, Masatsugu Nagato, along with the president of Japan Post Insurance, Mitsuhiko Uehira, and the president of Japan Post, Kunio Yokoyama, were forced to resign due to public pressure. The stock price plummeted and the Japanese government announced to delay the privatization process by 5 years.

== See also ==
- Japan Post Holdings - a holding company of Japan Post Group.
