= Postage stamps and postal history of Ryukyu Islands =

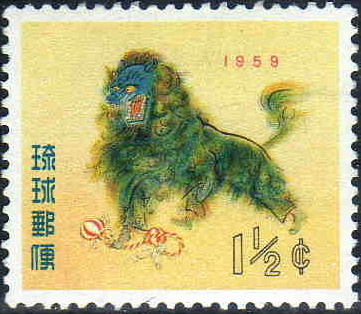
New Year's stamp of the Ryukyu Island for 1959

This is a survey of the postage stamps and postal history of the Ryukyu Islands.

The Ryukyu Islands are a chain of islands in the western Pacific Ocean, on the eastern limit of the East China Sea and to the southwest of the island of Kyushu in Japan. The largest of the islands is Okinawa Island.

The Ryukyu Kingdom was formally annexed by the Empire of Japan in 1872, although the kingdom had been part of the feudal Satsuma Domain in Kyushu since the 1609 invasion. During World War II, following the Battle of Okinawa, the islands came under the occupation of the United States military in 1945, and a civilian government was set up under American control in 1952. The islands reverted to the control of Japan in 1972.

== First stamps ==
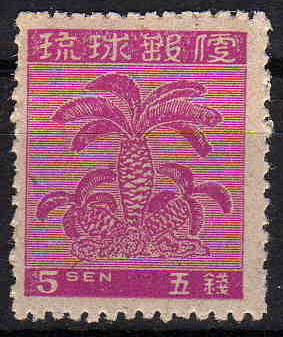
First Ryukyu Island definitive stamp, 1948

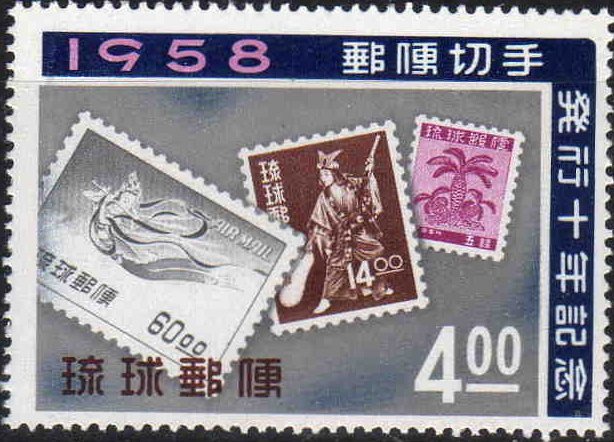
10th anniversary of first Ryukyu postage stamp, 1958

The first definitive stamps of the Ryukyu Islands were issued on July 1, 1948, and the first commemorative stamps were issued on February 12, 1951.

The final Ryukyu Island stamp was a commemorative stamp issued on April 20, 1972, after which time stamps of Japan were valid.

== See also ==
- Postage stamps and postal history of Japan
