= Masaharu Ikuta =

Japanese businessman (1935–2023)

Masaharu Ikuta (生田 正治, Ikuta Masaharu, January 19, 1935 – November 13, 2023) was a Japanese businessman from Kobe.

Ikuta graduated from Keio University in 1957. He was the CEO of Mitsui O.S.K. Lines, and served as the president of the Japan Postal Agency 2003 to March 2007. He was named the honorary consul to the Republic of Mauritius in 2002, and he was a member of the Trilateral Commission. Since 1998 he served as an independent non-executive director of Dah Sing Financial Holdings Ltd.

Ikuta died on November 13, 2023, at the age of 88.
