= Call signs in Japan =

Call signs in Japan are unique identifiers for telecommunications and broadcasting.

== Call sign blocks for telecommunication ==
The International Telecommunication Union has assigned Japan the following call sign blocks for all radio communication, broadcasting or transmission:

Call sign block
JAA–JSZ
7JA–7NZ
8JA–8NZ

While not directly related to call signs, the International Telecommunication Union (ITU) further has divided all countries assigned amateur radio prefixes into three regions; Japan is located in ITU Region 3. The ITU and CQ Magazine have divided these regions into zones. The main islands of Japan are in ITU Zone 45 and CQ Zone 25. Outlying islands can have differing zones, see the following table:

Island(s)	ITU Zone	CQ Zone
main islands and Okinawa	45	25
Ogasawara Islands	45	27
Okino Torishima	45	27
Minami Torishima	90	27

== Amateur radio callsign areas ==
In Japan, amateur radio (ham radio) licensing of operators is regulated by the Ministry of Internal Affairs and Communications (MIC, 総務省 Sōmu-shō) with the Japan Amateur Radio League (JARL, 日本アマチュア無線連盟) acting as a national amateur radio organization. The IARU cites a year 2000 count of licensed ham operators at 1,296,059, out of a total population of 126,925,843. The MIC publishes data showing 446,602 licensed stations as of October 2011.

Amateur radio call signs are assigned based on the area of residence, with the country divided into 10 areas as follows (listed from Northeast to Southwest):

Callsign areas of Japan

call areas	region	prefixes	number of stations
8	Hokkaido 北海道	JA8–JS8, 7J8, 8J8–8N8	40,476
7	Tohoku 東北	JA7–JS7, 7J7, 8J7–8N7	43,975
0	Shin'etsu 信越	JA0–JS0, 7J0, 8J0–8N0	18,771
1	Kanto 関東	JA1–JS1, 7J1, 8J1–8N1, 7K1–7N4	123,739
2	Tokai 東海	JA2–JS2, 7J2, 8J2–8N2	61,205
3	Kinki 近畿	JA3–JS3, 7J3, 8J3–8N3	54,023
9	Hokuriku 北陸	JA9–JS9, 7J9, 8J9–8N9	12,067
4	Chugoku 中国	JA4–JS4, 7J4, 8J4–8N4	30,464
5	Shikoku 四国	JA5–JS5, 7J5, 8J5–8N5	19,794
6	Kyushu and Okinawa 九州・沖縄	JA6–JS6, 7J6, 8J6–8N6	Kyushu: 39,512; Okinawa: 2,576

Outlying regions use a subset of the allocated prefixes:

region	prefix
Okinawa 沖縄	JR6, JS6
Ogasawara 小笠原	JD1

Most call signs are of the "2x3" format (2 letters, a digit, and 3 letters). There are some special-event and "old-timer" calls that are "2x2", and a small number of "2x1" calls for special events and other special purposes.

== Broadcasting ==
Radio and television stations in Japan all use callsigns starting with "JO", followed by two letters and an appropriate suffix. Suffixes include "-FM", "-TV" for analogue television, "-TAM" for EIAJ MTS secondary audio program services over analogue television, and "-DTV" for digital television. Broadcast auxiliary signals may use numbers in their callsigns.
