= Jiro Saito (businessman) =

Japanese official and businessman (born 1936)

Jiro Saito (斎藤 次郎, Saitō Jirō; born 1936) is a Japanese official and businessman who was president and chief executive officer (CEO) of Japan Post Holdings from 2009 to 2012. He was previously an official in the Ministry of Finance and was administrative vice minister from 1993 to 1995.

== Biography ==
Saito joined the Ministry of Finance in 1959. During the 1980s, he was credited for developing and enforcing a negative budget ceiling to reduce expenditures. After serving as chief of the Minister's Secretariat and chief of the Budget Bureau, Saito rose to administrative vice minister of finance in June 1993. Saito cultivated a strong network in the ministy and was reputed to exercise more influence than his predecessors.

During the Hosokawa cabinet, Saito worked with Ichirō Ozawa, the secretary of the Japan Renewal Party, on the introduction of a "national welfare tax", effectively a consumption tax hike. This plan was announced by Hosokawa, but drew opposition from coalition partners who hadn't been consulted, including Chief Cabinet Secretary Masayoshi Takemura. The plan was shelved due to the backlash.

In the Murayama cabinet, Takemura, who was on poor terms with Saito, became minister of finance. Saito bypassed Takemura by lobbying former Prime Minister Noboru Takeshita to realise a consumption tax hike from 3% to 5%. After scandals involving ministry officials, Saito resigned in May 1995.

He was not initially given a prestigious post-retirement position as was expected for a former vice minister. Instead, he was adviser to the ministry's Institute of Fiscal and Monetary Policy. In May 2000, he became president of the Tokyo Financial Exchange. It turned into a joint-stock company in April 2004. He acted as a mediator on the unsuccessful plan to form a grand coalition between the Liberal Democratic Party under Yasuo Fukuda and the Democratic Party of Japan under Ozawa in 2007.

During the Hatoyama cabinet, Saito was nominated to president of Japan Post Holdings by Postal Reform Minister Shizuka Kamei. The nomination received some criticism as the ruling Democratic Party of Japan had opposed similar appointments of retired bureaucrats under the Liberal Democratic Party government, such as blocking former finance bureaucrats nominated to governor of the Bank of Japan in 2007. Saito took office as president in October 2009. He stepped down in December 2012.
