= Japan Amateur Radio League =

National non-profit organization for amateur radio enthusiasts in Japan

- 日本アマチュア無線連盟
- Abbreviation: JARL
- Formation: 1926
- Type: Non-profit organization
- Purpose: Advocacy, Education
- Headquarters: Toshima-ku Tokyo; PM95ur
- Region served: Japan
- Official language: Japanese
- President: Koji Morita JA5SUD
- Affiliations: International Amateur Radio Union
- Website: http://www.jarl.or.jp/

The Japan Amateur Radio League (JARL) (日本アマチュア無線連盟) is a national non-profit organization for amateur radio enthusiasts in Japan. JARL was founded in 1926 by Robert Masayuki Hisamoto and Japanese radio communication enthusiasts whose stated aim was to promote the development and utilization of radio wave technology as a medium. JARL says its current membership comprises the largest number of radio stations in the world, and credits its growth to "the devoted efforts of pioneering hams, who took the history of amateur radio to heart and guided it through the changing and challenging winds of technology and radio regulations". JARL is the national member society representing Japan in the International Amateur Radio Union.

== Tokyo Ham Fair ==
Tokyo Ham Fair is an annual hamfest with world-wide attendees. The 2024 Japan Amateur Radio League convention received over 40,000 paying attendees in 2022.

== See also ==
- International Amateur Radio Union
- Ministry of Internal Affairs and Communications
- Amateur radio call signs of Japan
