= Japan Post Network =

Japan Post Network Co., Ltd.
- Company type: Private
- Founded: October 1, 2007
- Defunct: October 1, 2012
- Fate: Merged with Japan Post Service
- Headquarters: Tokyo, Japan
- Key people: Shigeo Kawa (CEO), Motoyuki Terasaka (COO)
- Number of employees: 120,700
- Parent: Japan Post Holdings
- Website: [www.jp-network.japanpost.jp

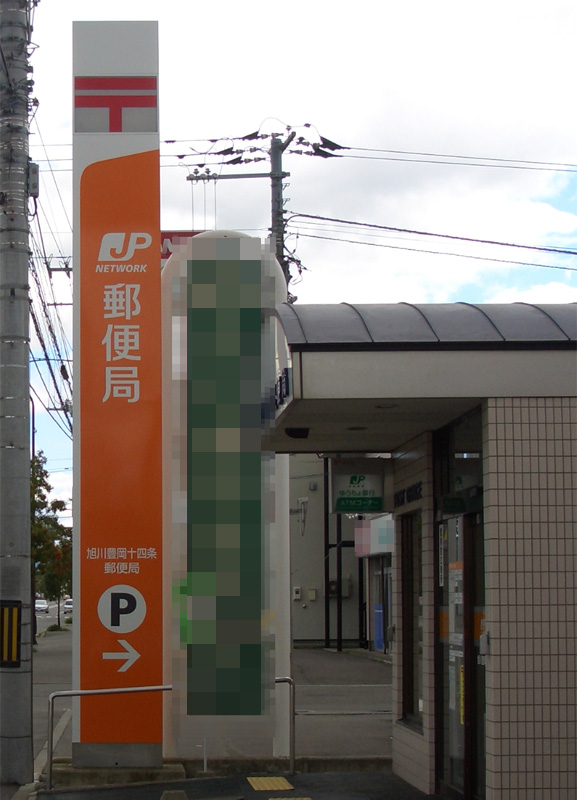
Japanese Post office

Japan Post Network Co., Ltd. (郵便局株式会社, Yū-bin Kyoku Kabushiki-gaisha), was a Japanese company which operated the post office of Japan. It was part of the Japan Post Holdings group.

== History ==
- October 1, 2007 – Operations commenced with the break-up and privatization of former Japan Post operating divisions.
- October 1, 2012 – Merged with Japan Post Service to form Japan Post Co., Ltd.

== See also ==
- Post office - In Japan, Post office is called 郵便局, which is the same name of Japan Post Network.
- Japan postal mark
- Japan Post Holdings - a holding company of Japan Post Group.
