= Japan Post Bank =

Current provider of postal banking in Japan

Japan Post Bank Co., Ltd.

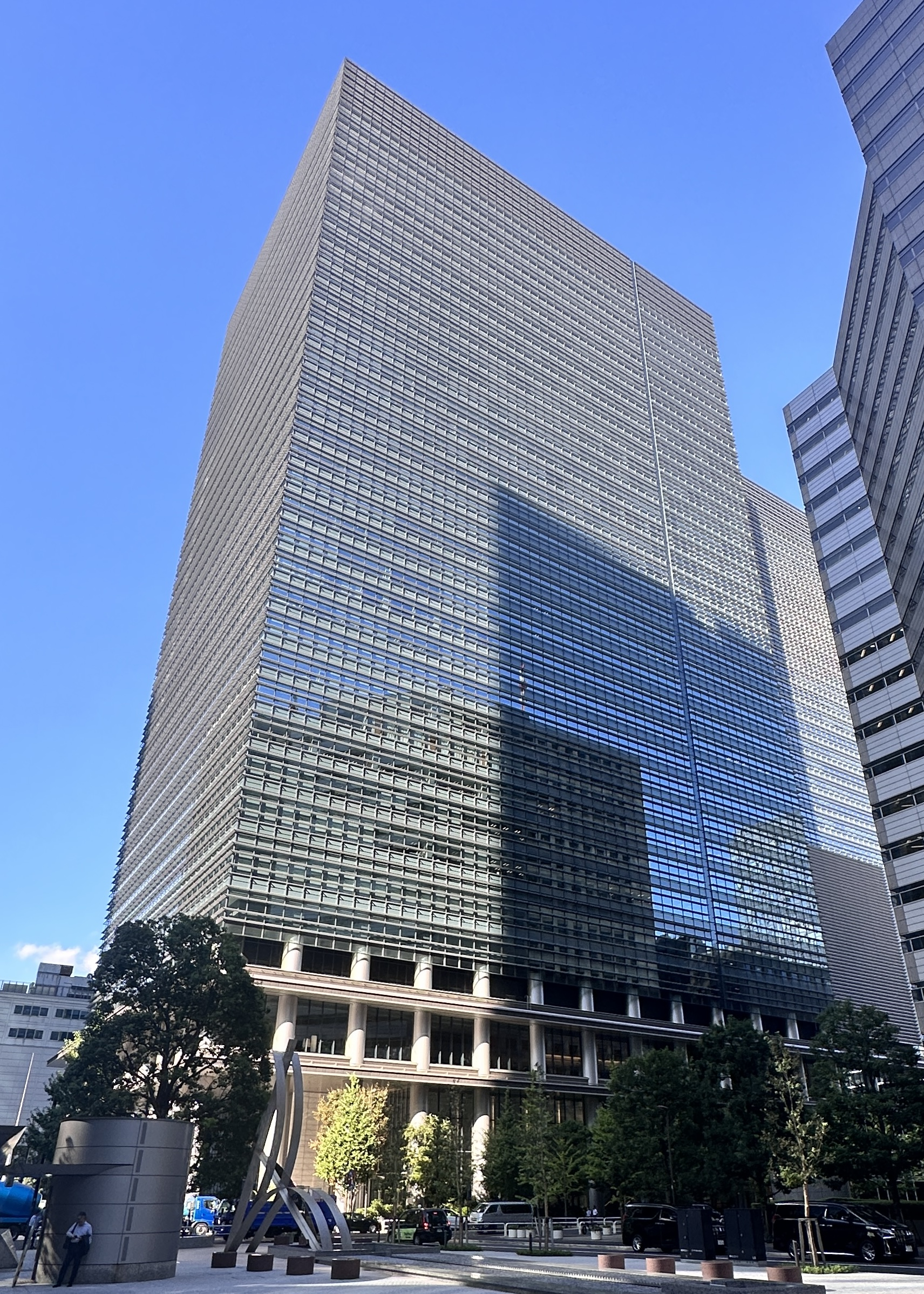
- Headquarters in Ōtemachi, Chiyoda, Tokyo
- Type: Public (subsidiary)
- Traded as: TYO: 7182
- Industry: Financial services
- Founded: September 1, 2006; 20 years ago
- Headquarters: Chiyoda, Tokyo, Japan
- Key people: Norito Ikeda (president and Representative Executive Officer), Susumu Tanaka (Representative Executive Vice President)
- Products: Asset management; Banking; Commodities; Credit cards; Equities trading; Insurance; Investment management; Mortgage loans; Mutual funds; Exchange-traded funds; Index funds; Private equity; Risk management; Wealth management
- Revenue: ¥1.85 trillion (2019)
- Net income: ¥266 billion (2019)
- AUM: ¥229.6 trillion (2022) (equivalent to ¥243.66 trillion or US$1.61 trillion in 2024)
- Total assets: ¥205 trillion (2019)
- Number of employees: 12,800 (2019)
- Parent: Japan Post Holdings (61.50%)
- Website: www.jp-bank.japanpost.jp

Japan Post Bank Co., Ltd. (株式会社ゆうちょ銀行, Kabushiki gaisha Yūcho Ginkō) is a Japanese bank headquartered in Tokyo. It is a corporation held by Japan Post Holdings, in which the government of Japan has a majority stake.

It is a major financial institution that started in 1875 as a postal savings system, and that still today continues to operate primarily out of post office branches. It manages over ¥205 trillion of assets and offers services in almost 24,000 branches across Japan. At times in its history, it was the largest financial institution in the world. Since its conception, it has played a significant role in both making economic services to people in Japan and making investments towards the economic and industrial development of the country.

Throughout the vast majority of its history, Japan Post Bank had always been fully government owned and organizationally a part of the postal system. In 2007, a bill was passed to begin the privatization of Japan Post Bank and to create separate companies to handle the distinct responsibilities of Japan Post. The government's sale of its shares in Japan Post Bank and its holding company are still ongoing.

== Organizational history ==
The postal savings system in Japan was started in 1875 by Maejima Hisoka, who is known as "the father of the Japanese postal system." In 1871, four years before he founded the postal system, Maejima had spent time observing the postal system of the United Kingdom and was impressed by its offering of postal savings services. Adoption by the public was rapid, with 10,000 customers within the first three years of operation.

After World War II, in 1949 the postal savings system was relaunched under the newly formed Ministry of Posts and Telecommunications. As the economy recovered, postal savings grew to tremendous sums, reaching ¥1 trillion in 1960 and ¥100 trillion in 1985. In 2001, the postal savings system came under the jurisdiction of the Postal Services Agency, which soon reorganized into Japan Post in 2003.

Through all these organizational changes, the postal savings services were managed by a single government-owned company that also handled significant postal and insurance divisions. In 2006, Japan Post Holdings was founded as a government-owned holding company in preparation for the division of these responsibilities into separate companies with partial private ownership, a reorganization which occurred on 1 October 2007. On 3 November 2015, the shares of Japan Post Bank Company debuted for the first time on the Tokyo Stock Exchange, with about 10% of shares listed.

== Historical role in economic development ==
The importance of the Japanese postal banking system lies not just in providing a savings vehicle and financial services to the people of Japan, but also in the use of the saved funds to promote economic development throughout modern Japan's history.

=== Founding through World War II ===
Postal savings were first deposited at Dai-Ichi National Bank, a private bank of issue, but starting in 1878 deposits were made to Ministry of Finance, which became the exclusive destination for deposits in 1884.

This was during the Meiji era, when the Japanese government was focused on encouraging economic and military modernization and avoid foreign debt to remain independent during a period of Western colonialism. A particular concern was foreign debt, as observers in Japan saw indebtedness in countries like China and Egypt leading to their subordination to their creditors.

However, this transformation required large amounts of capital to finance as railways, communications systems and industrial development in a country with a low savings rate because a large majority did not see money as something to be saved and invested. Postal banking became a success, and by 1885 it had 1.25 million depositors who could make financial transactions at around 4500 post office branches.

At the beginning, deposits were lent exclusively to the government through the purchase of government bonds. In the 1890s, the government starting creating several banks that could offer industrial loans backed by these deposits. However, this type of lending only became notable after 1912, and only by the 1930s did it become the type of system which would become important after the war that lent funds to specific institutions to achieve developmental objectives.

In the lead-up to and during World War II, postal savings were invested in companies involved in wartime production and government bonds, which were issued in significant amounts to finance the war effort. This period saw postal savings grow at its highest rate ever, quintupling between 1942 and 1945.

=== Post-war ===
The banking system was in complete disarray immediately after the war. The savings rate became negative as depositors withdrew money that had lost significant value during wartime inflation. Records for 52 million accounts were destroyed in war damage. Finally, ¥6 billion of investments by the postal savings system in overseas colonial territories vanished as the government struggled to control the domestic economy.

To promote savings which could be invested into rebuilding the economy, Japanese officials issued relentless statements advocating for austerity and instituted measures to restore confidence in the financial system. From the 1950s, postal savings experienced steady growth and increased its market share relative to private banks, thanks to the huge availability of postal offices, attractive financial products offering good returns and preferential tax treatment on deposits from the government.

During the Allied Occupation of Japan, deposits into the postal savings system were allowed to be invested only in government and municipal bonds and private financial institutions were mainly responsible for issuing capital. After a revision in public financing in 1951, due to the need for funds for both rebuilding and the Korean War, funds could once again be deposited at the Ministry of Finance and invested in industry through the Fiscal Investment and Loan Program (FILP). Financial corporations were established by the government to make loans to government and industrial bodies which contributed to rapid industrial development and economic growth. From the 1953, the funds distributed through FILP totaled one-half to one-third of the national budget. In 2001, amid a controversy over the privatization of Japan Post Bank and the political influence over the use of FILP funds, a reform was passed which ended the official linkage between FILP and Japan Post Bank deposits, although funds continued to flow in practice.

== Privatization ==
In 2005, a bill to privatize the Japanese postal office was passed, which included the privatization of Japan's postal banking services as a separate company in the same ownership structure as other post office holdings. This process began in 2007. The bill intended to make Japan Post Bank an independent entity, with the government selling off its shares by 2017, and that it would continue to operate out of post office branches of the Japan Post Service, the equivalent company formed for postal services.

The plan for privatization did not proceed smoothly. In 2009, in response to the 2008 financial crisis, privatization was halted and savings were encouraged to fund stimulus spending. In 2011, after the Great East Japan Earthquake, shares of the postal bank were once again permitted to be sold to help finance rebuilding after the disaster. In 2015, Japan Post Bank had its shares offered for sale in the Tokyo Stock Exchange for the first time, with about 10% of its shares offered.

Progress towards privatization has been gradual. At the end of 2019, the government had a 57% ownership stake in Japan Post Holdings, which owns 90% of Japan Post Bank. The respective shares had decreased to 36% and 61.50% by end-March 2024, implying that the government held an economic interest of 22 percent in Japan Post Bank. (Note: For updated Japan Post Holdings ownership information, see here. For Japan Post Bank ownership information, see here.)

== Current operations ==
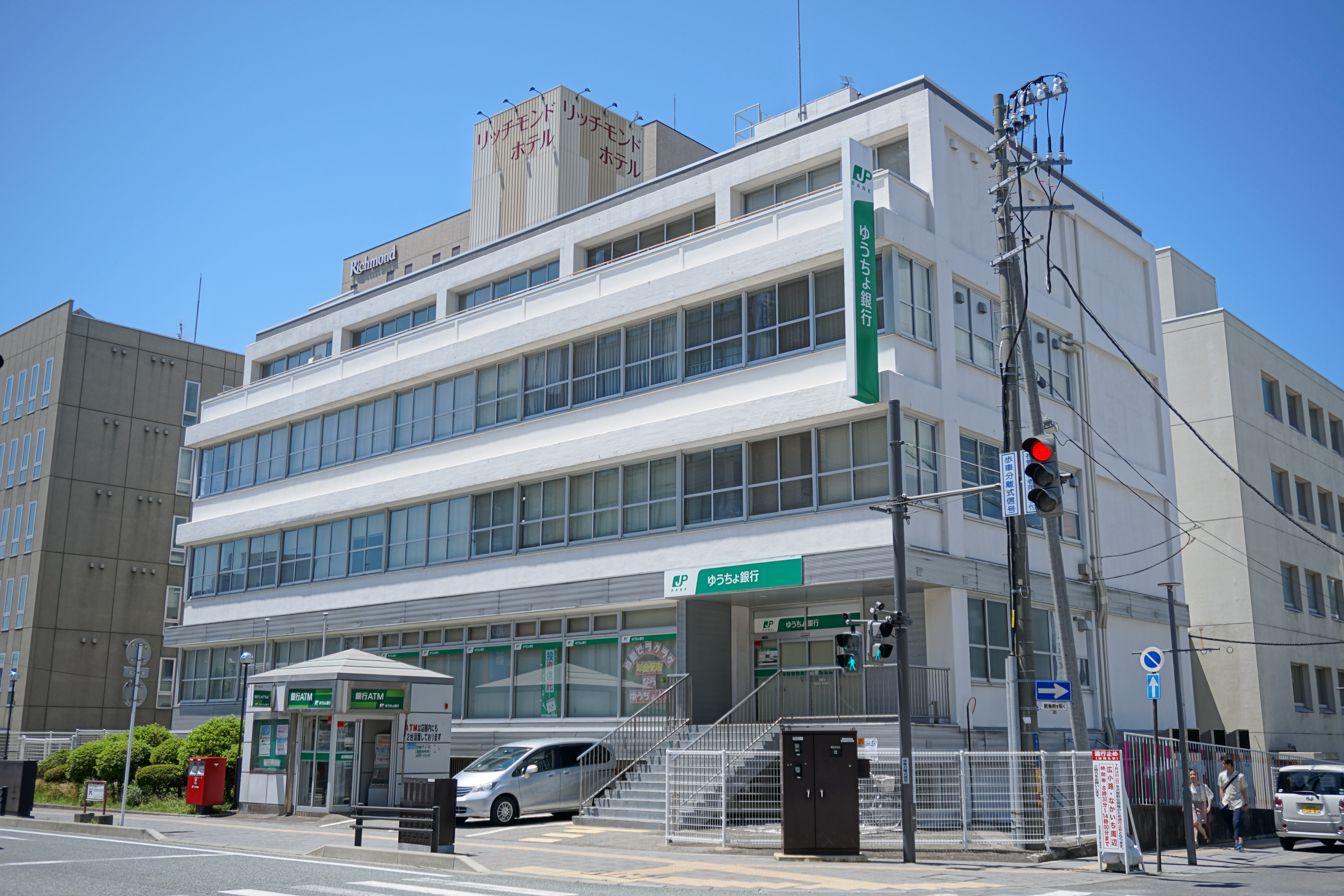
The outside of a Japan Post Bank branch in Akita, Japan.

In 2019, Japan Post Bank was managing ¥205 trillion of assets. It oversaw approximately 120 million customer accounts, who had access to services in almost 24,000 branches across Japan, most of which are contracted post offices officially belonging to the Japan Post Service. The bank offers a variety of financial products, including deposit accounts, credit cards and loans, investment products, time deposits, and pension accounts.

The bank also provides an important social benefit through making financial services available to rural areas. In parts of Japan where the population is shrinking or has a high proportion of elderly people, Japan Post Bank operating out of a post office may be the only financial institution available.

The bank also manages almost 30,000 ATMs across Japan. Since many transactions in Japan are still conducted with cash, Japan Post Bank also plays an important role in making ATMs available where other bank branches are encouraging cashless payment or reducing their ATM numbers.

In May 2019, Japan Post Bank launched Yucho, a smartphone-based payment service that pays a participating store directly from the user's bank account. The service initially launched with approximately 10,000 customers, and also allows for payment or withdrawals through scanning QR codes.

In March 2021, Japan Post announced it would invest ¥150bn ($1.4bn) to acquire a 8.3 percent stake in Rakuten in order to create a partnership dealing in logistics, mobile and payments businesses.

In 2025, Japan Post bank announced a plan to issue a digital currency to revitalise its 190 trillion yen (US$1.29 trillion) deposit, which made it one of the largest fund holders in the country.

=== Controversies ===
In 2019, an internal investigation revealed thousands of instances where investment products were sold improperly, with 90% of 230 directly managed Japan Post Bank outlets involved. It found that products were sold to elderly customers without confirming their full understanding of the product. This resulted in an investigation by the Financial Services Agency and a temporary suspension of its sales and marketing for insurance and financial products.

== See also ==
- Yucho
