= Japan Post Holdings =

Japanese conglomerate

Japan Post Holdings Co., Ltd.

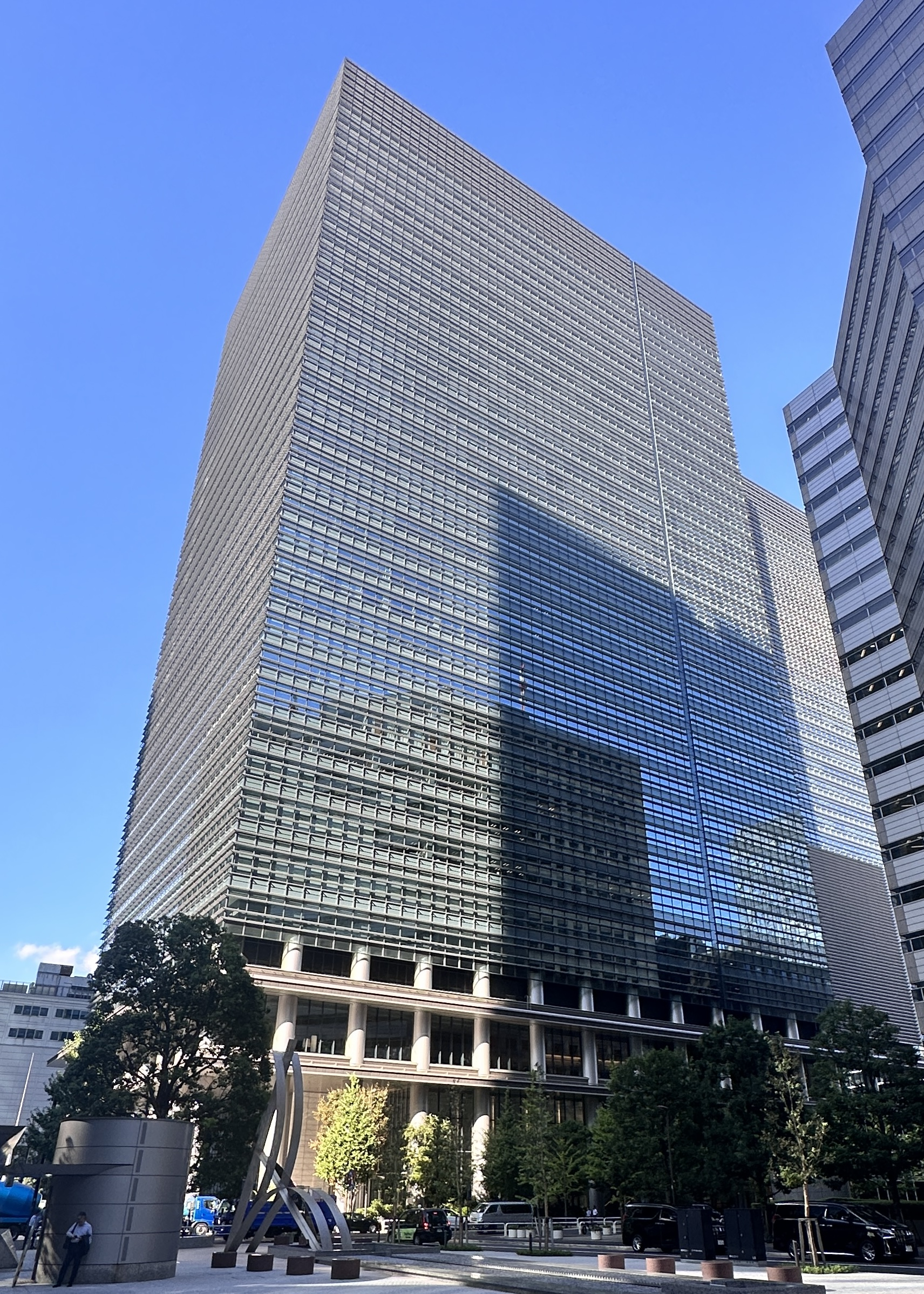
- Headquarters in Ōtemachi, Chiyoda, Tokyo
- Native name: 日本郵政株式会社
- Romanized name: Nippon Yūsei kabushiki gaisha
- Type: Public
- Traded as: TYO: 6178; Nikkei 225 component; TOPIX Large70 component
- Industry: Conglomerate
- Predecessor: Japan Post
- Founded: 23 January 2006; 20 years ago (incorporation); 1 October 2007; 19 years ago (start of operations)
- Headquarters: Otemachi PLACE, Ōtemachi, Chiyoda, Tokyo, Japan
- Key people: Kazuyuki Negishi (president and CEO)
- Products: Mail delivery, post offices, banking, life insurance, insurance, courier
- Services: Financial services
- Revenue: ▲¥11,468.3 billion (2025)
- Operating income: ▲¥814.5 billion (2025)
- Net income: ▲¥370.5 billion (2025)
- Total assets: ▼¥29.7149653 trillion (2025)
- Total equity: ▼¥1.528954 trillion (2025)
- Owners: Minister of Finance (38.8%)
- Number of employees: 360,000 (2025)
- Subsidiaries: Japan Post; Japan Post Bank; Japan Post Insurance; Toll Group
- Website: www.japanpost.jp/en/

Japan Post Holdings Co., Ltd. (Japanese: 日本郵政株式会社, Hepburn: Nippon Yūsei kabushiki gaisha)} is a Japanese publicly traded conglomerate headquartered in Kasumigaseki, Chiyoda, Tokyo. It is mainly engaged in postal and logistics business, financial window business, banking business and life insurance business. The company offers letters and goods transportation services, stamp sales, deposits, loans, and insurance products.

On November 4, 2015, Japan Post Holding (TYO: 6178) was listed on the Tokyo Stock Exchange as part of a "triple IPO" (initial public offering) with shares offered as well in Japan Post Bank (TYO: 7182) and Japan Post Insurance (TYO: 7181). About 10% of the shares in each company were offered. In October 2021, the Japanese government abandoned its majority ownership of the company, while also still maintaining the most stock.

Japan Post Holdings is also a constituent of the Nikkei 225 and TOPIX Large70 indices.

== History ==
The company was founded on 23 January 2006, although it was not until October 2007 that it took over the functions of Japan Post.

There were plans to fully privatize the company, but were subsequently put on hold. As of 2013, it ranked thirteenth in the Fortune Global 500 list of the world's largest companies.

On April 25, 2017, Japan Post Holdings said it would have a ¥40bn ($360m) loss for its first full financial year as a listed company, due to losses from Toll Group, which it controversially acquired in 2015.

In September 2017, the Japanese government announced its sale of $12 billion worth of Japan Post Holdings Co. Ltd. stock. It was the first sale since the 2015 IPO of the postal company and its two units, Japan Post Bank Co. Ltd. and Japan Post Insurance Co. Ltd.. That sale also raised $12 billion, which was used for the repair and reconstruction of places that were destroyed by an earthquake and tsunami in 2011.

In December 2019, the heads of Japan Post Holdings announced that they will resign over the improper sales of insurance policies, after the regulator announced administrative punishments against the companies. The company said that Hiroya Masuda, a former minister of Internal Affairs and Communications, has been appointed as successor to current CEO Masatsugu Nagato.

In March 2021, Japan Post Holdings announced that it would invest 150 billion yen or US$1.38 billion and take a 8 percent stake in internet conglomerate Rakuten.

== Senior leadership ==
Japan Post Holdings has been led by a President and CEO - both roles being held by the same executive - since the company's founding in 2006.

=== List of presidents and CEOs ===
1. Yoshifumi Nishikawa (2006–2009)
2. Jiro Saito (2009–2012)
3. Atsuo Saka (2012–2013)
4. Taizo Nishimuro (2013–2016)
5. Masatsugu Nagato (2016–2020)
6. Hiroya Masuda (2020–2025)
7. Kazuyuki Negishi (since June 2025)

== Operating companies ==
The group operates via four main divisions:

- Japan Post, which deals with mail delivery and runs the post offices. Prior to 2012 this division was divided in Japan Post Service and Japan Post Network.
- Japan Post Bank, which deals with banking functions.
- Japan Post Insurance, which provides life insurance.
- Toll Group, which provides transportation and logistics

== Privatization ==
=== Early discussions ===
Privatization of the postal system in Japan was first considered in the 1980s under Prime Minister Nakasone, who, amid concerns about the government deficit, oversaw the privatization of three major public corporations: the Japanese National Railways, Nippon Telegraph and Telephone (NTT), and Japan Tobacco. These discussions did not proceed, and in 1997 the issue of privatizing Japan Post Bank specifically was raised again under Prime Minister Hashimoto. This time, opposition from within the ruling and opposition parties resulted only in reforms aimed at improving financial discipline that fell short of actual privatization.

=== Enactment of privatization ===
In 2001, during an economic downturn in Japan, LDP politician Junichiro Koizumi took office with significant public support to privatize the postal system. Benefits of privatization that were touted by supporters included efficiency of the financial sector, reducing political influence in the use of postal savings, and reducing bureaucratic mismanagement of funds. Detractors, including the postal lobby were concerned that privatization would shrink the universal availability of postal services in Japan, losing to job losses and the closing of rural post offices.

Prime Minister Koizumi quickly established a commission to examine privatization of the postal system's businesses and in 2002 a package of four bills was passed which established Japan Post as a public corporation. In the following year, he was reelected with a promise to privatize the postal system. In 2004, Koizumi's government announced an ambitious ten-year plan for splitting Japan Post into several privatized entities by 2017. In 2005, the resulting package of six privatization bills was defeated in the upper house of the Japanese Diet, and Koizumi called a snap election focused on postal privatization. He won the election in a landslide, receiving a public mandate for his privatization plans and defeating members of his own party who were opposed. The privatization package passed a few weeks later.

=== 2005 plan for privatization ===
The Postal Privatization Law passed in 2005 laid out a framework for a preparation phase, a ten-year transition phase that was revised to start on October 1, 2007, and a post-privatization phase to organize the companies into their final forms. A Cabinet-level Postal Privatization Headquarters would be established to develop and implementation plan to manage privatization and divide the resources of Japan Post between the successor companies.

Japan Post Holdings was to start as a state-owned holding company for Japan Post Bank, Japan Post Insurance, Japan Post Network, and Japan Post Service and gradually sell off its shares through 2017. The original plan was for the government to retain about a one-third ownership share of Japan Post Holdings, and for Japan Post Holdings to sell all its shares in its banking and insurance subsidiaries. Proceeds from the sale were to be used to reduce government debt.

=== Implementation of privatization and current status ===
The plan for privatization did not proceed smoothly, and after having been subject to a variety of external factors that still continues to this day. In 2009, the Democratic Party of Japan took power and halted the initial public offering for Japan Post companies. In 2012, the administration went further in blunting some aspects of privatization, allowing the government to maintain indefinite control over Japan Post Holdings by stipulating a minimum of one-third shares to be owned by the government and removing targets for shares sold in the banking and insurance services units.

In late 2012, incoming Prime Minister Shinzo Abe reemphasized progress towards privatization as part of his Abenomics plan for economic reform and growth. It was also hoped that the sale of shares could raise funds for rebuilding after the Great East Japan Earthquake. One result was the expediting of the IPO process for Japan Post companies. In 2015, a triple IPO was conducted where Japan Post Holdings, Japan Post Bank and Japan Post Insurance each had about 10% of their shares offered for sale in the Tokyo Stock Exchange for the first time.

Privatization is ongoing slowly, having already fallen short of the original plan. At the end of 2019, the government had a 57% ownership stake in Japan Post Holdings, which still owns 90% of Japan Post Bank and Japan Post Insurance. In April 2021, Japan Post Holdings agreed to sell part of its unprofitable Australian logistics company Toll Holdings for only 7.8 million Australian dollars. The offer was accepted despite the fact that Toll Holdings had lost 67.4 billion yen, or roughly $624 million, for the fiscal year which ended in March 2021. On October 6, 2021, the final stage of a difficult privatisation process which had begun in 2005 was completed after with the sale of a $9 billion tranche of shares. This accounted for up to $1.03 billion of its shares in the business. However, the Japanese government still holds the largest share of stock in the company.

== See also ==
- Postage stamps and postal history of Japan
- National postal services
