= Japan Post =

Japanese statutory corporation

- Native name: 日本郵政公社
- Romanized name: Nippon Yūsei Kōsha
- Type: Statutory corporation
- Industry: Courier
- Predecessor: Postal Services Agency of the Ministry of Public Management, Home Affairs, Posts and Telecommunications
- Founded: 1 April 2003; 23 years ago, by reorganization of the Postal Services Agency
- Defunct: 1 October 2007
- Fate: Privatized
- Successor: Japan Post Holdings
- Headquarters: Kasumigaseki, Chiyoda, Tokyo, Japan
- Key people: Maejima Hisoka
- Revenue: ▲¥23,061 billion JPY (2006)
- Net income: ▲¥1,993 billion JPY (2006)
- Number of employees: 256,572 (full-time, 2006)
- Divisions: Postal Service, Postal Savings, Postal Life Insurance

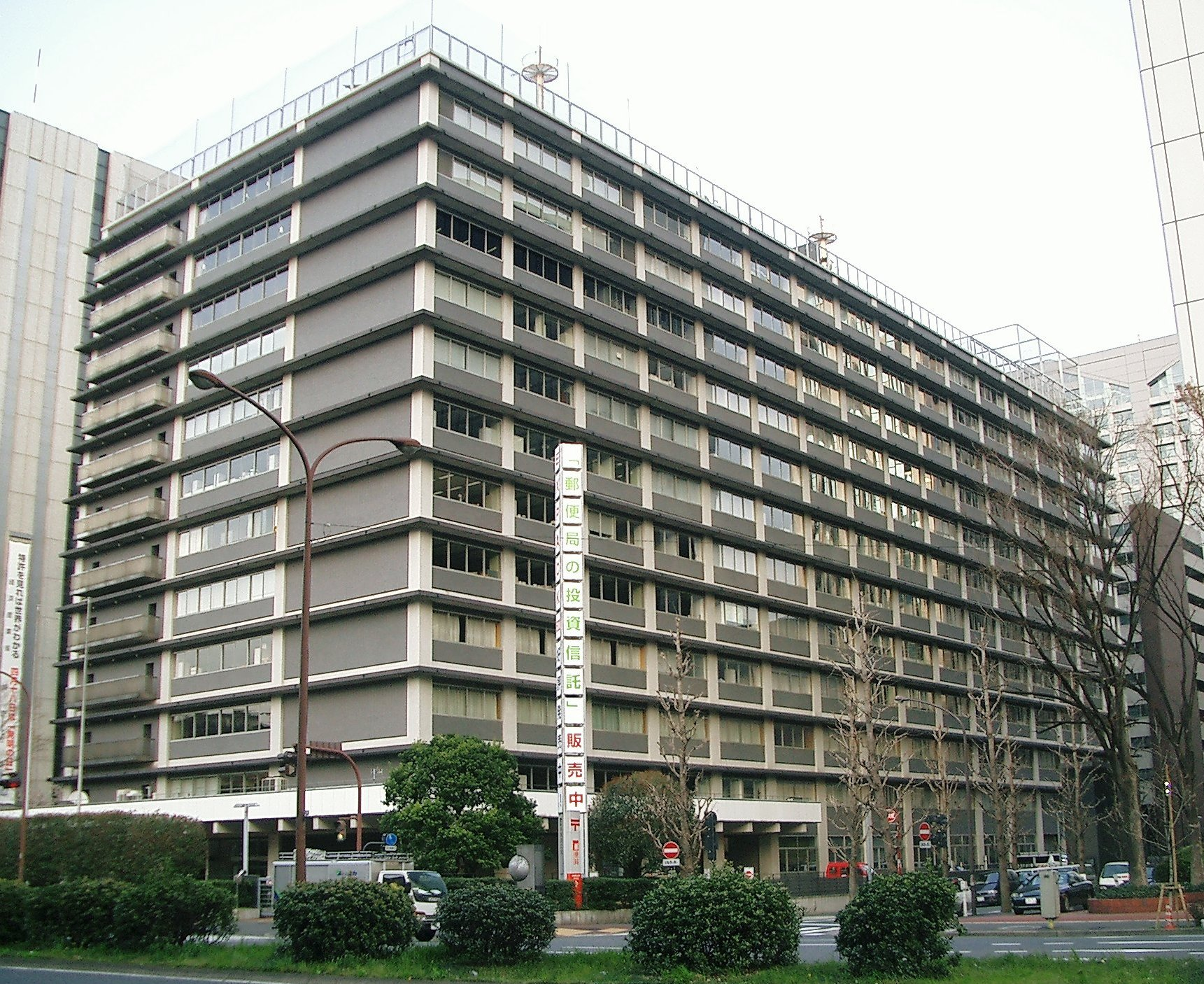
Japan Post Office head office building

Japan Post (日本郵政公社, Nippon Yūsei Kōsha) was a Japanese statutory corporation that existed from 2003 to 2007, offering postal and package delivery services, banking services, and life insurance. It was the nation's largest employer, having had over 400,000 employees, and ran 24,700 post offices throughout Japan. One third of all Japanese government employees worked for Japan Post. As of 2005, the President of the company was Masaharu Ikuta, formerly Chairman of Mitsui O.S.K. Lines Ltd.

Japan Post ran the world's largest postal savings system and is often said to be the largest holder of personal savings in the world: with ¥224 trillion ($2.1 trillion) of household assets in its yū-cho savings accounts, and ¥126 trillion ($1.2 trillion) of household assets in its kampo life insurance services; its holdings account for 25 percent of household assets in Japan. Japan Post also holds about ¥140 trillion (one fifth) of the Japanese national debt in the form of government bonds.

On October 1, 2007, Japan Post was privatized following a fierce political debate that was settled by the general election of 2005. The major concern was Japan Post, with government backing, stymieing competition and giving politicians access to postal savings to fund pet projects. Japan Post was split into three companies in 2007, intending to be privatized by 2017. Following privatization, Japan Post Holdings operate the postal business.

In 2010, the privatization was put on hold, with the Japanese Ministry of Finance remaining the 100% shareholder. However, on October 26, 2012, the Japanese government unveiled plans to list shares of Japan Post Holdings within three years, partly to raise money for the reconstruction of areas devastated by the earthquake and tsunami of 2011. As of 2020, the government still holds 57% of shares, and March 2028 was announced as the target date of privatization. In October 2021, the Japanese government completed its majority privatisation process of Japan Post Holdings, but also still maintained control of most of the company's stock.

== Postal privatization ==
The company was born on April 2, 2003, as a government-owned corporation, replacing the old Postal Services Agency of the Ministry of Public Management, Home Affairs, Posts and Telecommunications (総務省郵政事業庁, Sōmu-shō Yūsei Jigyōchō). Japan Post's formation was part of then Prime Minister Junichiro Koizumi's long-term reform plan and was intended to culminate in the full privatization of the postal service. The privatization plan encountered both support and opposition across the Japanese political spectrum, including the two largest parties, the LDP and the DPJ. Opponents claimed that the move would result in the closure of post offices and job losses at the nation's largest employer. However, proponents contended that privatization would allow for a more efficient and flexible use of the company's funds, which would help revitalize Japan's economy. Proponents also claimed that Japan Post had become an enormous source of corruption and patronage. Koizumi called the privatization a major element in his efforts to curb government spending and the growth of the national debt. Most opposition parties supported postal privatization in principle, but criticized Koizumi's bill. Many considered the bill deeply flawed because it provided for too long a period for full implementation and included too many loopholes that might create a privatization in name only.

In September 2003, Koizumi's cabinet proposed splitting Japan Post into four separate companies: a bank, an insurance company, a postal service company, and a fourth company to handle the post offices as retail outlets for the other three entities. Each of these companies would be privatized in April 2007. In 2005, the Lower House of the Japanese legislature passed the bill to complete this reform by a handful of votes, with many members of Koizumi's LDP voting against their own government. The bill was subsequently defeated in the Upper House because of scores of defections from the ruling coalition. Koizumi immediately dissolved the lower house and scheduled a general election to be held on September 11, 2005. He declared the election to be a referendum on postal privatization. Koizumi won this election, gaining the necessary supermajority in the lower house, which he took as a mandate for reform.

The final version of the bill to privatize Japan Post in 2007 was passed in October 2005. It officially abolished Japan Post, with its branches broken up into a shareholding company and four other companies for postal service, postal savings, postal life insurance, and post office service networks. The legislation provided a 10-year transition period wherein the savings and insurance companies would be fully privatized while the government would still continue to be involved with the three other companies. The law also stated that Japan Post Bank and Japan Post Insurance are to go public in 2010 and their shares would be made available to the market two years later. However, the majority privatisation process, which nonetheless saw the Japanese government still maintain control of one-third of the company's stock, was completed in October 2021. The Japanese government also still remains the company's largest stockholder.

== Concerns and opportunities ==
There were fears that the postal service branch of the Japan Post would be disadvantaged after its break from the banking and insurance branches. It is believed that it was losing money and is merely subsidized by the two financial divisions, which are more profitable. To cover a lack of financial resources, many observers advocated for diversification in order to attain profitability. This includes a potential entry into the logistics business, which Japan Post itself has signified it would pursue post-privatization. Studies also revealed that the new companies are poised to gain from emerging opportunities in the market. Aside from international logistics, there are also securitization, consumer lending, and health care, among others.

== See also ==
- Postage stamps and postal history of Japan
- Japanese addressing system
- Missing Post Office
- Package delivery
