= Japan Post Service =

Japanese postal company

Japan Post Co., Ltd.

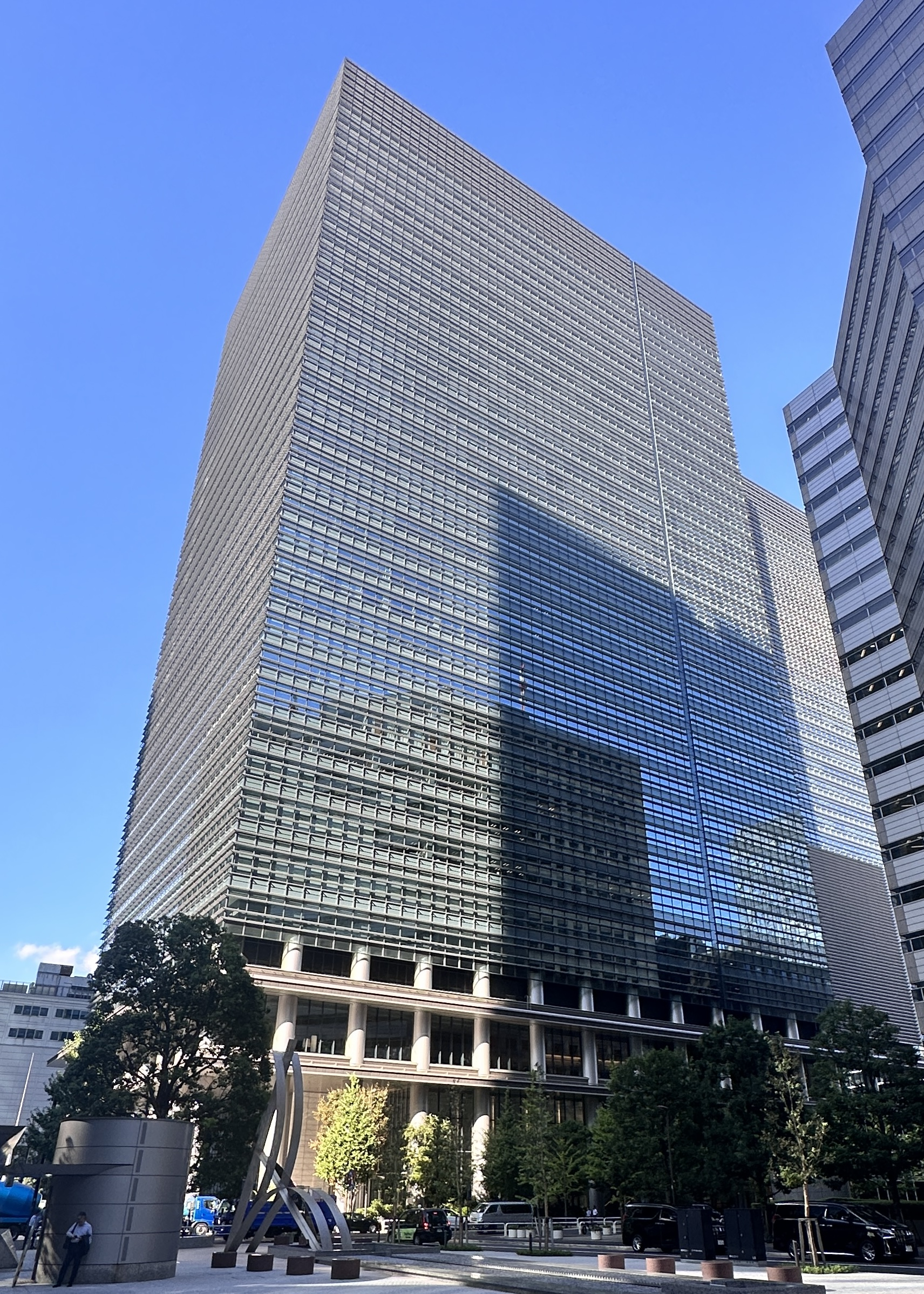
- Headquarters in Ōtemachi, Chiyoda, Tokyo
- Type: Subsidiary
- Industry: Postal Service, Air Courier
- Founded: October 1, 2007; 18 years ago
- Headquarters: Tokyo, Japan
- Key people: Norio Kitamura (CEO); Hiroaki Dan (COO)
- Number of employees: 100,100
- Parent: Japan Post Holdings
- Website: www.post.japanpost.jp/index.html

Japan Post Co., Ltd. (日本郵便株式会社, Nippon Yūbin Kabushiki-gaisha), is a Japanese post, logistics and courier headquartered in Tokyo. It is part of the Japan Post Holdings group.

== History ==
Japan Post (Nippon Yūbin) was formed on October 1, 2007, after the privatization of its predecessor, Nippon Yūsei, which was also rendered in English as Japan Post. On October 1, 2012, Japan Post Network was merged with the company to form the current Japan Post Co., Ltd..

== See also ==
- Japanese addressing system
- Package delivery
- Japanese postal mark
- Japan Post Holdings – a holding company of Japan Post Group
- Japan Post
