= Maejima Hisoka =

Japanese politician

Senior Second Rank Baron Maejima Hisoka
- 前島 密
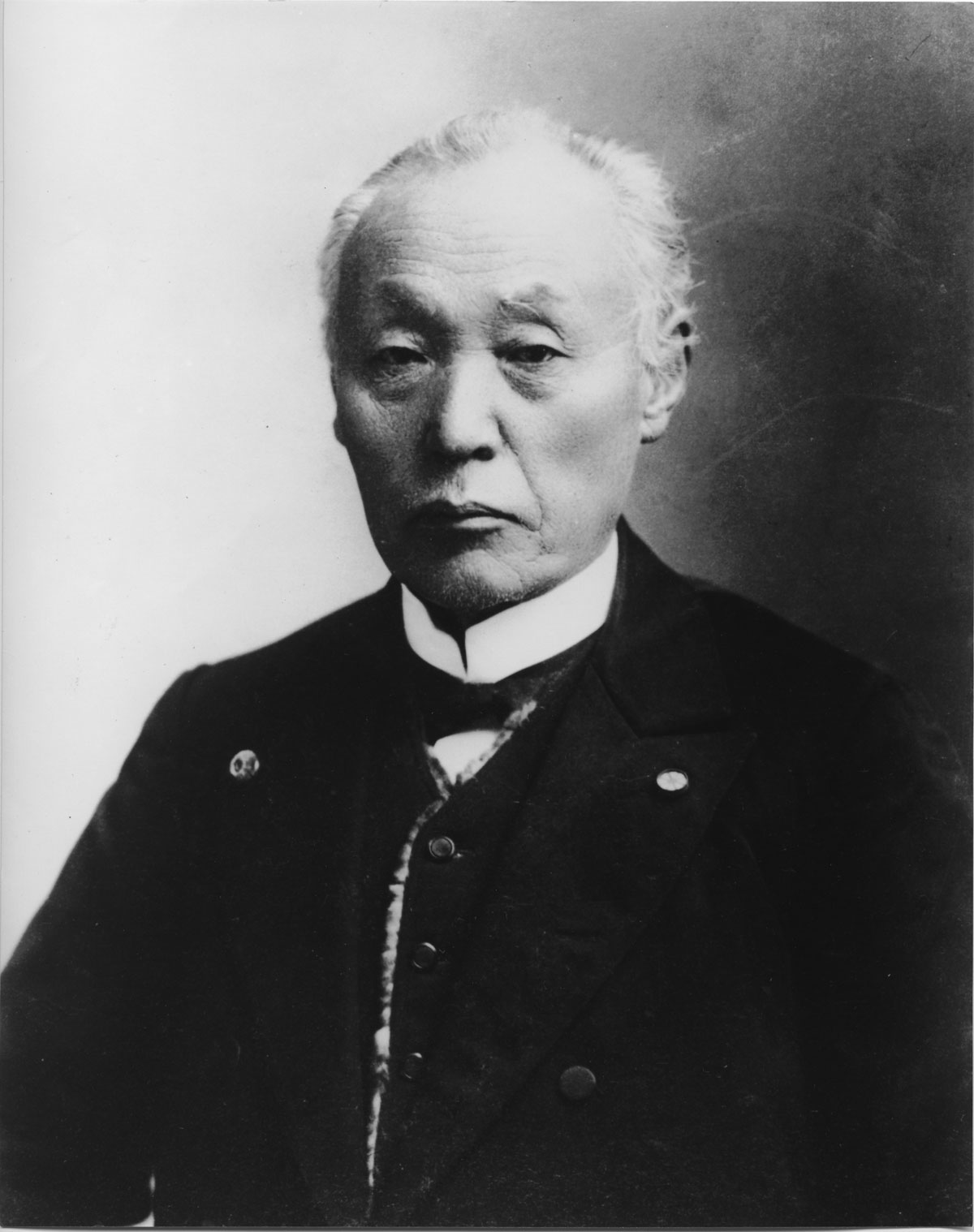
- Baron Maejima Hisoka

Member of the House of Peers
- In office 10 July 1904 – 10 March 1910 Elected by the Barons

Member of the Genrōin
- In office 5 March 1878 – 28 February 1880

Personal details
- Born: Ueno Fusagorō; 24 January 1835 Shimoikebe, Echigo, Japan
- Died: 27 April 1919 (aged 84) Ashina, Kanagawa, Japan
- Party: Rikken Kaishintō
- Occupation: Government official, Entrepreneur
- Known for: Founding the first Japanese postal system

Japanese name
- Kanji: 前島 密
- Hiragana: まえじま ひそか
Transcriptions
- Romanization: Maejima Hisoka

Baron Maejima Hisoka (前島 密; 24 January 1835 – 27 April 1919), born Ueno Fusagorō (上野 房五郎), was a Japanese statesman, politician, and businessman in Meiji-period Japan. Maejima founded the Japanese postal service, and is known as Yūbin Seido no Chichi (郵便制度の父), or "Father of the Postal System".

== Early life ==
Maejima was born as Ueno Fusagorō, in the village of Shimoikebe, Echigo Province (present-day the city of Jōetsu, Niigata Prefecture). In 1866 he was adopted into the Maejima family. He was sent to Edo to study rangaku, medical science and English. In the Bakumatsu period he was considered a radical reformer and proponent of westernization. In 1866, he submitted an unsolicited proposal to shōgun Tokugawa Yoshinobu that Japan abolish the use of kanji (Chinese characters) in its writing system. In 1868, shortly after the Meiji Restoration, he also proposed to Ōkubo Toshimichi that the capital of Japan be moved from Kyoto to Edo.

== Meiji bureaucrat ==
Ōkubo liked the gall of the upstart Maejima, and appointed him to the new Minbu-shō (Ministry for Popular Affairs) in the new Meiji government, where his outspoken attitude caught the attention of Itō Hirobumi and Ōkuma Shigenobu. He was sent to Great Britain in 1870 to study the workings of the General Post Office, and upon his return to Japan in 1871, his proposals for the creation of a similar system in Japan were quickly approved.

The Japanese post office began operation in April 1871 with a daily service linking Tokyo with Osaka, with 65 post offices in between. Maejima personally coined the Japanese word for postage stamp (kitte). To make the system self-supporting, and to extend the modern economic system into the Japanese countryside, Maejima also created a system of postal savings banks in 1874. This system expanded to include money orders in 1875.

In 1874, Maejima hired a foreign advisor, Samuel M. Bryan, to negotiate a postal treaty with the United States, and to assist in the admission of Japan into the Universal Postal Union in 1877.

In 1878, Maejima was appointed to the Genrōin, and in 1879, he was appointed Vice Minister for Home Affairs. By the time Maejima retired in 1881, the Japanese postal system had expanded to 5,099 post offices and was continuing to grow.

== Occupations ==
While establishing the postal system, Maejima somehow also found time to start his own newspaper in 1872. The Yubin Hochi Shimbun was renamed the Hochi Shimbun in 1894, and was merged with the Yomiuri Shimbun in 1942.

Not content with two careers, Maejima also found time to assist Ōkuma Shigenobu in establishing the Tokyo Semmon Gakkō in 1882, of which he served as principal from 1886 to 1890. The school was renamed Waseda University in 1902.

Seeing the potential for profit in the rapidly expanding railroad network in Japan, in 1886 Maejima established the Kansai Railroad Company in Osaka. He followed in this career by establishing a second railroad company, the Hokuetsu Railway connecting Niigata with Naoetsu in 1894.

Meanwhile. Maejima and Okuma helped establish the Rikken Kaishintō political party. He was appointed as Vice Minister of Communications from 1888 to 1891, during which time he established Japan's state-owned telephone service.

Ennobled with the title of danshaku (baron) under the kazoku peerage system in 1902, he served as a member of the House of Peers from 1904 to 1910. He died in 1919 at his summer cottage in Yokosuka, Kanagawa Prefecture.

As one would expect, he has been honored on several Japanese postage stamps.

== In popular culture ==
Tetsushi Tanaka portrayed Maejima Hisoka in 2025 Netflix TV series Last Samurai Standing, streamed in November 2025.
