= Nankai 8300 series =

Japanese train type

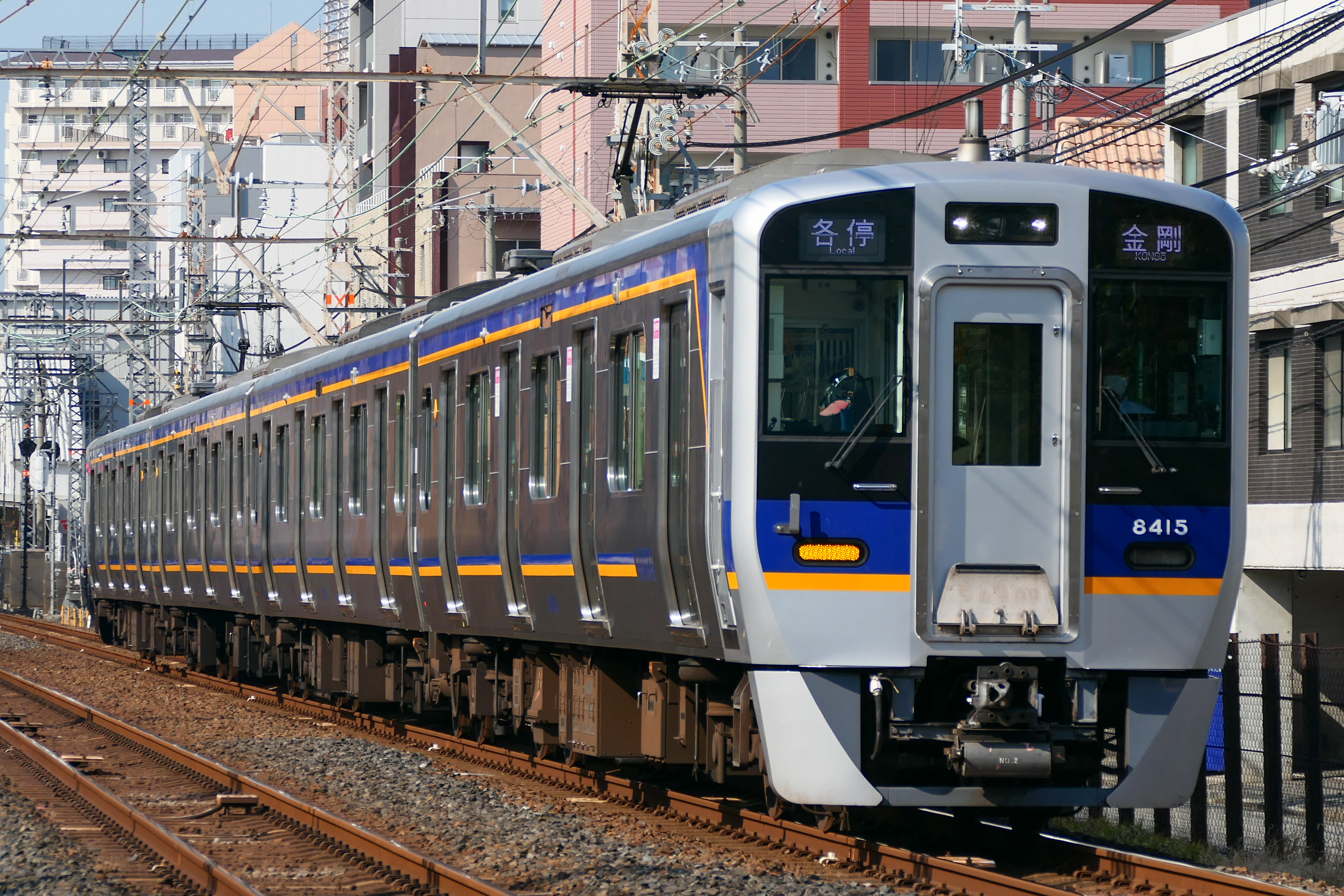
- Four-car set 8315 in October 2023
- In service: 8 October 2015 – present
- Manufacturer: Kinki Sharyo
- Replaced: 7100 series, 6000 series
- Constructed: 2015–
- Number built: 110 vehicles (36 sets)
- Number in service: 110 vehicles (36 sets)
- Formation: 2/4 cars per trainset
- Fleet numbers: 8301–8319, 8701–8717
- Operator: Nankai Electric Railway
- Lines served: Nankai Main Line; Nankai Wakayamakō Line; Nankai Airport Line; Nankai Koya Line; Semboku Rapid Railway Line

Specifications
- Car body construction: Stainless steel
- Car length: 20,765 mm (68 ft 2 in) (end cars); 20,665 mm (67 ft 10 in) (intermediate cars)
- Width: 2,830 mm (9 ft 3 in)
- Height: 4,140 mm (13 ft 7 in) (end cars); 4,050 mm (13 ft 3 in) (intermediate cars)
- Doors: 4 pairs per side
- Maximum speed: 110 km/h (70 mph)
- Traction system: Variable-frequency
- Traction motors: TDK6315-A (4 per motor car)
- Power output: 190 kW (250 hp) per motor
- Electric systems: 1,500 V DC (overhead wire)
- Current collection: Pantograph
- Multiple working: 1000 series, 12000 series
- Track gauge: 1,067 mm (3 ft 6 in)

Semboku 9300 series
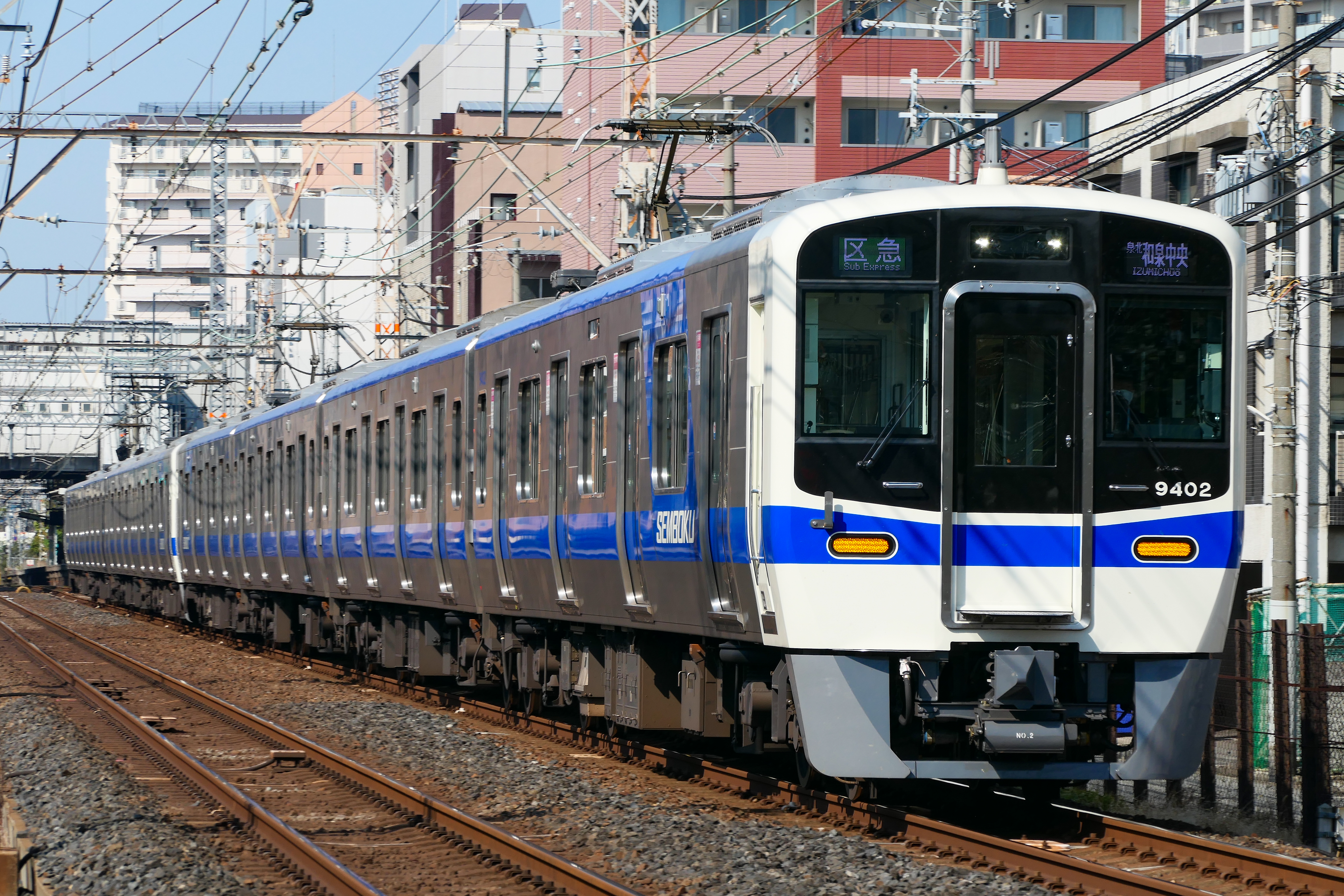
- A 9300 series set in October 2023
- In service: 8 August 2023 – present
- Manufacturer: Kinki Sharyo
- Constructed: 2022
- Number built: 8 vehicles (2 sets)
- Number in service: 8 vehicles (2 sets)
- Formation: 4 cars per trainset
- Operator: Nankai Electric Railway
- Lines served: Semboku Line; Nankai Main Line; Nankai Koya Line

Specifications
- Car body construction: Stainless steel
- Car length: 20,765 mm (68 ft 2 in) (end cars); 20,665 mm (67 ft 10 in) (intermediate cars)
- Width: 2,830 mm (9 ft 3 in)
- Height: 4,140 mm (13 ft 7 in) (end cars); 4,050 mm (13 ft 3 in) (intermediate cars)
- Doors: 4 per side
- Traction system: Variable-frequency
- Traction motors: TDK6315-A (4 per motor car)
- Power output: 190 kW (250 hp) per motor
- Electric systems: 1,500 V DC (overhead wire)
- Current collection: Pantograph
- Track gauge: 1,067 mm (3 ft 6 in)

Notes/references

The Nankai 8300 series (南海8300系) is an electric multiple unit (EMU) commuter train type operated by the private railway operator Nankai Electric Railway in Japan since 8 October 2015.

The similar Semboku 9300 series (泉北9300系, Senboku 9300-kei) runs on the Semboku Line and Nankai Koya Line in Japan since 8 August 2023. Two 4-car sets were built by Kinki Sharyo in 2022.

== Operations ==
The 8300 series trains are used on Nankai Main Line, Nankai Wakayamakō Line, and Nankai Airport Line commuter services singly or coupled with 12000 series EMUs on Southern Premium limited express services to provide non-reserved accommodation.

Since 22 November 2019, 8300 series trains have been used on Koya Line services. Nankai expects to deploy additional 8300 series trains and replace the entirety of the 6000 series fleet on the Koya Line by 2023.

The 9300 trainsets are intended for service between Namba and Izumi-Chūō stations on the Semboku Line, as well as through services onto the Nankai Koya Line.

== Formations ==
As of 1 April 2017, the fleet consists of five four-car sets (8301 to 8305) and six two-car sets (8701 to 8706). Two-car trainsets were also delivered from July 2016.

=== Four-car sets ===
The four-car sets are formed as follows, with two motored ("M") cars and two non-powered intermediate trailer ("T") cars.

| Designation | Mc1 | T1 | T2 | Mc2 |
| Numbering | 830x | 860x | 865x | 840x |

The motored cars each have one single-arm pantograph.

=== Two-car sets ===
The two-car sets are formed as follows, with one motored ("M") car and one non-powered trailer ("T") car.

| Designation | Tc1 | Mc3 |
| Numbering | 870x | 835x |

The motored cars each have two single-arm pantographs.

== Interior ==
Passenger accommodation consists of longitudinal seating with LED lighting used throughout.

Sets 8318/8716 onward incorporate wood-themed interiors.

The 9300 series uses LEDs for external and internal lighting, which Semboku states reduces power consumption by 50% when compared to the older 3000 series trains.

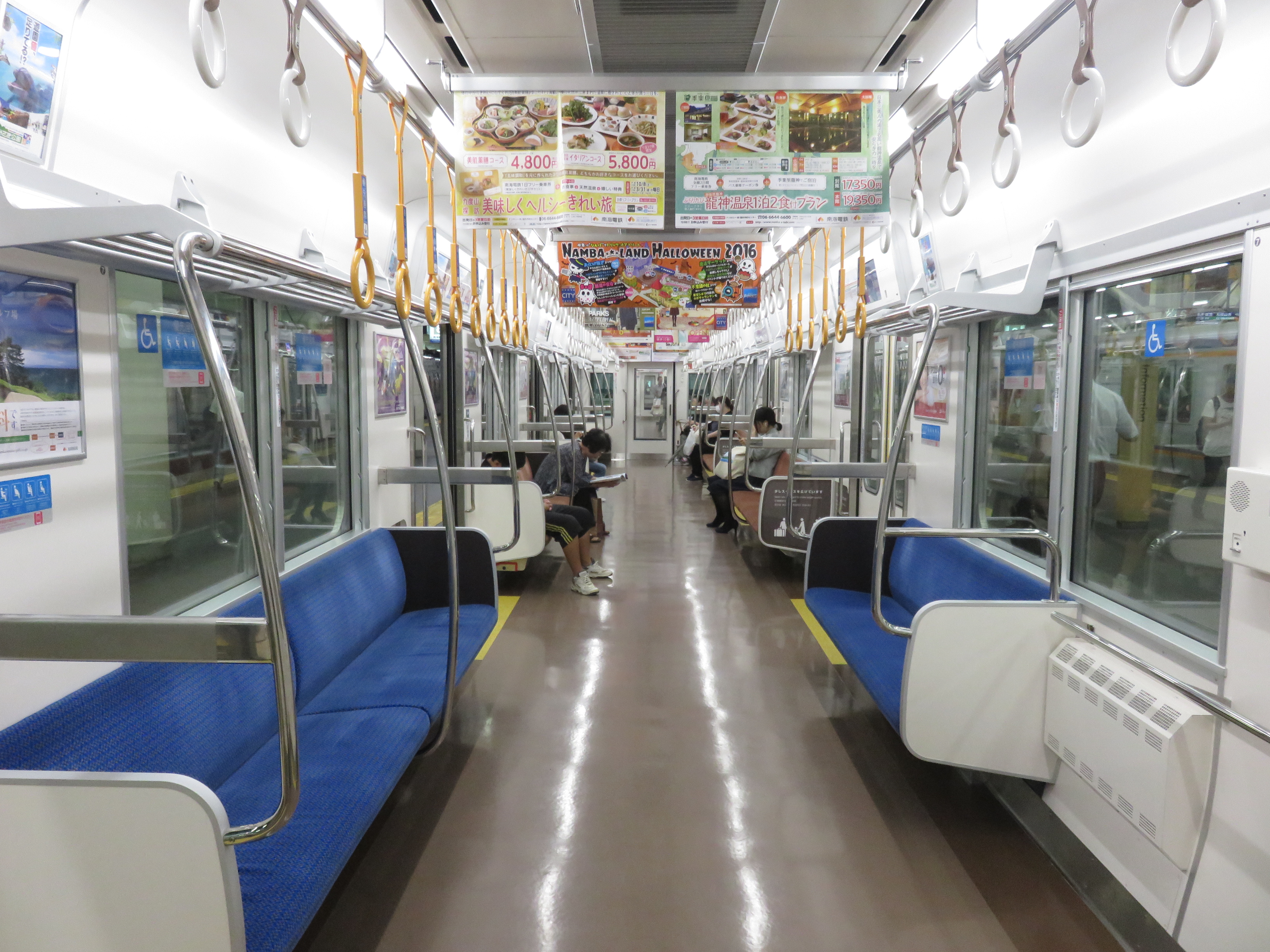
The interior of an 8300 series set in October 2016

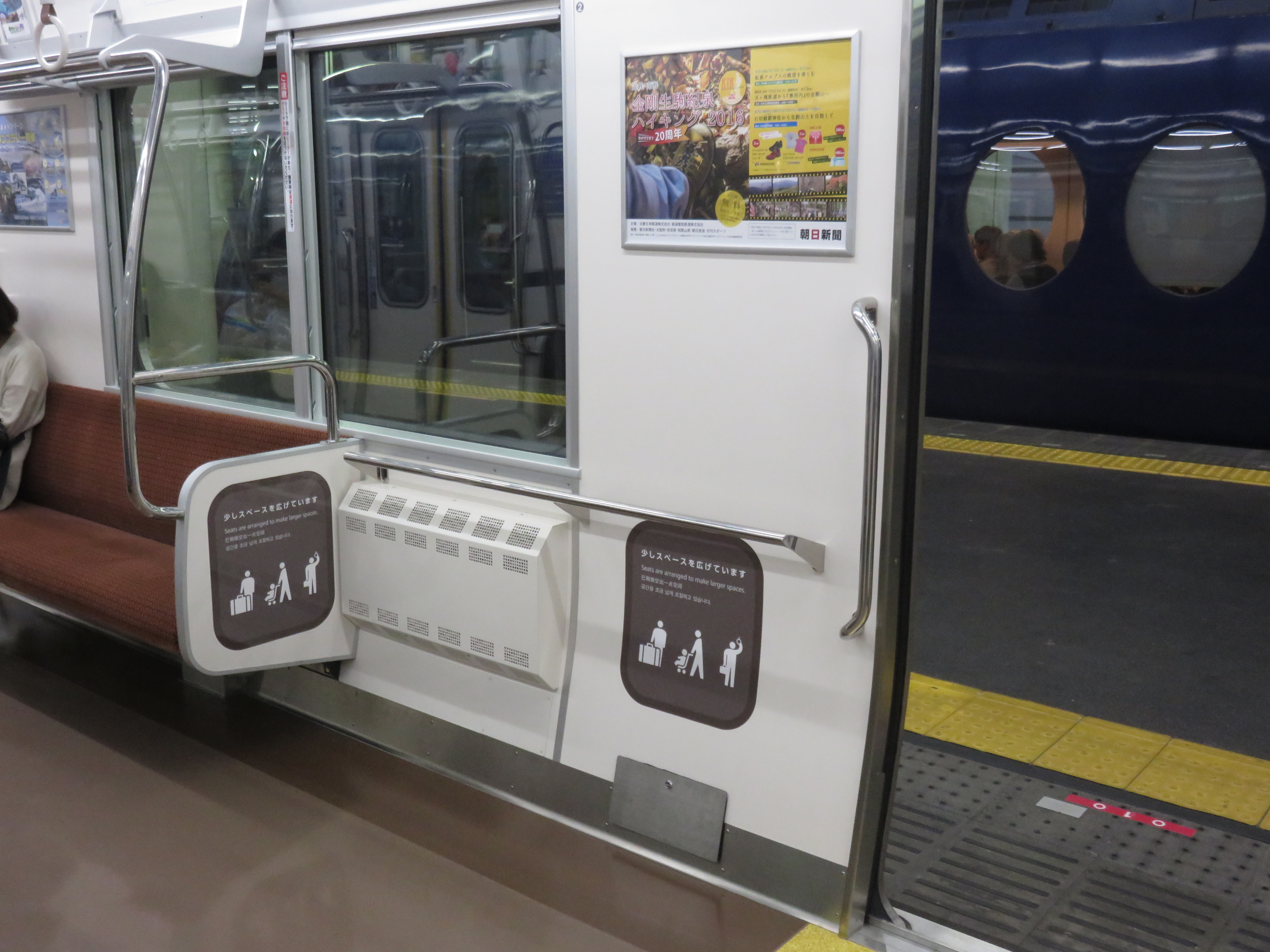
A luggage space inside an 8300 series set in October 2016

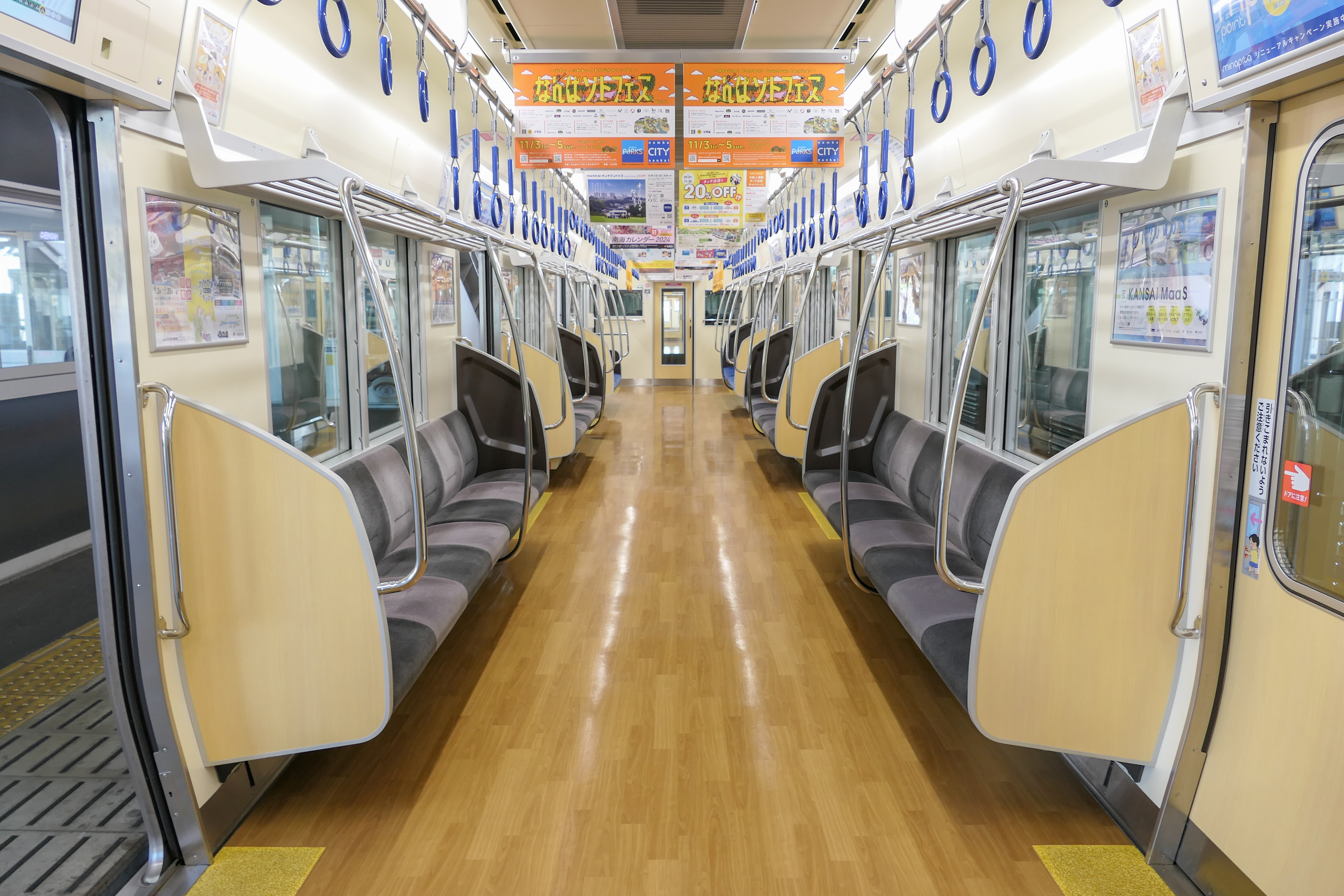
Wooden flooring and finishes in sets built from 2022

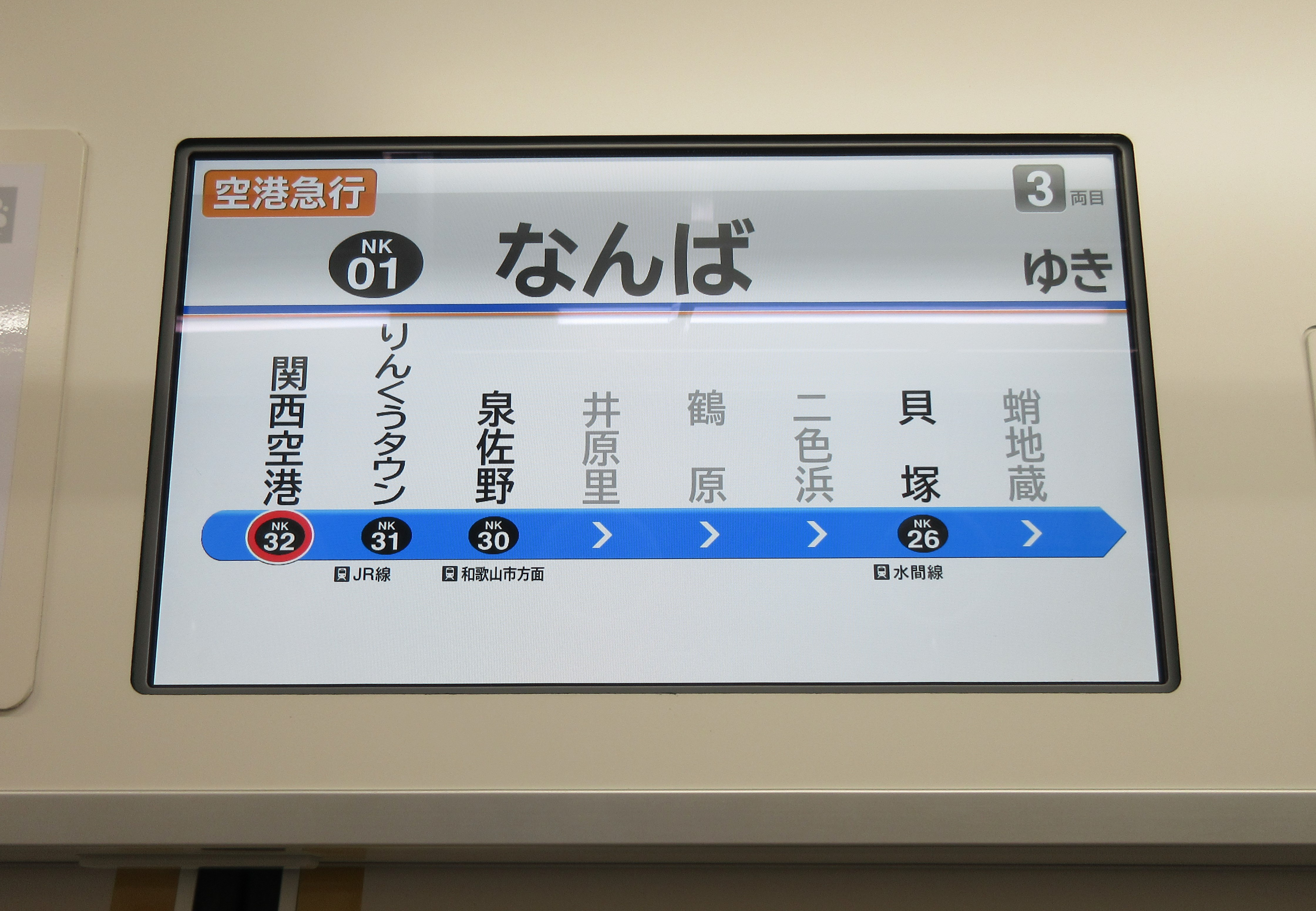
An LCD passenger information display inside an 8300 series set

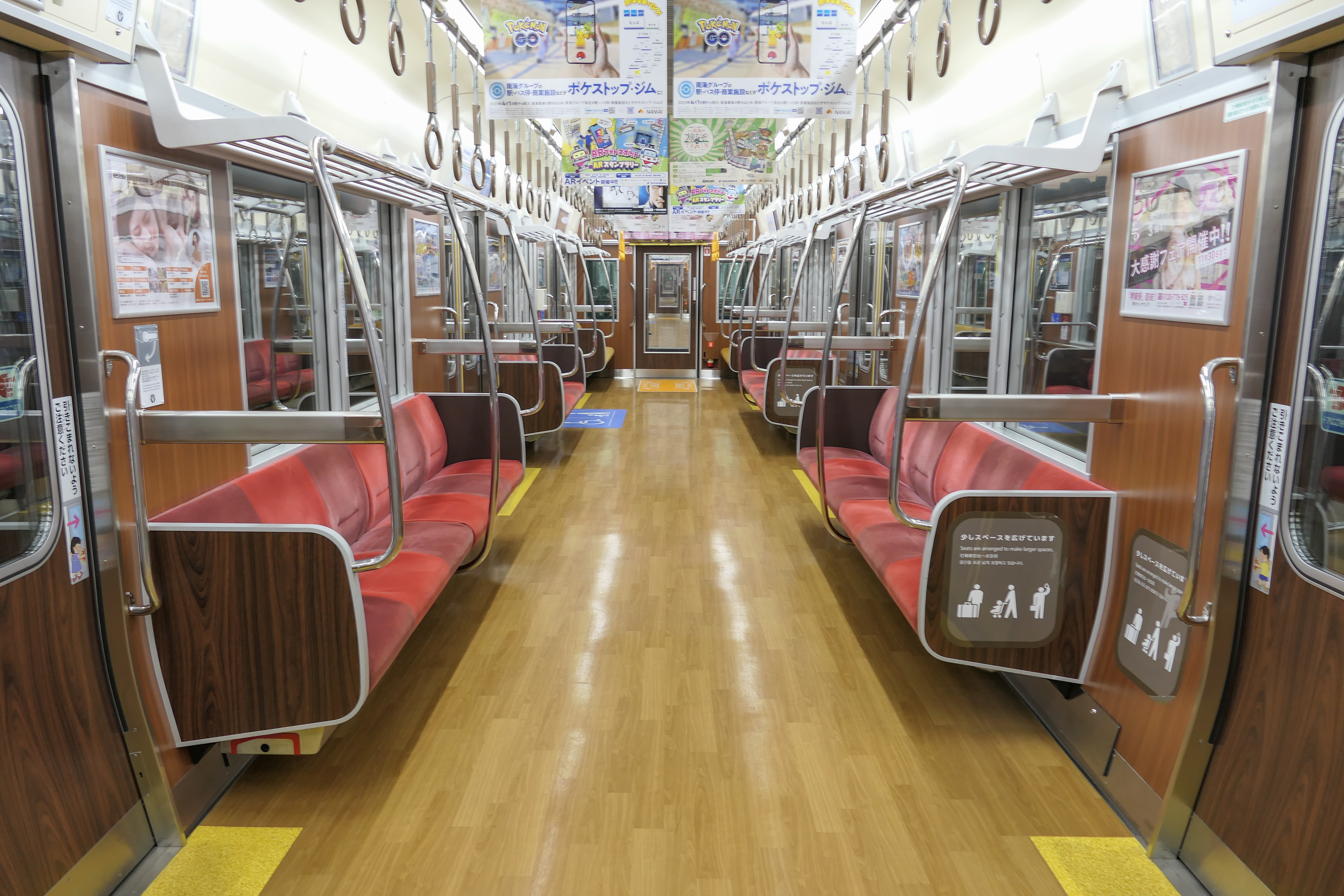
Interior

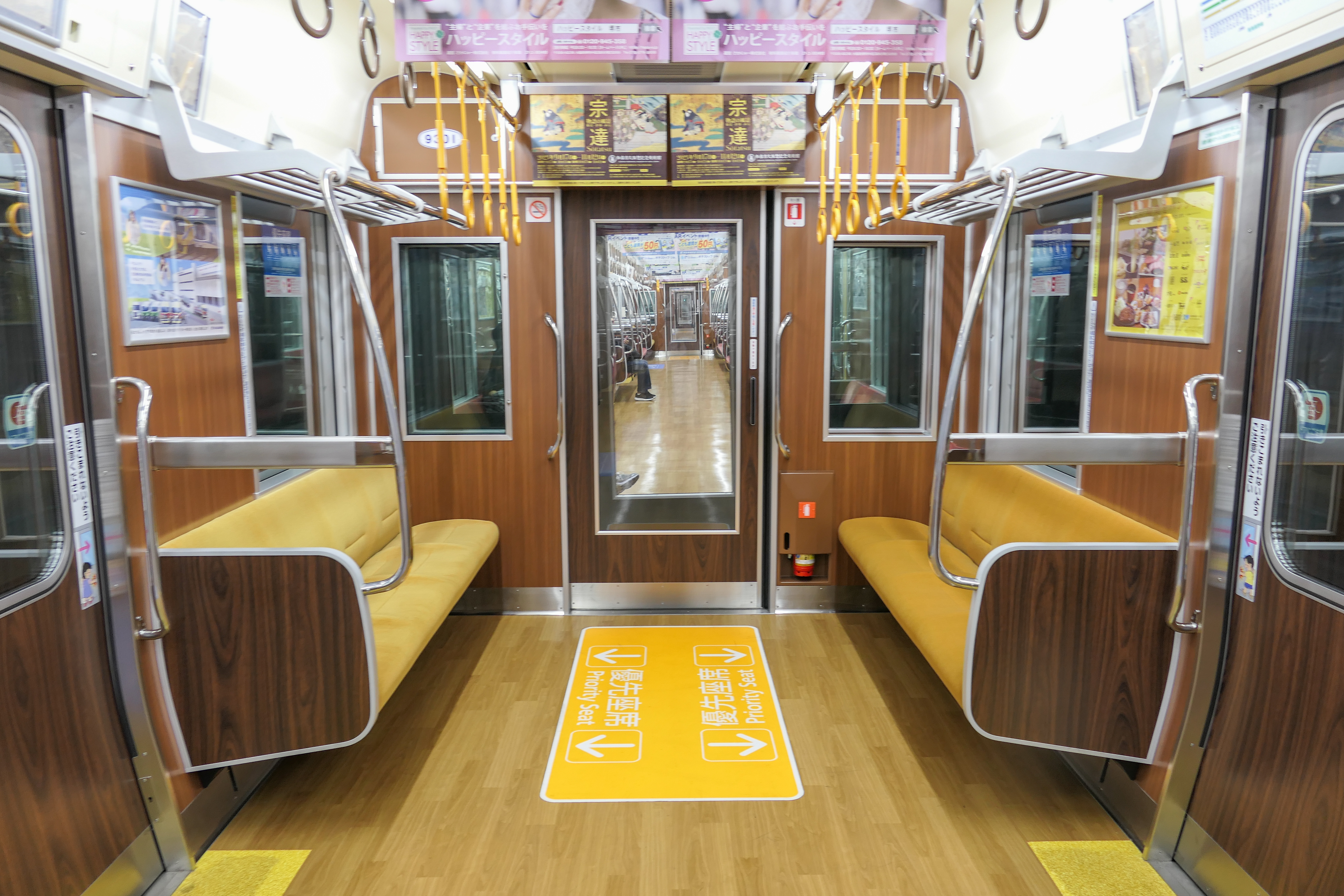
Priority seating

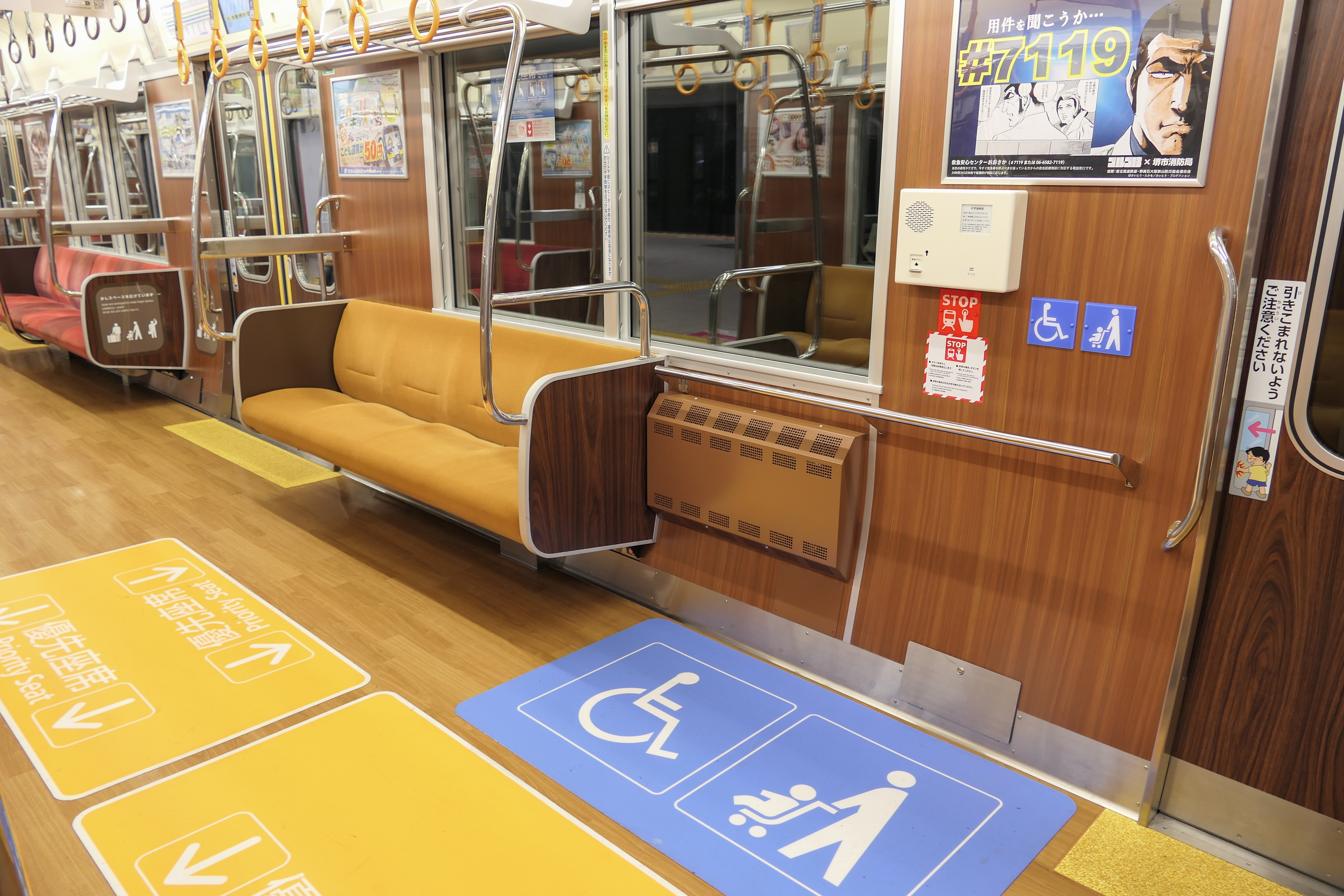
Wheelchair space

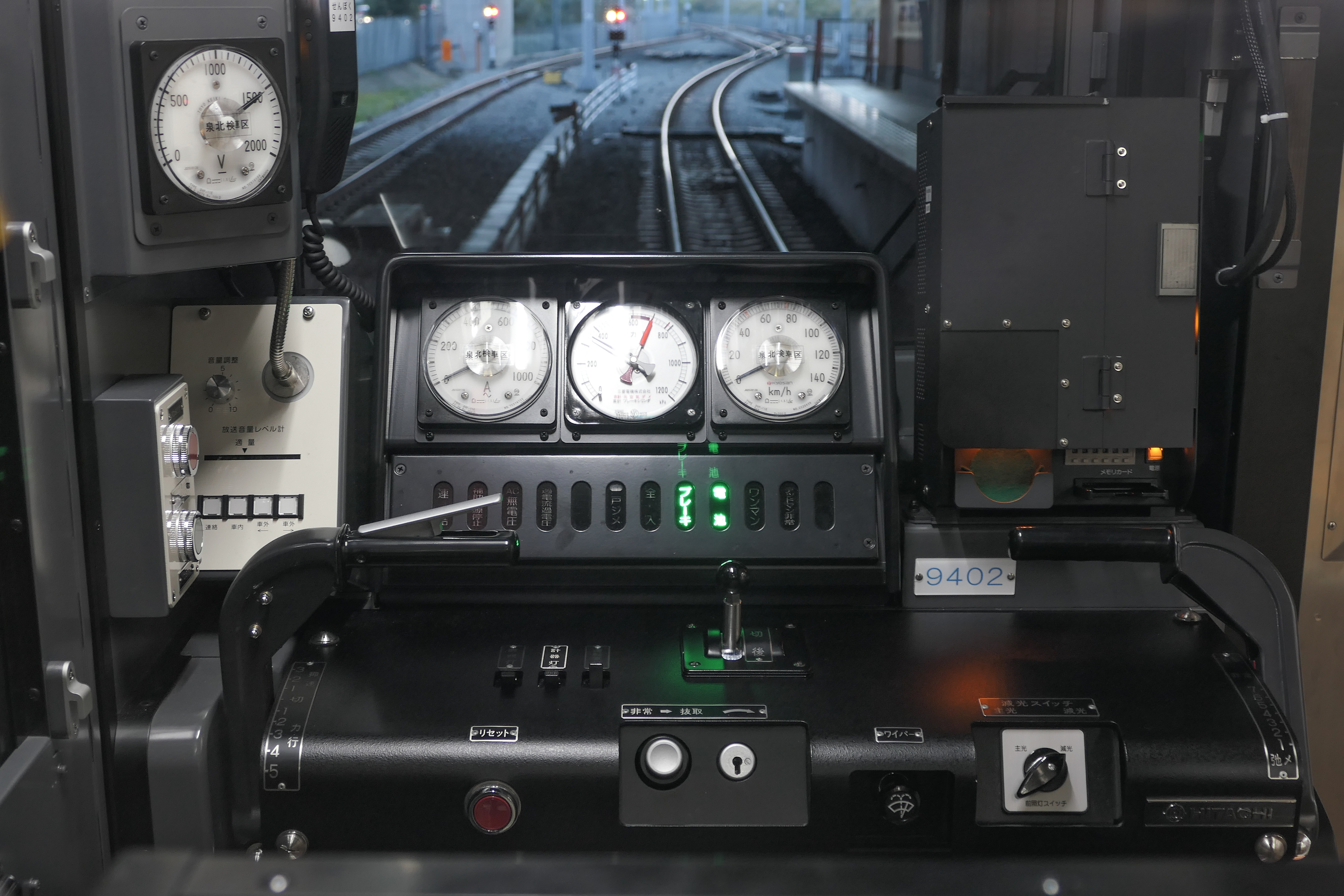
Driver's cab

== History ==
Details of the new trains were first announced officially by Nankai Electric Railway on 25 March 2015. The first two four-car sets, built by Kinki Sharyo, were delivered in June 2015. The first train entered revenue service on 8 October 2015.

Six two-car sets were delivered from Kinki Sharyo in July and August 2016. These entered revenue service on 12 September 2016.

=== 9300 ===
Details of the 9300 series were announced in November 2022. The two sets were built by Kinki Sharyo and delivered in December 2022.

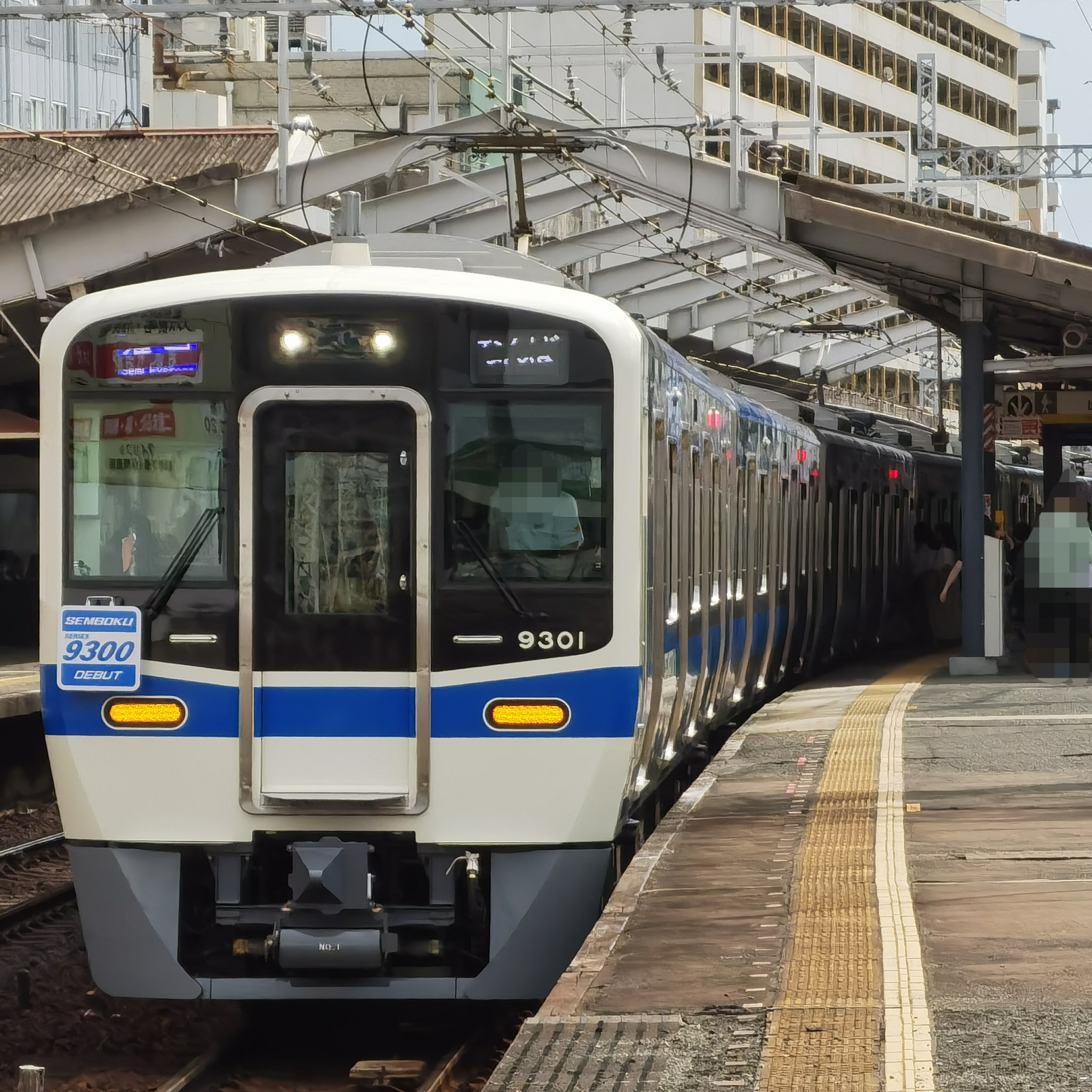
A 9300 series set with inaugural headmark, September 2023

The 9300 series fleet entered service for the Semboku Rapid Railway on 8 August 2023.

Following the merger of the Semboku Rapid Railway into its parent company on 1 April 2025, all sets became property of Nankai Electric Railway. To prepare for the acquisition, all identifying marks on existing trains were changed from Semboku to Nankai gradually from December 2024.

== Fleet history ==
The individual build details for the fleet are as follows.

=== Four-car sets ===
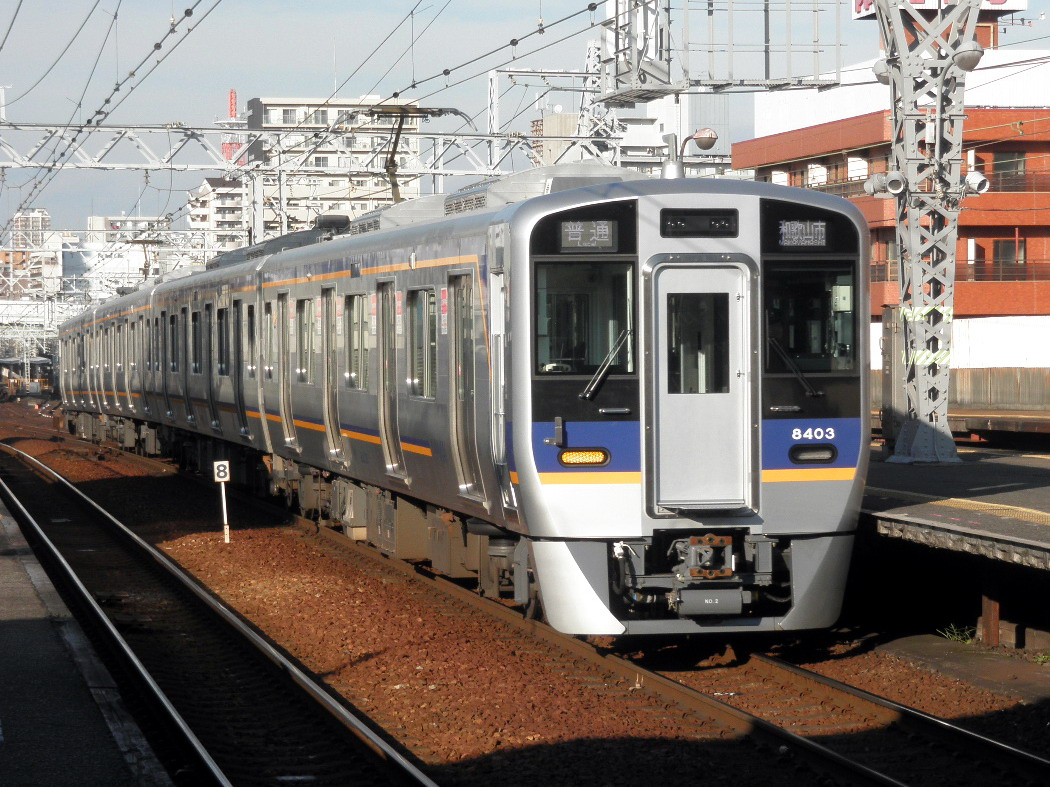
Four-car set 8303 in December 2015

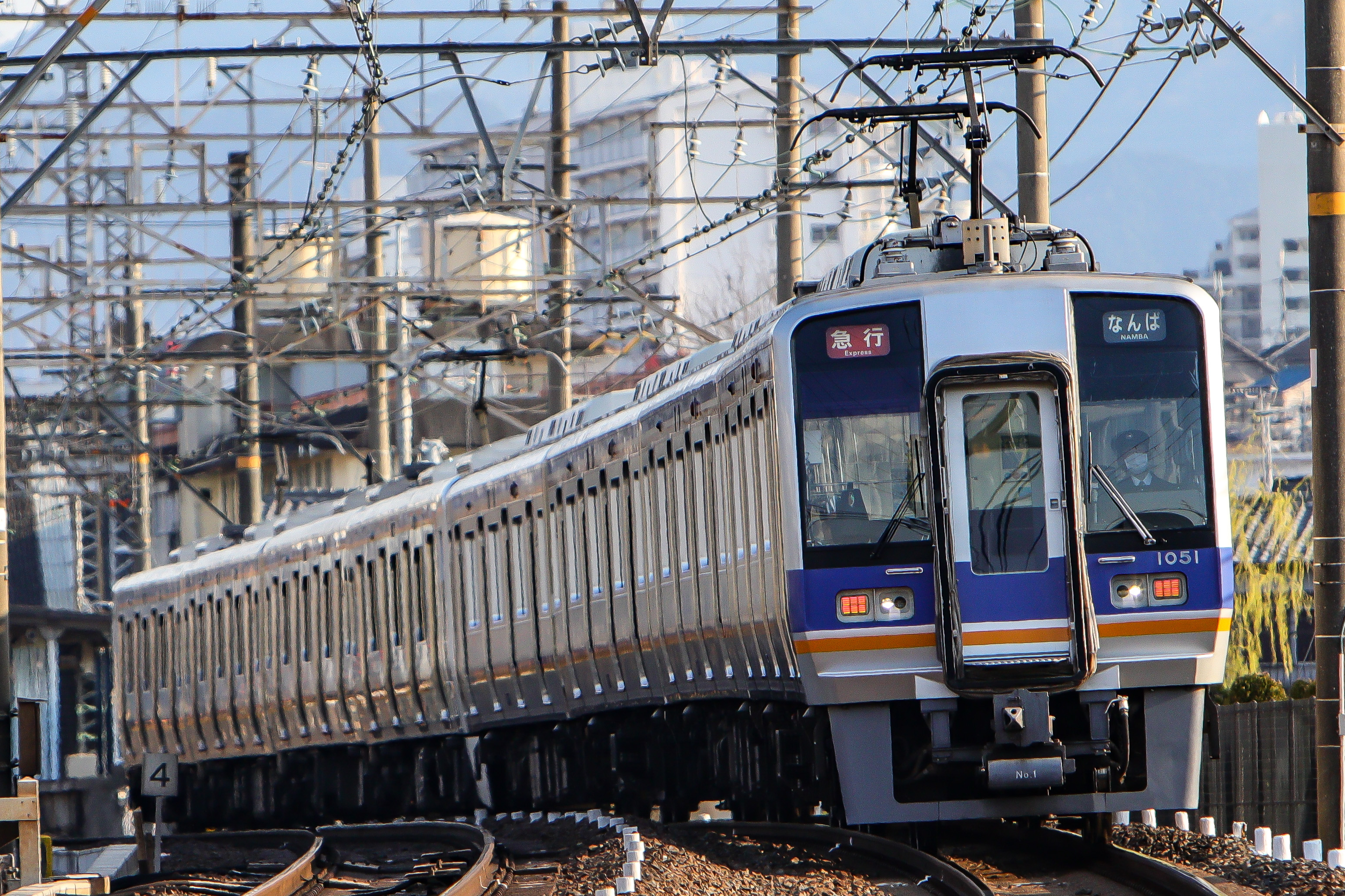
An 8300 series coupled with a 1000 series set on the Koya Line, March 2020

| Set No. | Manufacturer | Date delivered | Allocation |
|---|---|---|---|
| 8301 | Kinki Sharyo | 8 October 2015 | Main Line |
| 8302 | Kinki Sharyo | 8 October 2015 | Main Line |
| 8303 | Kinki Sharyo | 13 November 2015 | Main Line |
| 8304 | Kinki Sharyo | 1 December 2015 | Main Line |
| 8305 | Kinki Sharyo | 20 November 2015 | Main Line |
| 8306 | Kinki Sharyo | 2017 | Main Line |
| 8307 | Kinki Sharyo | 2017 | Main Line |
| 8308 | Kinki Sharyo | 2018 | Main Line |
| 8309 | Kinki Sharyo | 2018 | Main Line |
| 8310 | Kinki Sharyo | 2019 | Main Line (2019–2022) Koya Line (2022–present) |
| 8311 | Kinki Sharyo | 2019 | Main Line |
| 8312 | Kinki Sharyo | 2019 | Koya Line |
| 8313 | Kinki Sharyo | 2019 | Koya Line |
| 8314 | Kinki Sharyo | 2019 | Koya Line |
| 8315 | Kinki Sharyo | 2019 | Koya Line |
| 8316 | Kinki Sharyo | 2020 | Koya Line |
| 8317 | Kinki Sharyo | 2020 | Koya Line |
| 8318 | | January 2022 | Koya Line |
| 8319 | Kinki Sharyo | February 2022 | Koya Line |
| 8320 | | November 2022 | |
| 8321 | | December 2023 | |
| 8322 | | December 2023 | |
| 8323 | | 19 June 2024 | |
| 8324 | | 19 June 2024 | |
| 8325 | | January 2026 | |
| 8326 | | February 2026 | |
| 8327 | | 7 September 2026 | |
| 8328 | | 7 September 2026 | |

=== Two-car sets ===
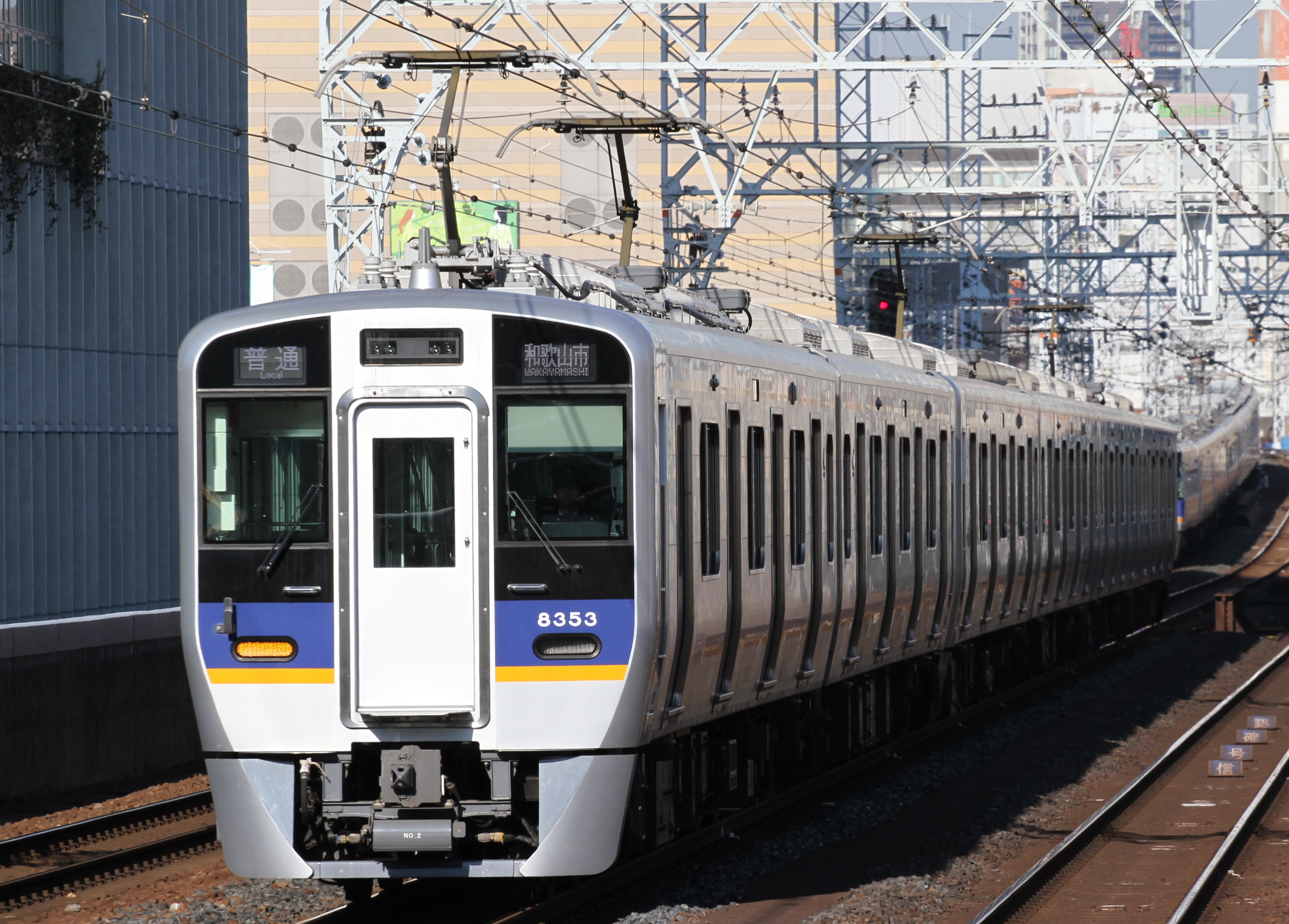
Two-car set 8703 leading a six-car formation in December 2016

| Set No. | Manufacturer | Date delivered | Allocation |
|---|---|---|---|
| 8701 | Kinki Sharyo | 12 September 2016 | Main Line |
| 8702 | Kinki Sharyo | 12 September 2016 | Main Line |
| 8703 | Kinki Sharyo | 12 September 2016 | Main Line |
| 8704 | Kinki Sharyo | 20 September 2016 | Main Line |
| 8705 | Kinki Sharyo | 20 September 2016 | Main Line |
| 8706 | Kinki Sharyo | 20 September 2016 | Main Line |
| 8707 | Kinki Sharyo | 2017 | Main Line |
| 8708 | Kinki Sharyo | 2017 | Main Line |
| 8709 | Kinki Sharyo | 2018 | Main Line |
| 8710 | Kinki Sharyo | 2018 | Main Line |
| 8711 | Kinki Sharyo | 2019 | Main Line (2019–2022) Koya Line (2022–present) |
| 8712 | Kinki Sharyo | 2019 | Main Line |
| 8713 | Kinki Sharyo | 2019 | Koya Line |
| 8714 | Kinki Sharyo | 2020 | Koya Line |
| 8715 | Kinki Sharyo | 2020 | Koya Line |
| 8716 | | January 2022 | Koya Line |
| 8717 | | February 2022 | Koya Line |
| 8718 | | November 2022 | |
| 8719 | | November 2024 | |
| 8720 | | November 2024 | |
| 8721 | | January 2026 | |
| 8722 | | February 2026 | |
| 8723 | | 7 September 2026 | |
| 8724 | | 7 September 2026 | |
