= Semboku 3000 series =

Japanese train type

Semboku/Nankai 3000 series
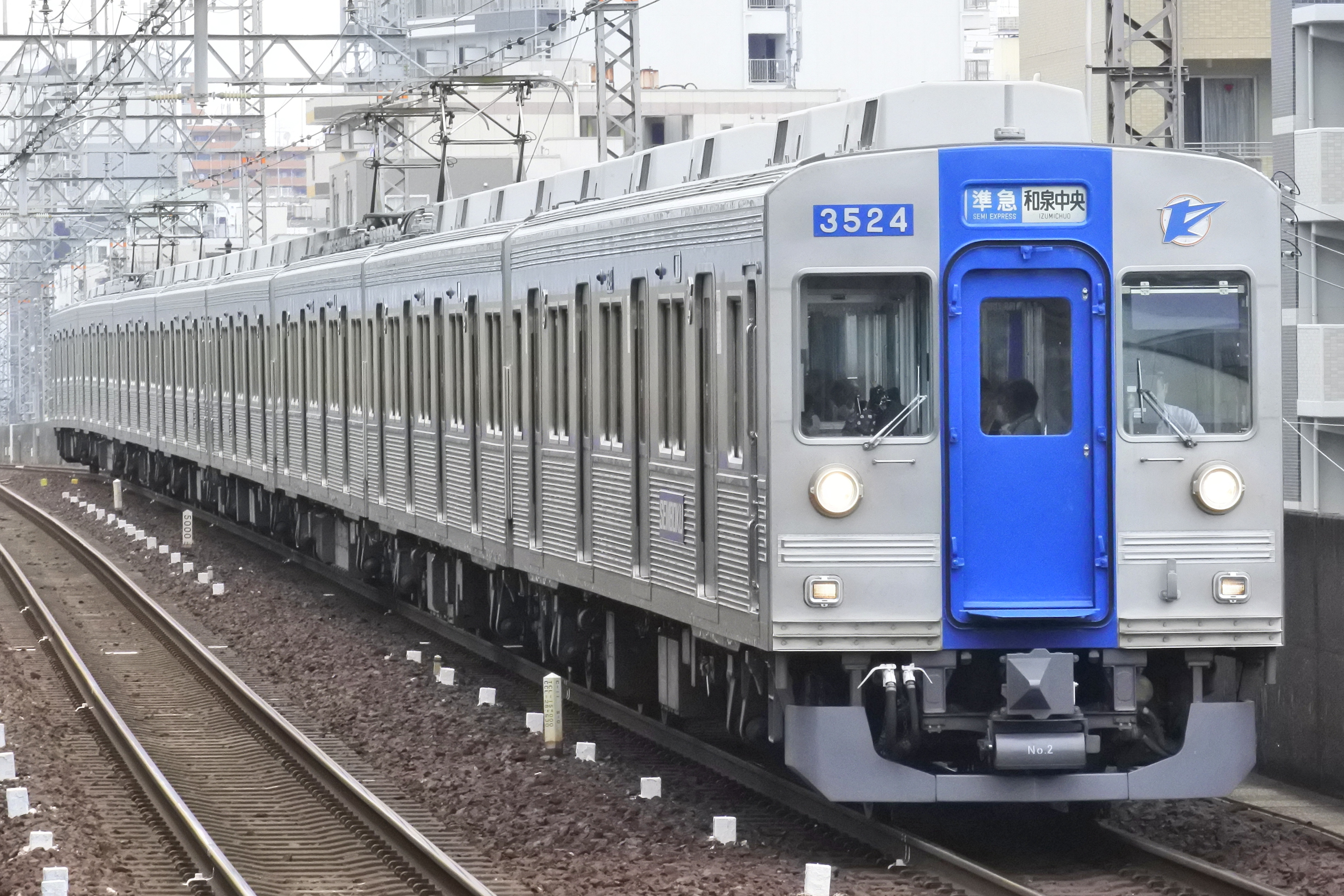
- Set 3523 in 2022
- In service: 1975–present
- Constructed: 1975–1990
- Number built: 60 vehicles
- Number in service: 20 vehicles (5 sets)
- Formation: 2/4/6 cars per trainset
- Operators: Semboku Rapid Railway (1975–2025); Nankai Electric Railway (2013–)
- Lines served: Kōya Line; Semboku Line; Main Line

Specifications
- Car body construction: Stainless steel
- Car length: 20,825 mm (68 ft 3.9 in) (end cars); 20,725 mm (67 ft 11.9 in) (intermediate cars)
- Width: 2,740 mm (9 ft 0 in)
- Height: 4,160 mm (13 ft 8 in)
- Doors: 4 pairs per side
- Traction system: Resistor control
- Electric system(s): 1,500 V DC overhead catenary
- Current collector(s): Pantograph
- Track gauge: 1,067 mm (3 ft 6 in)

Notes/references
- Specifications

The Semboku 3000 series (泉北3000系, Senboku 3000-kei) is an electric multiple unit (EMU) train type that was introduced by Semboku Rapid Railway in 1975. Since 2013, Nankai Electric Railway began operating former Semboku 3000 series sets, and these sets retain the 3000 series designation.

== Design ==
The 3000 series trains have stainless steel bodies. It was also the first train type operated by Semboku Rapid Railway to feature air-conditioning. The first three sets built in 1975 initially did not have air-conditioning units on the roofs but they were subsequently retrofitted with air-conditioning a year later.

== History ==
The first three six-car sets entered service on 3 April 1975 to augment the fleet of 100 series trains on the Semboku Rapid Railway Line (now Nankai Semboku Line). By 1990, a total of 60 vehicles were built.

From 1999 to 2000, three six-car sets (3511, 3513 and 3517) were shortened to four cars each. As a result, three new two-car sets (3551–3555) were formed from the extracted vehicles.

Withdrawals of the 3000 series commenced in 2006, starting with four cars of six-car set 3501. The remaining two intermediate cars were inserted into four-car set 3507 until it was also retired in 2007. Six-car sets 3503 and 3505 were withdrawn from service the following year.

On 31 July 2024, sets 3519 and 3523 returned to service in their original style which did not include the operator nameplate and blue stripes on the sides.

=== Replacement ===
With the introduction of newer Semboku 9300 series trains in August 2023, the remainder of the Semboku 3000 series fleet is scheduled to be progressively replaced by the new train type. As of July 2024, only sets 3519 and 3523 remained in service with Semboku Rapid Railway.

=== Transfer to Nankai Electric Railway ===
With the reduction in the number of 10-car trains on the Semboku Rapid Railway Line from the start of the revised timetable on 23 November 2012, three four-car sets (3513–3517) and one two-car set (3555) were subsequently sold to Nankai Electric Railway. Sets 3517 and 3555 were sent to Chiyoda Depot in December 2012 to undergo modification works, followed by sets 3513 and 3515 on 10 May 2013. Sets 3517 and 3555 were combined to form a semi-permanently coupled six-car train. They first entered revenue service with Nankai on 28 September 2013.

Set 3513 was involved in a derailment accident in July 2024 and the two lead cars were officially withdrawn in August of the same year while the two intermediate cars of this set were inserted into set 3515 to make it a six-car set.

On 1 April 2025, following the merger of Semboku Rapid Railway into its parent company, sets 3519 and 3523 also became property of Nankai Electric Railway.

== Gallery ==
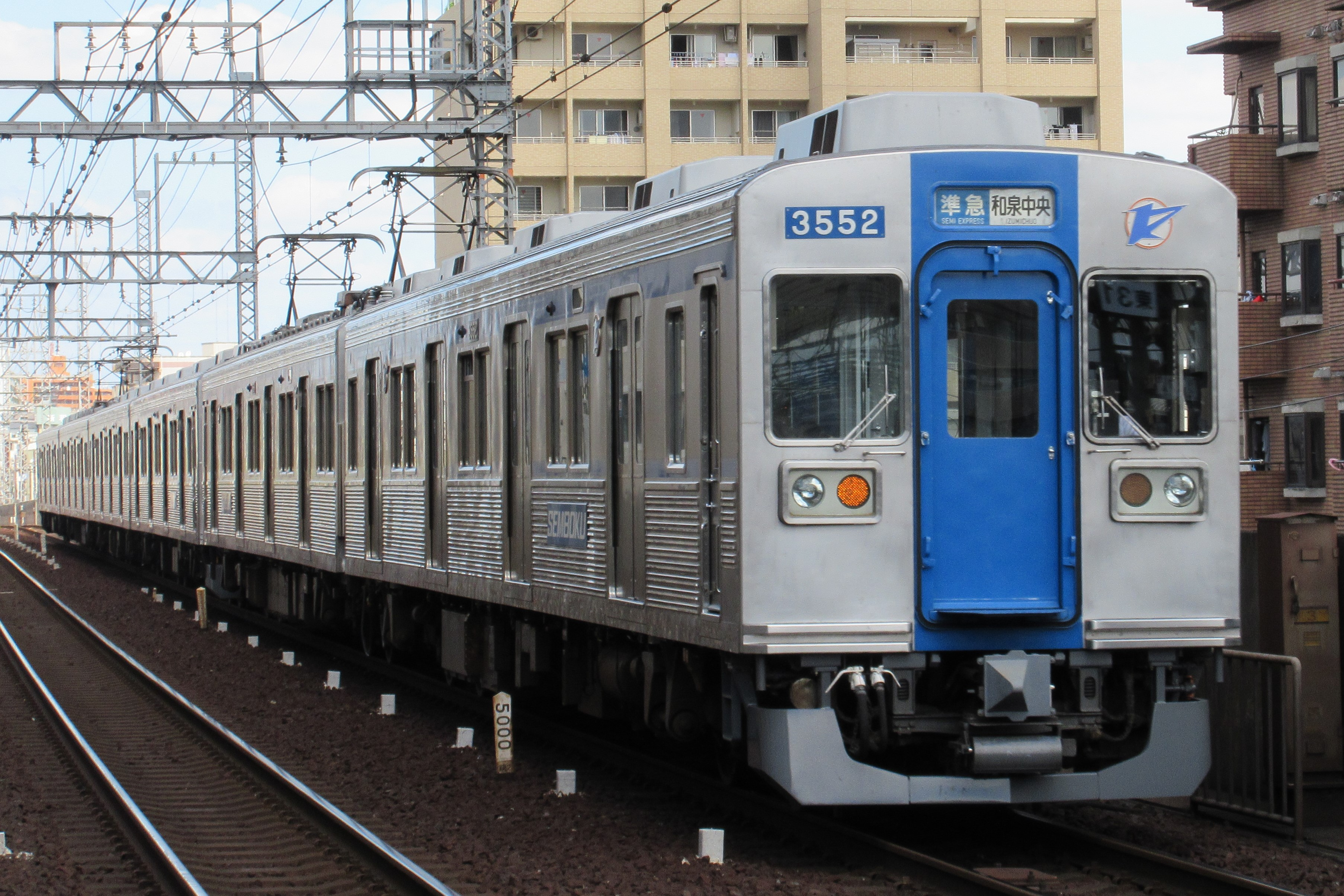
Two-car set 3551 in 2015

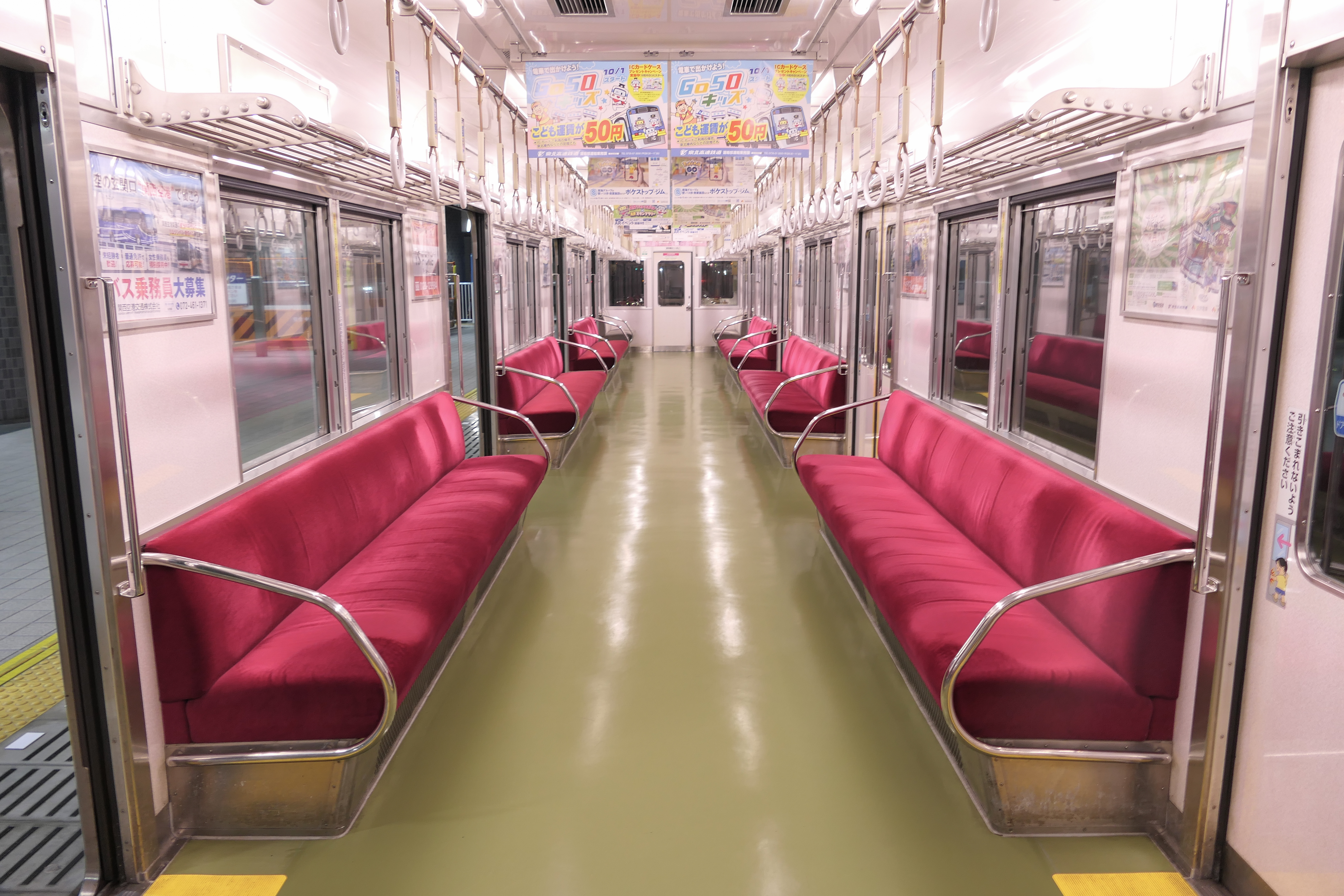
Interior view of a 3000 series car in 2023

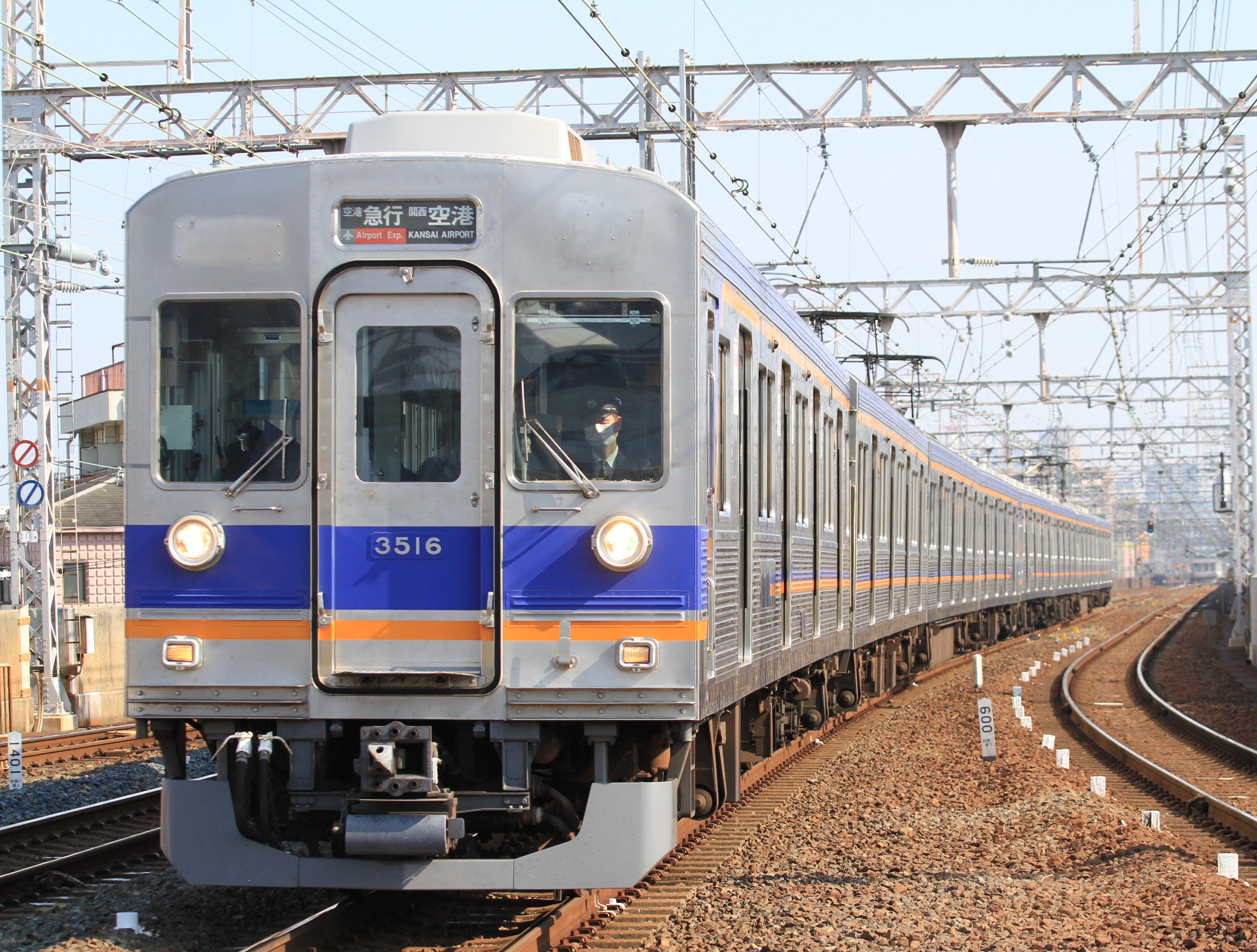
Set 3515 in the Nankai Electric Railway livery in 2017
