= Nankai 1000 series =

Japanese electric multiple unit train type

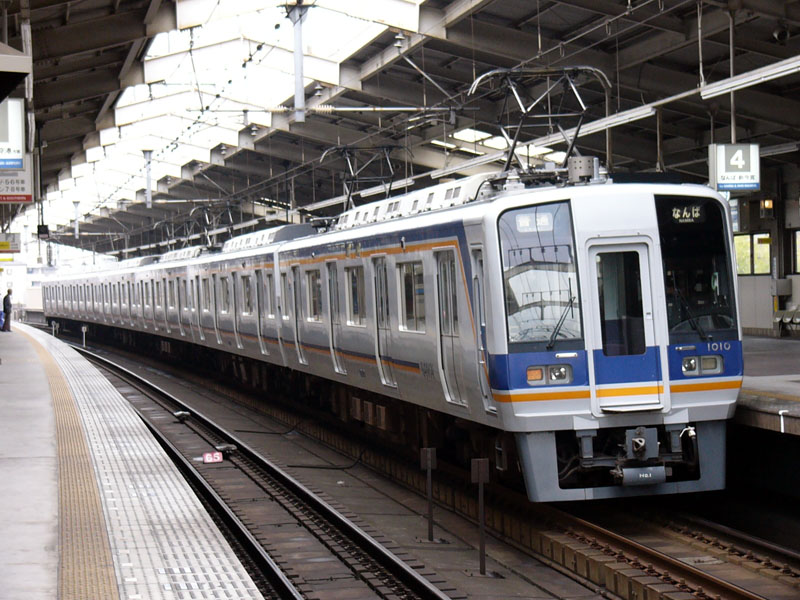
- Nankai 1010 at Tengachaya Station
- In service: 1992–
- Manufacturer: Tokyu Car Corporation
- Constructed: 1992–2001
- Entered service: 1 July 1992
- Refurbished: 2016-
- Number built: 76 vehicles (17 sets)
- Number in service: 76 vehicles (17 sets)
- Formation: 2/4/6 cars per trainset
- Fleet numbers: 1001–1010, 1031–1036, 1051
- Operator: Nankai Electric Railway
- Lines served: Nankai Main Line, Nankai Airport Line, Nankai Tanagawa Line, Nankai Koya Line

Specifications
- Car body construction: Stainless steel
- Width: 2,744 mm (9 ft 0 in) (Primary car); 2,850 mm (9 ft 4 in) (Intermediate car)
- Doors: 4 pairs per side
- Maximum speed: 110 km/h (68 mph) (Main line, Airport line); 100 km/h (62 mph) (Koya Line)
- Traction system: GTO–VVVF; IGBT–VVVF (1050 series)
- Acceleration: 2.5 km/(h⋅s) (1.6 mph/s)
- Deceleration: 3.7 km/(h⋅s) (2.3 mph/s)
- Electric system: 1,500 V DC overhead wire
- Current collection: Pantograph
- Multiple working: 8000 series 8300 series
- Track gauge: 1,067 mm (3 ft 6 in)

The Nankai 1000 series (南海1000系) is an electric multiple unit (EMU) train type operated by the private railway operator Nankai Electric Railway in Japan since 1992.

== Operations ==
The 1000 series is used mainly on Nankai Line commuter services singly or coupled with 8000 series or 8300 series EMUs. 12 vehicles (one each of a two-car, four-car and six-car sets) are allocated for service on the Koya line.

== Formations ==
As of June 2020, the fleet consists of ten six-car sets (1001 to 1010), one four-car set (1051), and six two-car sets (1031 to 1036). All the "Tc" and "Tc1" cars are at the Osaka-Namba end. The sets are formed as follows.

=== 2-car sets ===
The first half of the 2-car sets, 1031 to 1033, were part of the first batch which was completed in 1992.

| Designation | Mc1 | Tc |
| Numbering | MoHa 1031 | KuHa 1701 |

- The "M1" car is fitted with two scissors-type pantographs.

=== 4-car set ===
The four-car set was built in 2001 and is designated as 1050 series.

| Designation | Mc1 | M1 | M2 | Tc2 |
| Numbering | MoHa 1051 | SaHa 1851 | MoHa 1151 | KuHa 1751 |

- The "Mc1" car is fitted with two single arm-type pantographs.
- The "M1" car is designated as a "mildly air-conditioned" car.

=== 6-car sets ===
The first three of the 6-car sets, 1001 to 1003, were part of the first batch which was completed in 1992.

| Designation | Mc1 | T2 | M2 | T1 | M1 | Tc |
| Numbering | MoHa 1001 | SaHa 1801 | MoHa 1301 | SaHa 1601 | MoHa 1101 | KuHa 1501 |

- The "Mc1" and "M2" cars are fitted with two scissors-type pantographs.
- The "M2" car is designated as a "mildly air-conditioned" car.

== Interior ==
All cars feature longitudinal seating throughout except in the car ends where there are two rows of seats in a 2+2 configuration which face each other.

== History ==
These trains are the second rendition of the 1000 series. The original 1000 series, renumbered to the 11001 series in their later years, were retired between 1985 and 1987. This train type entered service on 1 July 1992.

The sets were refurbished between 2017 and 2020. Works included upgrades to passenger display information and installation of multi-language LCD screens above the car doors inside the trains.

== Gallery ==
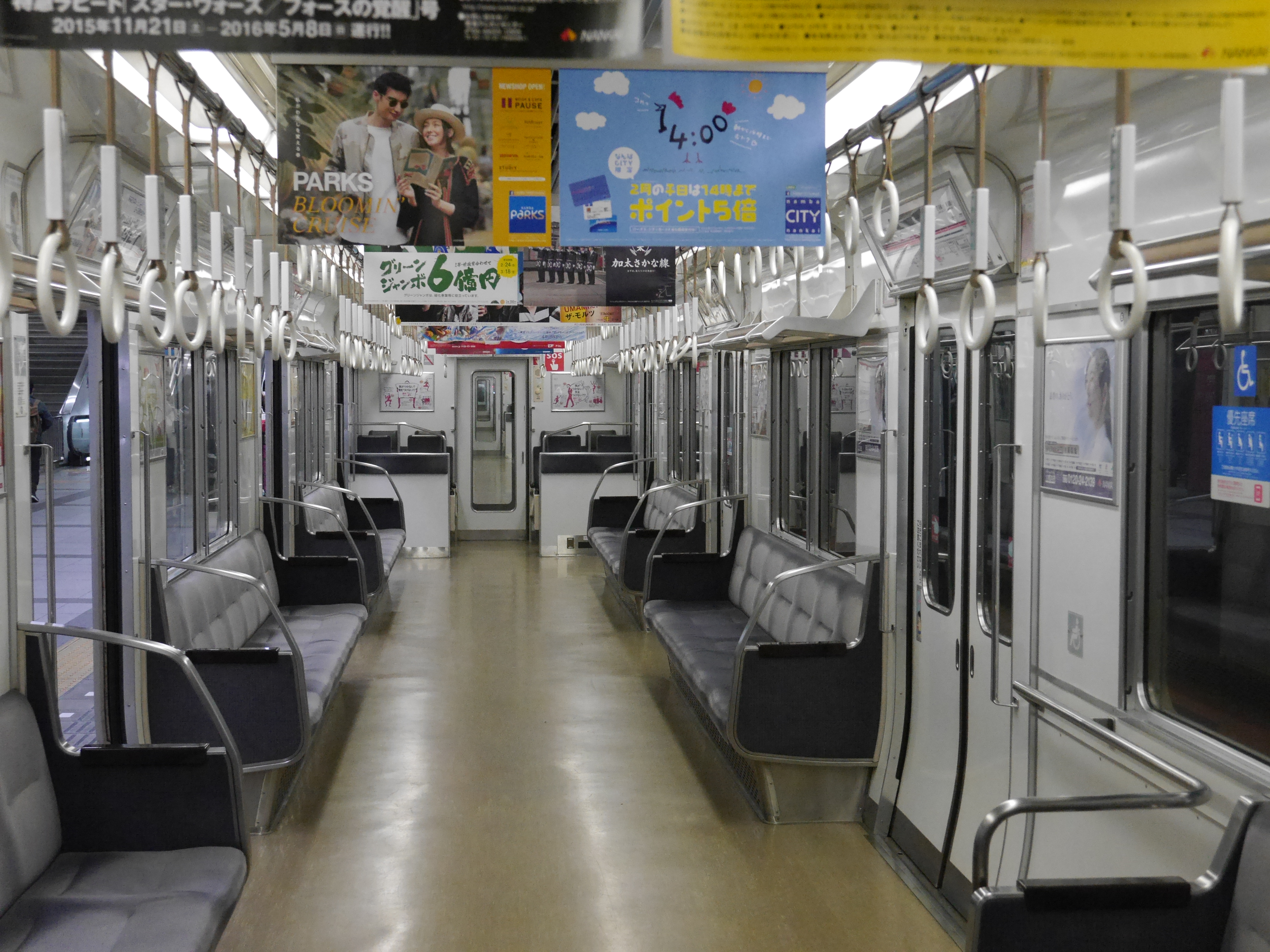
Inside the KuHa 1507 car

LED destination signs as a result of the refurbishment project

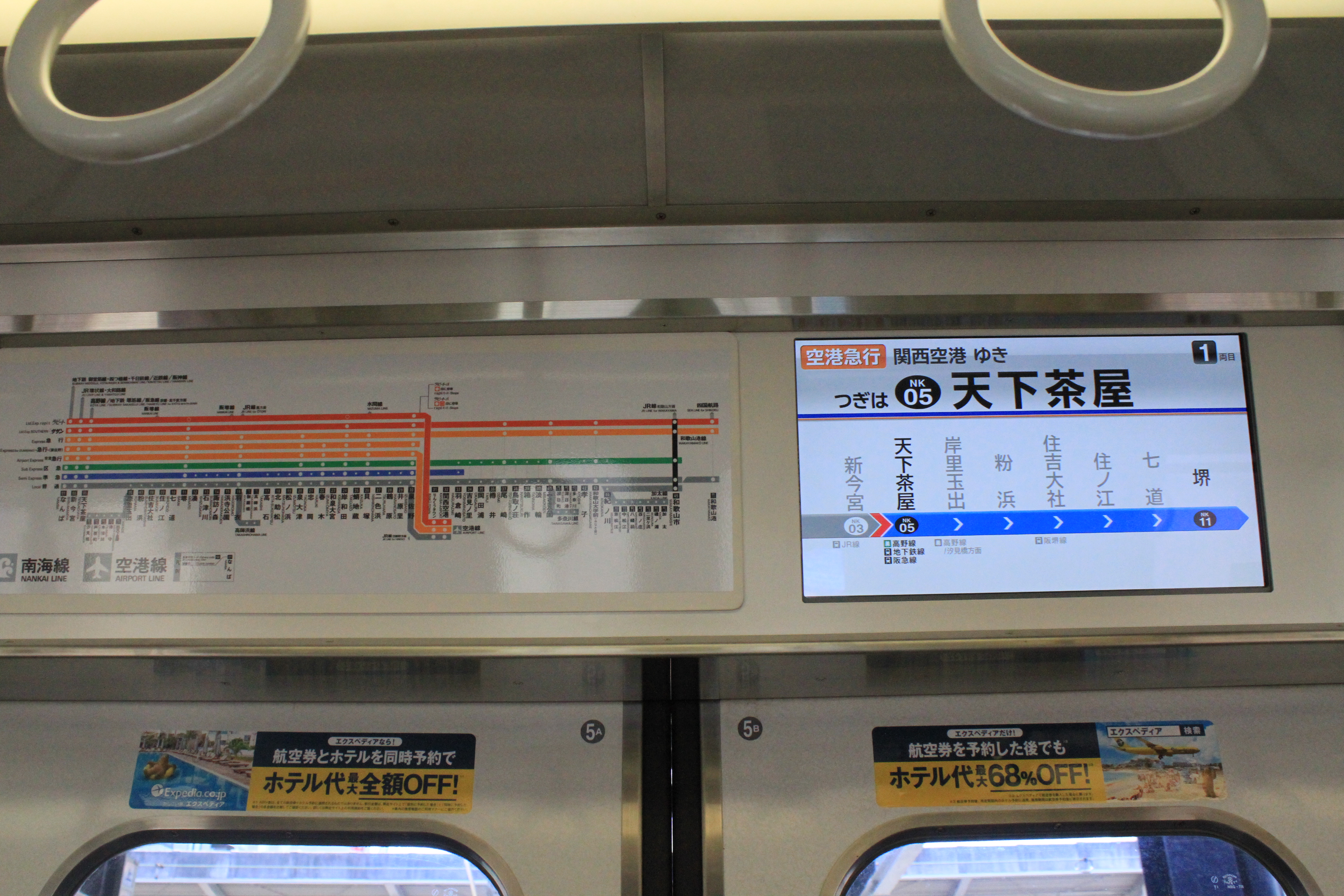
LCD screens inside the train resulting from refurbishment

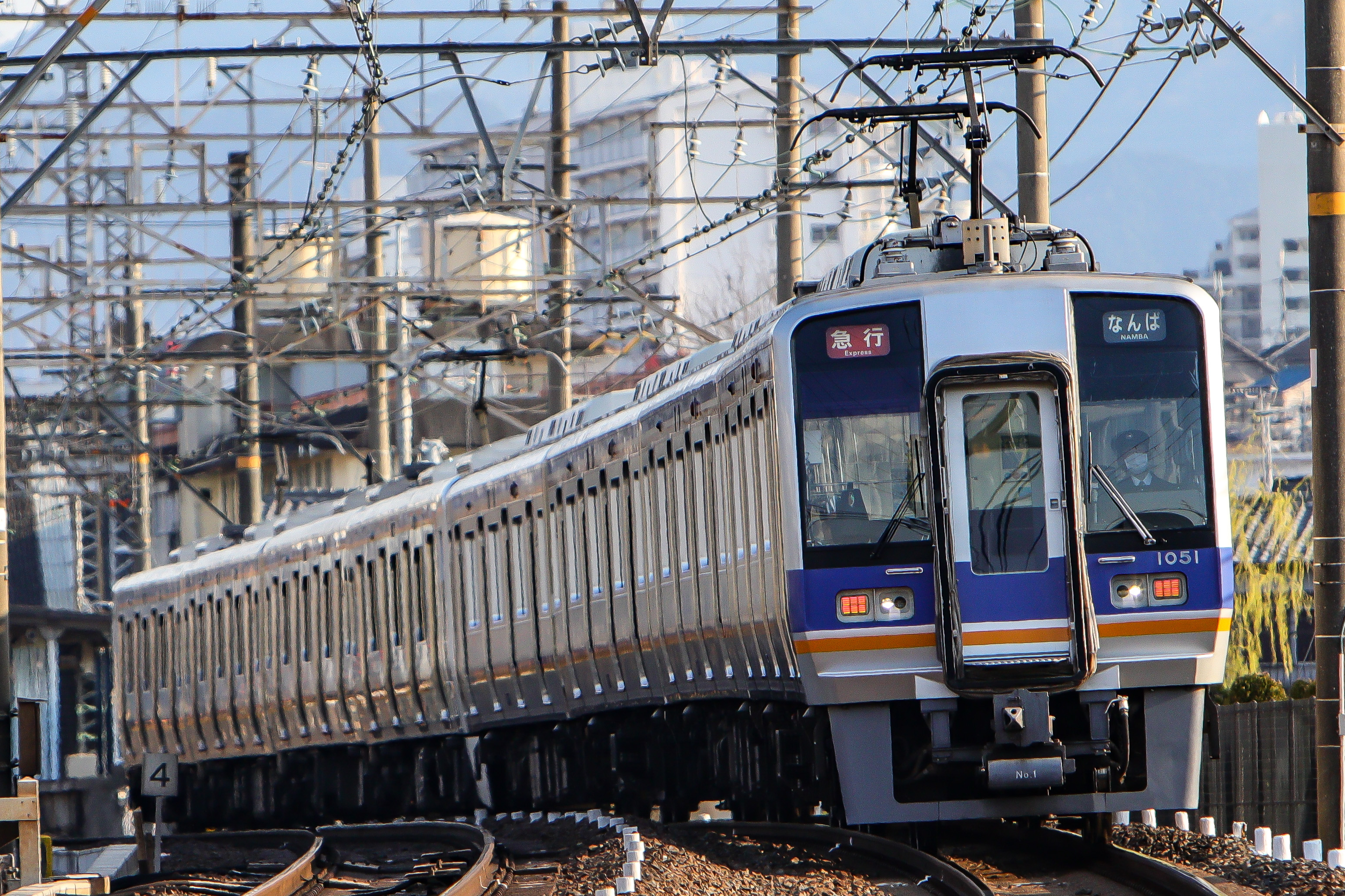
The lone four-car set attached to an 8300 series set on an express service to Osaka-Namba
