= Nankai 6000 series =

Japanese electric multiple unit train type

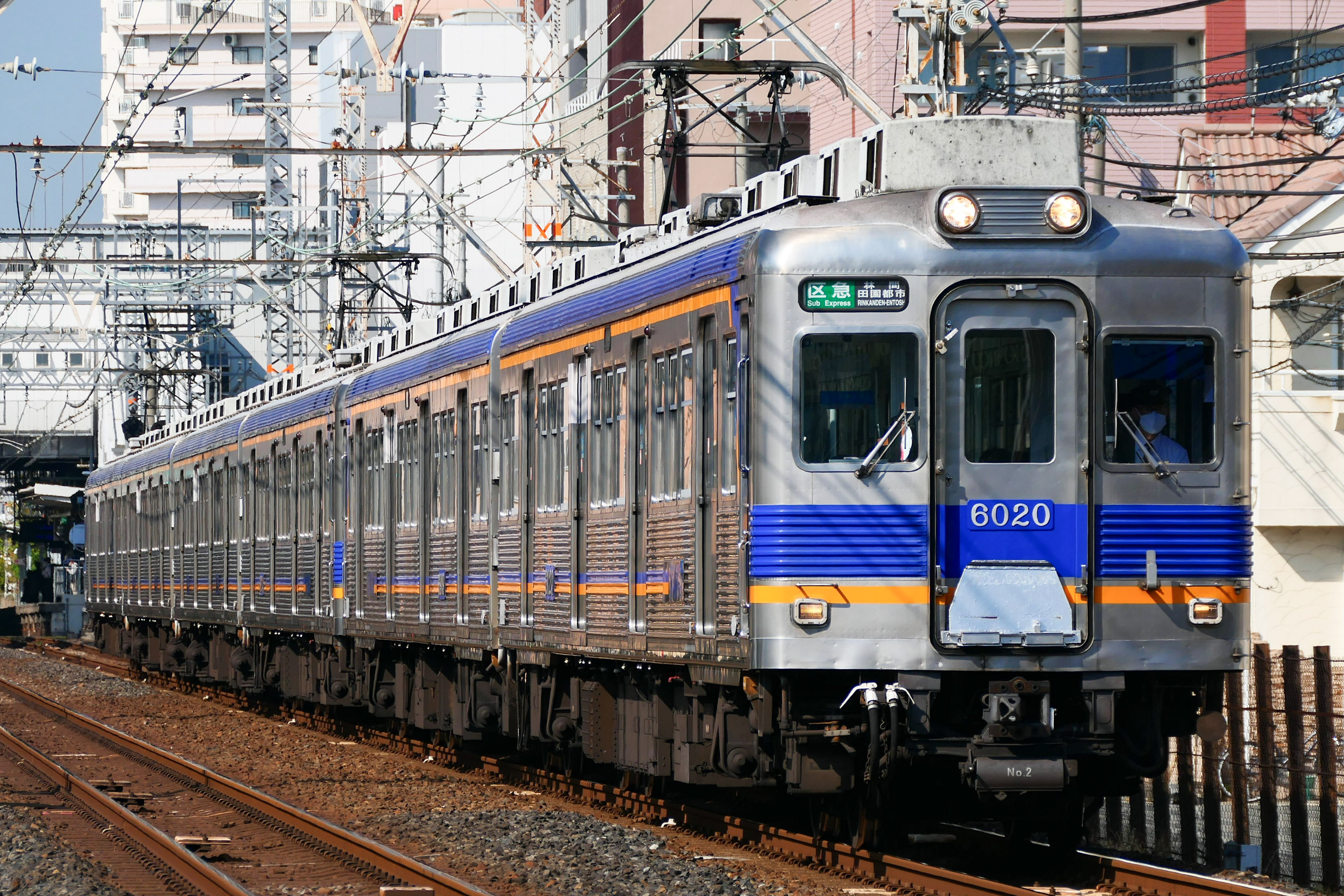
- 6000 series formation in October 2023
- In service: 1962–
- Manufacturer: Tokyu Car Corporation
- Constructed: 1962–1969
- Entered service: 25 December 1962
- Refurbished: 1985
- Number built: 50 vehicles (18 sets)
- Number in service: 18 vehicles (9 sets)
- Number scrapped: 26 vehicles (7 sets)
- Formation: 2/4 cars per trainset
- Fleet numbers: 6001–6036
- Operator: Nankai Electric Railway
- Line served: Nankai Koya Line

Specifications
- Car body construction: Stainless steel
- Car length: 20,725 mm (68 ft 0 in)
- Width: 2,744 mm (9 ft 0 in)
- Height: 4,160 mm (13 ft 8 in)
- Doors: 4 pairs per side
- Maximum speed: 100 km/h (62 mph)
- Traction system: DC Series Motor
- Power output: 145 kW
- Acceleration: 2.5 km/(h⋅s) (1.6 mph/s)
- Electric system: 600/1,500 V DC overhead wire
- Current collection: Pantograph
- Bogies: Budd Pioneer (original); FS-392C (powered car, refurbished set); FS-092A/FS-355 (trailer car, refurbished set)
- Track gauge: 1,067 mm (3 ft 6 in)

The Nankai 6000 series (南海6000系) is an electric multiple unit (EMU) train type operated by the private railway operator Nankai Electric Railway in Japan since 1962.

== Operations ==
The 6000 series is used mainly on Nankai Koya Line commuter services.

== Formations ==
As of June 2020, the fleet consists of 11 two-car sets and seven four-car sets. Aside from six two-car sets, the "Mc1" cars are at the Osaka-Namba end. The sets are formed as follows.

=== 2-car sets ===
The "MoHa 6001" car faces Osaka-Namba on five sets. On the remaining six sets, the car faces Izumi-Chuo.

Designation	Mc1	Tc
Numbering	MoHa 6001	KuHa 6901

- The "Mc1" car is fitted with one scissors-type pantograph.

=== 4-car sets ===
The "MoHa 6001" car faces Osaka-Namba.

Designation	Mc1	T1	T2	Mc2
Numbering	MoHa 6001	SaHa 6601	SaHa 6601	MoHa 6001

- The "Mc2" car is fitted with one scissors-type pantograph.

== Interior ==
All cars feature longitudinal seating throughout. Since these are older cars, they lack many features found in modern sets such as LCD screens and light-up maps.

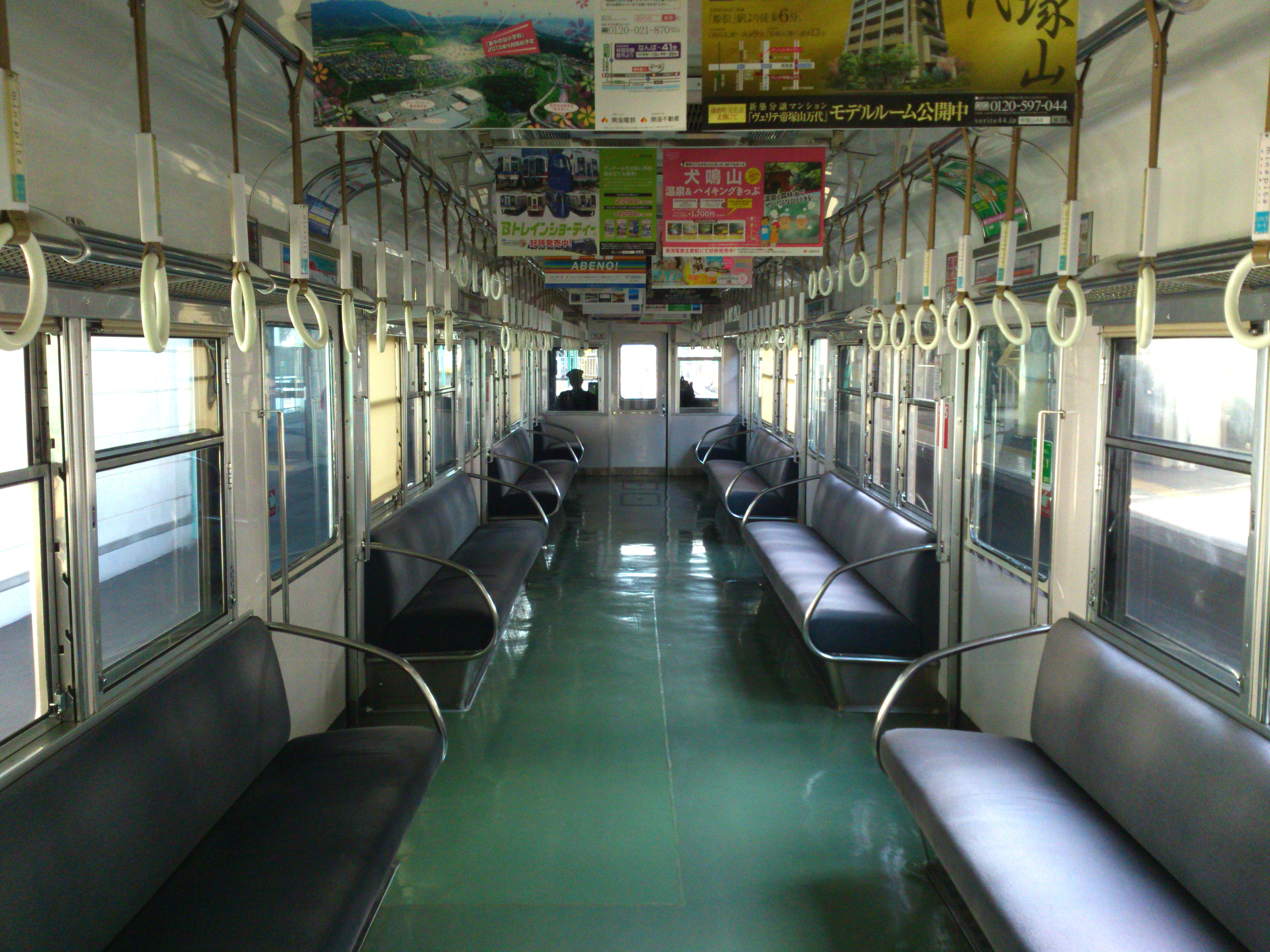
Inside an end car of the 6000 series

== History ==
The first four batches arrived in seven three-car sets. The current 2-car and 4-car formations were formed in 1971.

The first set to be scrapped was four-car set 6035 on 17 October 2019. Since then, three more four-car sets as well as three two-car sets have been scrapped for a total of 22 cars being scrapped. It is generally rare for any rail car to last beyond 50 years in service.

Two more 2-car sets were retired in March 2022: 6022 and 6034.

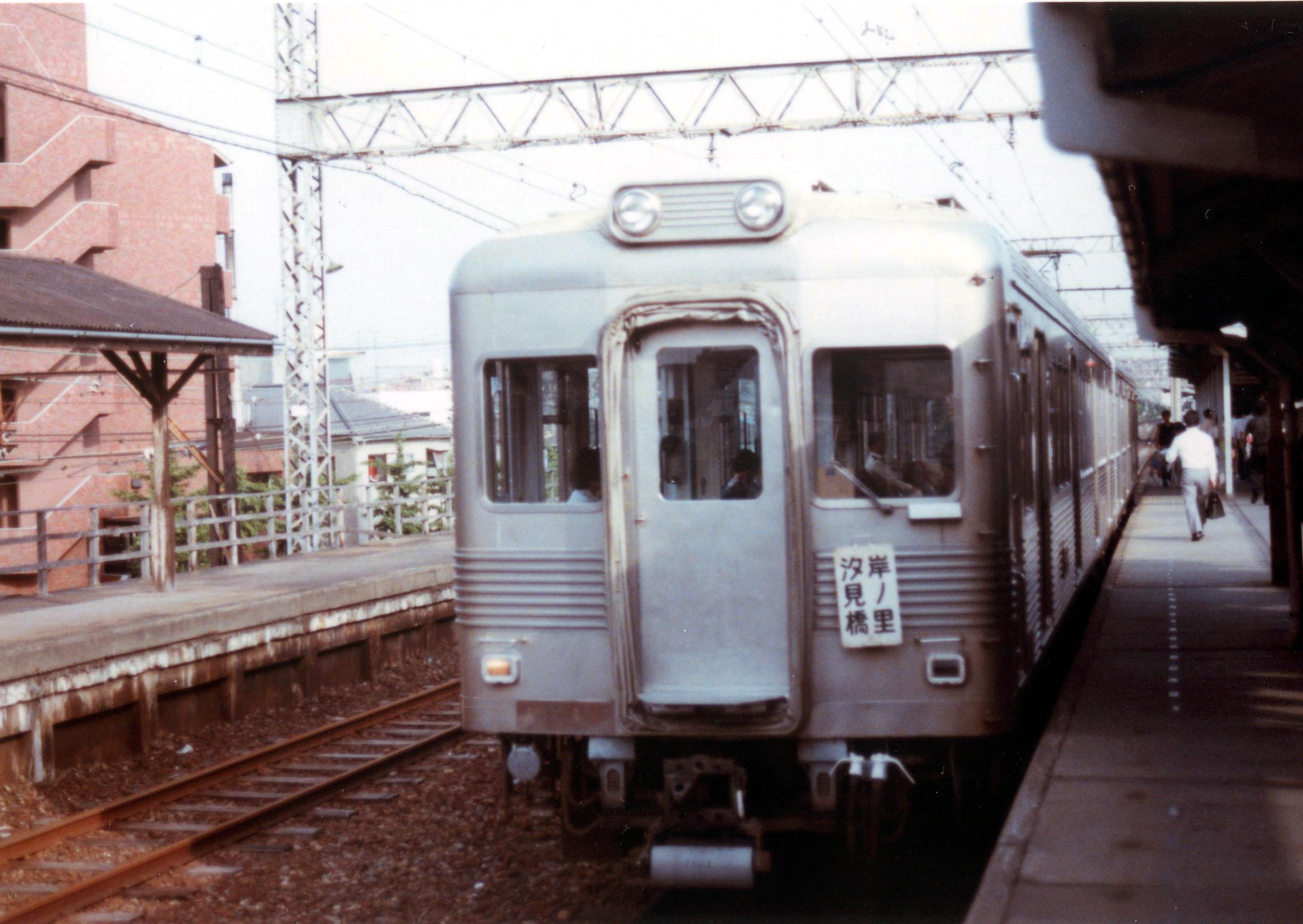
6000 series original style

== Resale ==
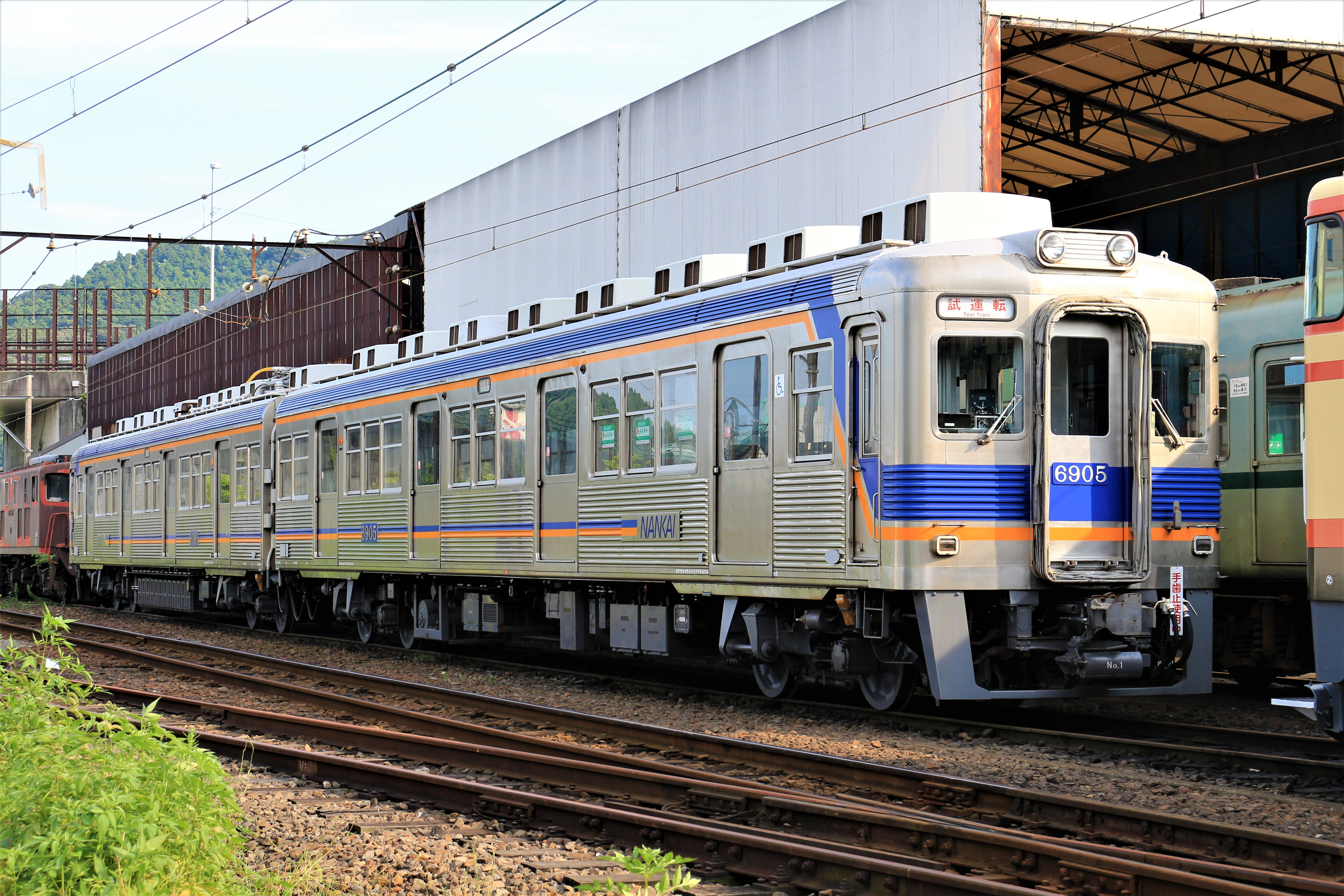
Set 6905 following transfer to the Ōigawa Railway, August 2022

Two-car set 6905 was transferred to the Ōigawa Railway in July 2020. On 25 December 2024, it was announced that the set would enter revenue service on 30 December of that year.
