= Osaka =

Designated city in Kansai, Japan

Osaka 大阪市
- Prefecture capital and Designated city
- Osaka City
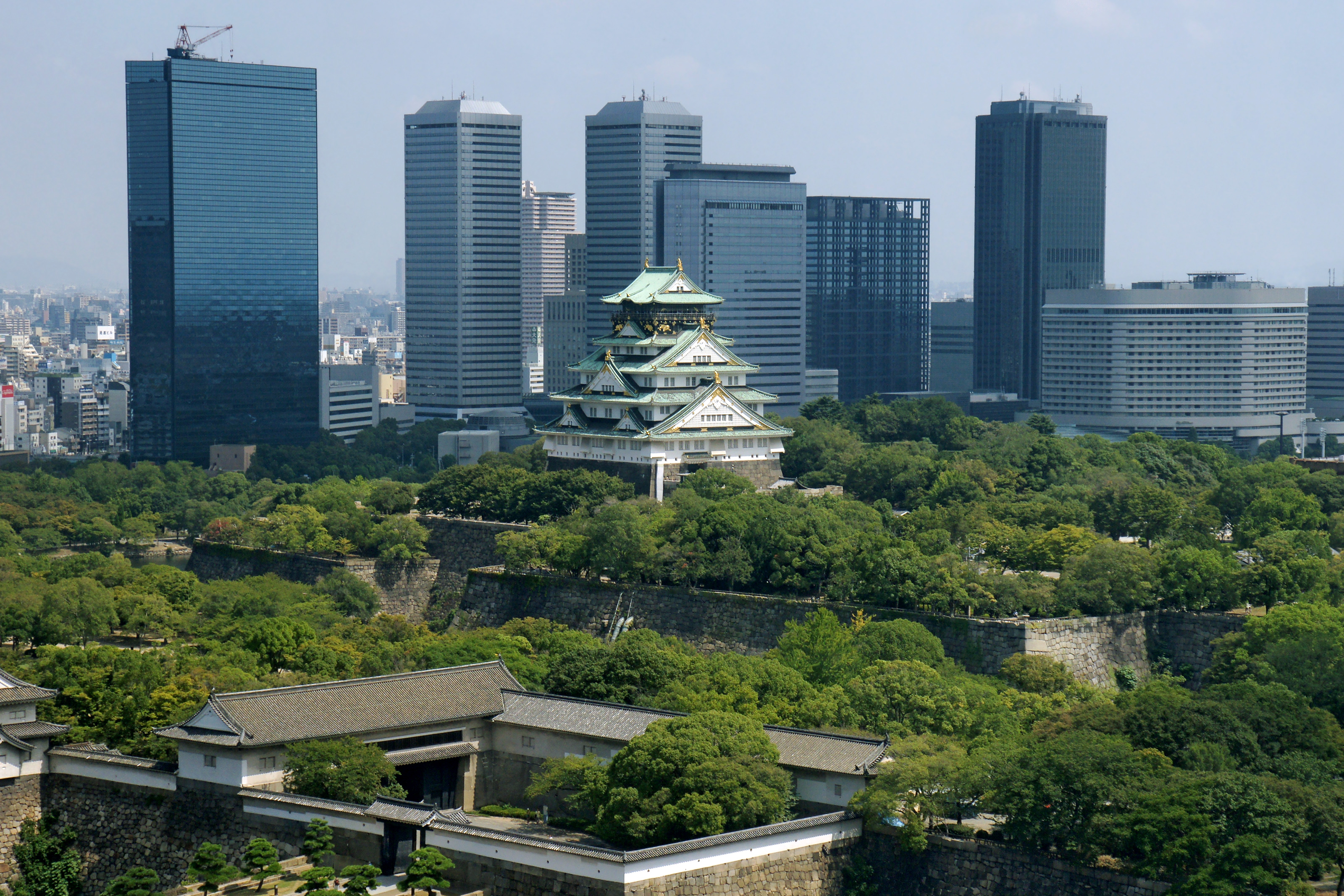
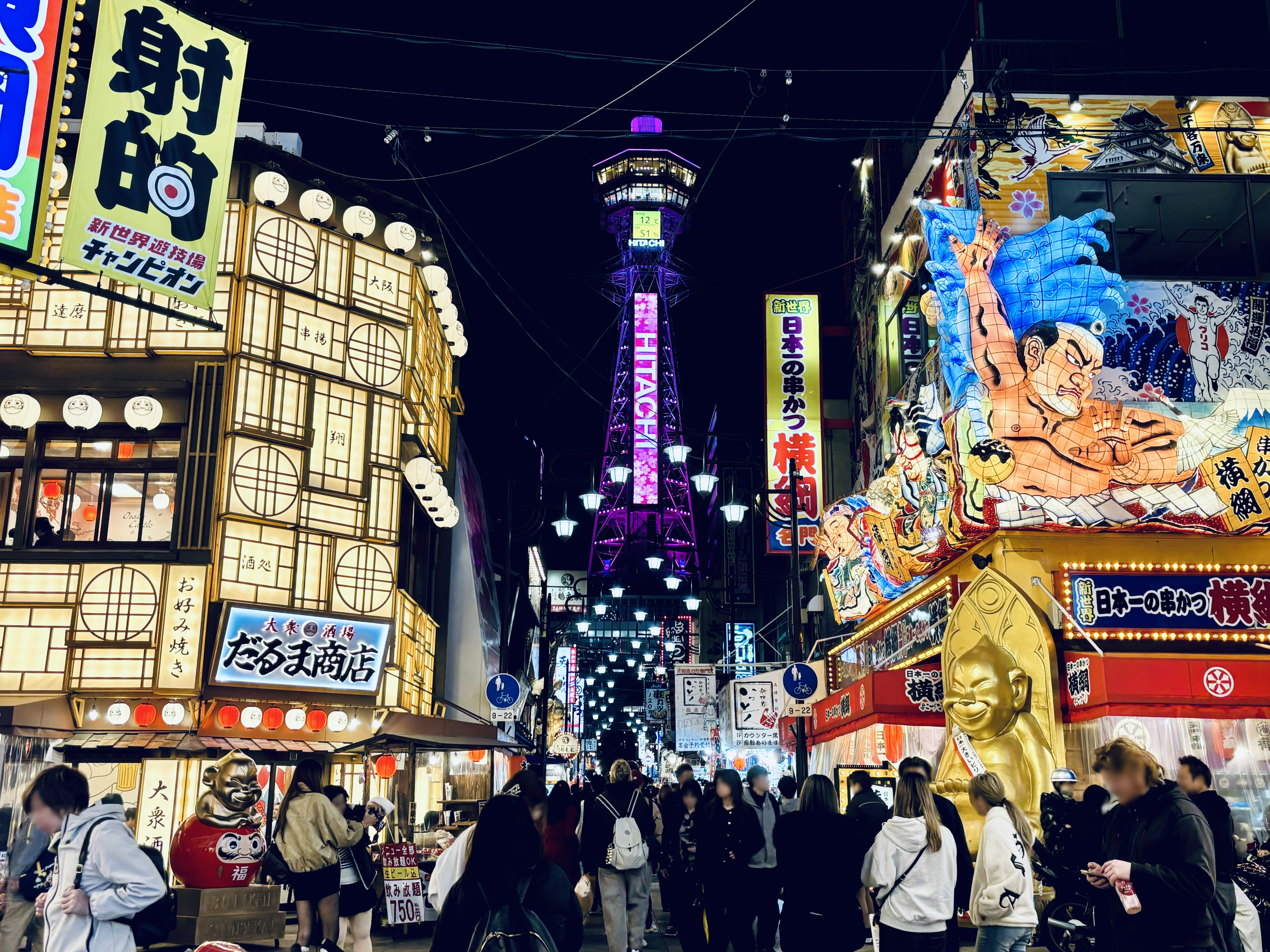
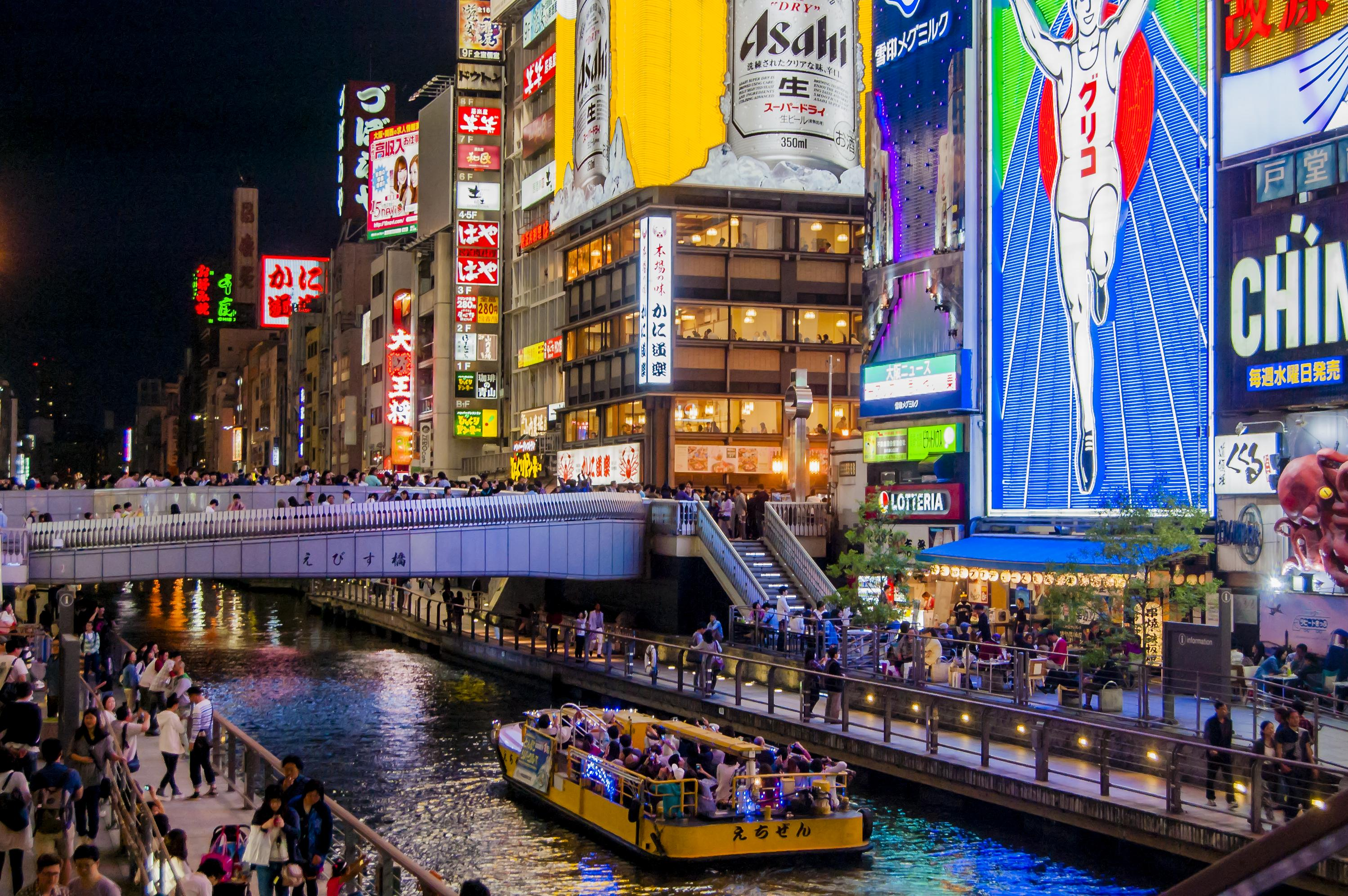
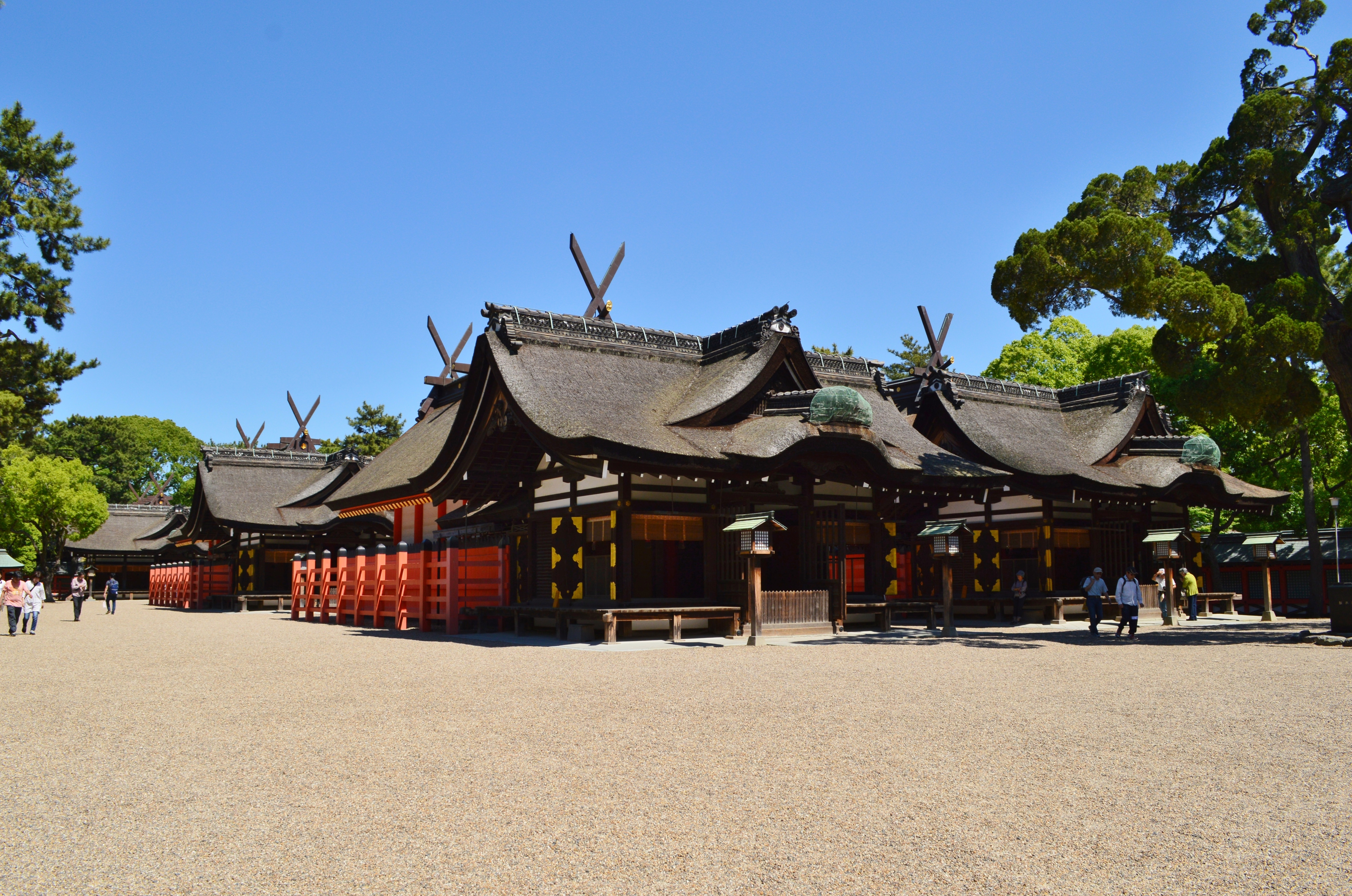
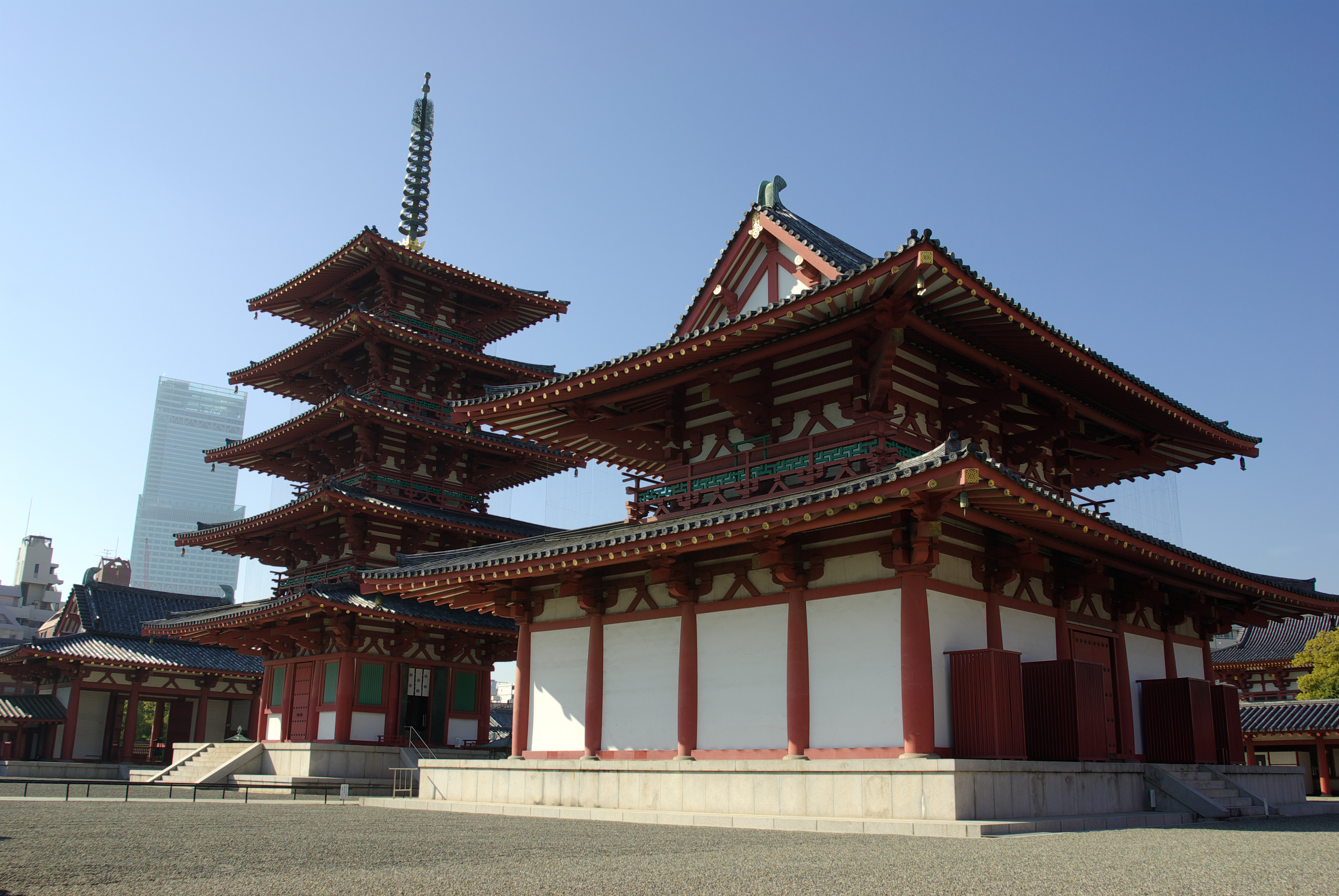
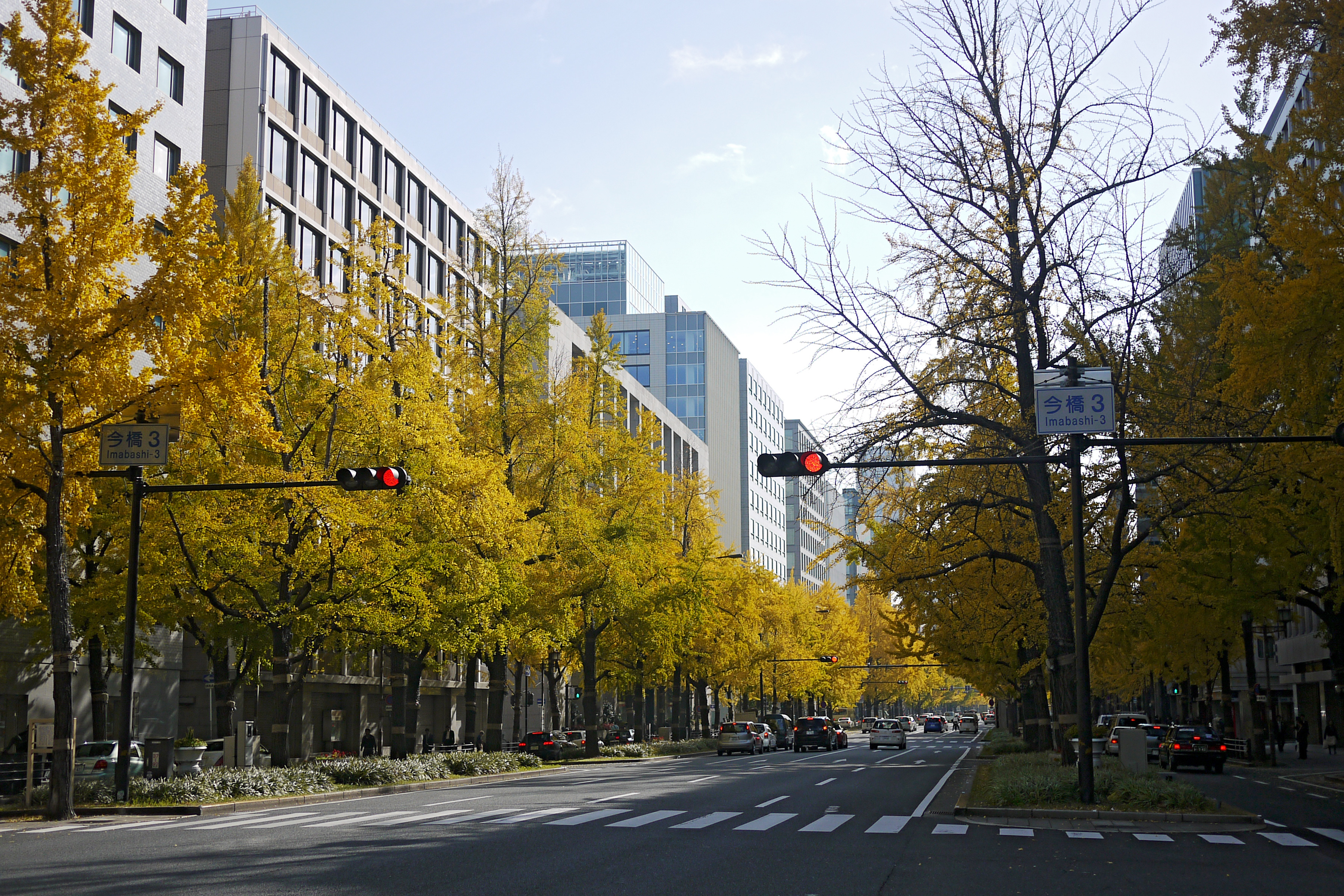
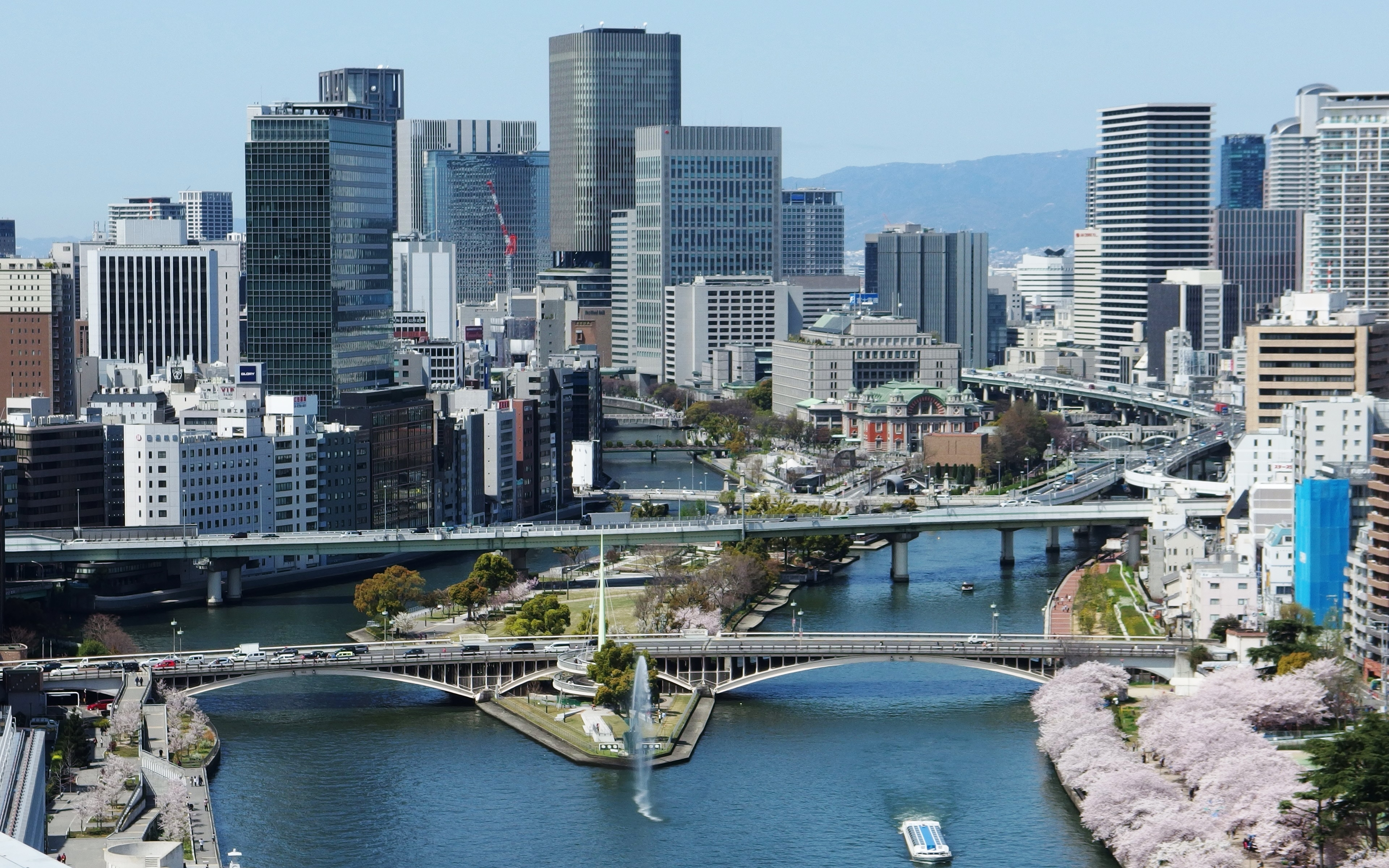
- Osaka Castle and Osaka Business Park Tsūtenkaku tower in Shinsekai Dōtonbori Sumiyoshi Taisha Shitennō-ji Midosuji Nakanoshima

- Flag Emblem

- Location of Osaka in Osaka Prefecture

- Location in the Kansai region Osaka (Kansai region) Osaka (Japan) Osaka (Asia)
- Coordinates: 34°41′38″N 135°30′8″E
- Country: Japan
- Region: Kansai
- Prefecture: Osaka Prefecture
- Island: Honshu

Government
  - Body: Osaka City Council
  - Mayor: Hideyuki Yokoyama (ORA)

Area
  - Prefecture capital and Designated city: 225.21 km^{2} (86.95 sq mi)

Population (Estimated population as of October 1, 2025)
  - Prefecture capital and Designated city: 2,816,247
  - Rank: 3rd in Japan
  - Density: 12,505/km^{2} (32,390/sq mi)
  - Urban: 13,000,000
  - Metro (2015): 19,302,746 (2nd)
- Time zone: UTC+9 (Japan Standard Time)
- Flower: Cherry blossom and Pansy
- Address: Osaka City Hall: 1-3-20 Nakanoshima, Kita-ku, Osaka-shi, Osaka-fu; 530-8201
- Phone number: 06-6208-8181
- Website: city.osaka.lg.jp

Osaka

Japanese name
- Kanji: 大阪; 大坂 (obsolete)
Transcriptions
- Revised Hepburn: Ōsaka
- Kunrei-shiki: Ôsaka

Osaka (大阪市, Ōsaka-shi; [ò̞ó̞.sä́.kä́(.ɕì), ó̞ó̞-]) is a designated city in the Kansai region of Honshu in Japan. It is the capital of and most populous city in Osaka Prefecture, and the third-most populous city proper in Japan, following the special wards of Tokyo and Yokohama. With an estimated population of 2.8 million as of October 1, 2025 and a population density of about 12,505 people per square kilometer, it is the largest component of the Keihanshin metropolitan area, the second-largest metropolitan area in Japan and the 10th-largest urban area in the world with more than 19 million inhabitants.

Osaka was traditionally considered Japan's economic hub. By the Kofun period (300–538) it had developed into an important regional port, and in the seventh and eighth centuries it served briefly as the imperial capital. Osaka continued to flourish during the Edo period (1603–1867) and became known as a center of Japanese culture. Following the Meiji Restoration, it greatly expanded in size and underwent rapid industrialization. This accelerated population growth throughout the following decades, and Osaka was the industrial hub in the Meiji and Taishō eras. It made contributions to redevelopment, urban planning and zoning standards in the postwar period, and developed rapidly as one of the major financial centers in the Keihanshin Metropolitan Area.

Osaka is a major financial center of Japan and is recognized as one of its most multicultural and cosmopolitan cities. It is home to the Osaka Exchange and the headquarters of multinational electronics corporations such as Panasonic and Sharp. Osaka is an international center of research and development and is represented by several major universities, including Osaka University, Osaka Metropolitan University, and Kansai University. Landmarks include Osaka Castle, Osaka Aquarium Kaiyukan, Dōtonbori, Tsūtenkaku in Shinsekai, Tennōji Park, Abeno Harukas, Sumiyoshi Taisha Grand Shrine, and Shitennō-ji, one of the oldest Buddhist temples in Japan.

== Etymology ==
Ōsaka means 'large hill' or 'large slope'. It is unclear when this name gained prominence over Naniwa, but the oldest written evidence for the name dates back to 1496.

By the Edo period, 大坂 (Ōsaka) and 大阪 (Ōsaka) were mixed use, and the writer Hamamatsu Utakuni, in his book Setsuyo Ochiboshu published in 1808, states that the kanji 坂 was abhorred because it means 'returns to the earth,' and thus 阪 was used. The kanji 土 ('earth') is also similar to the word 士 ('knight'), and 反 means 'against,' so 坂 can be understood as 'samurai rebellion'. 阪 became the official name in 1868 after the Meiji Restoration. The older kanji (坂) is still in very limited use, usually only in historical contexts. When used as an abbreviation, the modern kanji 阪 (han) refers to Osaka City or Osaka Prefecture.

== History ==
=== Origins: Jōmon and Yayoi period ===
During the Jōmon period (7,000 BCE), present-day Osaka was mostly submerged, and the Uemachi Plateau (上町台地, Uemachi Daichi) formed a 12 km (7.5 mi) long and 2.5 km (1.6 mi) wide peninsula separating Kawachi Bay from the Seto Inland Sea. It is considered one of the first places where inhabitants of Japan settled, both for the favorable geological conditions, rich in fresh water and lush vegetation, and because its position was defensible against military attack.

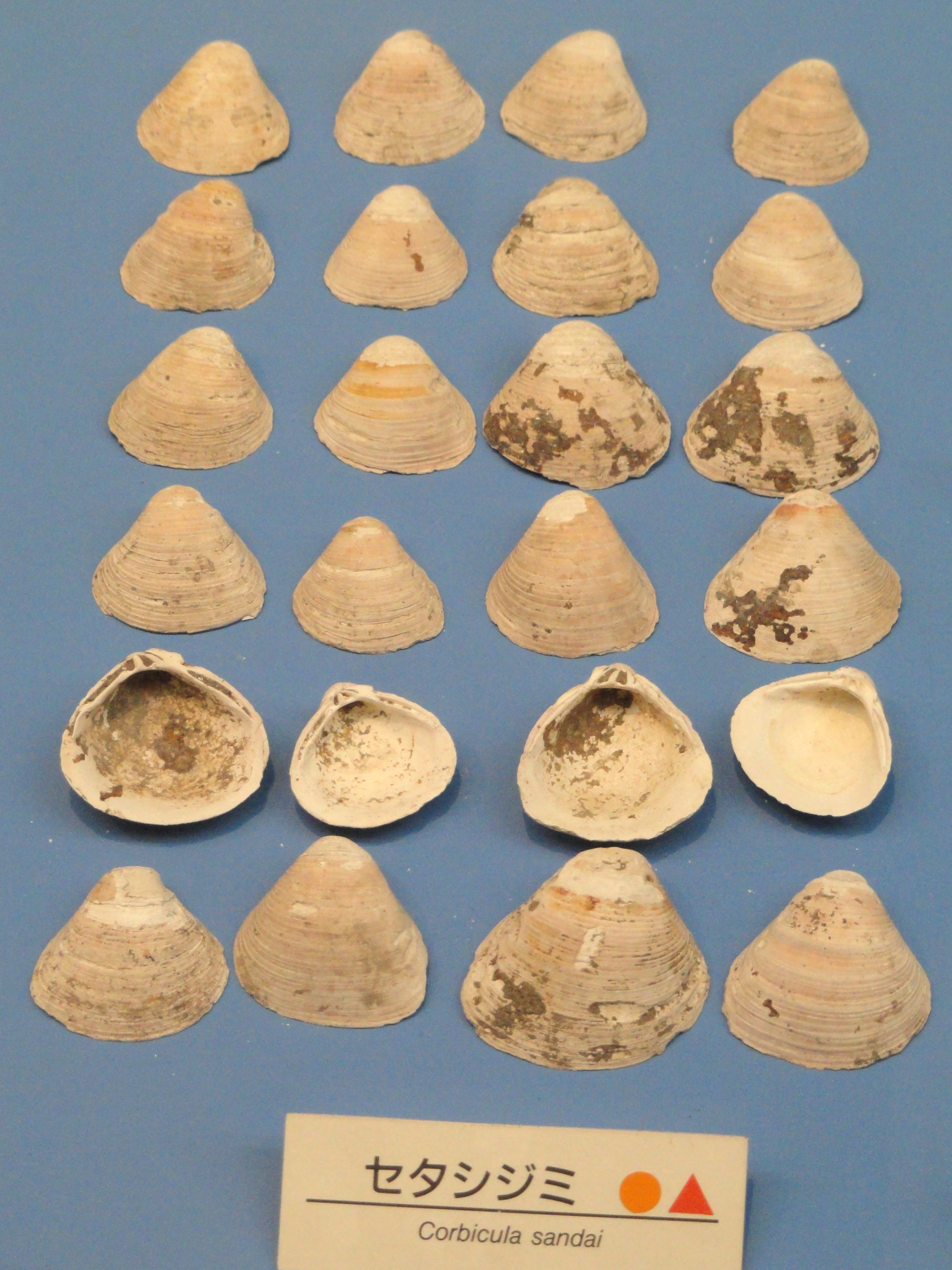
Ancient shells found in the Morinomiya kaizuka (Jomon period)

The earliest evidence of settlements in the Osaka area are the Morinomiya ruins (森ノ宮遺跡, Morinomiya iseki) which is located in the central Chuo-ku district. Buried human skeletons and a kaizuka (a mound containing remains) were found, as well as shell mounds, oysters, and other interesting archeological discoveries from the Jomon period. In addition to the remains of consumed food, there were arrow heads, stone tools, fishing hooks and crockery with remains from rice processing. It is estimated that the ruins contain 2,000-year-old debris between the Jomon and Yayoi period. The findings of the archeological sites are exhibited in an adjacent building.

In the years between the end of the Jōmon period and the beginning of the Yayoi period, the sediments that were deposited north of the Uemachi peninsula / plateau transformed Kawachi Bay into a lagoon. During the Yayoi period (300 BCE – 250 CE), permanent habitation on the plains grew as rice farming became popular.

At the beginning of the third century CE the grand shrine of Sumiyoshi-taisha was inaugurated near the harbor, commissioned by consort Empress Jingū. This Shinto shrine structure survived historical events, which inaugurated a new style in the construction of Shinto shrines, called Sumiyoshi-zukuri. The maritime panorama enjoyed from the shrine gardens inspired several artists, and nowadays the representations of that type of landscape are called Sumiyoshi drawings.

Towards the end of the Yayoi period the Uemachi plateau-peninsula expanded further, transforming the Kawachi Lagoon into a lake (河内湖) connected to the mouth of the Yodo River, which had widened to the south.

=== Kofun period ===
By the Kofun period, Osaka developed into a hub port connecting the region to the western part of Japan. The port of Naniwa-tsu was established and became the most important in Japan. Trade with other areas of the country and the Asian continent intensified. The large numbers of increasingly larger keyhole-shaped Kofun mounds found in the plains of Osaka are evidence of political-power concentration, leading to the formation of a state. The findings in the neighboring plains, including the mausoleum of Emperor Nintoku was discovered nearby in Sakai testify to the status of imperial city that Osaka had reached. Four of these mounds can be seen in Osaka, in which important members of the nobility are buried. They are located in the southern districts of the city and date back to the 5th century. A group of megalithic tombs called Mozu Tombs are located in Sakai, Osaka Prefecture.

Important works of the Kofun period is the excavation that diverted the course of the Yamato River, whose floods caused extensive damage, and the construction of important roads in the direction of Sakai and Nara. Maritime traffic connected to the port of Naniwa-tsu increased in such a way that huge warehouses were built to stow material arriving and departing.

=== Asuka and Nara period ===
The Kojiki records that during 390–430 CE, there was an imperial palace located at Osumi, in what is present day Higashiyodogawa ward, but it may have been a secondary imperial residence rather than a capital.

In 645, Emperor Kōtoku built his Naniwa Nagara-Toyosaki Palace in what is now Osaka, making it the capital of Japan. The city now known as Osaka was at this time referred to as Naniwa (written as 浪華 or 浪花) and this name and derivations of it are still in use for districts in central Osaka such as Naniwa (浪速) and Namba (難波). Although the capital was moved to Asuka (in Nara Prefecture today) in 655, Naniwa remained a vital connection, by land and sea, between Yamato (modern day Nara Prefecture), Korea, and China.

Naniwa was declared the capital again in 744 by order of Emperor Shōmu, and remained so until 745, when the Imperial Court moved back to Heijō-kyō (now Nara). By the end of the Nara period, Naniwa's seaport roles had been gradually taken over by neighboring areas, but it remained a lively center of river, channel, and land transportation between Heian-kyō (Kyoto today) and other destinations. Sumiyoshi Taisha Grand Shrine was founded by Tamomi no Sukune in 211 CE. Shitennō-ji was first built in 593 CE and is the oldest Buddhist temple in Japan.

Gallery

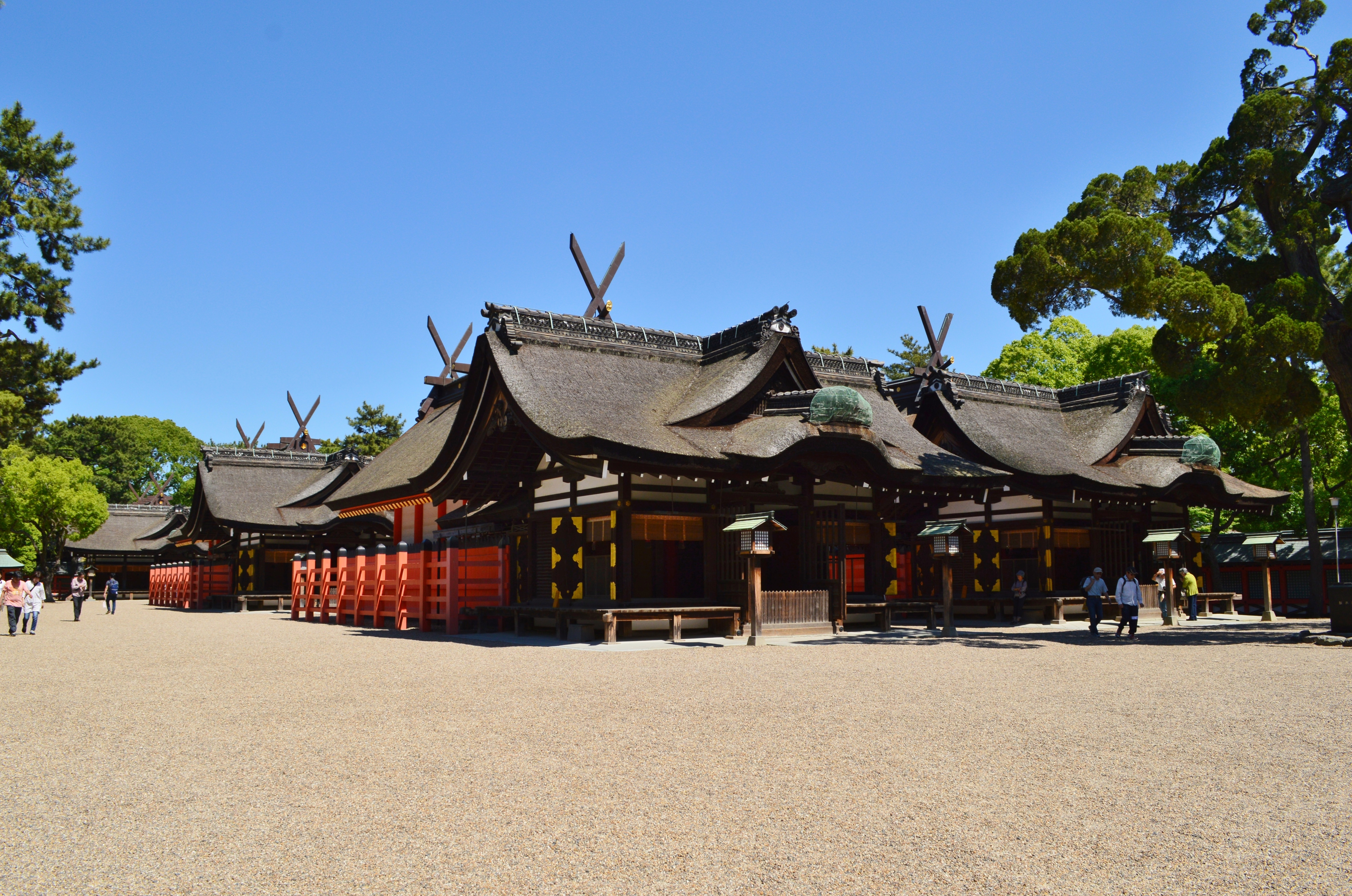
Sumiyoshi Taisha Grand Shrine

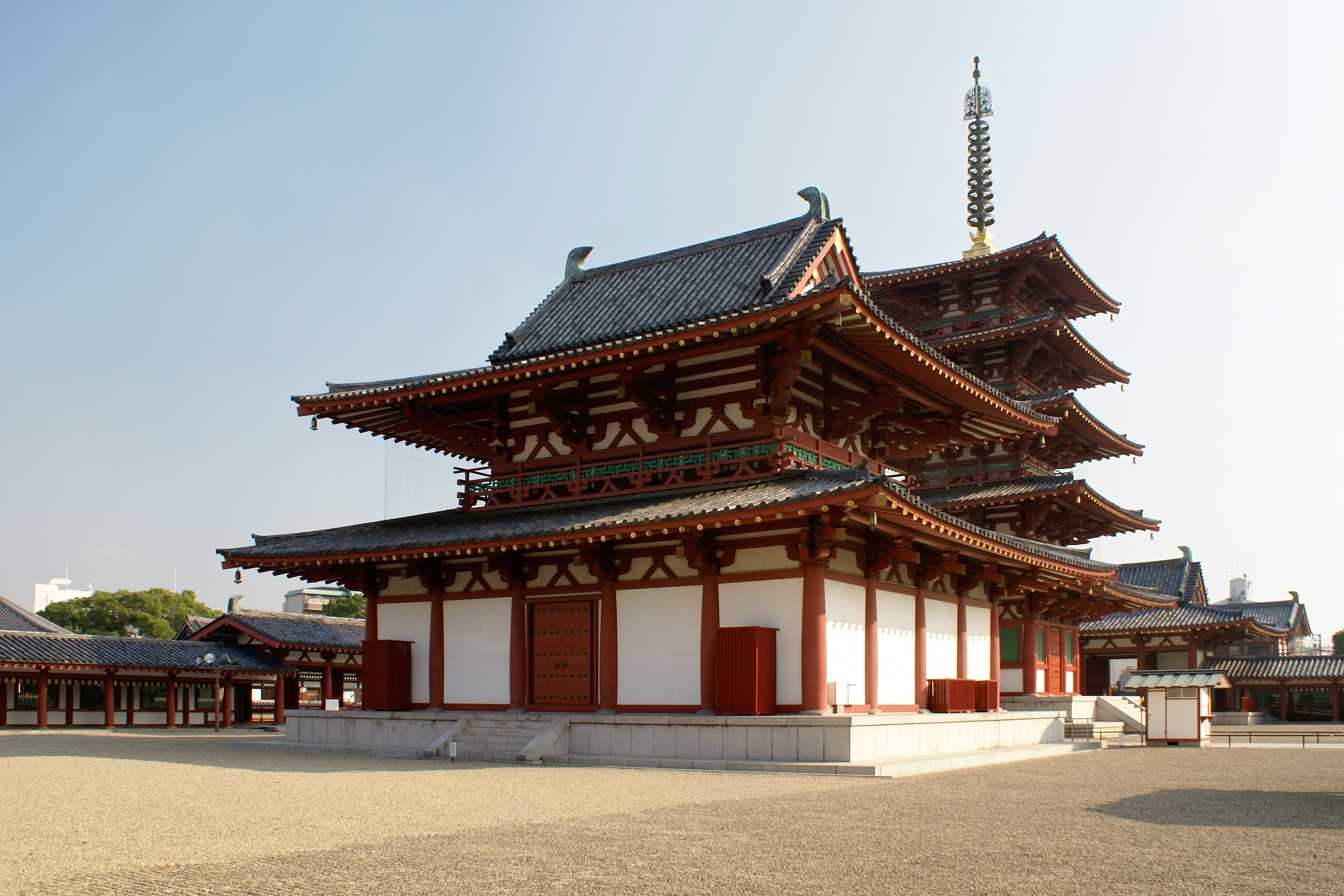
Shitennō-ji

Remains of Naniwa-no-Miya Palace

=== Heian to Edo period ===
In 1496, Jōdo Shinshū Buddhists established their headquarters in the heavily fortified Ishiyama Hongan-ji, located directly on the site of the old Naniwa Imperial Palace. Oda Nobunaga began a decade-long siege campaign on the temple in 1570 which ultimately resulted in the surrender of the monks and subsequent razing of the temple. Toyotomi Hideyoshi constructed Osaka Castle in its place in 1583. Osaka Castle played a pivotal role in the Siege of Osaka (1614–1615).

Osaka was long considered Japan's primary economic center, with a large percentage of the population belonging to the merchant class (see Four divisions of society). Over the course of the Edo period (1603–1867), Osaka grew into one of Japan's major cities and returned to its ancient role as a lively and important port. Daimyōs (feudal lords) received most of their income in the form of rice. Merchants in Osaka thus began to organize storehouses where they would store a daimyō's rice in exchange for a fee, trading it for either coin or a form of receipt; essentially a precursor to paper money. Many if not all of these rice brokers also made loans, and would actually become quite wealthy and powerful. Osaka merchants coalesced their shops around Dōjima, where the Rice Exchange was established in 1697 and where the world's first futures market would come to exist to sell rice that was not yet harvested.

The popular culture of Osaka was closely related to ukiyo-e depictions of life in Edo. By 1780, Osaka had cultivated a vibrant arts culture, as typified by its famous Kabuki and Bunraku theaters. In 1837, Ōshio Heihachirō, a low-ranking samurai, led a peasant insurrection in response to the city's unwillingness to support the many poor and suffering families in the area. Approximately one-quarter of the city was razed before shogunal officials put down the rebellion, after which Ōshio killed himself. Osaka was opened to foreign trade by the government of the Bakufu at the same time as Hyogo Town (modern Kobe) on January 1, 1868, just before the advent of the Boshin War and the Meiji Restoration. The Kawaguchi foreign settlement, now the Kawaguchi subdistrict, is a legacy of the foreign presence in Osaka.

Osaka residents were stereotyped in Edo literature from at least the 18th century. Jippensha Ikku in 1802 depicted Osakans as stingy almost beyond belief. In 1809, the derogatory term "Kamigata zeeroku" was used by Edo residents to characterize inhabitants of the Osaka region in terms of calculation, shrewdness, lack of civic spirit, and the vulgarity of Osaka dialect. Edo writers aspired to samurai culture, and saw themselves as poor but generous, chaste, and public spirited. Edo writers by contrast saw "zeeroku" as obsequious apprentices, stingy, greedy, gluttonous, and lewd. To some degree, Osaka residents are still stigmatized by Tokyo observers in the same way today, especially in terms of gluttony, evidenced in the phrase, "Residents of Osaka devour their food until they collapse" (大阪は食倒れ, "Ōsaka wa kuidaore").

Gallery

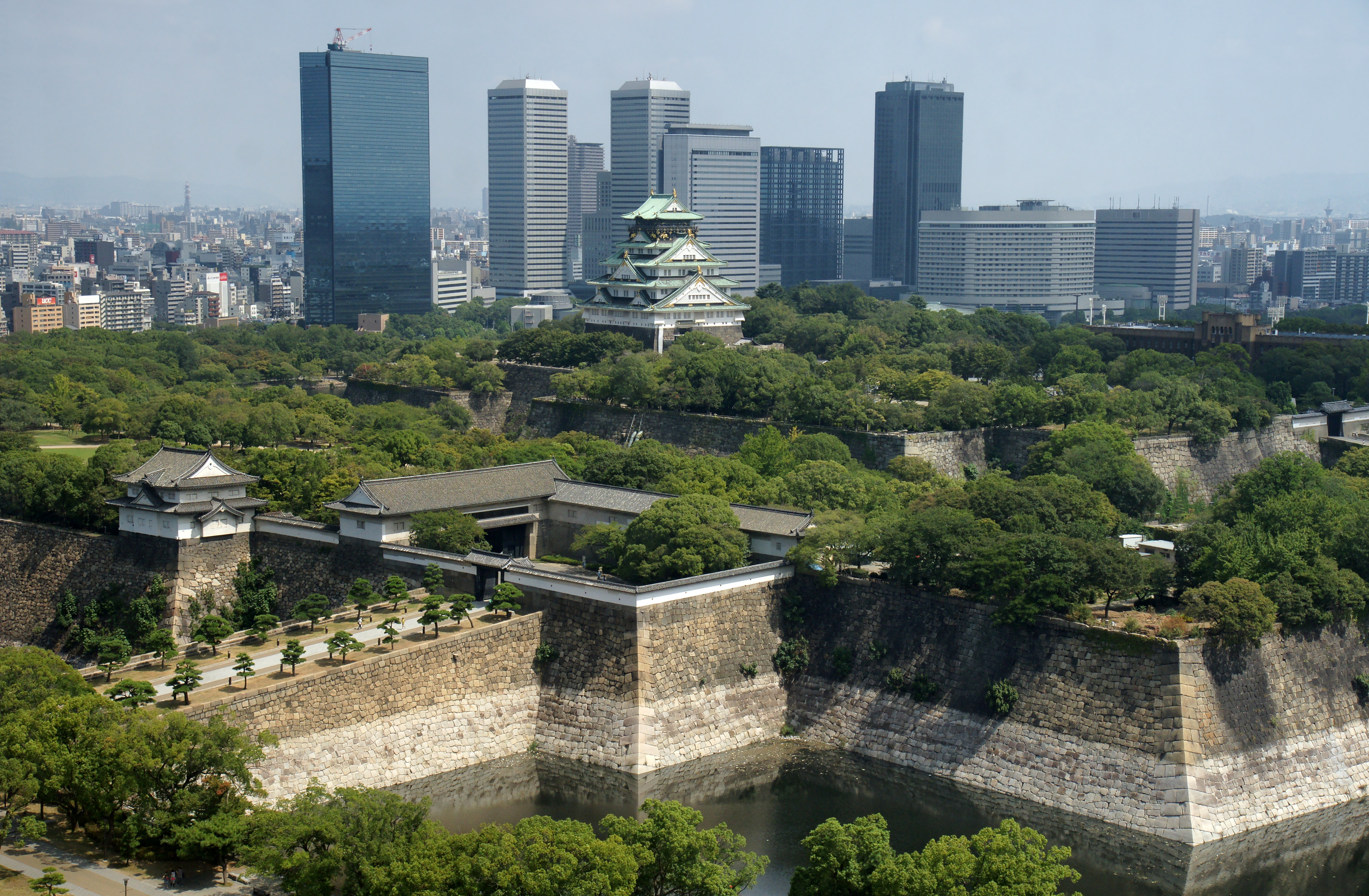
Osaka Castle, first built in 1583

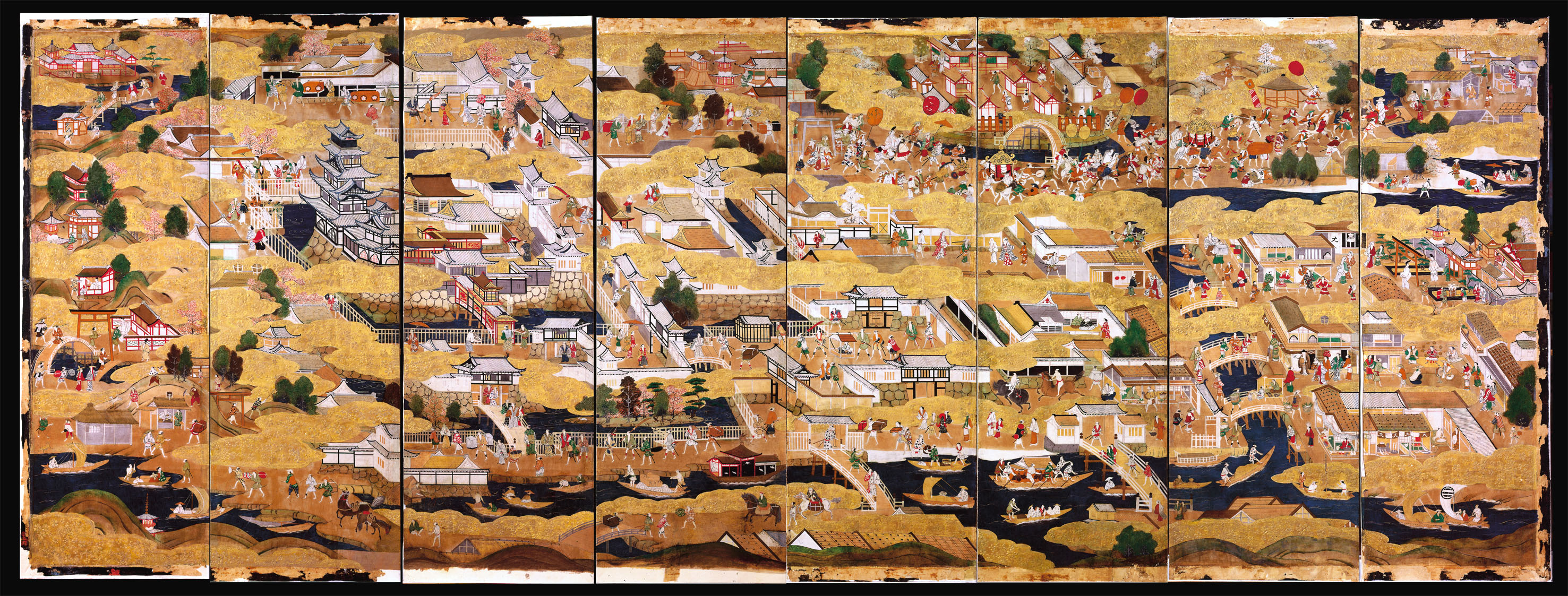
The Sumiyoshi-matsuri in the 16th century

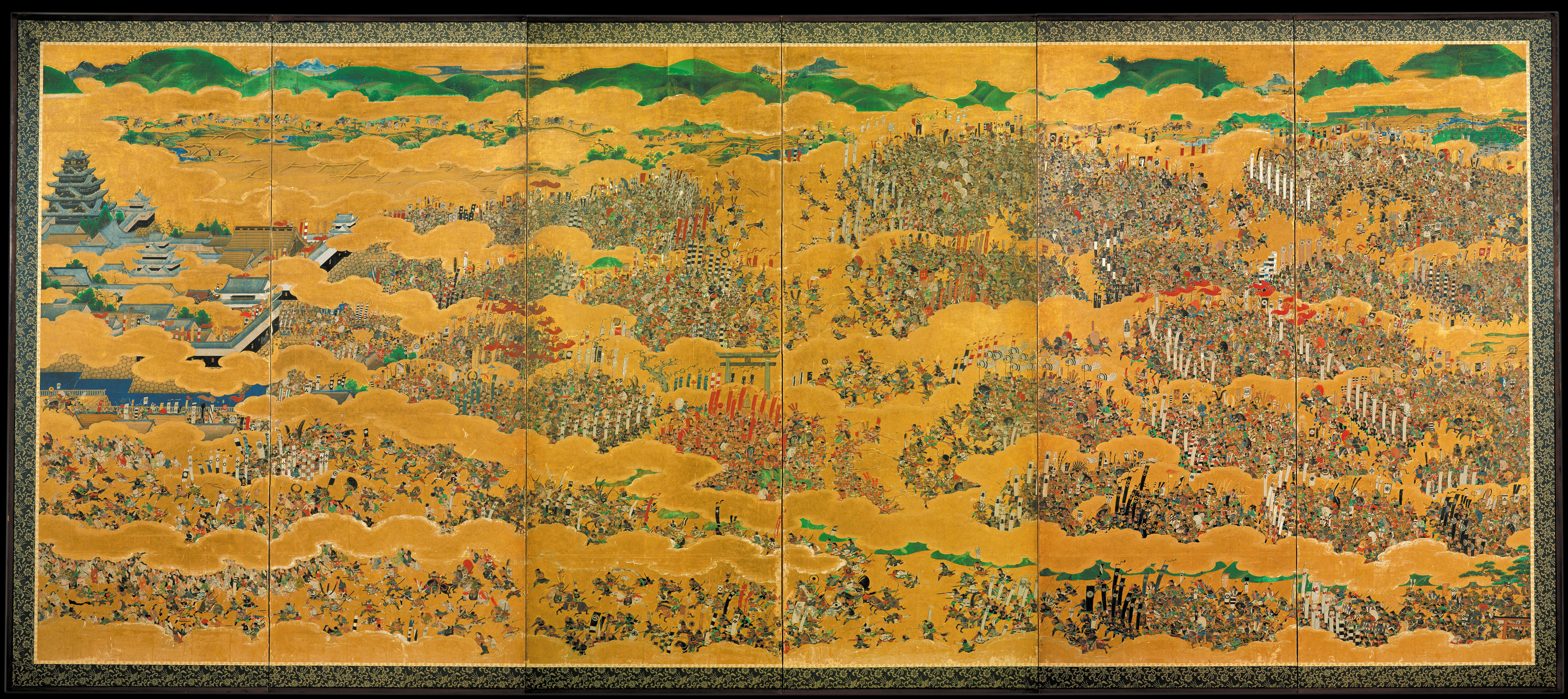
Japanese painting of the Siege of Osaka, 1615

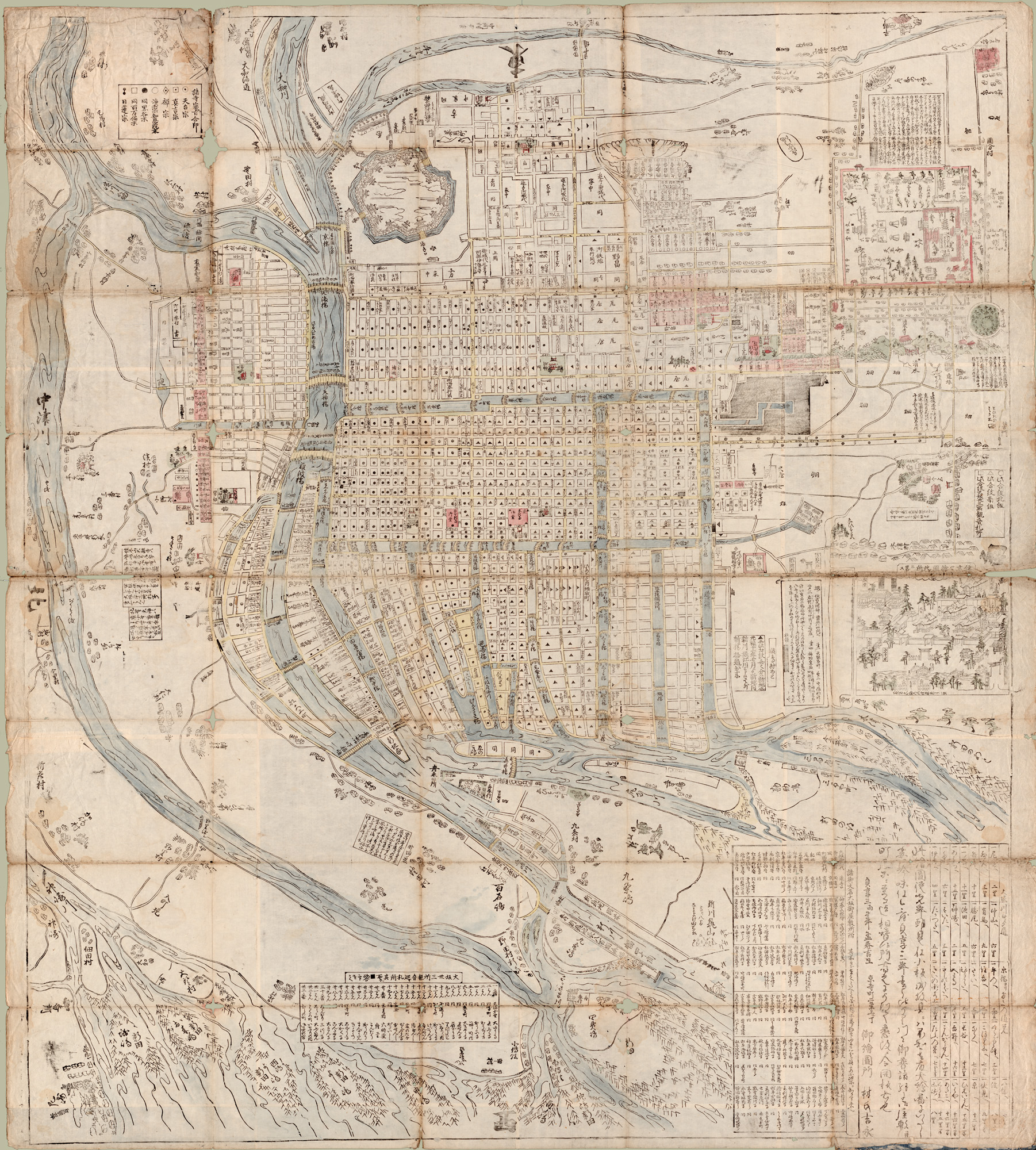
A 1686 map of Osaka

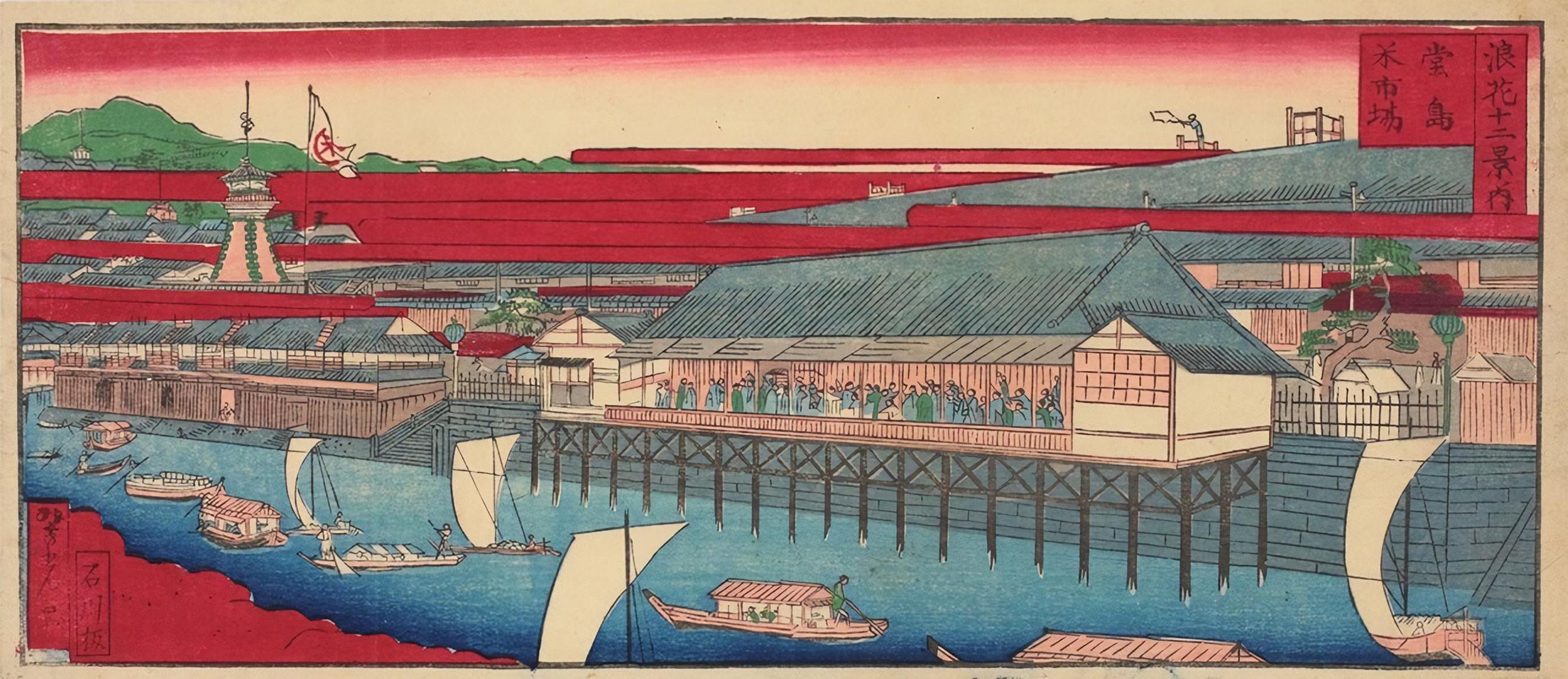
Dōjima Rice Exchange ukiyo-e by Yoshimitsu Sasaki

=== Meiji to Heisei period ===
With the enormous changes that characterized the country after the Meiji Restoration (1868), and the relocation of the capital from Kyoto to Tokyo, Osaka entered a period of decline. From being the capital of the economy and finance, it became a predominantly industrial center. The modern municipality was established in 1889 by government ordinance, with an initial area of 15 square kilometers (6 sq mi), overlapping today's Chuo and Nishi wards. Later, the city went through three major expansions to reach its current size of 223 square kilometers (86 sq mi). Osaka was the industrial center most clearly defined in the development of capitalism in Japan. It became known as the "Manchester and Melbourne of the Orient". In 1925, it was the largest and most populous city in Japan and the sixth largest in the world.

The rapid industrialization attracted many Asian immigrants (Indians, Chinese, and Koreans), who set up a life apart for themselves. The political system was pluralistic, with a strong emphasis on promoting industrialization and modernization. Literacy was high and the educational system expanded rapidly, producing a middle class with a taste for literature and a willingness to support the arts. In 1927, General Motors operated a factory called Osaka Assembly until 1941, manufacturing Chevrolet, Cadillac, Pontiac, Oldsmobile, and Buick vehicles, operated and staffed by Japanese workers and managers. In the nearby city of Ikeda in Osaka Prefecture is the headquarters of Daihatsu, one of Japan's oldest automobile manufacturers.

Like its European and American counterparts, Osaka displayed slums, unemployment, and poverty. In Japan it was here that municipal government first introduced a comprehensive system of poverty relief, copied in part from British models. Osaka policymakers stressed the importance of family formation and mutual assistance as the best way to combat poverty. This minimized the cost of welfare programs.

During World War II, Osaka came under air raids in 1945 by the United States Army Air Forces as part of the air raids on Japan. On March 13, 1945, a total of 329 Boeing B-29 Superfortress heavy bombers took part in the raid against Osaka. According to an American prisoner of war who was held in the city, the air raid took almost the entire night and destroyed 25 square miles (65 km^{2}) of the city. The U.S. bombed the city again twice in June 1945 and again on August 14, a day before Japan's surrender.

In the decades following World War II, Osaka's reconstruction efforts and the industriousness of its residents brought the city even greater prosperity than before the war. Its population surpassed three million in the 1960s, initiating large-scale suburbanization within the prefecture, and eventually doubled to six million by the 1990s. With factories rebuilt and trade revived, Osaka rapidly developed into a major multicultural and financial center from the 1950s through the 1980s. Osaka Prefecture was chosen as the venue for the prestigious Expo '70, the first world's fair ever held in an Asian country. Since then, numerous international events have been held in Osaka, including the 1995 APEC Summit.

The modern municipality, which when it was established in 1889 occupied an area of just 15 km^{2} (5.8 sq mi) including the districts of Chūō and Nishi, following three successive expansions has reached an area of 222 km^{2} (86 sq mi). It was one of the first cities in Japan to obtain designated city status in 1956.

=== 21st century to present ===
The plan to reorganize Osaka and its province into a metropolis like Tokyo was met with stiff opposition in some municipalities, particularly the highly populated Sakai. Tōru Hashimoto then fell back on a project that included the suppression of the 24 wards of Osaka, thus dividing the city into 5 new special districts with a status similar to that of the 23 Special wards of Tokyo. It was introduced by former mayor Tōru Hashimoto, leader of the reform party Osaka Restoration Association which he founded. The May 2015 referendum for the approval of this project saw the narrow victory of no, and consequently Hashimoto announced his withdrawal from politics. A second referendum for a merger into 4 semi-autonomous wards was narrowly voted down by 692,996 (50.6%).

According to the Forbes list of The World's Most Expensive Places To Live 2009, Osaka was the second most expensive in the world after Tokyo. By 2020 it slipped to the 5th rank of most expensive cities.

In March 2014, the 300-meter (980 ft) tall Abeno Harukas opened, which became the tallest building in Japan (surpassing the Yokohama Landmark Tower in Yokohama), until it was in turn surpassed by the 330-meter (1,080 ft) tall Azabudai Hills Main Tower in Tokyo following its completion in 2022.

Expo 2025 was held at Yumeshima Island, Konohana-ku from April to October 2025. Osaka is the third city to host the World Expo twice, previously hosting Expo '70. It is also the fourth World's Fair held in Japan following Expo '90 and Expo 2005 in Aichi Prefecture. With Expo 2025, the event returned to its traditional 5-year scheduling cycle after the Expo 2020 in Dubai was delayed to 2021 due to the COVID-19 pandemic. The projected visitor count is approximately 28 million.

On same site where Expo 2025 was held, MGM Resorts began construction on MGM Osaka in April 2025. MGM Osaka will be the first integrated resort in Japan. It will include 2,300 hotel rooms, a casino, shopping and dining options, convention space and a 3,500-seat theatre.

Gallery

Osaka Japan from Kuchu Teien (Floating Garden) atop Umeda Sky building.

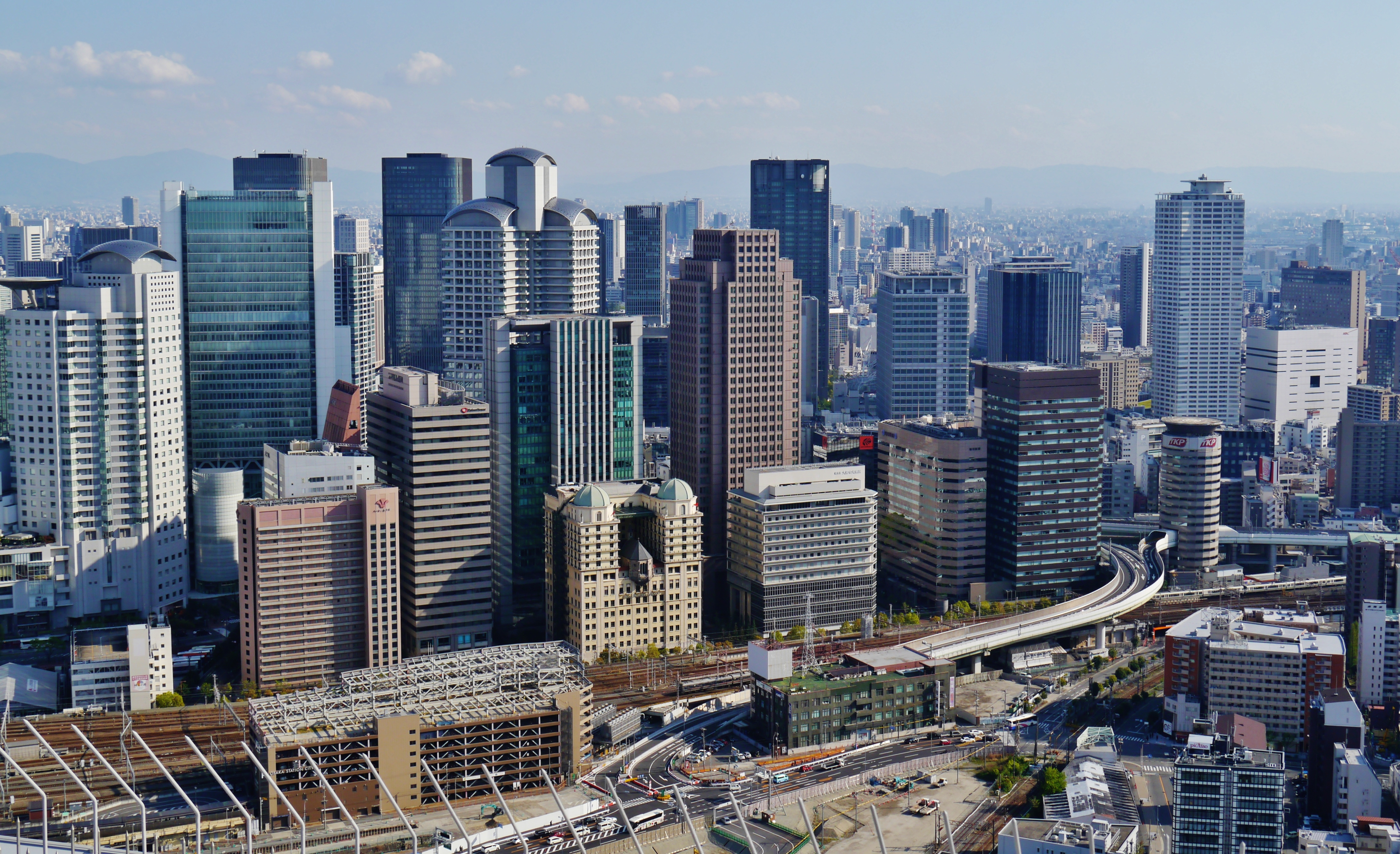
Skyscrapers in the Umeda district

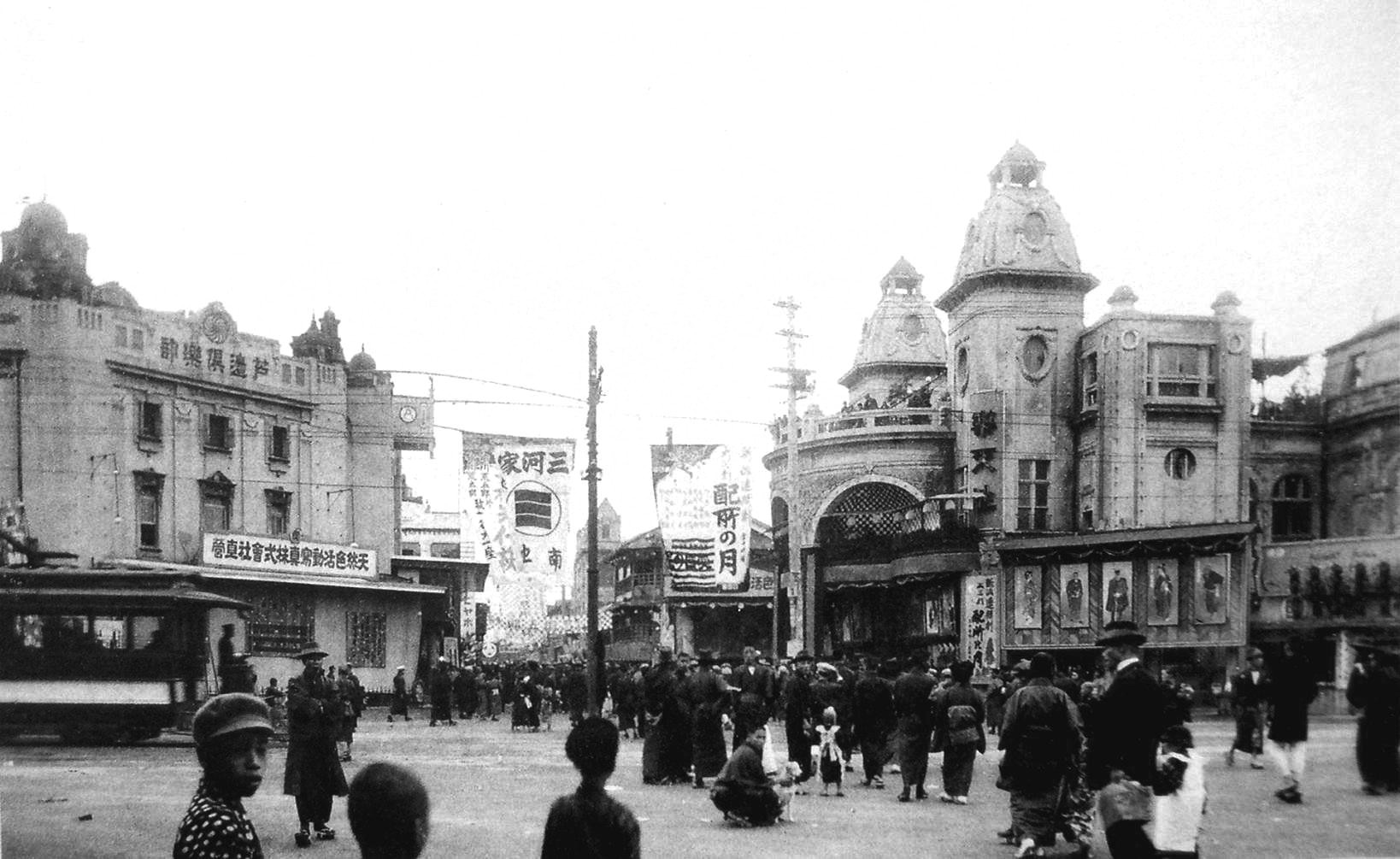
The Sennichimae area in 1916

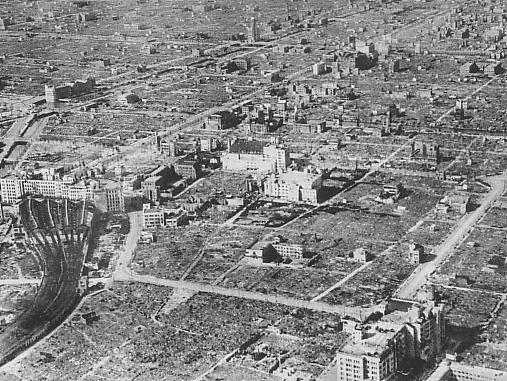
Osaka after the bombing in 1945

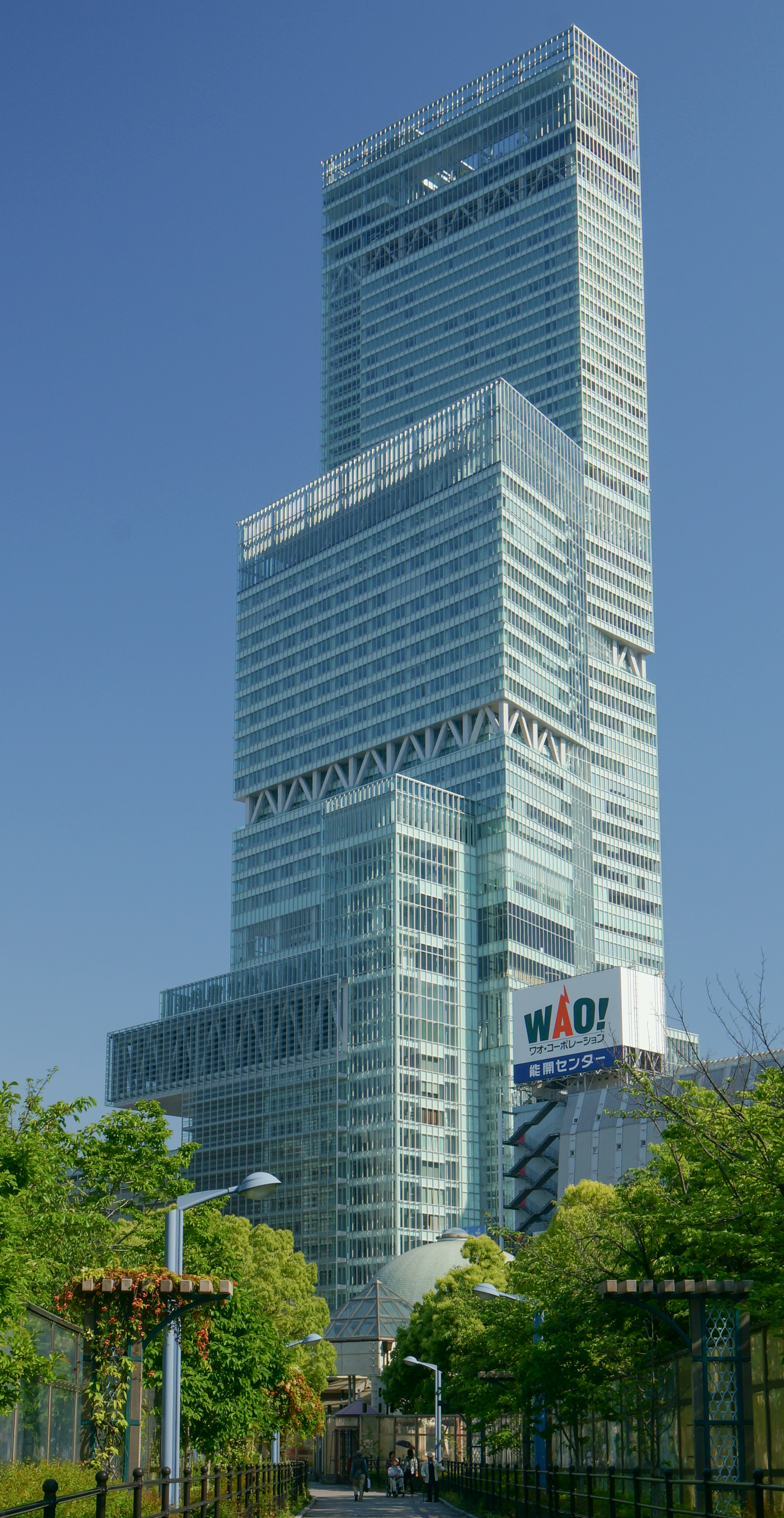
Abeno Harukas, the second-tallest building in Japan

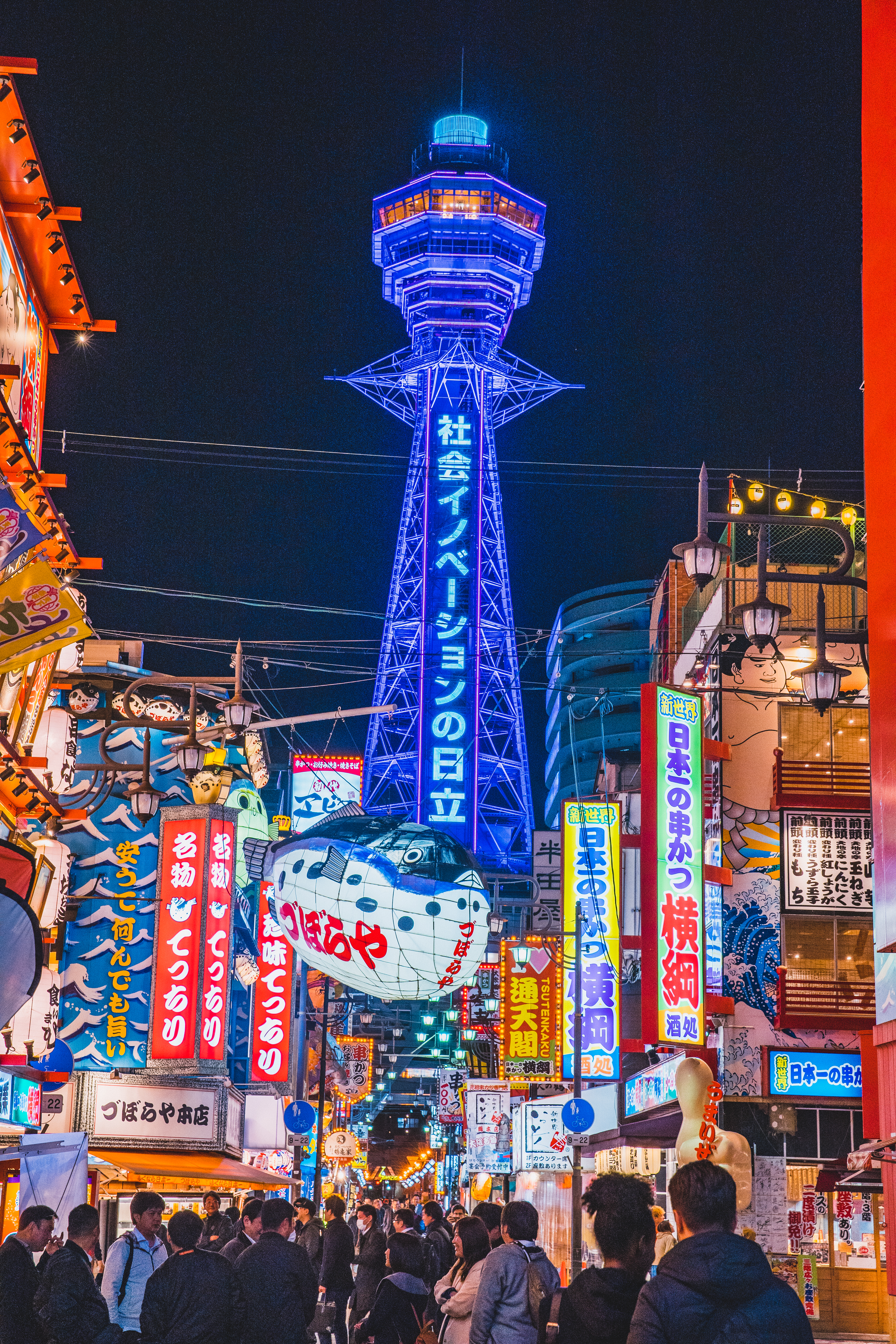
Shinsekai

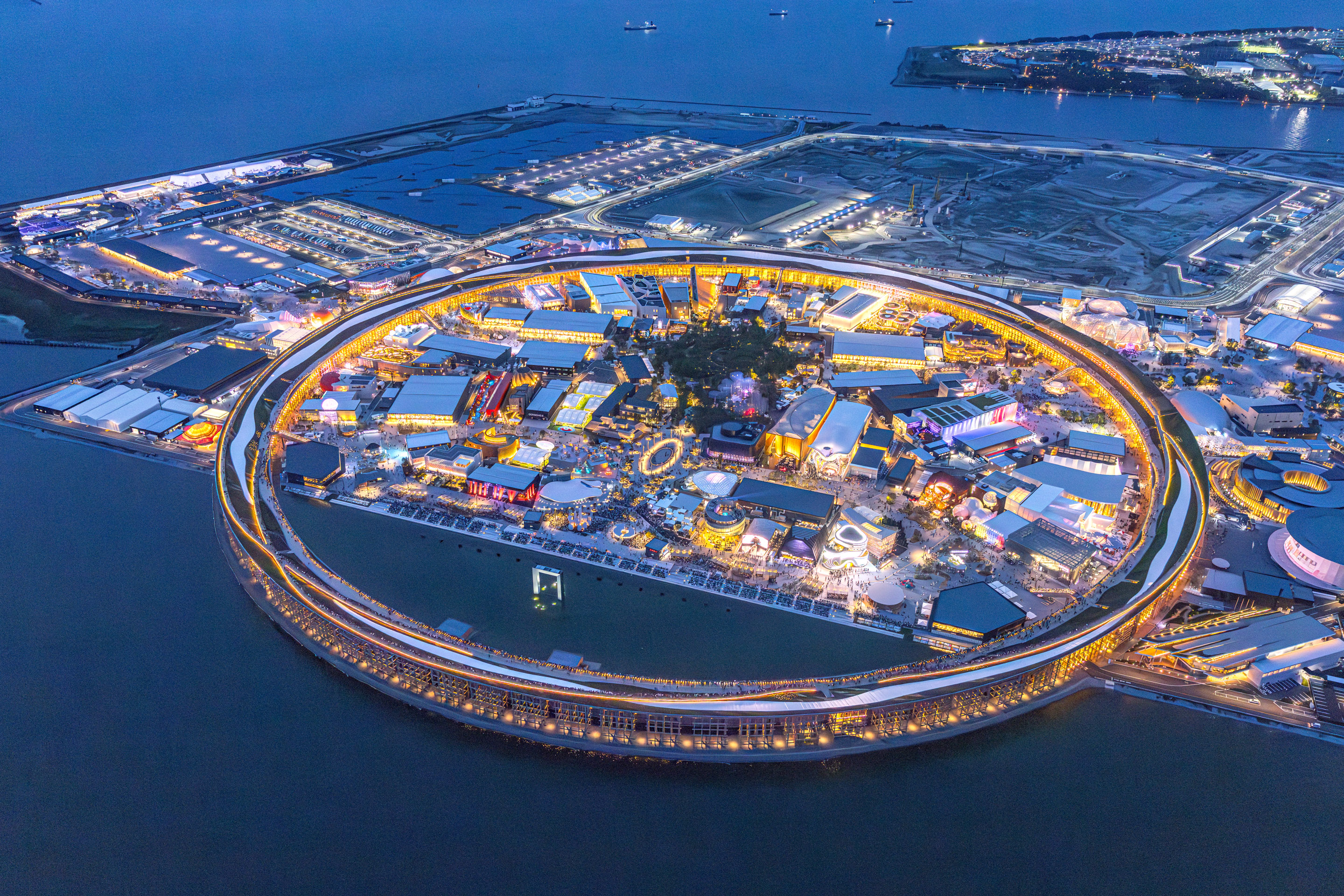
The Grand Ring at the Expo 2025

== Geography ==
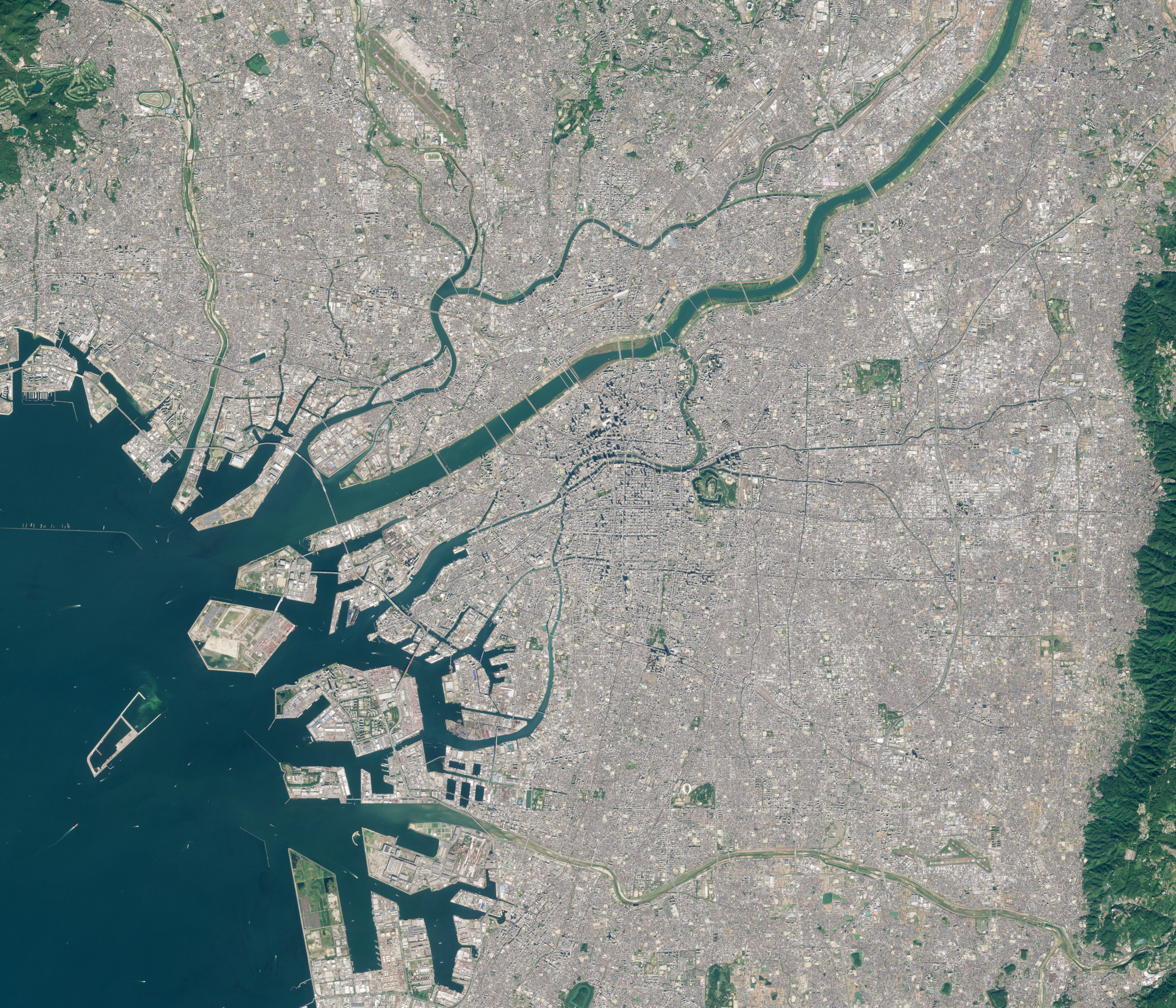
A satellite image of Osaka

Osaka's west side is open to Osaka Bay, and is otherwise completely surrounded by more than ten satellite cities, all of them in Osaka Prefecture, with one exception: the city of Amagasaki, belonging to Hyōgo Prefecture, in the northwest. The city occupies a larger area (about 13%) than any other city or village within Osaka Prefecture.

When Osaka was established in 1889, it occupied roughly the area known today as the Chuo and Nishi wards, 15.27 square kilometers (6 mi^{2}) that grew into today's 222.30 square kilometers (86 mi^{2}) via incremental expansions. The largest was a single 126.01-square-kilometer (49 mi^{2}) expansion in 1925. Osaka's highest point, located in Tsurumi-ku, is 37.5 meters (123.0 ft) above Tokyo Peil. The lowest point, in Nishiyodogawa-ku, is −2.2 meters (−7.2 ft) below Tokyo Peil. Osaka is situated at a latitude of 34.67°, near the 35th parallel north, a latitude farther south than Rome (41.90°), Madrid (40.41°), San Francisco (37.77°) and Seoul (37.53°).

=== Climate ===
Osaka is located in the humid subtropical climate zone (Köppen Cfa), with four distinct seasons. Its winters are generally mild. January is the coldest month, with an average high of 9.7 °C (49 °F). Osaka rarely sees snowfall during the winter. Spring in Osaka starts off mild, but ends up being hot and humid. Spring tends to be Osaka's wettest season, with the tsuyu (梅雨, tsuyu; "plum rain")—the rainy season—occurring between early June and late July. The average starting and ending dates of the rainy season are June 7 and July 21 respectively.

Summers are very hot and humid. In August, the hottest month, the average daily high temperature reaches 33.7 °C (93 °F). Average nighttime low temperatures typically hover around 25.8 °C (78 °F). Fall in Osaka sees a cooling trend, with the early part of the season resembling summer, while the latter part of fall resembles winter.

Precipitation is abundant. Winter is the driest season. Monthly rainfall peaks in June with the "tsuyu" rainy season, which typically ends in mid to late July. From late July to late August, summer's heat and humidity peak, and rainfall decreases somewhat. Osaka has a second rainy period in September and early October, when tropical weather systems, including typhoons, coming from the south or southwest are possible.

Climate data for Osaka (1991–2020 normals, extremes 1883–present)
Month	Jan	Feb	Mar	Apr	May	Jun	Jul	Aug	Sep	Oct	Nov	Dec	Year
Record high °C (°F)	19.1 (66.4)	23.7 (74.7)	26.1 (79.0)	30.7 (87.3)	32.7 (90.9)	36.1 (97.0)	38.7 (101.7)	39.1 (102.4)	36.5 (97.7)	33.1 (91.6)	27.9 (82.2)	24.5 (76.1)	39.1 (102.4)
Mean maximum °C (°F)	14.4 (57.9)	17.1 (62.8)	21.4 (70.5)	26.5 (79.7)	30.2 (86.4)	32.8 (91.0)	36.0 (96.8)	36.9 (98.4)	34.1 (93.4)	29.5 (85.1)	23.1 (73.6)	18.0 (64.4)	37.1 (98.8)
Mean daily maximum °C (°F)	9.7 (49.5)	10.5 (50.9)	14.2 (57.6)	19.9 (67.8)	24.9 (76.8)	28.0 (82.4)	31.8 (89.2)	33.7 (92.7)	29.5 (85.1)	23.7 (74.7)	17.8 (64.0)	12.3 (54.1)	21.3 (70.3)
Daily mean °C (°F)	6.2 (43.2)	6.6 (43.9)	9.9 (49.8)	15.2 (59.4)	20.1 (68.2)	23.6 (74.5)	27.7 (81.9)	29.0 (84.2)	25.2 (77.4)	19.5 (67.1)	13.8 (56.8)	8.7 (47.7)	17.1 (62.8)
Mean daily minimum °C (°F)	3.0 (37.4)	3.2 (37.8)	6.0 (42.8)	10.9 (51.6)	16.0 (60.8)	20.3 (68.5)	24.6 (76.3)	25.8 (78.4)	21.9 (71.4)	16.0 (60.8)	10.2 (50.4)	5.3 (41.5)	13.6 (56.5)
Mean minimum °C (°F)	−0.7 (30.7)	−0.5 (31.1)	1.3 (34.3)	4.8 (40.6)	10.8 (51.4)	16.2 (61.2)	20.6 (69.1)	21.9 (71.4)	16.8 (62.2)	10.5 (50.9)	5.1 (41.2)	1.0 (33.8)	−1.0 (30.2)
Record low °C (°F)	−7.5 (18.5)	−6.5 (20.3)	−5.2 (22.6)	−2.6 (27.3)	3.5 (38.3)	8.9 (48.0)	14.8 (58.6)	13.6 (56.5)	10.4 (50.7)	3.0 (37.4)	−2.2 (28.0)	−4.5 (23.9)	−7.5 (18.5)
Average precipitation mm (inches)	47.0 (1.85)	60.5 (2.38)	103.1 (4.06)	101.9 (4.01)	136.5 (5.37)	185.1 (7.29)	174.4 (6.87)	113.0 (4.45)	152.8 (6.02)	136.0 (5.35)	72.5 (2.85)	55.5 (2.19)	1,338.3 (52.69)
Average snowfall cm (inches)	0 (0)	1 (0.4)	0 (0)	0 (0)	0 (0)	0 (0)	0 (0)	0 (0)	0 (0)	0 (0)	0 (0)	0 (0)	1 (0.4)
Average precipitation days (≥ 0.5 mm)	6.4	7.3	10.3	10.0	10.4	12.3	11.3	7.8	10.6	9.2	7.0	7.1	109.7
Average relative humidity (%)	61	60	59	58	61	68	70	66	67	65	64	62	63
Mean monthly sunshine hours	146.5	140.6	172.2	192.6	203.7	154.3	184.0	222.4	161.6	166.1	152.6	152.1	2,048.6
Average ultraviolet index	3	4	6	8	9	10	11	10	8	6	3	2	7
Source: Japan Meteorological Agency and Weather Atlas

== Cityscape ==
Osaka's sprawling cityscape has been described as "only surpassed by Tokyo as a showcase of the Japanese urban phenomenon".

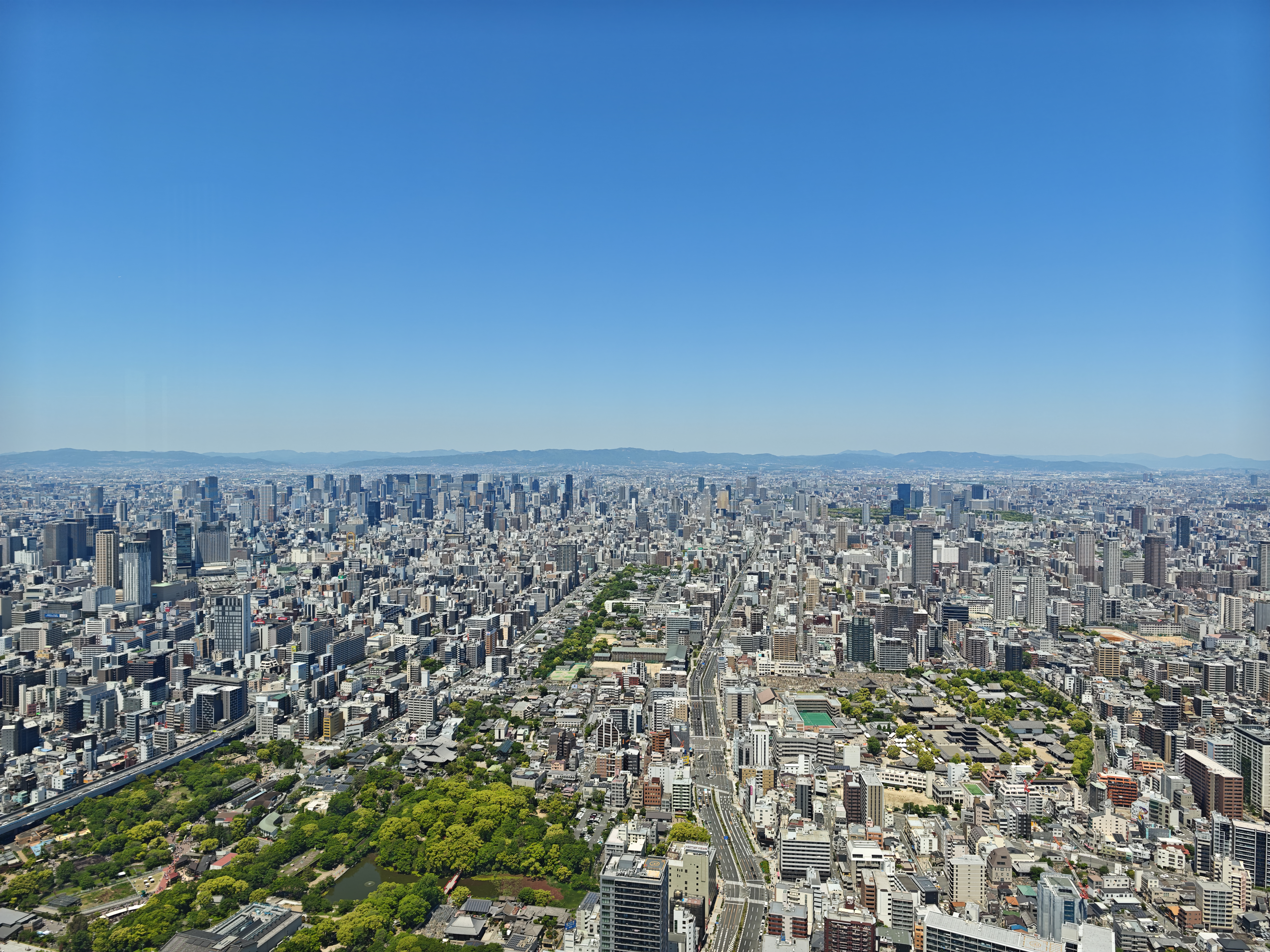
Central Osaka looking north from the Abeno Harukas observation deck (2026)

Osaka Skyline from Osaka Castle (2024)

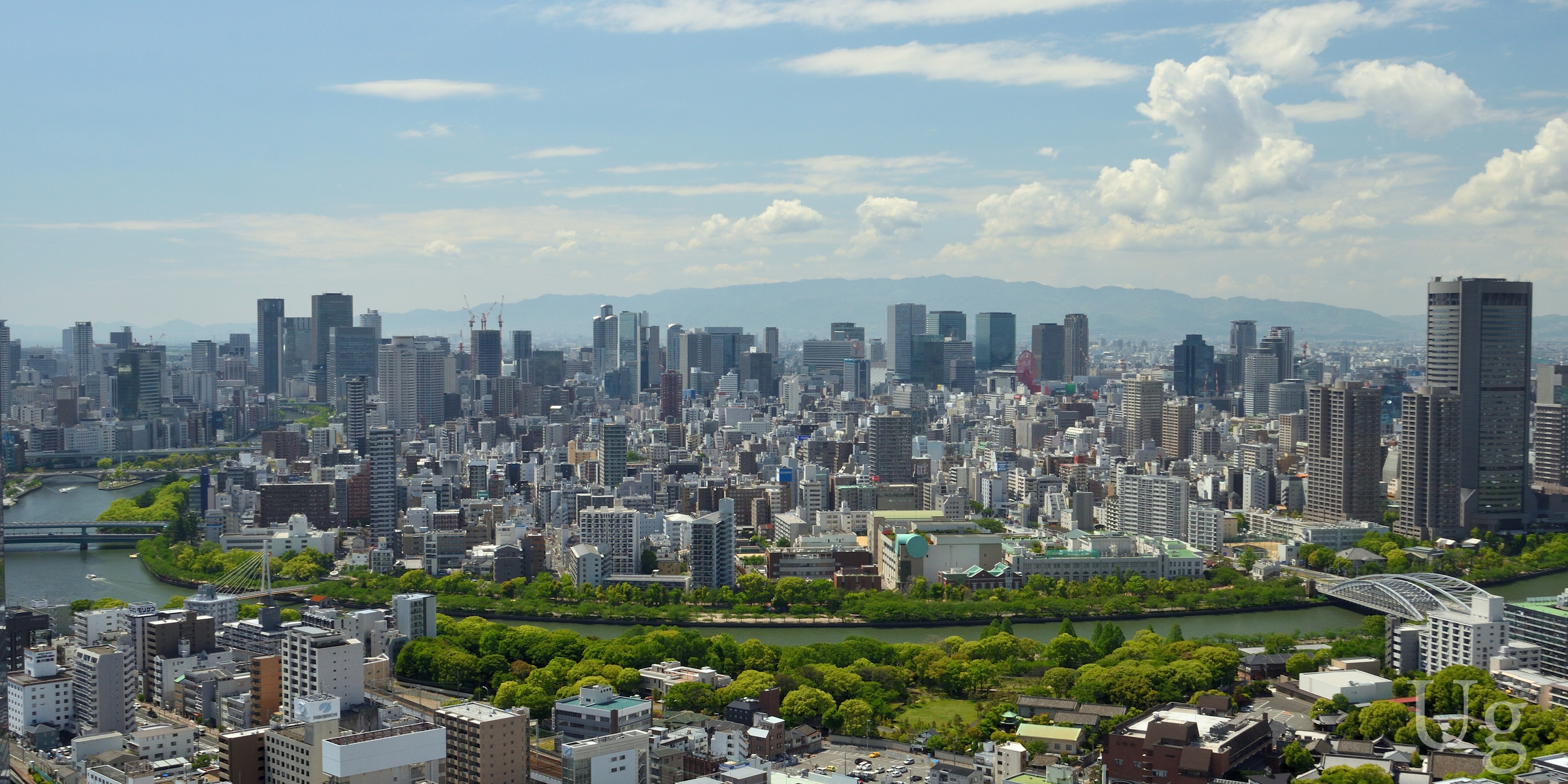
Osaka skyline towards Umeda (2014)

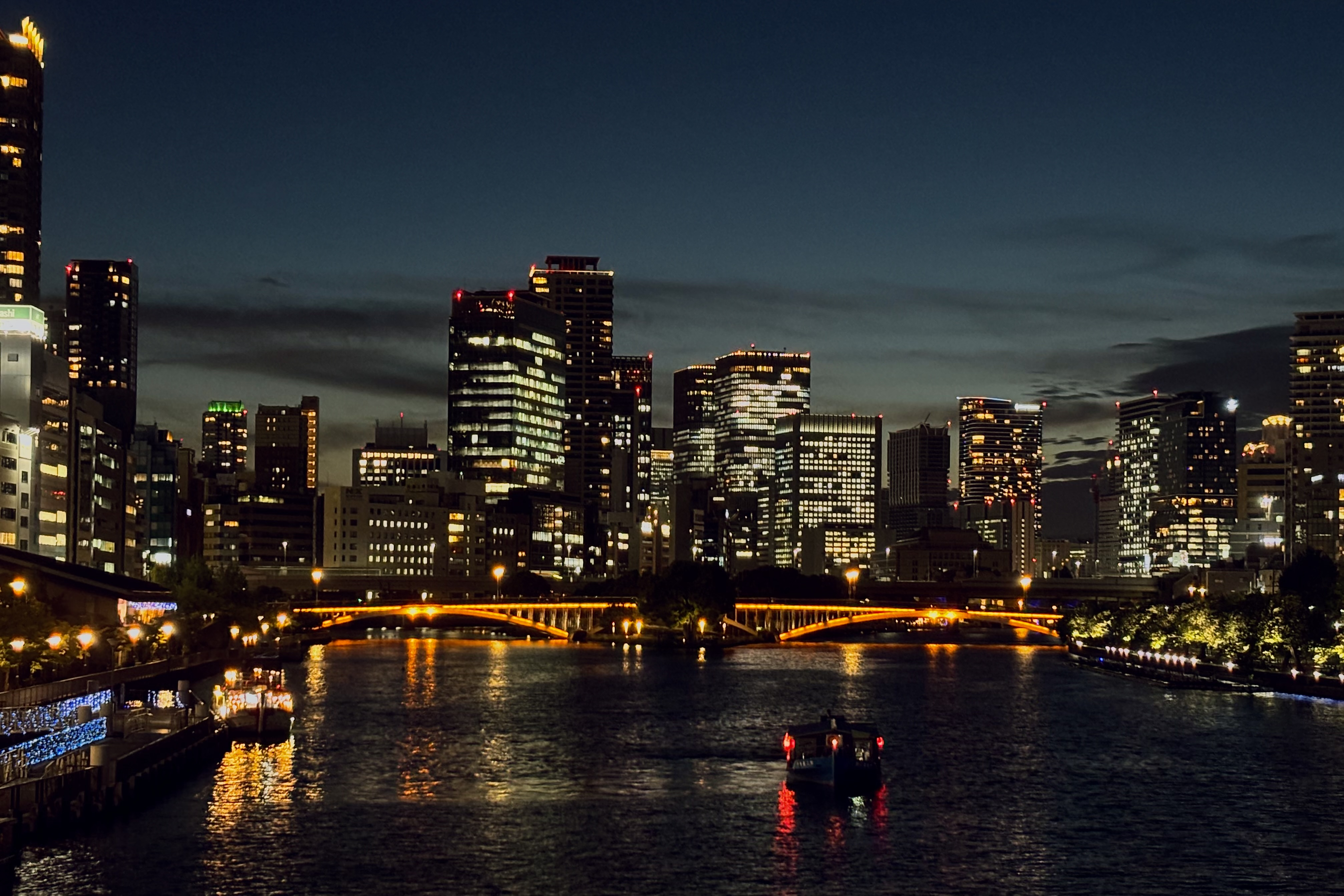
Night view of Nakanoshima (2026)

=== Neighborhoods ===
Central Osaka is roughly divided into downtown and uptown areas known as Kita (キタ; "north") and Minami (ミナミ; "south").

Kita is home to the Umeda district and its immediate surrounding neighborhoods, a major business and retail hub that plays host to Osaka Station City and a large subterranean network of shopping arcades. Kita and nearby Nakanoshima contain a prominent portion of the city's skyscrapers and are often featured in photographs of Osaka's skyline.

Minami, though meaning "south", is essentially in Chūō Ward (中央区, Chūō-ku) and geographically central within the city. Well known districts here include Namba and Shinsaibashi shopping areas, the Dōtonbori canal entertainment area, Nipponbashi Den Den Town, as well as arts and fashion culture-oriented areas such as Amerikamura and Horie. The 300-meter tall Abeno Harukas was the tallest skyscraper in the country from 2014 until 2023.

The business districts between Kita and Minami such as Honmachi and Yodoyabashi, called Semba (船場), house the regional headquarters of many large-scale banks and corporations. The Midōsuji boulevard runs through Semba and connects Kita and Minami.

Further south of Minami are neighborhoods such as Shinsekai (with its Tsūtenkaku tower), Tennoji and Abeno (with Tennoji Zoo, Shitennō-ji and Abeno Harukas), and the Kamagasaki slums, the largest slum in Japan.

The city's west side is a prominent bay area which serves as its main port as well as a tourist destination with attractions such as Kyocera Dome, Universal Studios Japan and the Tempozan Harbor Village. Higashiosaka is zoned as a separate city, although the east side of Osaka city proper contains numerous residential neighborhoods including Tsuruhashi KoreaTown, as well as the Osaka Castle Park, Osaka Business Park and the hub Kyōbashi Station.

Osaka contains numerous urban canals and bridges, many of which serve as the namesake for their surrounding neighborhoods. The phrase "808 bridges of Naniwa" was an expression in old Japan used to indicate impressiveness and the "uncountable". Osaka numbered roughly 200 bridges by the Edo period and 1,629 bridges by 1925. As many of the city's canals were gradually filled in, the number dropped to 872, of which 760 are currently managed by Osaka City.

Gallery

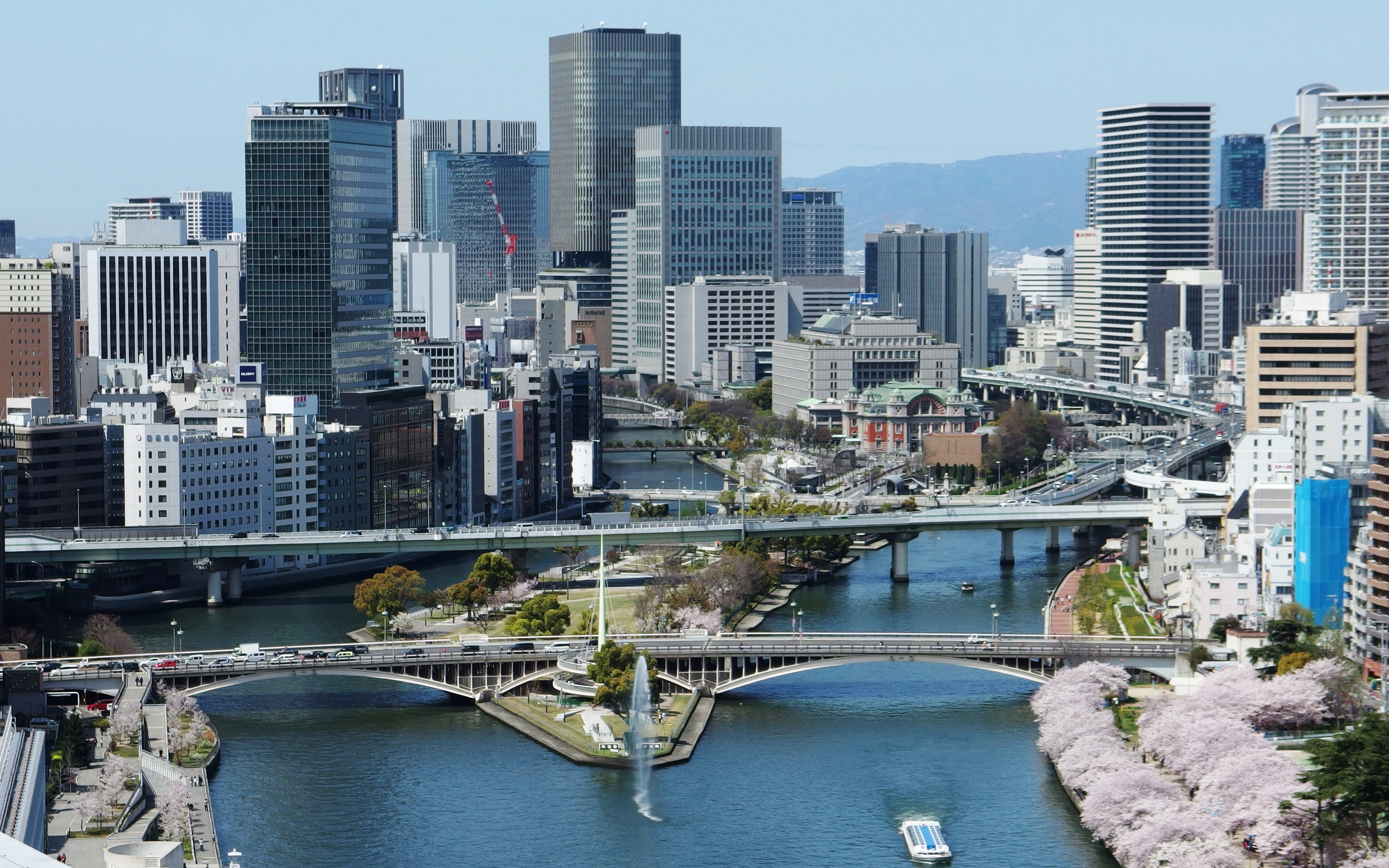
Nakanoshima, a boundary of Kita (right) and Semba (left)

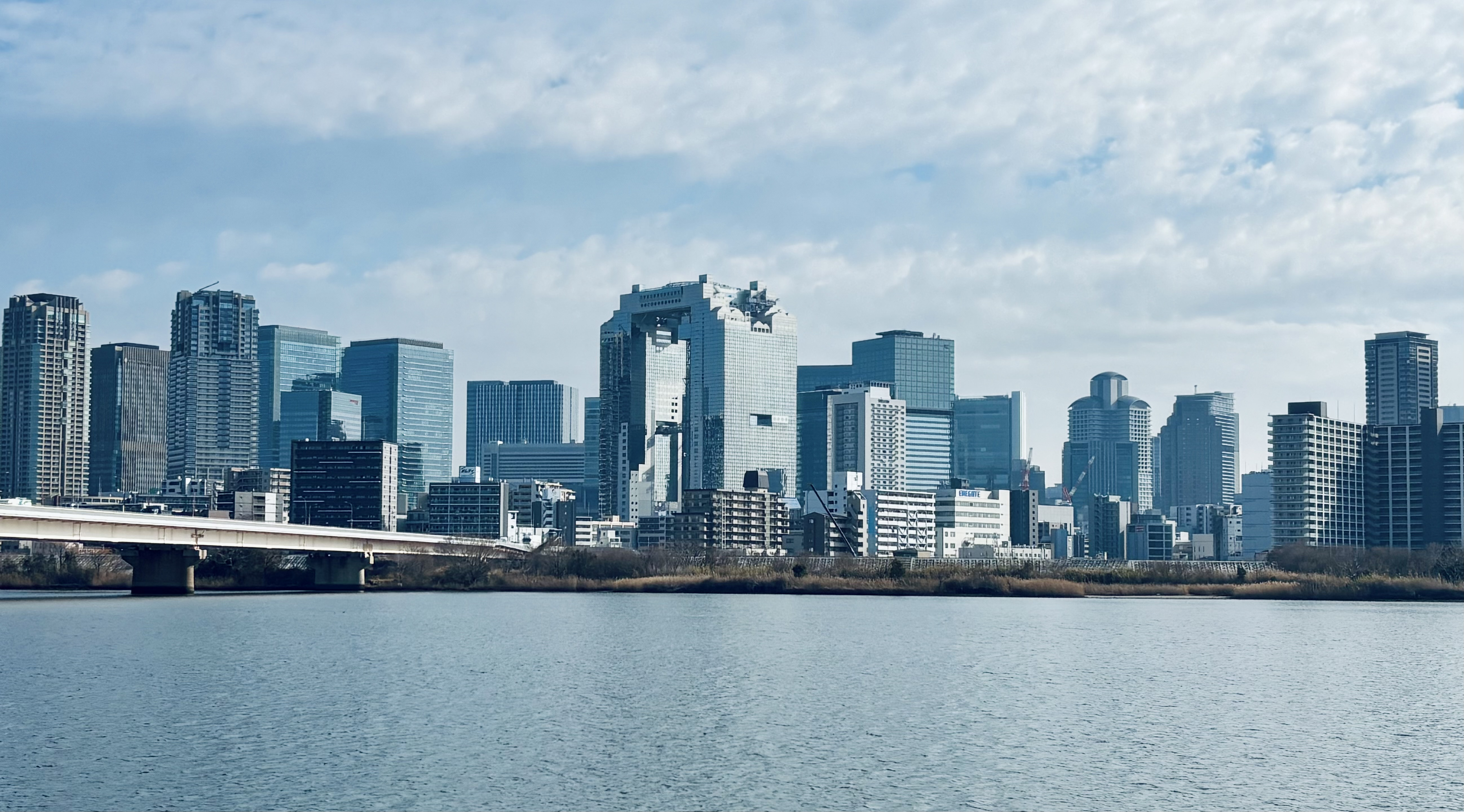
Umeda district (2026)

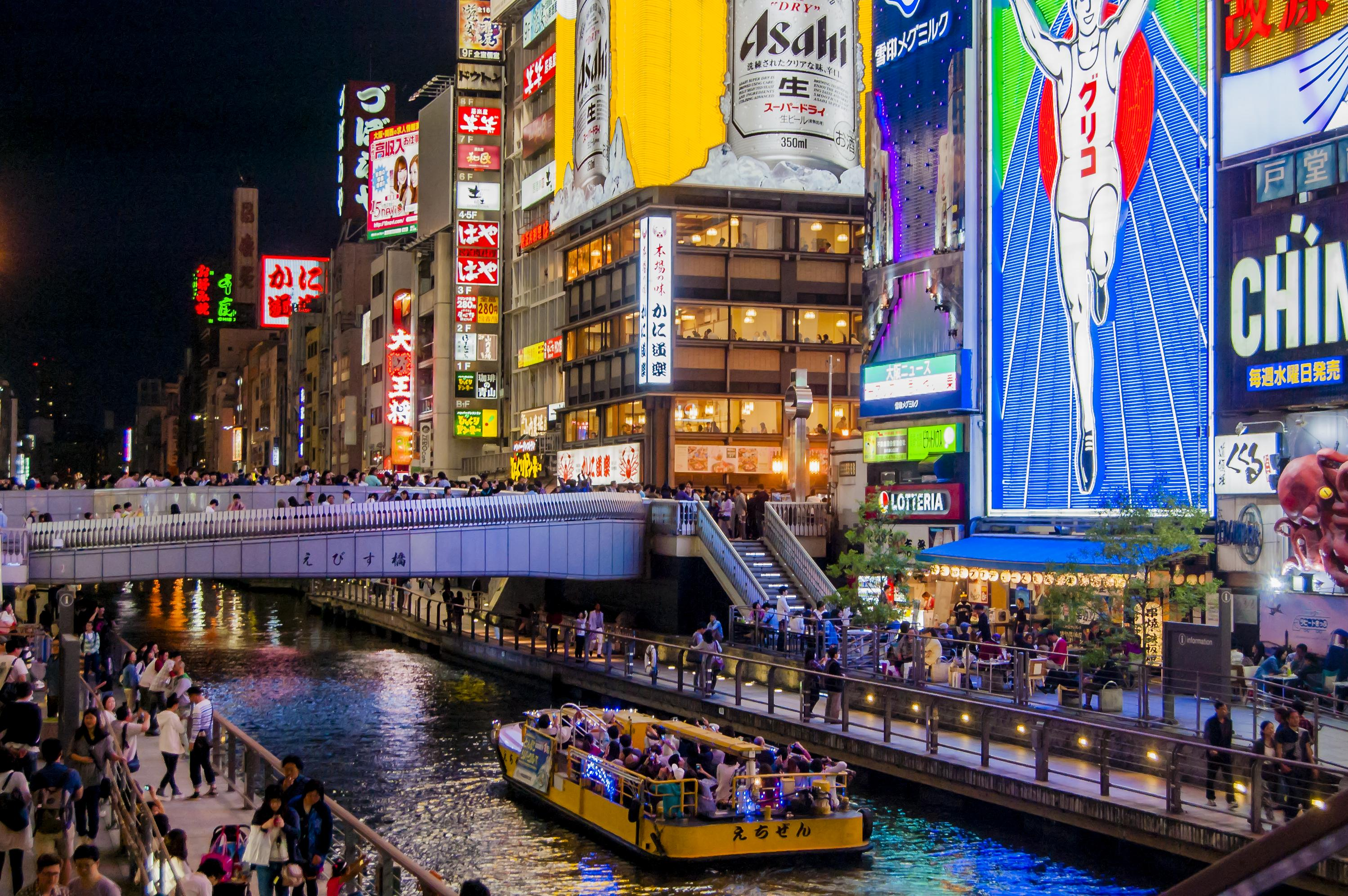
Dōtonbori bridge

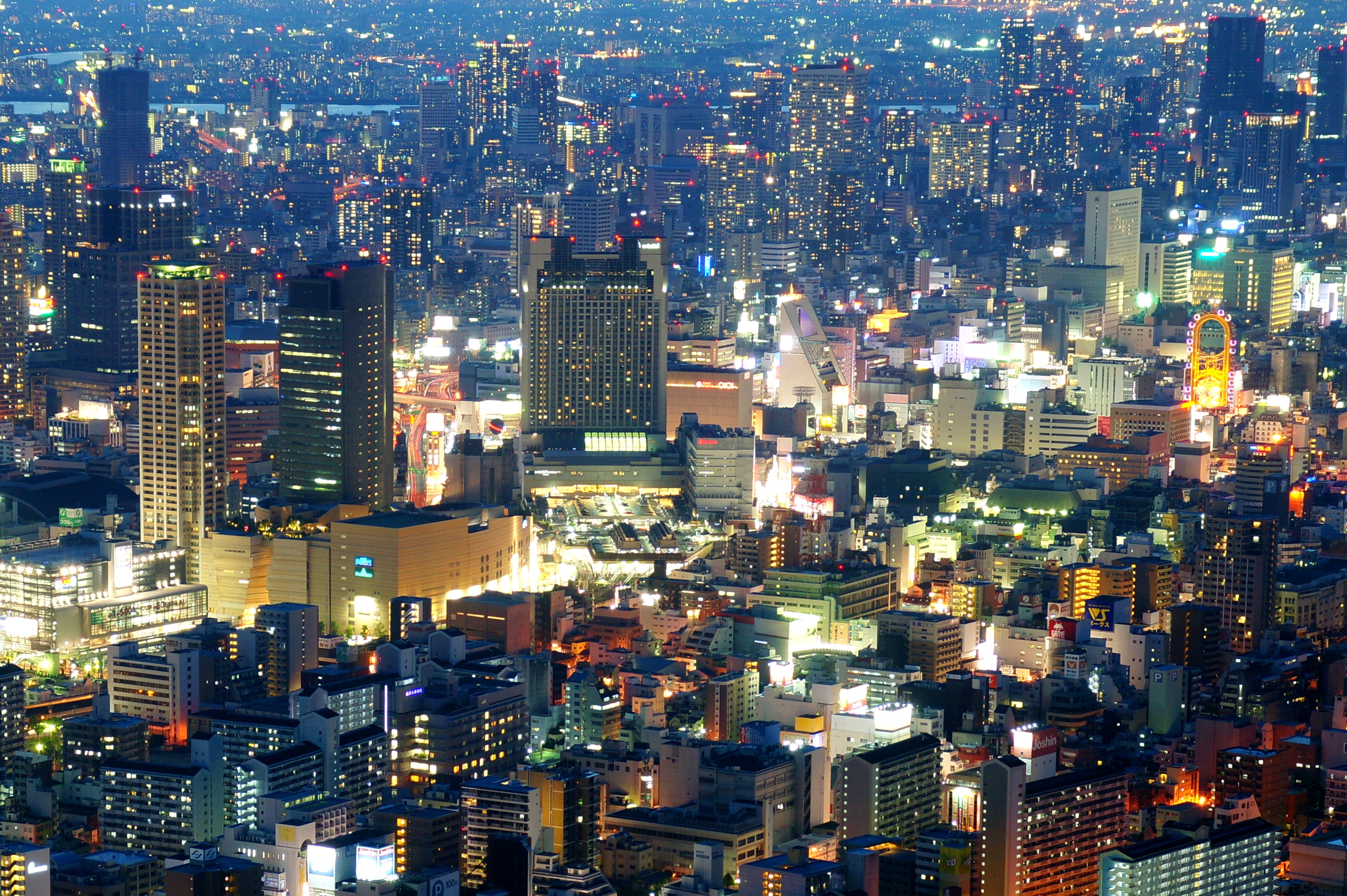
Namba (2015)

== List of wards ==
There are currently 24 wards in Osaka:

	Name		Population	Land area (km^{2})	Pop. density per km^{2}	Map of Osaka
	Romaji	Kanji	Population	Land area (km^{2})	Pop. density per km^{2}	Map of Osaka
1	Abeno-ku	阿倍野区	113,200	5.99	18,890	A map of Osaka's Wards
2	Asahi-ku	旭区	91,284	6.32	14,446	A map of Osaka's Wards
3	Chūō-ku	中央区	119,445	8.87	13,466	A map of Osaka's Wards
4	Fukushima-ku	福島区	82,384	4.67	17,633	A map of Osaka's Wards
5	Higashinari-ku	東成区	88,250	4.54	19,441	A map of Osaka's Wards
6	Higashisumiyoshi-ku	東住吉区	134,834	9.75	13,831	A map of Osaka's Wards
7	Higashiyodogawa-ku	東淀川区	177,809	13.27	13,339	A map of Osaka's Wards
8	Hirano-ku	平野区	187,248	15.28	12,250	A map of Osaka's Wards
9	Ikuno-ku	生野区	127,792	8.37	15,263	A map of Osaka's Wards
10	Jōtō-ku	城東区	171,005	8.38	20,399	A map of Osaka's Wards
11	Kita-ku (administrative center)	北区	143,809	10.34	13,908	A map of Osaka's Wards
12	Konohana-ku	此花区	64,037	19.25	3,327	A map of Osaka's Wards
13	Minato-ku	港区	80,647	7.86	10,259	A map of Osaka's Wards
14	Miyakojima-ku	都島区	107,774	6.08	17,723	A map of Osaka's Wards
15	Naniwa-ku	浪速区	80,070	4.39	18,246	A map of Osaka's Wards
16	Nishi-ku	西区	112,706	5.21	21,636	A map of Osaka's Wards
17	Nishinari-ku	西成区	105,351	7.37	14,293	A map of Osaka's Wards
18	Nishiyodogawa-ku	西淀川区	98,641	14.22	6,937	A map of Osaka's Wards
19	Suminoe-ku	住之江区	117,417	20.61	5,699	A map of Osaka's Wards
20	Sumiyoshi-ku	住吉区	152,986	9.40	16,279	A map of Osaka's Wards
21	Taishō-ku	大正区	61,891	9.43	6,563	A map of Osaka's Wards
22	Tennōji-ku	天王寺区	85,711	4.84	17,709	A map of Osaka's Wards
23	Tsurumi-ku	鶴見区	111,570	8.17	13,652	A map of Osaka's Wards
24	Yodogawa-ku	淀川区	187,245	12.64	14,812	A map of Osaka's Wards

== Demographics ==
Historical population
Year	Pop.	±%
1870	271,992	—
1880	292,636	+7.6%
1890	483,609	+65.3%
1900	881,344	+82.2%
1910	1,239,373	+40.6%
1920	1,798,295	+45.1%
1925	2,135,248	+18.7%
1930	2,477,959	+16.1%
1935	3,022,425	+22.0%
1940	3,300,714	+9.2%
1945	1,614,632	−51.1%
1950	2,015,350	+24.8%
1955	2,547,316	+26.4%
1960	3,011,563	+18.2%
1965	3,156,222	+4.8%
1970	2,980,487	−5.6%
1975	2,778,987	−6.8%
1980	2,648,180	−4.7%
1985	2,636,249	−0.5%
1990	2,623,801	−0.5%
1995	2,602,421	−0.8%
2000	2,598,774	−0.1%
2005	2,628,811	+1.2%
2010	2,666,371	+1.4%
2015	2,691,185	+0.9%
2020	2,752,024	+2.3%

Population numbers have been recorded in Osaka since as early as 1873, in the early Meiji era. According to the census in 2005, there were 2,628,811 residents in Osaka, an increase of 30,037 or 1.2% from 2000. There were 1,280,325 households with approximately 2.1 persons per household. The population density was 11,836 persons per km^{2}. The Great Kantō earthquake caused a mass migration to Osaka between 1920 and 1930, and the city became Japan's largest city in 1930 with 2,453,573 people, outnumbering even Tokyo, which had a population of 2,070,913. The population peaked at 3,252,340 in 1940, and had a post-war peak of 3,156,222 in 1965, but has declined since, as the residents moved out to the suburbs.

There were 144,123 registered foreigners, the two largest groups being Korean (60,110) and Chinese (39,551). Ikuno, with its Tsuruhashi district, is the home to one of the largest populations of Korean residents in Japan, with 20,397 registered Zainichi Koreans.

=== Dialect ===
The commonly spoken dialect of this area is Osaka-ben, a typical sub-dialect of Kansai-ben. Of the many other particularities that characterize Osaka-ben, examples include using the copula ya instead of da, and the suffix -hen instead of -nai in negative verb forms.

== Government ==
Local administration
- The Mayor and the Council
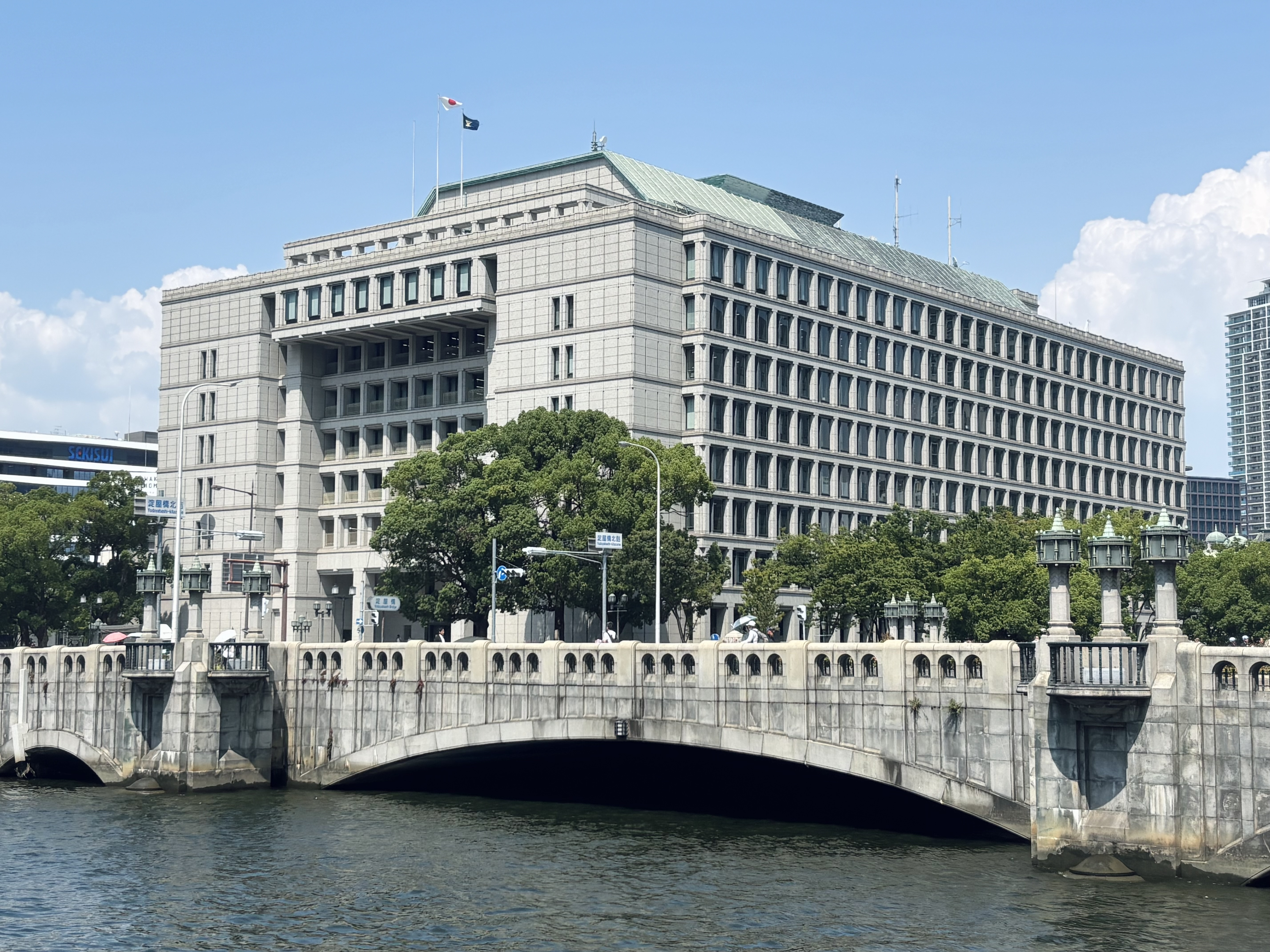
- Osaka City Hall
- Mayor: Ichiro Matsui
- Vice Mayors: Toru Takahashi, Shin Asakawa, Tsuyoshi Yamamoto

City Council
- President: Toshifumi Tagaya (LDP)
- Members: 83 councilors (7 vacant)
- Factions: Osaka Restoration Association (36), Liberal Democratic Party and Citizen's Club (20), Komei Party (19), Japanese Communist Party (9), Go OSAKA (1); Osaka Abe (1)
- Seats by districts: Ward (no. of seats): Abeno-ku (4), Asahi-ku (4), Chūō-ku (2), Fukushima-ku (2), Higashinari-ku (3), Higashisumiyoshi-ku (5), Higashiyodogawa-ku (6), Hirano-ku (6), Ikuno-ku (5), Jōtō-ku (5), Kita-ku (3), Konohana-ku (3), Minato-ku (3), Miyakojima-ku (3), Naniwa-ku (2), Nishi-ku (2), Nishinari-ku (5), Nishiyodogawa-ku (3), Suminoe-ku (4), Sumiyoshi-ku (6), Taishō-ku (3), Tennōji-ku (2), Tsurumi-ku (3), Yodogawa-ku (5)
- Website: Osaka City Council
- Note: As of October 27, 2017

The Osaka City Council is the city's local government formed under the Local Autonomy Law. The council has eighty-nine seats, allocated to the twenty-four wards proportional to their population and re-elected by the citizens every four years. The council elects its president and Vice President. Toshifumi Tagaya (LDP) is the current and 104th president since May 2008.

The mayor of Osaka is directly elected by the citizens every four years, in accordance with the Local Autonomy Law. Hideyuki Yokoyama is the current mayor of Osaka having won the mayoral election in 2023 and 2026. The mayor is supported by two vice mayors.

Osaka also houses several agencies of the Japanese government. Below is a list of governmental offices housed in Osaka.

- Japan Coast Guard, Fifth Regional Headquarters
- Japan Fair Trade Commission; Kinki, Chugoku, Shikoku Office
- Kinki Regional Finance Bureau
- Kinki Regional Economy, Trade and Industry Bureau
- Kinki Regional Transportation Bureau
- Kinki Communications Bureau
- Kinki Regional Development Bureau
- Kinki Regional Police Bureau
- Ministry of Foreign Affairs, Osaka Office
- Osaka Customs
- Osaka District Court
- Osaka Family Court
- Osaka High Court
- Osaka Immigration
- Osaka Labour Bureau
- Osaka Meteorological Observatory
- Osaka Public Prosecutors Office
- Osaka Regional Aerospace Bureau
- Osaka Regional Law Bureau
- Osaka Regional Taxation Bureau
- Osaka Summary Court

=== Developments ===
In July 2012, a joint multi-party bill was submitted to the Diet that would allow for implementation of the Osaka Metropolis plan as pursued by the mayor of Osaka city, the governor of Osaka and their party. If implemented, Osaka City, neighboring Sakai City and possibly other surrounding municipalities would dissolve and be reorganized as four special wards of Osaka prefecture – similar to former Tokyo City's successor wards within Tokyo prefecture. Special wards are municipal-level administrative units that leave some otherwise municipal administrative responsibilities and revenues to the prefectural administration.

In October 2018, the city of Osaka officially ended its sister city relationship with San Francisco in the United States after the latter permitted a monument memorializing "comfort women" to remain on a city-owned property, circulating in the process a 10-page, 3,800-word letter in English addressed to San Francisco mayor London Breed.

In November 2020, a second referendum to merge Osaka's 24 wards into 4 semi-autonomous wards was narrowly voted down. There were 692,996 (50.6%) votes against and 675,829 (49.4%) votes supported it. Osaka mayor and Osaka Ishin co-leader Ichiro Matsui said he would resign when his term ended in 2023.

=== Energy policies ===
==== Nuclear power ====
In February 2012, three Kansai cities, Kyoto, Osaka, and Kobe, jointly asked Kansai Electric Power Company to break its dependence on nuclear power. In a letter to KEPCO they also requested to disclose information on the demand and supply of electricity, and for lower and stable prices. The three cities were stockholders of the plant: Osaka owned 9% of the shares, Kobe had 3% and Kyoto 0.45%. In June 2012, Toru Hashimoto, the mayor of Osaka, announced a proposal to minimize the dependence on nuclear power for the shareholders meeting.

In March 2012, the city of Osaka decided that as the largest shareholder of Kansai Electric Power Co, that at the next shareholders-meeting in June 2012 it would demand a series of changes:

- that Kansai Electric would be split into two companies, separating power generation from power transmission.
- a reduction of the number of the utility's executives and employees.
- the implementation of absolutely secure measurements to ensuring the safety of the nuclear facilities.
- the disposing of spent fuel.
- the installation of new kind of thermal power generation to secure non-nuclear supply of energy.
- selling all unnecessary assets including the stock holdings of KEPCO.

In this action, Osaka secured the support of two other cities and shareholders: Kyoto and Kobe. With their combined voting-rights of 12.5 percent, they were not certain of the ultimate outcome. Two-thirds of the shareholders would be needed to agree to revise the corporate charter.

At a meeting held on April 10, 2012, by the "energy strategy council", formed by the city of Osaka and the governments of the prefectures, it became clear that at the end of the fiscal year 2011 some 69 employees of Kansai Electric Power Company were former public servants. "Amakudari" is the Japanese name for this practice of rewarding, by hiring officials that formerly controlled and supervised the firm. Such people included the following:

- 13 ex-officials of the: Ministry of Land, Infrastructure, Transport and Tourism
- 3 ex-officials of the Ministry of Economy, Trade and Industry,
- 2 ex-officials of the Ministry of the Environment,
- 16 former policemen,
- 10 former fire-fighters,
- 13 former civil engineers.

Besides this, it became known that Kansai Electric had made about 600 external financial donations, to a total sum of about 1.695 billion yen:

- 70 donations were paid to local governments: to a total of 699 million yen
- 100 donations to public-service organizations: 443 million yen,
- 430 donations to various organizations and foundations: a total of 553 million yen

During this meeting, some 8 conditions were compiled, that needed to be fulfilled before a restart of the No.3 and No.4 reactors Oi Nuclear Power Plant:

- the consent of the local people and government within 100 kilometer from the plant
- the installation of a new independent regulatory agency
- a nuclear safety agreement
- the establishment of new nuclear safety standards
- stress tests and evaluations based on these new safety rules

== Economy ==
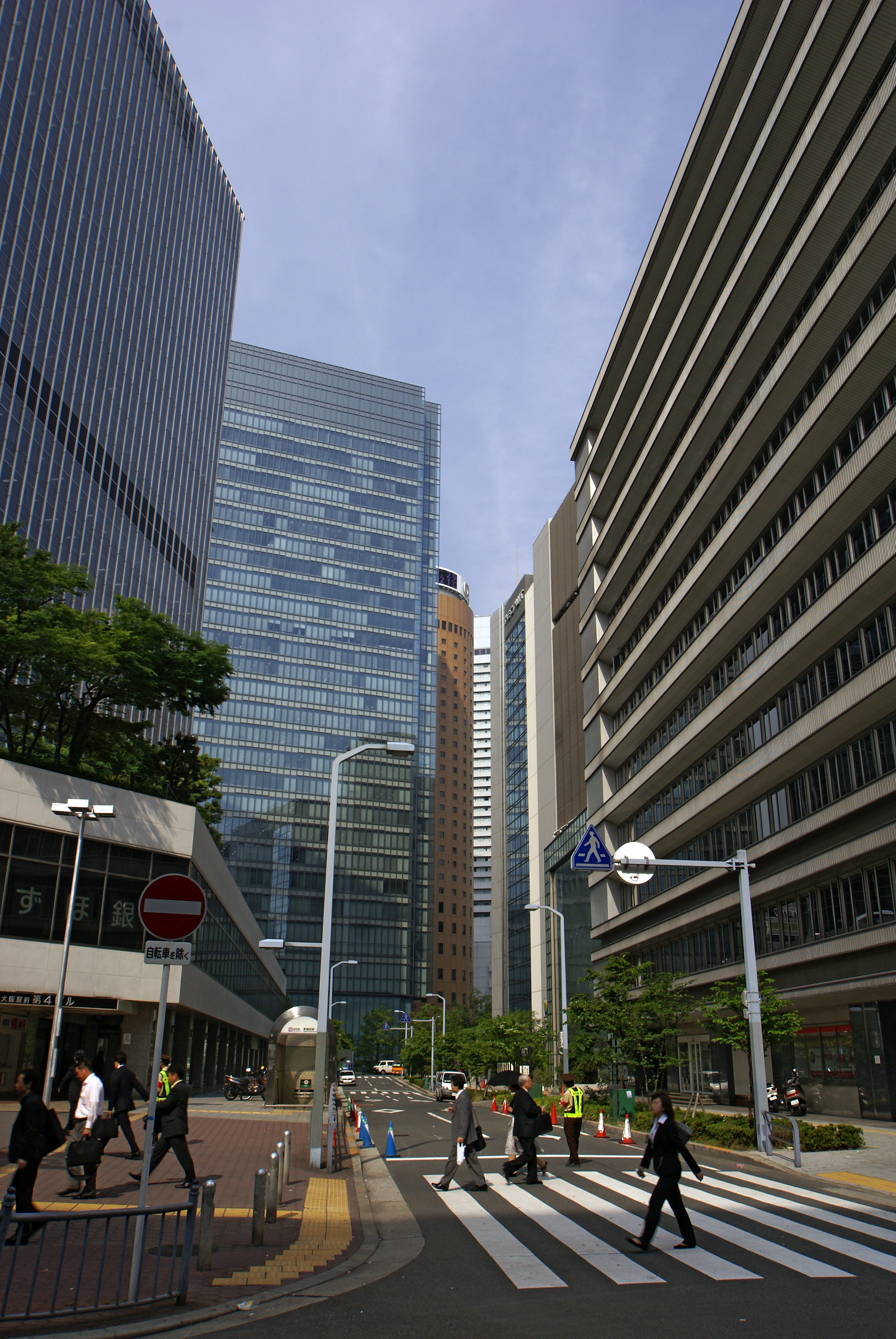
A street in Umeda, Osaka

The gross city product of Osaka in fiscal year 2004 was ¥21.3 trillion, an increase of 1.2% over the previous year. The figure accounts for about 55% of the total output in the Osaka Prefecture and 26.5% in the Kinki region. In 2004, commerce, services, and manufacturing have been the three major industries, accounting for 30%, 26%, and 11% of the total, respectively. The per capita income in the city was about ¥3.3 million, 10% higher than that of the Osaka Prefecture. MasterCard Worldwide reported that Osaka ranks 19th among the world's leading cities and plays an important role in the global economy. Osaka's GDP per capita (Nominal) was $59,958.($1=\120.13) However, by 2020, Osaka ranked as the 5th most expensive city due to flatlining consumer prices and government subsidies of public transportation.

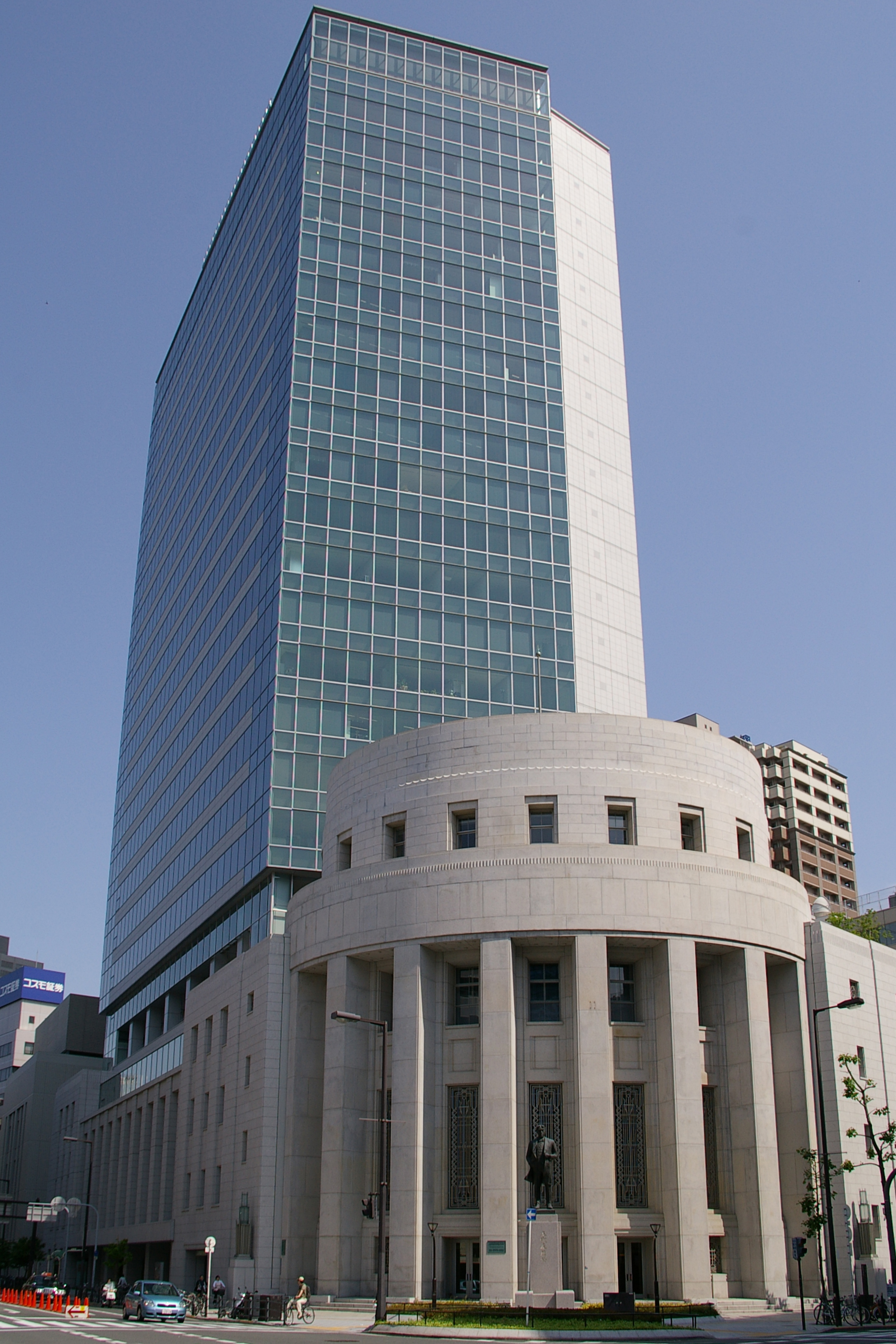
Osaka Exchange in the Kitahama district of Osaka

Historically, Osaka was the center of commerce in Japan, especially in the middle and pre-modern ages. Nomura Securities, the first brokerage firm in Japan, was founded in the city in 1925, and Osaka still houses a leading futures exchange. Many major companies have since moved their main offices to Tokyo. However, several major companies, such as Panasonic, Sharp, and Sanyo, are still headquartered in Osaka. In the 2017 Global Financial Centres Index, Osaka was ranked as having the 15th most competitive financial center in the world and fifth most competitive in Asia (after Singapore, Hong Kong, Tokyo, and Shanghai).

The Osaka Securities Exchange, specializing in derivatives such as Nikkei 225 futures, is based in Osaka. The merger with JASDAQ will help the Osaka Securities Exchange become the largest exchange in Japan for start-up companies.

According to global consulting firm Mercer, Osaka was the second most expensive city for expatriate employees in the world in 2009. It jumped up nine places from 11th place in 2008 and was the eighth most expensive city in 2007. However, it was not ranked in the top ten places of the list in 2013. The Economist Intelligence Unit (EIU) ranked Osaka as the second most expensive city in the world in its 2013 Cost of Living study.

=== Keihanshin region ===
Osaka is part of the metropolitan region called Keihanshin (also known as Greater Osaka) in the Kansai region. The Keihanshin region includes the prefectures of Osaka, Kyoto, Hyōgo (Kobe), Nara, Shiga, Wakayama, and Sakai. The Keihanshin region has a population (as of 2015) of 19,303,000 (15% of Japan's population) which covers 13,228 km^{2} (5,107 sq mi). It is ranked the second most urban region in Japan after the Greater Tokyo area and 10th largest urban area in the world. Keihanshin has a GDP of approximately $953.9 billion in 2012 (16th largest in the world). Osaka-Kobe has a GDP of $681 billion (2015), which is a bit more than Paris or Greater London.

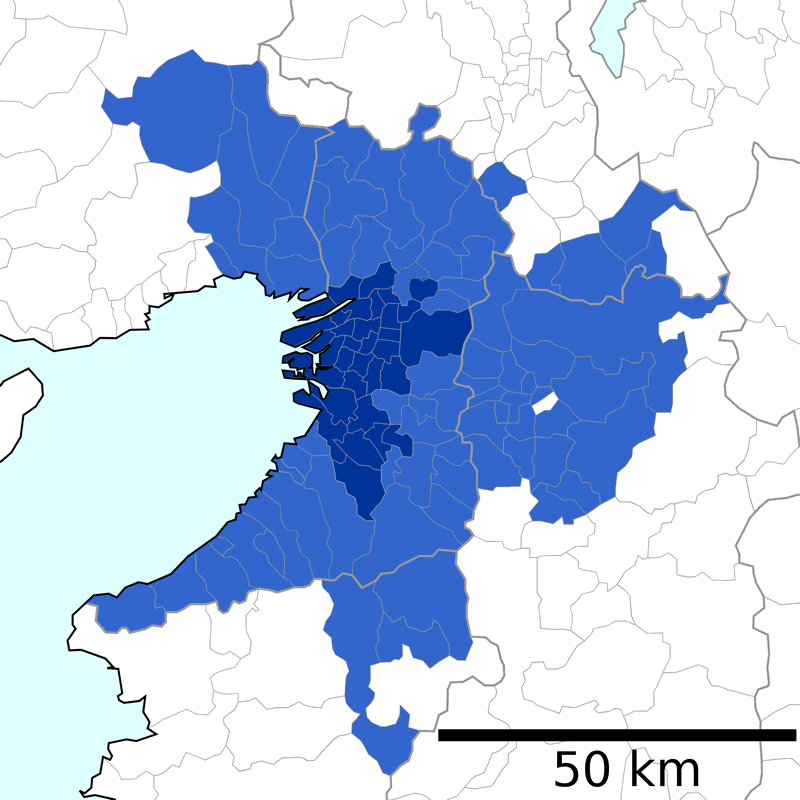
Greater Osaka (without Kyoto) Metropolitan Employment Area

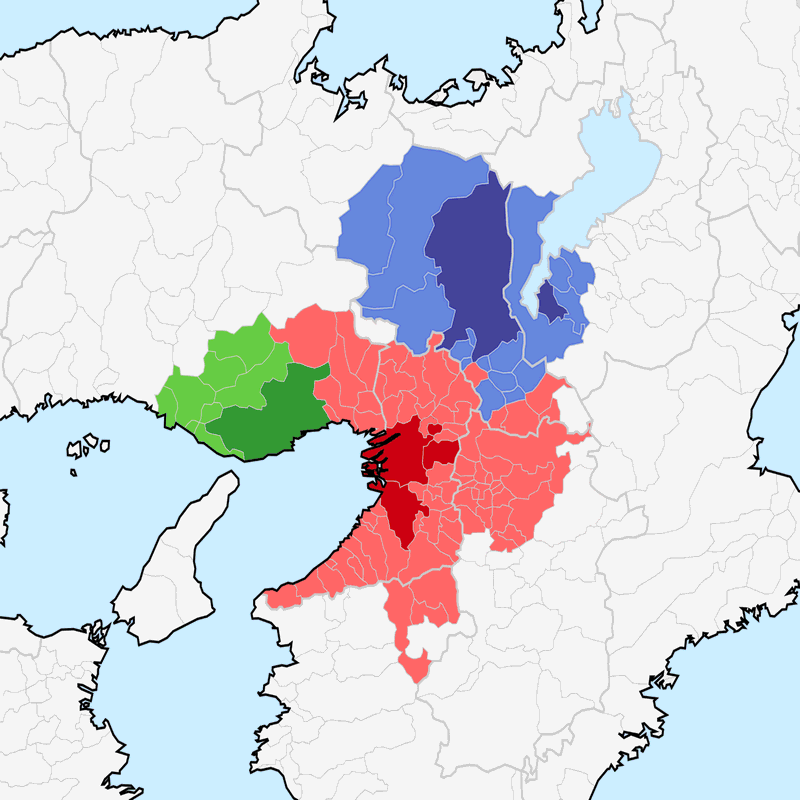
Keihanshin with Osaka (red), Kobe (green), and Kyoto (blue)

== Transportation ==
The black lines represent the commuter rail network serving the Osaka metropolitan area. The pink lines represent the Osaka Metro system. The blue lines represent three rail extension projects: the Osaka Monorail Main Line (right), the Naniwasuji Line (center), and the Osaka Port Transport System Hokkō Line (left).

Greater Osaka has an extensive network of railway lines, comparable to that of Greater Tokyo. Major stations within the city include Umeda (梅田), Namba (難波), Shinsaibashi (心斎橋), Tennōji (天王寺), Kyōbashi (京橋), and Yodoyabashi (淀屋橋).

Osaka connects to its surrounding cities and suburbs via the JR West Urban Network as well as numerous private lines such as Keihan Electric Railway, Hankyu Railway, Hanshin Electric Railway, Kintetsu Railway, and Nankai Electric Railway.

The Osaka Metro system alone ranks 8th in the world by annual passenger ridership, serving over 912 million people annually (a quarter of Greater Osaka Rail System's 4 billion annual riders), despite being only 8 of more than 70 lines in the metro area.

All Shinkansen trains including Nozomi stop at Shin-Osaka Station and provide access to other major cities in Japan, such as Kobe, Kyoto, Nagoya, Yokohama, and Tokyo.

Regular bus services are provided by Osaka City Bus, as well Hankyu, Hanshin and Kintetsu, providing a dense network covering most parts of the city.

Osaka is served by two airports situated just outside the city, Kansai International Airport (IATA: KIX) which handles primarily international passenger flights and international cargo flights and the nearby Osaka Itami Airport (IATA: ITM) which handles mostly domestic services.

Due to its geographical position, Osaka's international ferry connections are far greater than that of Tokyo, with international service to Shanghai, Tianjin, and Busan along with domestic routes to Kitakyushu, Kagoshima, Miyazaki and Okinawa.

== Culture and lifestyle ==
A chef prepares for the evening rush in Umeda.

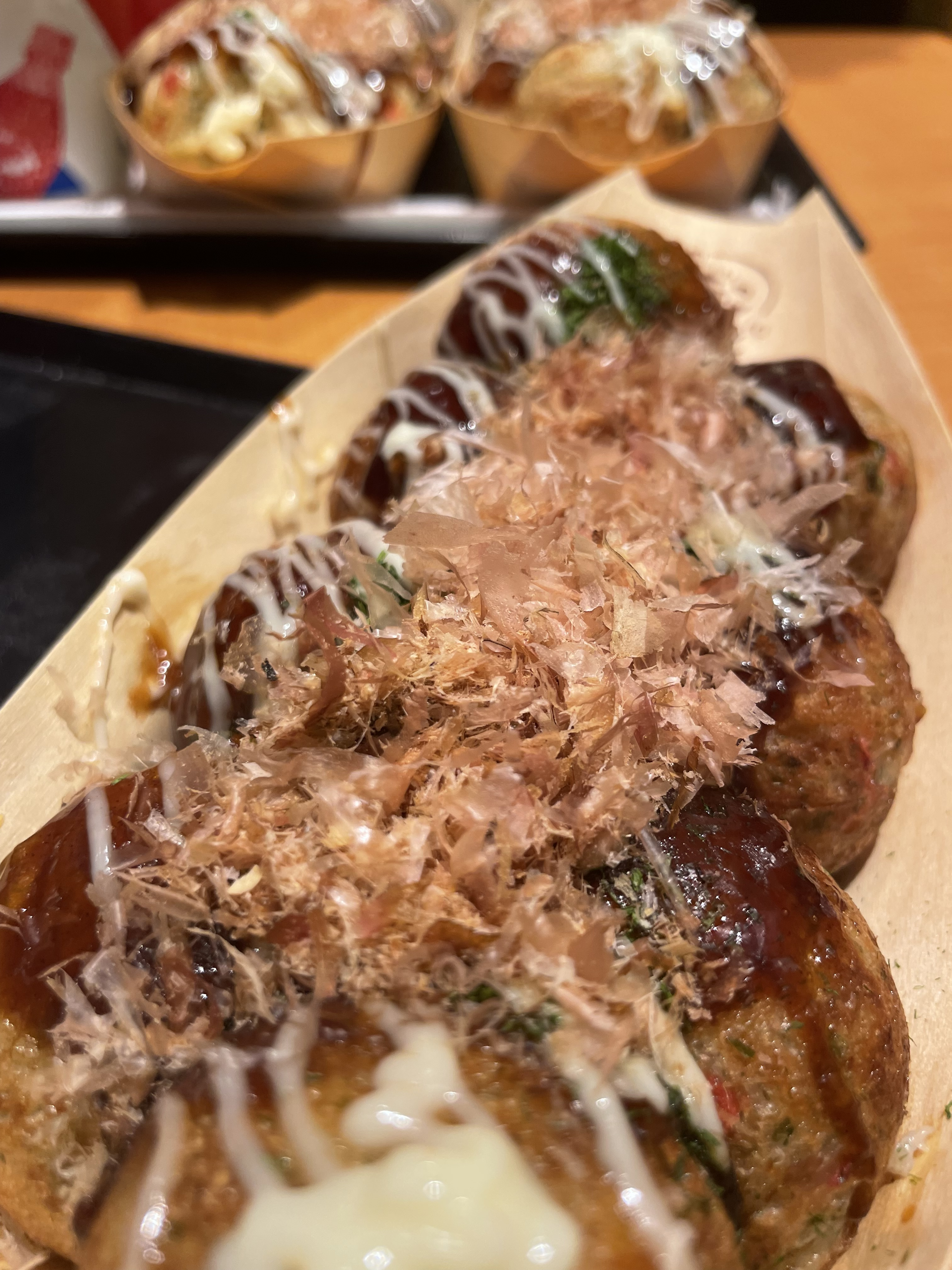
Takoyaki (たこ焼き)

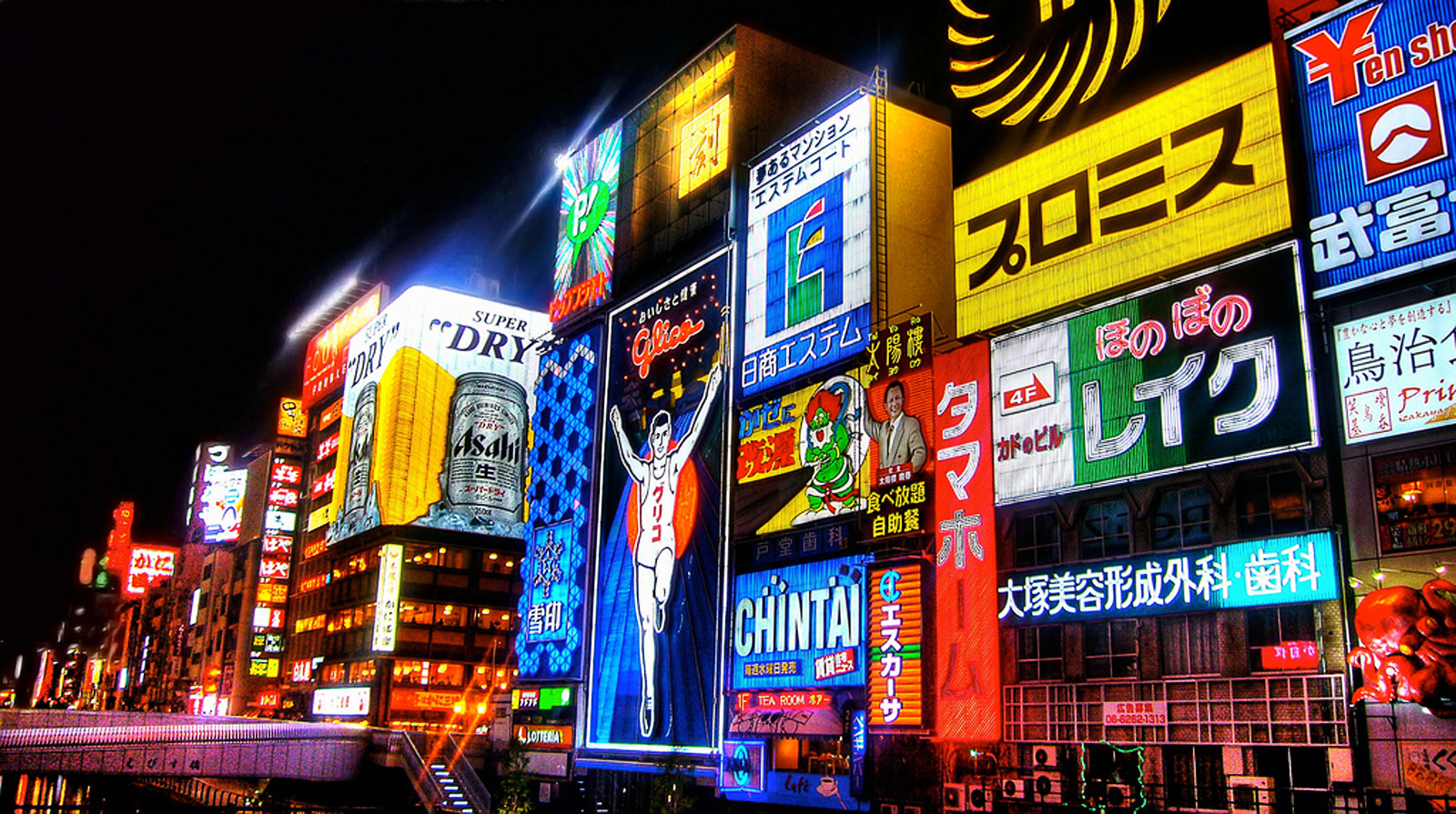
The Glico Man among numerous signboards at Dōtonbori

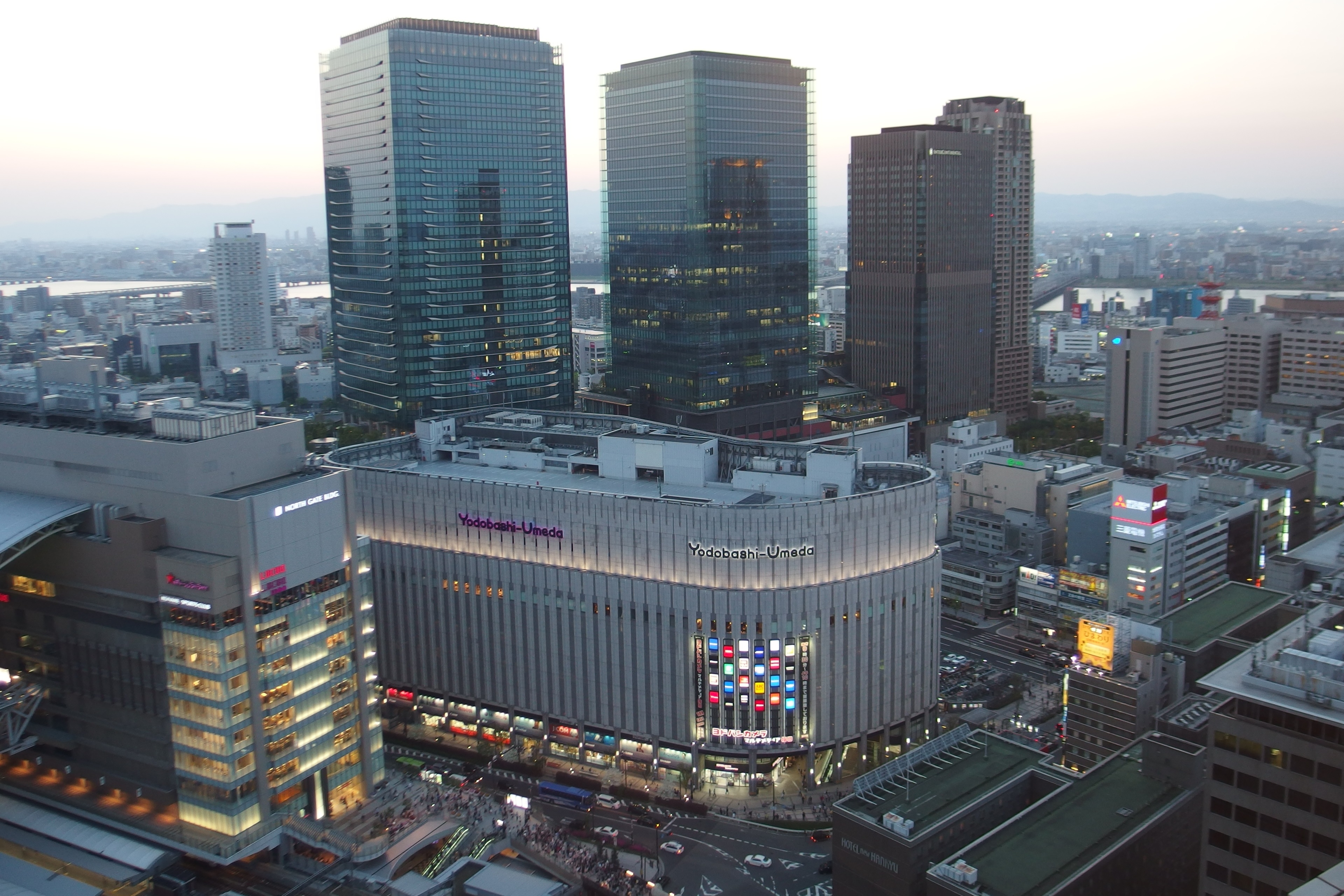
Grand Front Osaka

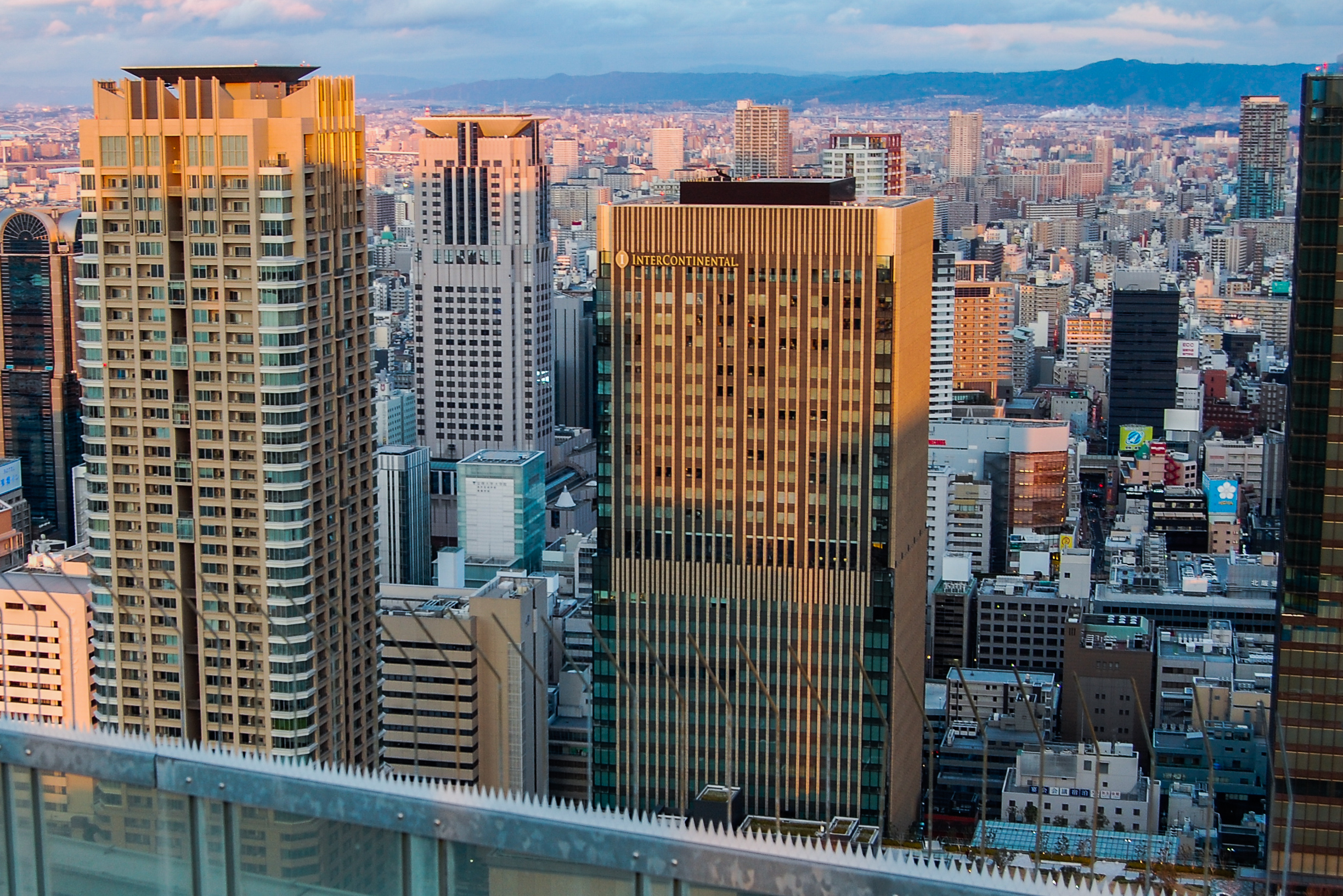
Chayamachi district in Kita-ku

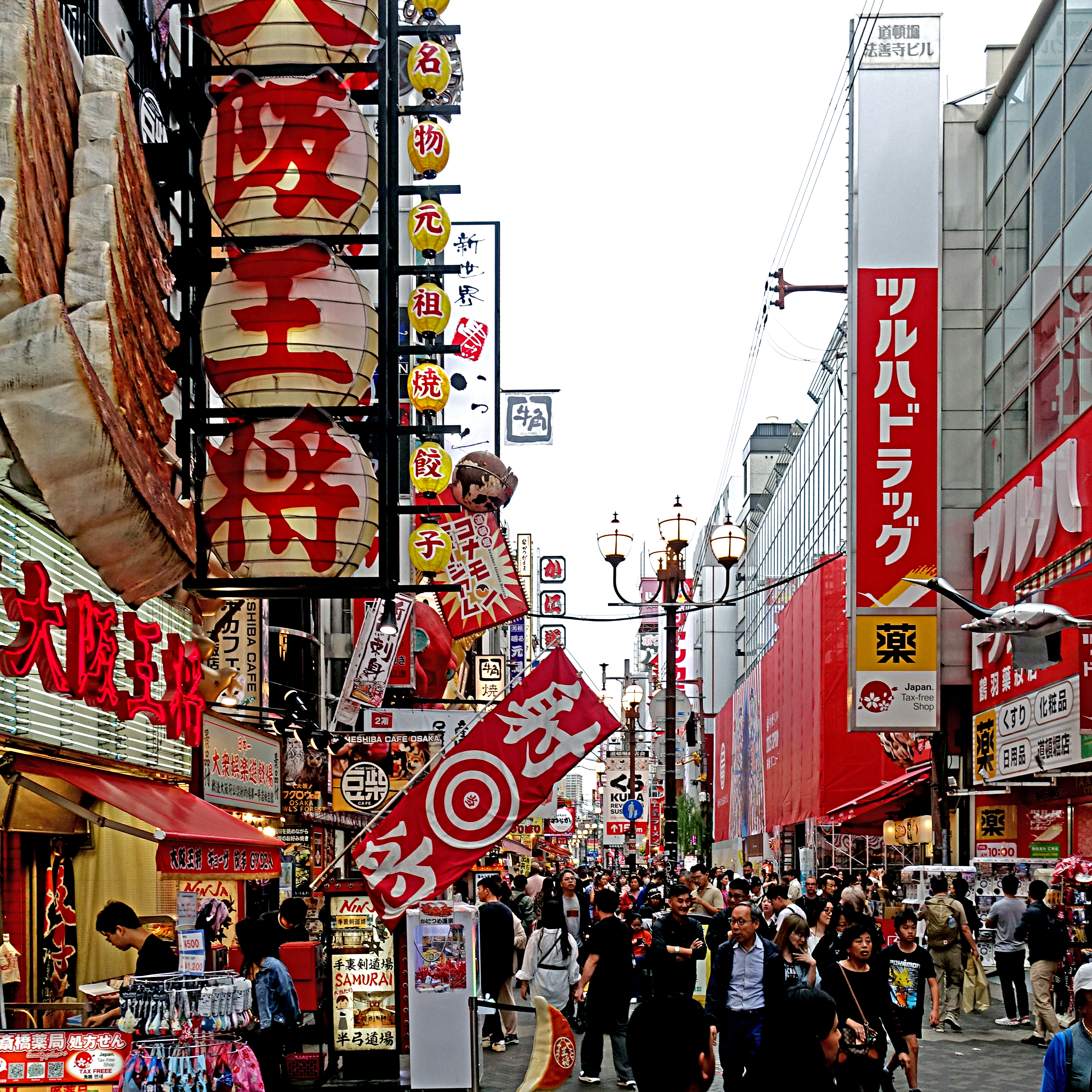
Dōtonbori street scene

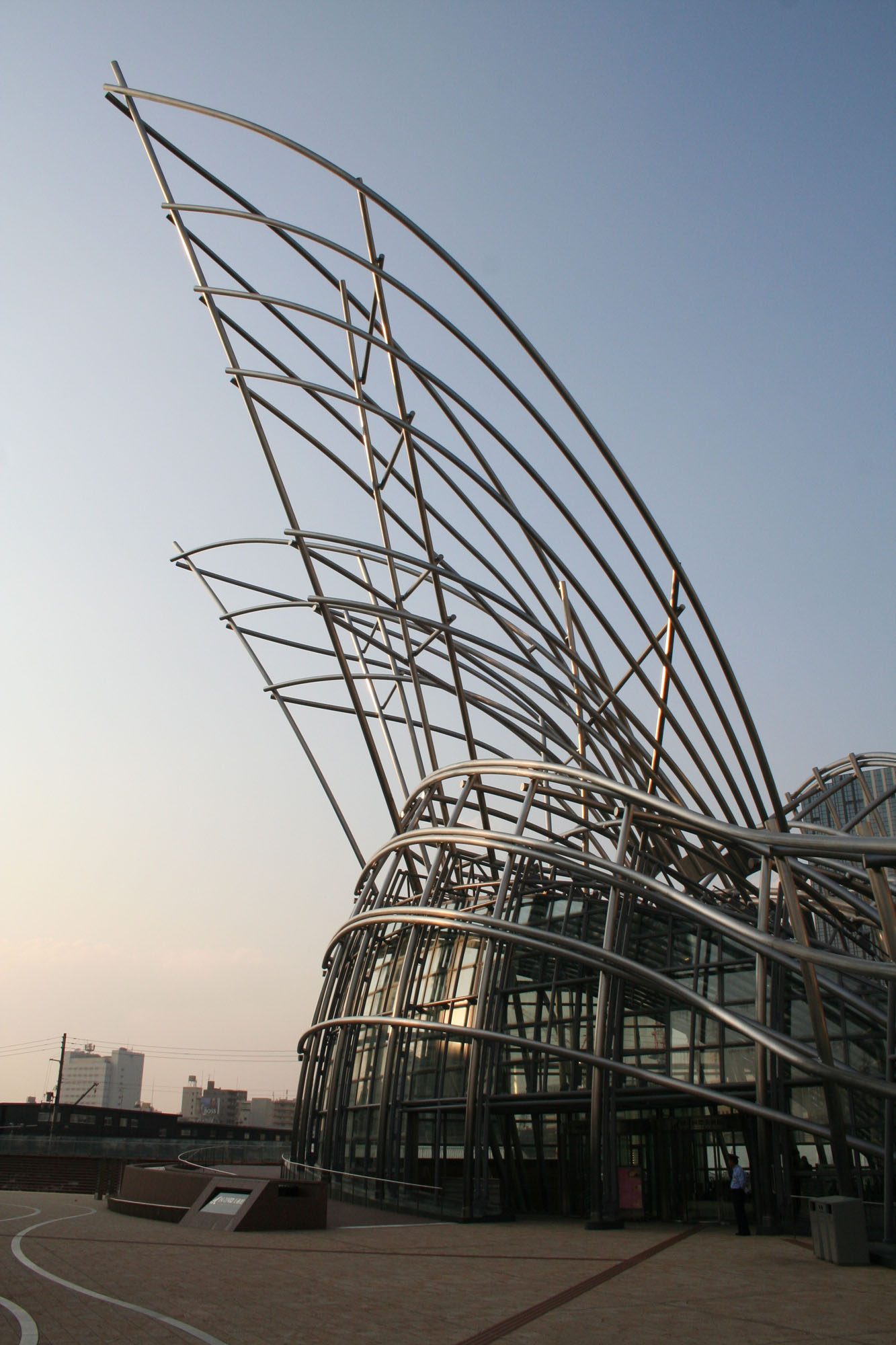
The National Museum of Art, a subterranean museum of Japanese and international art

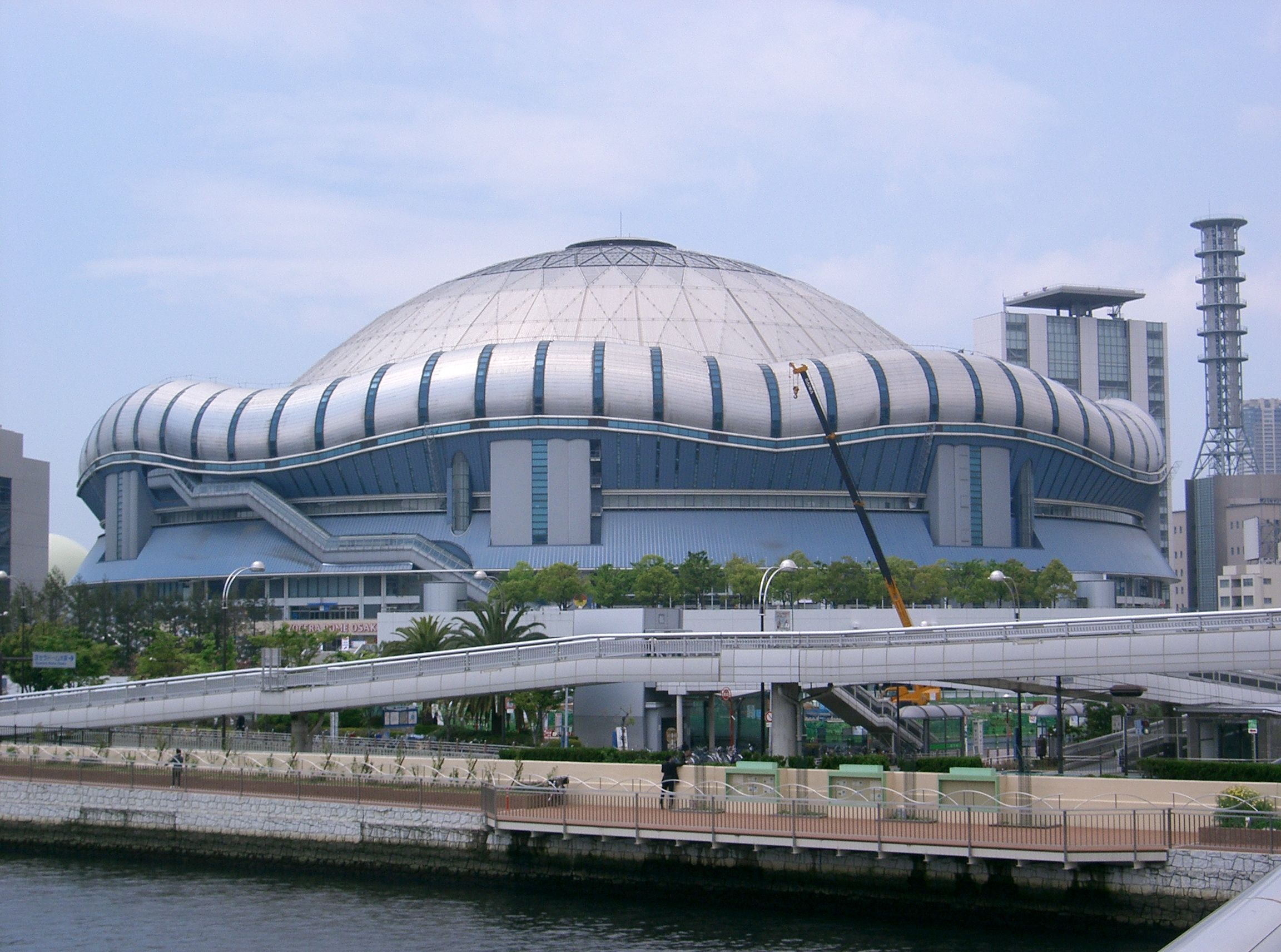
The Osaka Dome, home to the Orix Buffaloes and Hanshin Tigers

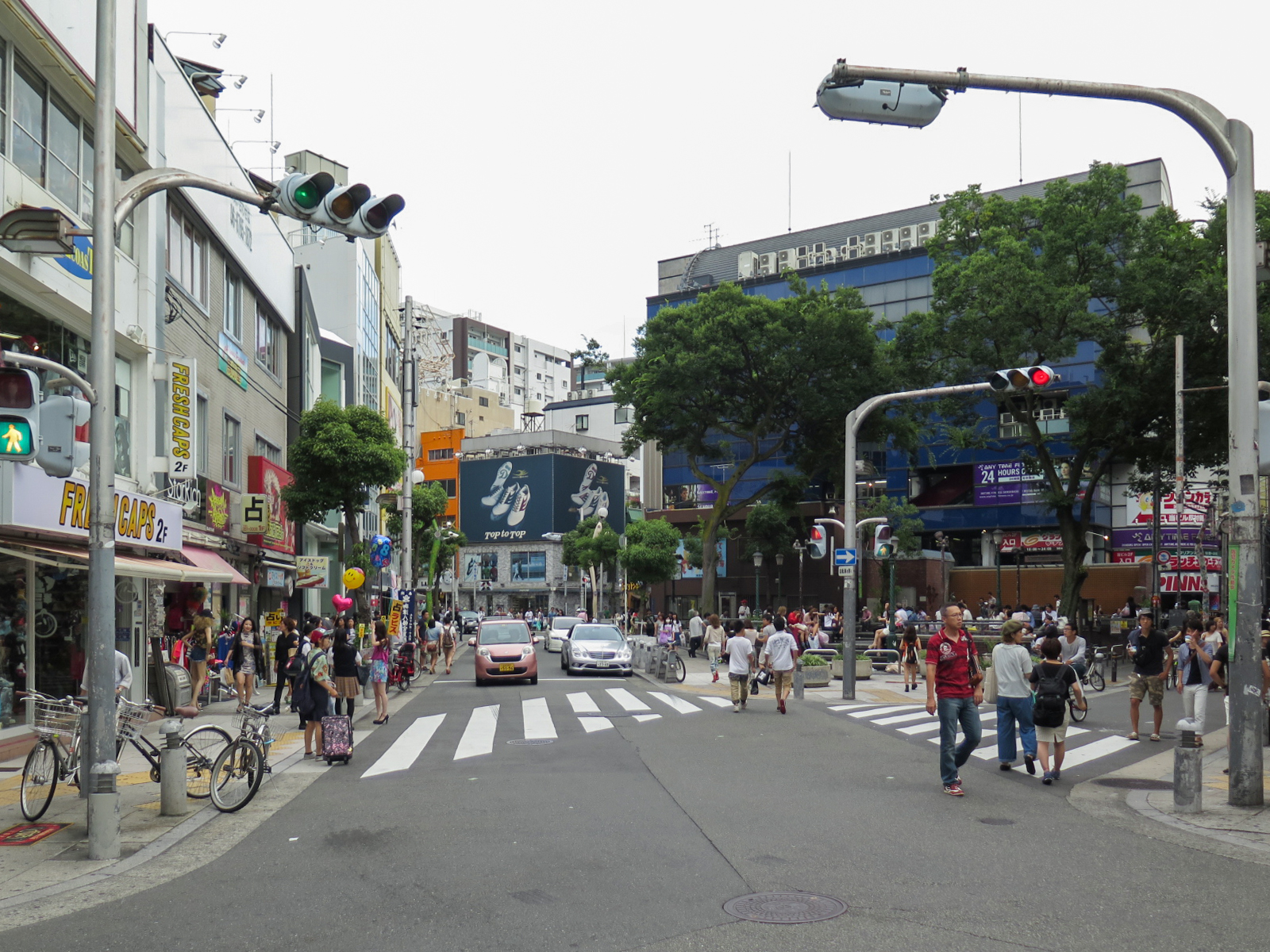
Amerikamura in Chuo-ku

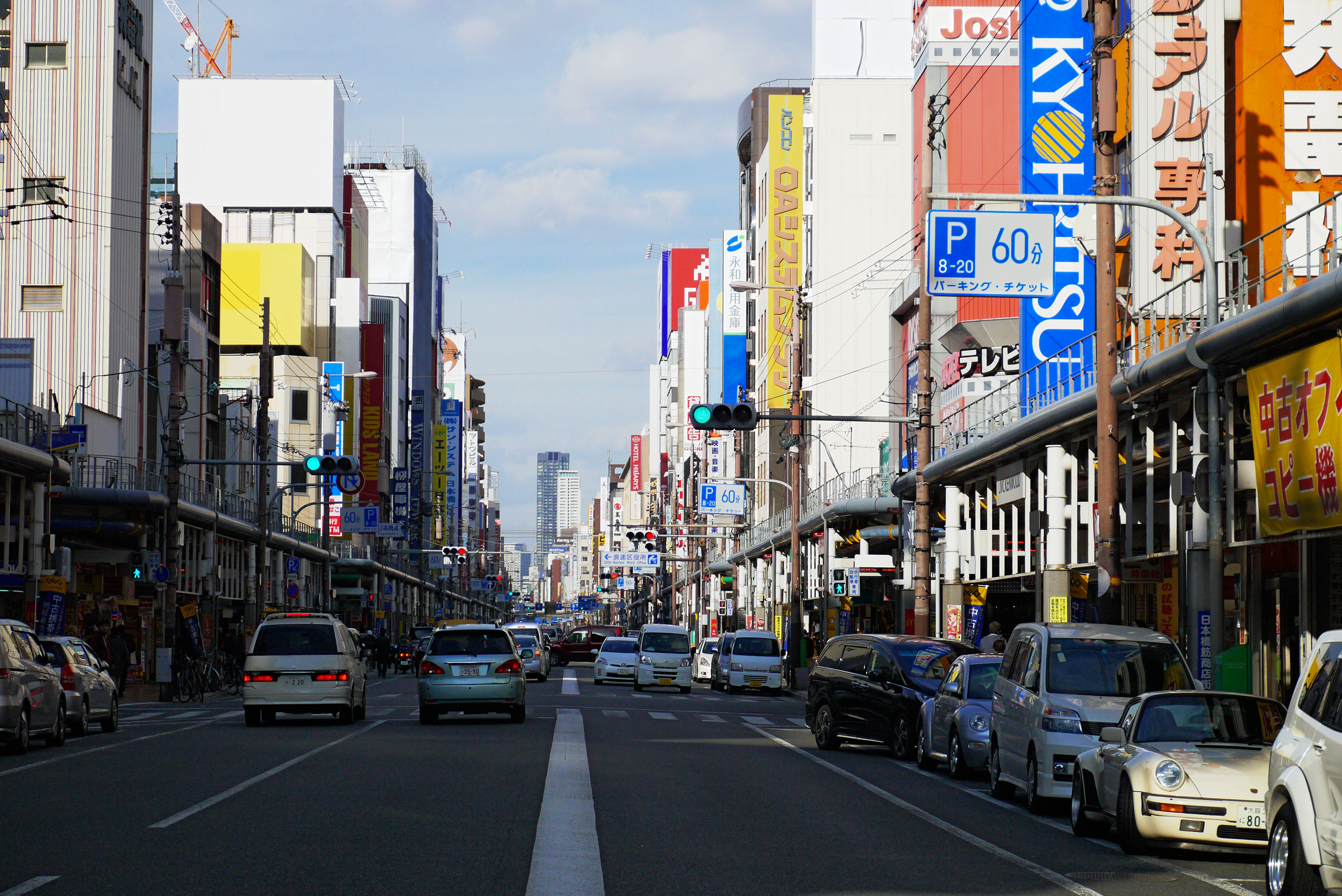
Nipponbashi in Naniwa-ku

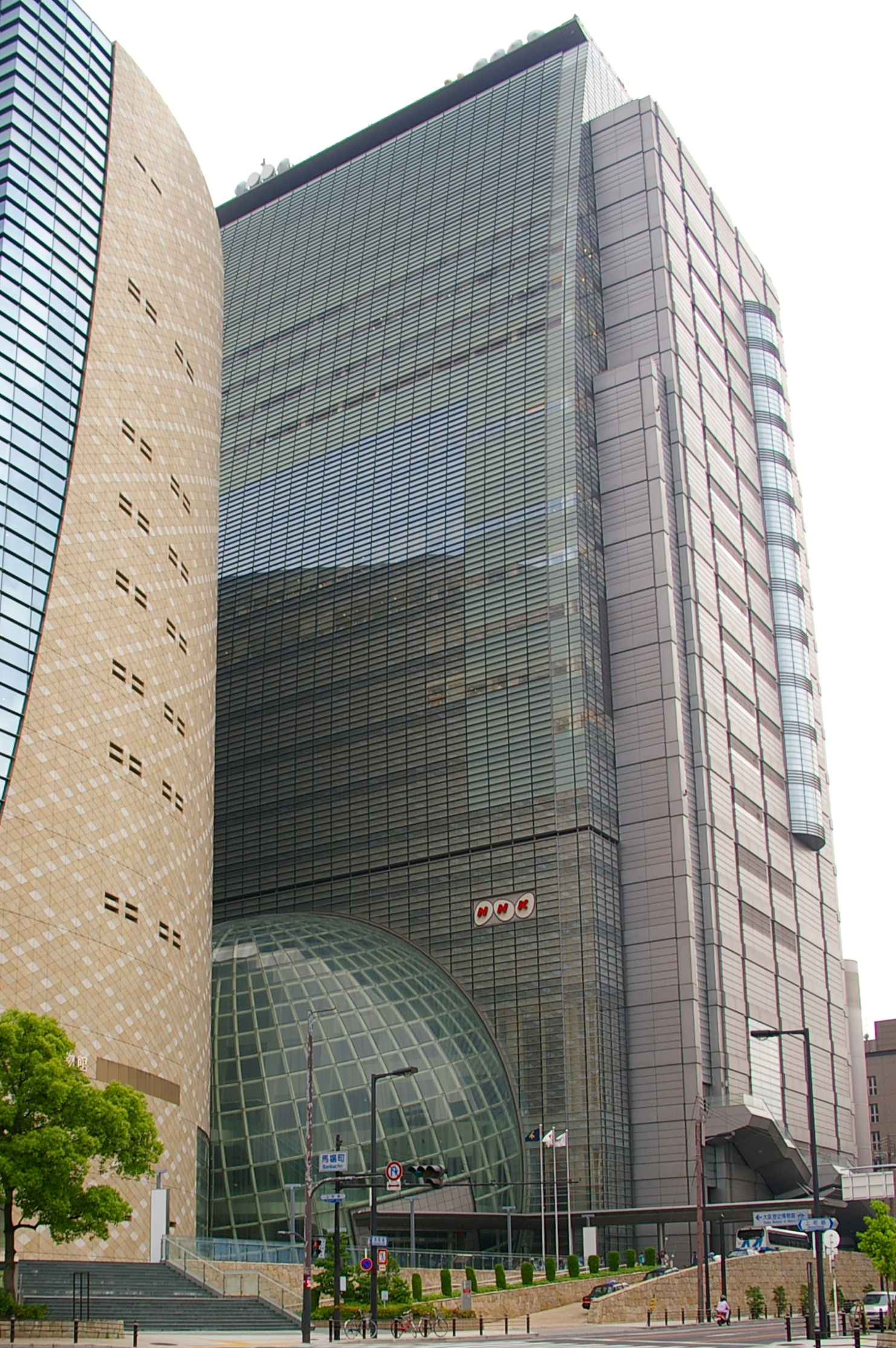
NHK Osaka

=== Shopping and food ===
Osaka has a large number of wholesalers and retail shops: 25,228 and 34,707 respectively in 2004. Many of them are concentrated in the wards of Chuō (10,468 shops) and Kita (6,335 shops). Types of shops vary from malls to conventional shōtengai shopping arcades, built both above- and underground. Shōtengai are seen across Japan, and Osaka has the longest one in the country. The Tenjinbashi-suji arcade stretches from the road approaching the Tenmangū shrine and continues for 2.6 km (1.6 miles) going north to south. The stores along the arcade include commodities, clothing, and catering outlets.

Other shopping areas include Den Den Town, the electronic and manga/anime district, which is comparable to Akihabara in Tokyo, the Umeda district, which has the Hankyu Sanbangai shopping mall and Yodobashi Camera, a huge electrical appliance store that offers a vast range of fashion stores, restaurants, and a Shonen Jump store. Osaka is known for its food, in Japan and abroad. Author Michael Booth and food critic François Simon of Le Figaro have suggested that Osaka is the food capital of the world.

Osakans' love for the culinary is made apparent in the old saying "Kyotoites are financially ruined by overspending on clothing, Osakans are ruined by spending on food." Regional cuisine includes okonomiyaki (お好み焼き; pan-fried batter cake), takoyaki (たこ焼き; octopus in fried batter), udon (うどん; a noodle dish), as well as the traditional oshizushi (押し寿司; pressed sushi), particularly battera (バッテラ; pressed mackerel sushi). Osaka is known for its fine sake, which is made with fresh water from the prefecture's mountains.

Osaka's culinary prevalence is the result of regional access to high-quality ingredients, a high population of merchants, and proximity to the ocean and waterway trade. In recent years, Osaka has started to garner more attention from foreigners with the increased popularity of cooking and dining in popular culture.

Other shopping districts include:

- American Village (Amerika-mura or "Ame-mura") – fashion for young people
- Dōtonbori – part of Namba district and considered heart of the city
- Namba – main shopping, sightseeing, and restaurant area
- Shinsaibashi – luxury goods and department stores
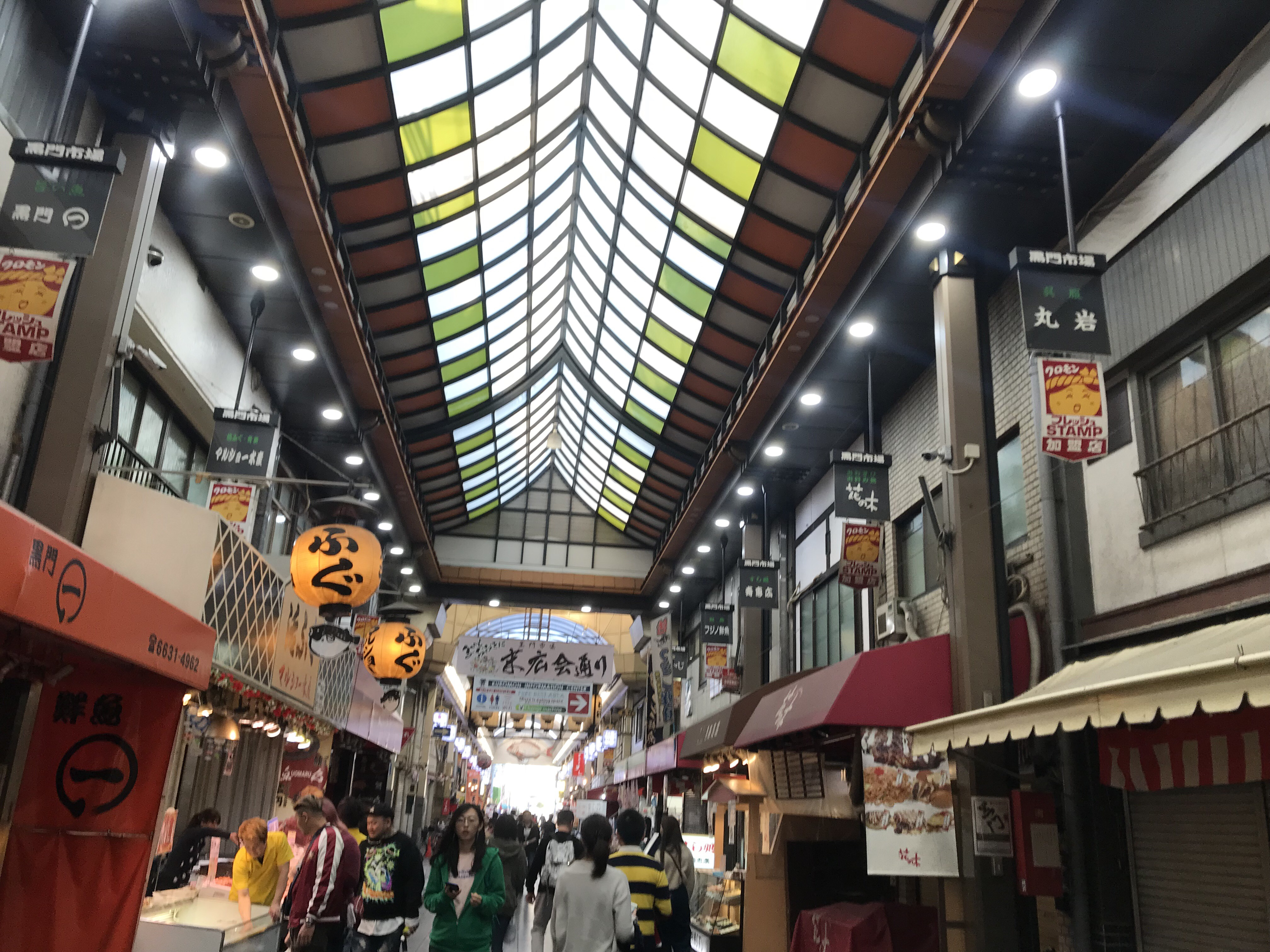
- Osaka market
  Umeda – theaters, boutiques, and department stores near the train station

=== Entertainment and performing arts ===
- Osaka is home to the National Bunraku Theater, where traditional puppet plays, bunraku, are performed.
- At Osaka Shochiku-za, close to Namba station, kabuki can be enjoyed as well as manzai.
- At Shin Kabuki-za, formerly near Namba and now near Uehommachi area, enka concerts and Japanese dramas are performed.
- Yoshimoto Kogyo, a Japanese entertainment conglomerate operates a hall in the city for manzai and other comedy shows: the Namba Grand Kagetsu hall.
- The Hanjō-tei opened in 2006, dedicated to rakugo. The theater is in the Ōsaka Tenman-gū area.
- Umeda Arts Theater opened in 2005 after relocating from its former 46-year-old Umeda Koma Theater. The theater has a main hall with 1,905 seats and a smaller theater-drama hall with 898 seats. Umeda Arts Theater stages various type of performances including musicals, music concerts, dramas, rakugo, and others.
- The Symphony Hall, built in 1982, is the first hall in Japan designed specially for classical music concerts. The Hall was opened with a concert by the Osaka Philharmonic Orchestra, which is based in the city. Orchestras such as the Berlin Philharmonic and Vienna Philharmonic have played here during their world tours as well.
- Osaka-jō Hall is a multi-purpose arena in Osaka-jō park with a capacity for up to 16,000 people. The hall has hosted numerous events and concerts including both Japanese and international artists.
- Nearby City Hall in Nakanoshima Park, is Osaka Central Public Hall, a Neo-Renaissance-style building first opened in 1918. Re-opened in 2002 after major renovation, it serves as a multi-purpose rental facility for citizen events.
- The Osaka Shiki Theater is one of the nine private halls operated nationwide by the Shiki Theater, staging straight plays and musicals.
- Festival Hall was a hall hosting various performances including noh, kyōgen, kabuki, ballets as well as classic concerts. The Bolshoi Ballet and the Philharmonia are among the many that were welcomed on stage in the past. The hall has closed at the end of 2008, planned to re-open in 2013 in a new facility.

=== Annual festivals ===
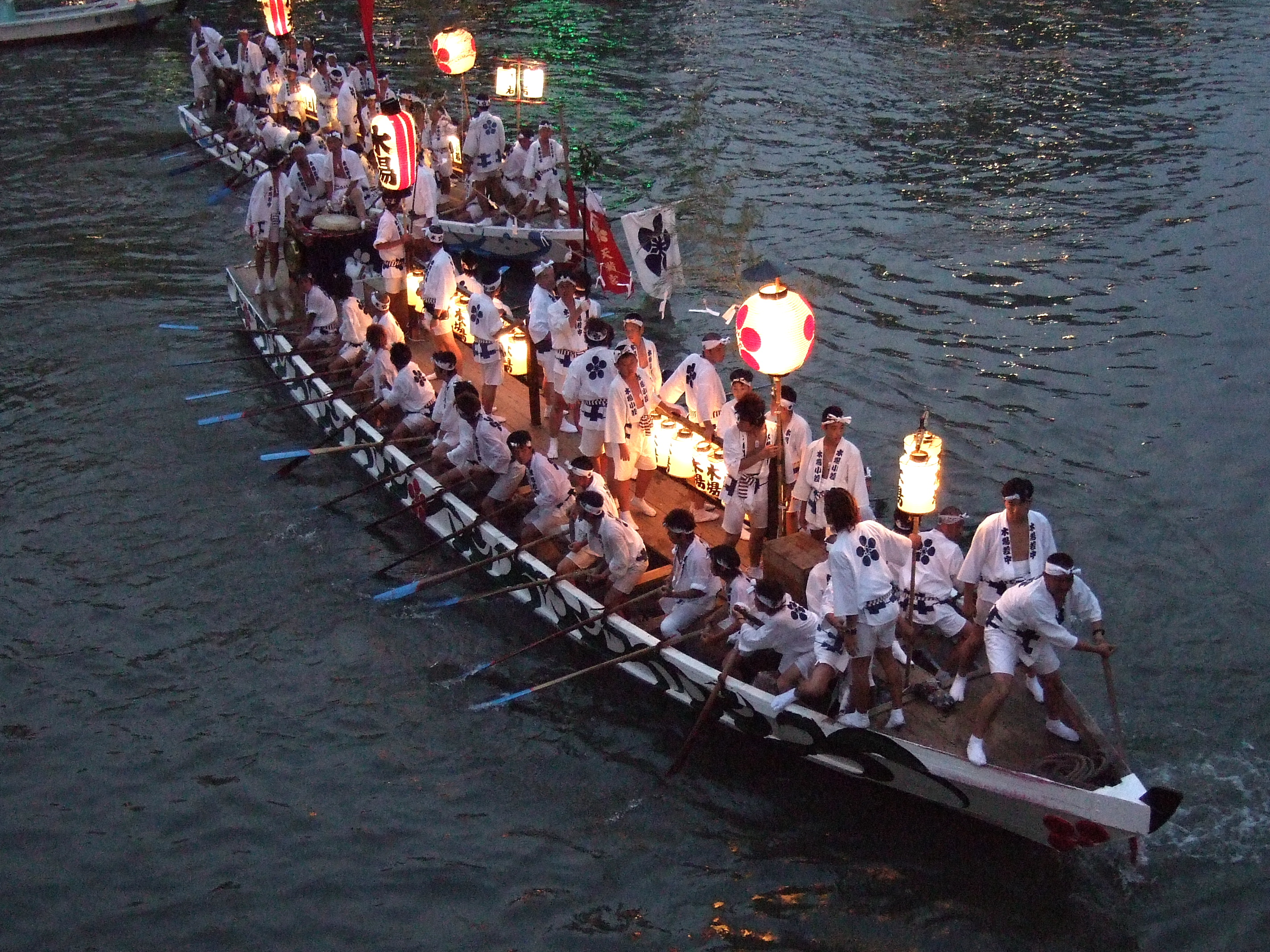
Tenjin Matsuri

One of the most famous festivals held in Osaka, the Tenjin Matsuri, is held on July 24 and 25 (Osaka Tenmangū). Other festivals in Osaka include the Aizen Matsuri (June 30 – July 2, Shōman-in Temple), the Sumiyoshi Matsuri (July 30 – August 1, Sumiyoshi Taisha), Shōryō-e (April 22, Shitennō-ji) and Tōka-Ebisu (January 9–10, Imamiya Ebisu Jinja). The annual Osaka Asian Film Festival takes place in Osaka every March while the Midosuji Parade takes place in October.

=== Museums and galleries ===
The National Museum of Art (NMAO) is a subterranean Japanese and international art museum, housing mainly collections from the post-war era and regularly welcoming temporary exhibitions. Osaka Science Museum is in a five storied building next to the National Museum of Art, with a planetarium and an OMNIMAX theater. The Museum of Oriental Ceramics holds more than 2,000 pieces of ceramics, from China, Korea, Japan and Vietnam, featuring displays of some of their Korean celadon under natural light. Osaka Municipal Museum of Art is inside Tennōji Park, housing over 8,000 pieces of Japanese and Chinese paintings and sculptures. The Osaka Museum of History, opened in 2001, is located in a 13-story modern building providing a view of Osaka Castle. Its exhibits cover the history of Osaka from pre-history to the present day. Osaka Museum of Natural History houses a collection related to natural history and life.

=== Sports ===
Osaka hosts four professional sport teams: one of them is the Orix Buffaloes, a Nippon Professional Baseball team, playing its home games at Kyocera Dome Osaka. Another baseball team, the Hanshin Tigers, although based in Nishinomiya, Hyōgo, plays a part of its home games in Kyocera Dome Osaka as well, when their homeground Koshien Stadium is occupied with the annual National High School Baseball Championship games during summer season.

There are two J.League clubs, Gamba Osaka, plays its home games at Suita City Football Stadium. Another club Cerezo Osaka, plays its home games at Yanmar Stadium Nagai. The city is home to Osaka Evessa, a basketball team that plays in the B.League. Evessa has won the first three championships of the league since its establishment. Kintetsu Liners, a rugby union team, play in the Top League. After winning promotion in 2008–09, they will again remain in the competition for the 2009–10 season. Their base is the Hanazono Rugby Stadium.

The Haru Basho (春場所; "Spring Tournament"), one of the six regular tournaments of professional sumo, is held annually in Osaka at Osaka Prefectural Gymnasium.

Another major annual sporting event that takes place in Osaka is Osaka International Ladies Marathon. Held usually at the end of January every year, the 42.195 km (26.219-mile) race starts from Nagai Stadium, runs through Nakanoshima, Midōsuji and Osaka Castle park, and returns to the stadium. Another yearly event held at Nagai Stadium is the Osaka Gran Prix Athletics games operated by the International Association of Athletics Federations (IAAF) in May. The Osaka GP is the only IAAF games annually held in Japan.

Osaka made the bid for the 2008 Summer Olympics and the 2008 Summer Paralympics but was eliminated in the first round of voting on July 13, 2001, which awarded both games to Beijing.

Osaka was one of the host cities of the official Women's Volleyball World Championship for its 1998, 2006 and 2010 editions.

Osaka is the home of the 2011 created Japan Bandy Federation and the introduction of bandy, in the form of rink bandy, was made in the city. In July 2012 the first Japan Bandy Festival was organized.

=== Media ===
Osaka serves as one of the media hubs for Japan, housing headquarters of many media-related companies. Abundant television production takes place in the city and every nationwide TV network (with the exception of TXN network) registers its secondary-key station in Osaka. All five nationwide newspaper majors also house their regional headquarters, and most local newspapers nationwide have branches in Osaka. However major film productions are uncommon in the city. Most major films are produced in nearby Kyoto or in Tokyo. The Ad Council Japan was founded in 1971 is based in Osaka, now it is the Osaka branch.

==== Newspapers ====
All five major national newspapers of Japan, The Asahi Shimbun, Mainichi Shimbun, Nihon Keizai Shimbun, Sankei Shimbun and Yomiuri Shimbun, have their regional headquarters in Osaka and issue their regional editions. Furthermore, Osaka houses Osaka Nichi-nichi Shimbun, its newspaper press. Other newspaper-related companies located in Osaka include the regional headquarters of FujiSankei Business i.;Houchi Shimbunsha; Nikkan Sports; Sports Nippon, and offices of Kyodo News Jiji Press; Reuters; Bloomberg L.P.

==== Broadcasting ====
The five TV networks are represented by Asahi Broadcasting Corporation (ANN), Kansai Telecasting Corporation (FNN), Mainichi Broadcasting System, Inc. (JNN), Television Osaka, Inc. (TXN) and Yomiuri Telecasting Corporation (NNN), headquartered in Osaka. NHK has also its regional station based in the city. AM Radio services are provided by NHK as well as the ABC Radio (Asahi Broadcasting Corporation), MBS Radio (Mainichi Broadcasting System, Inc.) and Radio Osaka (Osaka Broadcasting Corporation) and headquartered in the city. FM services are available from NHK, FM OSAKA, FM802 and FM Cocolo, the last providing programs in multiple languages including English.

==== Publishing companies ====
Osaka is home to many publishing companies, including Examina, Izumi Shoin, Kaihou Shuppansha, Keihanshin Elmagazine, Seibundo Shuppan, Sougensha, and Toho Shuppan.

== Education ==
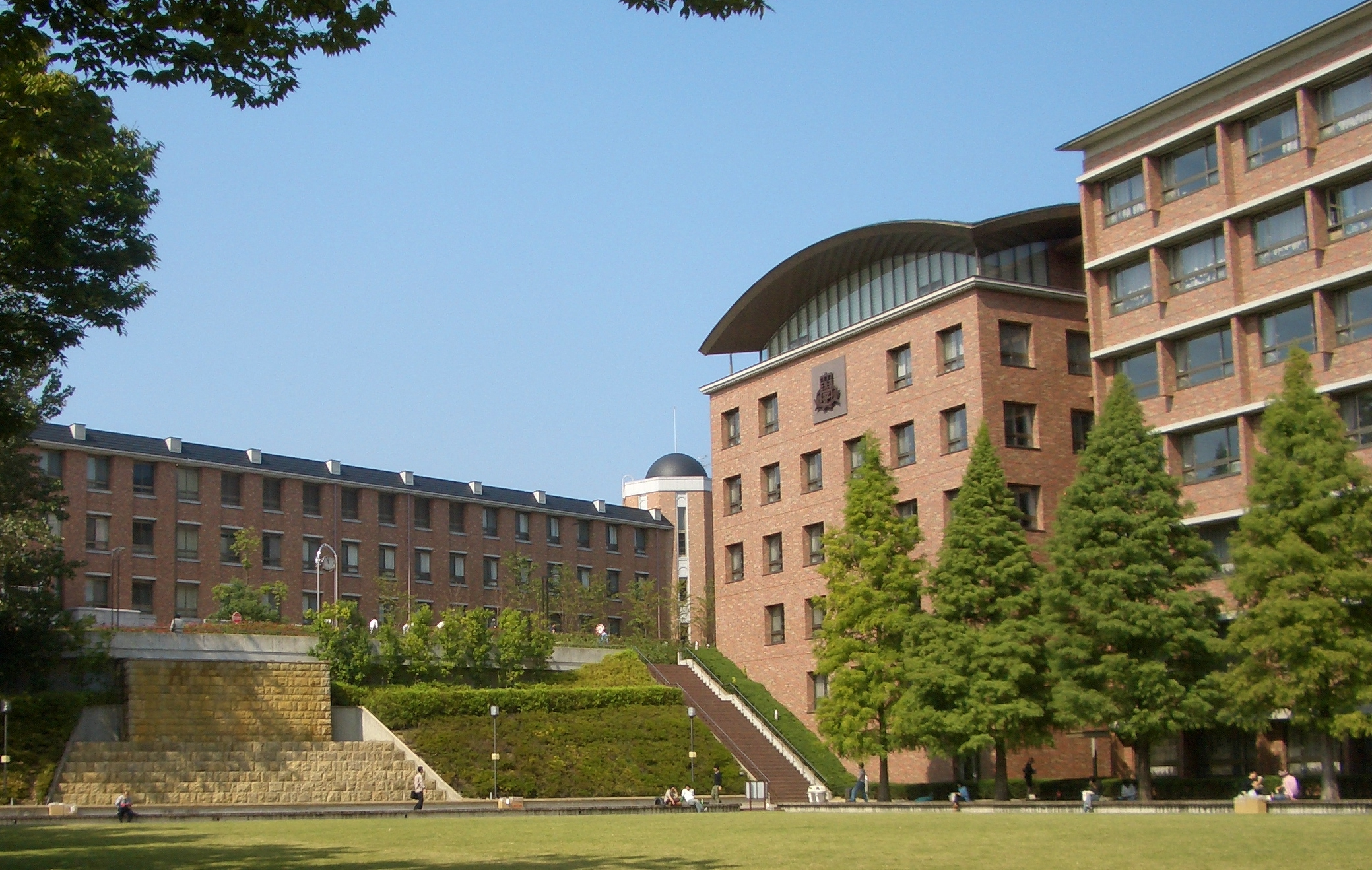
Kansai University

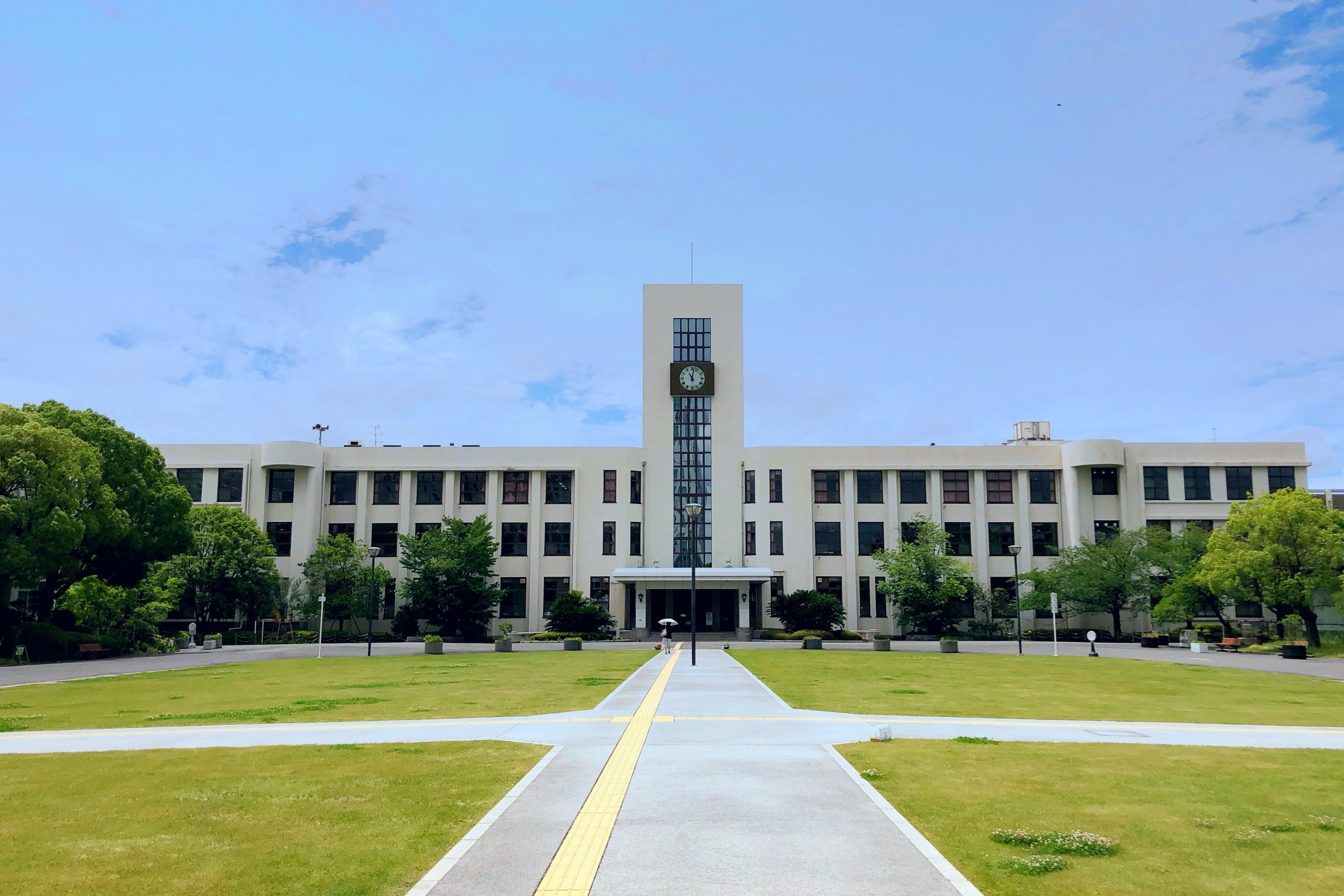
Osaka Metropolitan University

Public elementary and junior high schools in Osaka are operated by the city of Osaka. Its supervisory organization on educational matters is Osaka City Board of Education. Likewise, public high schools are operated by the Osaka Prefectural Board of Education.

Osaka once had a large number of universities and high schools, but because of growing campuses and the need for larger area, many chose to move to the suburbs, including Osaka University.

Historically foreign expatriates in the Kansai region preferred to live in Kobe rather than Osaka. As a result, until 1991 the Osaka area had no schools catering to expatriate children. Osaka International School of Kwansei Gakuin, founded in 1991, is located in nearby Minoh, and it was the first international school in the Osaka area. The Great Hanshin-Awaji earthquake of 1995 caused a decline in demand for international schools, as there were about 2,500 U.S. nationals resident in Osaka after the earthquake while the pre-earthquake number was about 5,000. American Chamber of Commerce in Japan (ACCJ) Kansai chapter president Norman Solberg stated that since 2002 the numbers of expatriates in Kansai were recovering "but the fact is there is still a persistent exodus to Tokyo." In 2001 the city of Osaka and YMCA established the Osaka YMCA International School.

Colleges and universities include:

- Kansai University
- Morinomiya University of Medical Sciences
- Osaka Metropolitan University
- Osaka University of Economics
- Osaka Institute of Technology
- Osaka Jogakuin College
- Osaka Seikei University
- Osaka University of Arts, Minamikawachi District, Osaka
- Osaka University of Comprehensive Children education
- Osaka University of Education
- Soai University
- Tokiwakai Gakuen University
- University of Osaka

=== Libraries ===
- International Institute for Children's Literature, Osaka
- Osaka Municipal Central Library
- Osaka Prefectural Nakanoshima Library

=== Learned society ===
- The Japanese Academy of Family Medicine

== Facilities ==
"Important cultural property" (重要文化財) after the name of a facility indicates an important cultural property designated by the country.

=== Leisure facilities and high-rise buildings ===
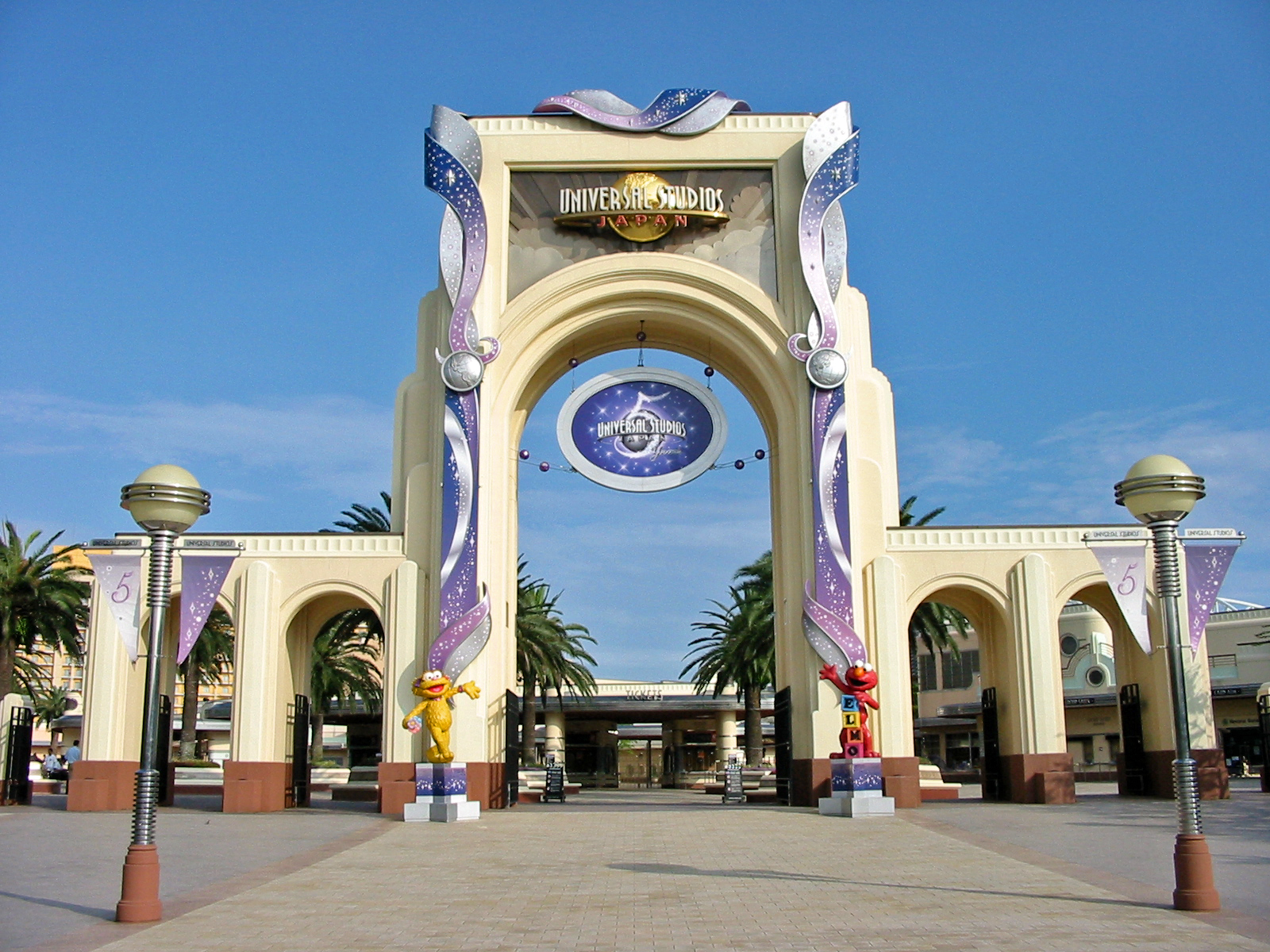
Universal Studios Japan

- Abeno Harukas
- Asia Pacific Trade Center
- Festivalgate
- Intex Osaka
- Namba Parks
- OAP Tower
- Osaka Business Park
- Osaka Garden City
- Osaka Prefectural Government Sakishima Building
- Tempozan Harbor Village
- Tsūtenkaku (Registered Tangible Cultural Property)
- Umeda Sky Building
- Universal Studios Japan

=== Historical site ===
- Hirano
- Horijo
- Kawaguchi foreign settlement
- Ruins of Naniwanomiya Palace
- Osaka Castle
- Tekijuku (important cultural property)

=== Parks and gardens ===
- Hakubo Memorial Park Tsurumi Ryokuchi
- Keitaku Garden
- Nagai Park
- Nakanoshima Park
- Ogimachi Park
- Osaka Castle Park
- Osaka Nanko Bird Sanctuary
- Sakuranomiya Park
- Shirokita Park
- Suminoe Park
- Sumiyoshi Park
- Tennoji Park
- Utsubo Park
- Yodogawa River Park
Gallery

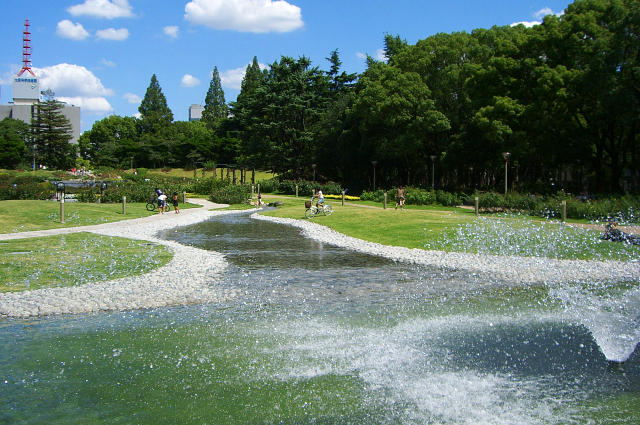
Utsubo Park

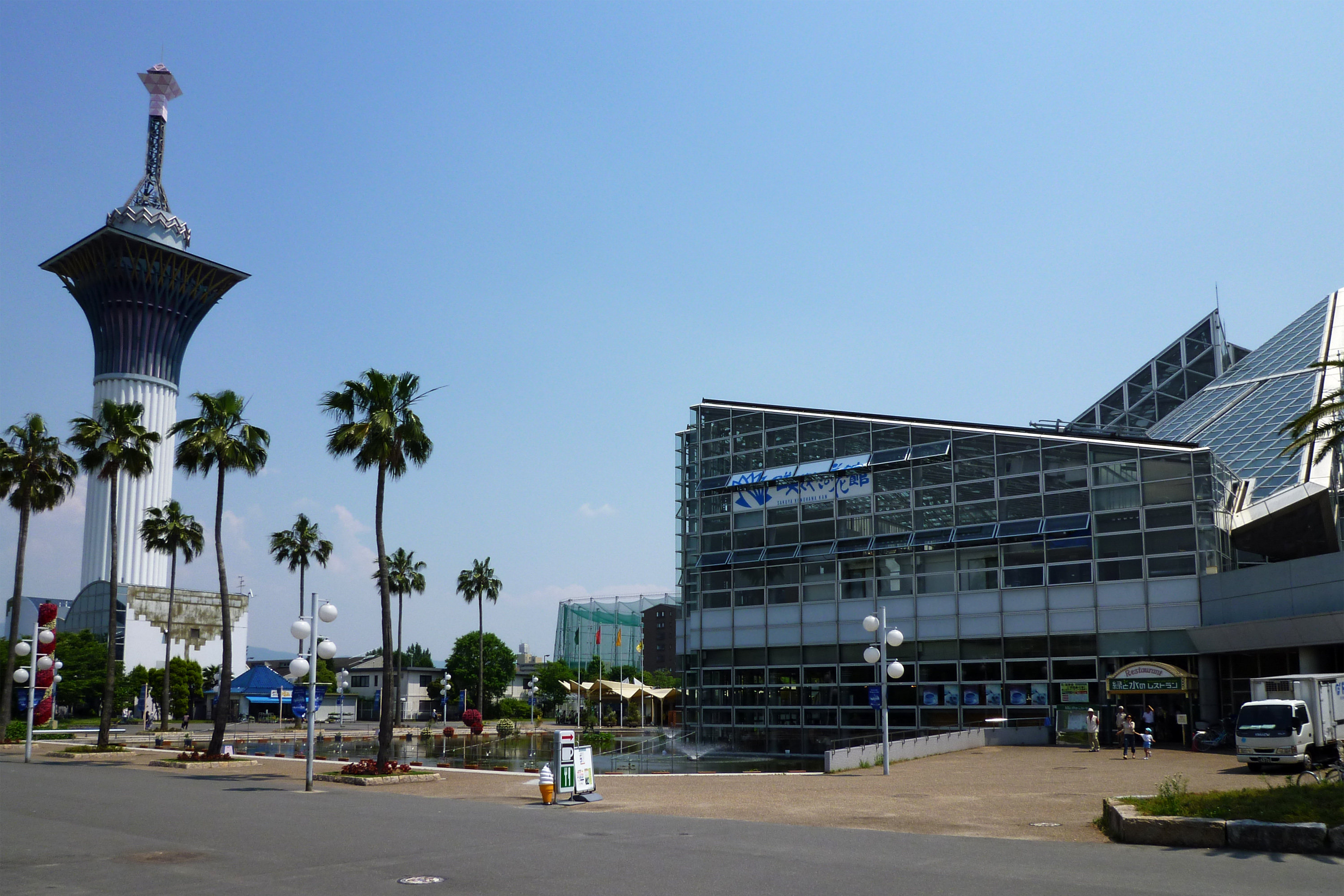
Tsurumi Ryokuchi Park

=== Ancient architecture ===
- Sumiyoshi Taisha main shrine (national treasure)

=== Modern architecture ===
- Around Umeda
- Osaka Central Post Office – Central Electric Club – Oe Building
- Nakanoshima
- Osaka City Central Public Hall (Important Cultural Property) – Osaka Prefectural Nakanoshima Library (Important Cultural Property) – Bank of Japan Osaka Branch Old Building
- Around Osaka Castle
- Old Mint Foundry Front Entrance (Former Youth Art Gallery) (Important Cultural Property) – Senpukan (Important Cultural Property) – Osaka Castle (registered tangible cultural property) – former Osaka City Museum – Osaka Prefectural Government Office
- Kitasenba, Minamisenba
- Kitahama Retro Building (Registered Tangible Cultural Property) – Osaka Securities Exchange – Sumitomo Mitsui Banking Osaka (Sumitomo Building) – Arai Building (Registration Tangible Cultural Property) – Osaka Municipal Aizuku Kindergarten (Important Cultural Property) – Nippon Life Insurance Head Office Building – Osaka Club (registered tangible cultural property) – Sumitomo Mitsui Bank Osaka Central Branch – Koraibashi Nomura Building – Nippon Christian Church Naniwa Church – Aoyama Building (Registered Tangible Cultural property) – Fushimi Building (registered tangible cultural property) – former Konishi Gisuke store building (important cultural property) – Osaka Gas Building (registered tangible cultural property) – Ikoma Building (registered tangible cultural property) – Cotton Industry Hall (Important Cultural Property) – Meidi-Ya building – Miki Musical Instrument Headquarters (Registered Tangible Cultural Properties) – Harada Industry
- Shimojoba (Nishisenba)
- Japanese Christian Church Osaka Church (registered tangible cultural property) – Yamauchi Building (registered tangible cultural property) – Edobori Kodama Building (registered tangible cultural property)
- Shinsaibashi/Namba
  - Daimaru Shinsaibashi – Takashimaya Osaka (Nankai Namba) – Takashimaya East Annex – Miki Instruments Main Store Kaiseikan (registered tangible cultural property)
- Osaka Port/Kawaguchi
- Tsuki Port Red Brick Warehouse – Sumitomo Warehouse Tsuki Port – MOL Mitsui Tsuki Port Building (Osaka Merchant Ship) – Japan Anglican Church Kawaguchi Christian Church (Registered Tangible Cultural Property) – Mitsui Warehouse – Osaka Municipal Transportation Bureau (Osaka City Electricity Bureau)

=== Theaters and halls ===
- Izumi Hall
- Umeda Arts Theater
- Morinomiya Piloti Hall
- NHK Osaka Hall
- Osaka City Central Public Hall
- Osaka International Convention Center
- Osaka Shiki Theater
- Osaka Castle Music Hall
- Osaka-jō Hall
- Orix Theater
- National Bunraku Theatre
- The Symphony Hall
- Theater BRAVA!
- New Kabukiza
- Zepp Namba
- Zepp Osaka Bayside
- Tenma Tenjin Hanjotei
- Namba Grand Kagetsu
- Festival Hall, Osaka
Gallery

Osaka City Central Public Hall

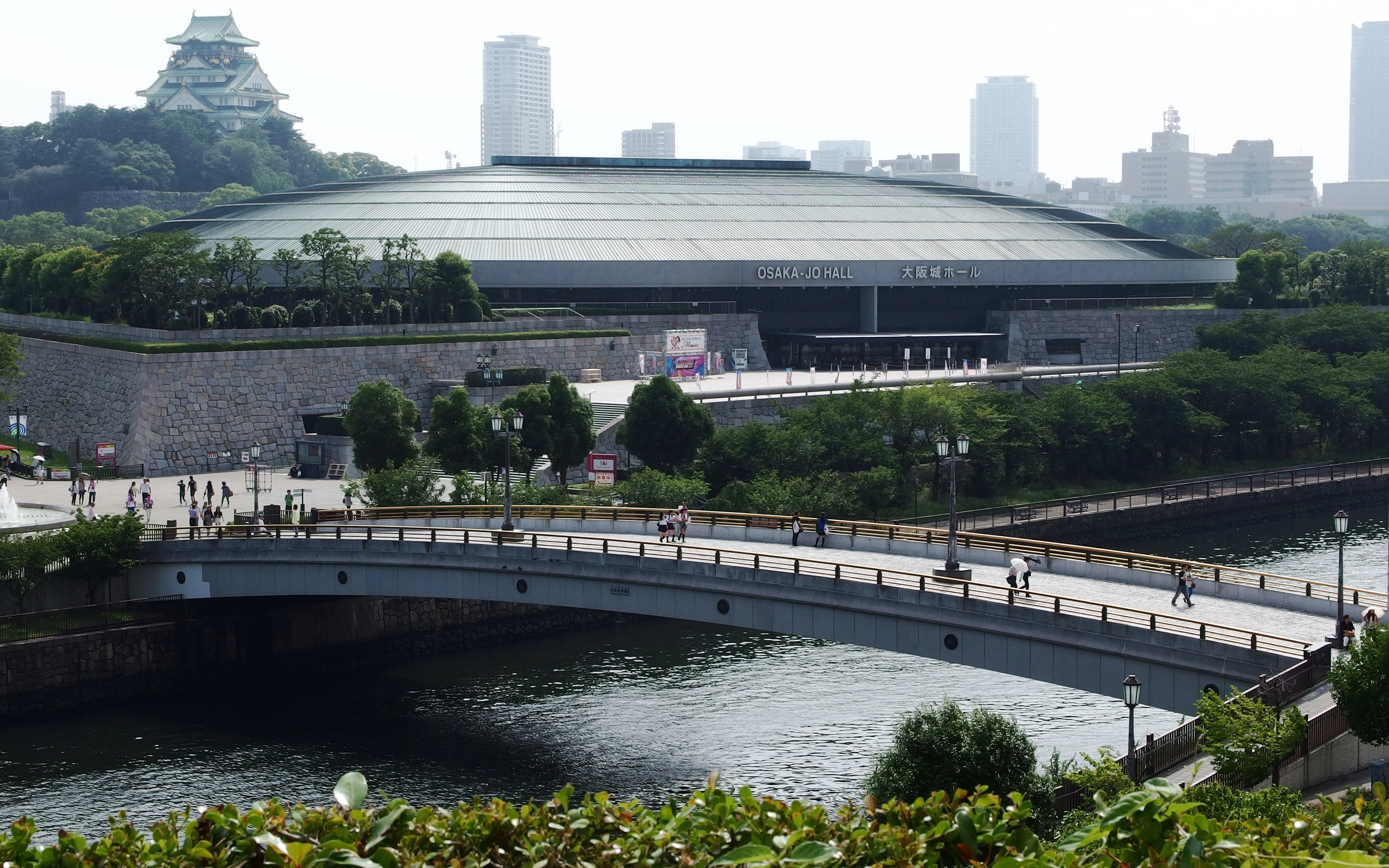
Osaka-jō Hall

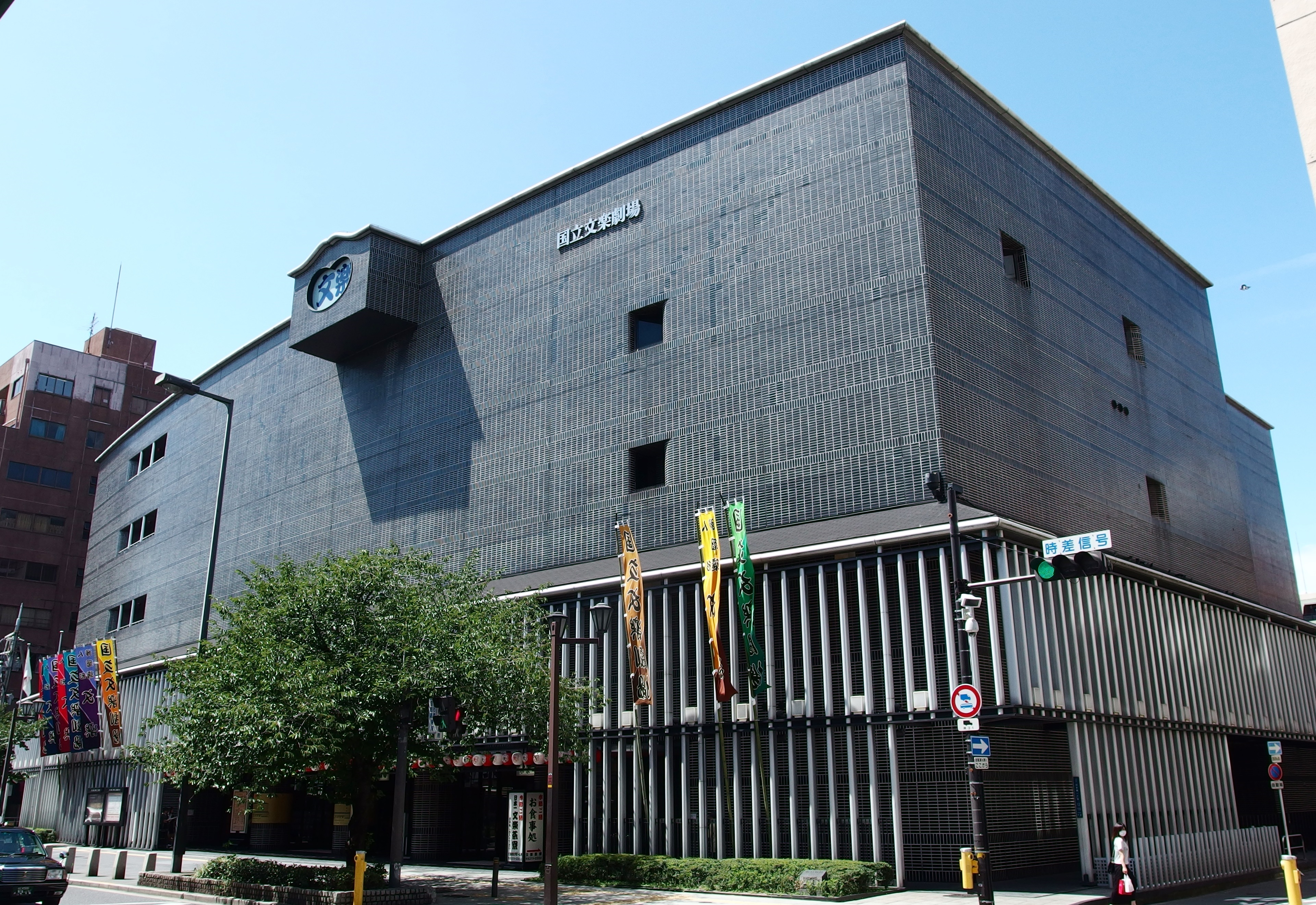
National Bunraku Theater

=== Sport venues ===
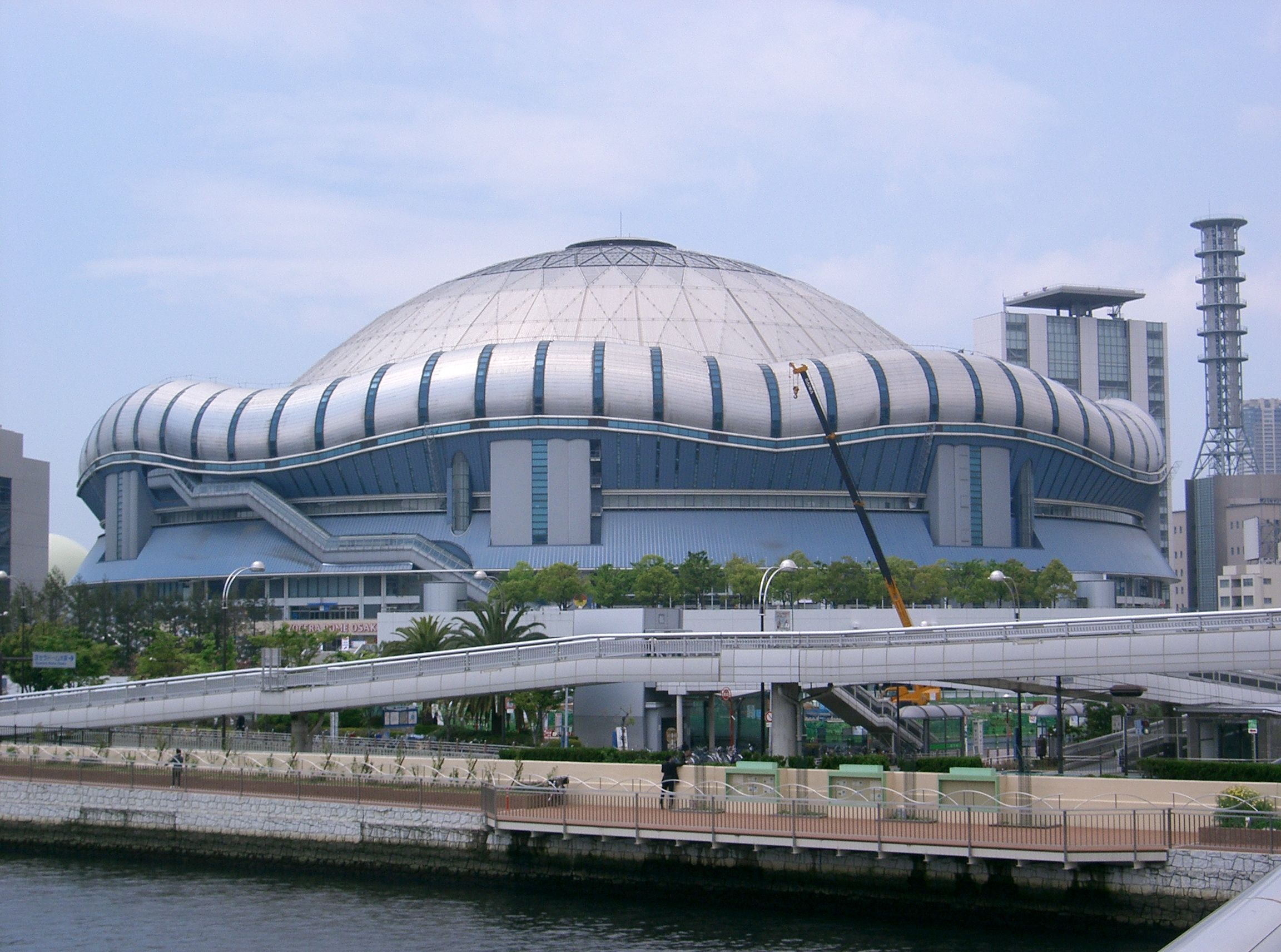
Kyocera Dome Osaka

- Ogimachi Pool
- Osaka Municipal Central Gymnasium
- Osaka Prefectural Gymnasium
- Maruzen Intec Osaka Pool
- Kyocera Dome Osaka
- Nagai Park
- Yanmar Stadium Nagai
- Yanmar Field Nagai
- Yodoko Sakura Stadium
- Maishima Sports Island

=== Religious facilities ===
Shrines

- Sumiyoshi Taisha
- Osaka Tenmangu
- Goryo Shrine
- Zama Shrine
- Namba Shrine
- Ikukunitama Shrine
- Tamatsukuri Inari Shrine
- Kōzu-gū
- Mitsu Hachimangu
- Namba Yasaka Shrine
- Shinmei Shrine
- Imamiya Shrine
- Abe Seimei Shrine
- Kumata Shrine
- Tsuyunoten Shrine
- Tsunashiki Tenjin Shrine
- Asahi Shinmeisha

Temples

- Shitennō-ji
- Shitennoji Honbo Garden
- Shomanin
- Dainenbutsu-ji
- Taishokannonji
- Isshin-ji
- Taiyū-ji
- Hozenji
- Honganji Tsumura Betsuin
- Shinshu Buddhist Otani-ha Sect Namba Betsuin Temple

Churches

- United Church of Christ in Japan (UCCJ) Naniwa Church
- Grand Cathedral of the Virgin Mary of Osaka
- Japan Anglican Church
- Japan Christian Church Osaka Fukushima Church
- Japan Evangelical Lutheran Osaka Church

== International relations ==
=== Sister cities ===
Osaka is twinned with:

- Chicago, Illinois, United States (since November 1973)
- Hamburg, Germany (since May 1989)
- Lyon, Auvergne-Rhône-Alpes, France (since May 1984)
- Manchester, United Kingdom (since September 2025)
- Melbourne, Australia (since April 1978)
- Milan, Lombardy, Italy (since June 1981)
- Saint Petersburg, Russia (since August 1979)
- San Francisco, California, United States (former partnership, October 1957 – October 2018)
- São Paulo, Brazil (since October 1969)
- Shanghai, China (since April 1974)
- Toronto, Ontario, Canada (since June 1994)

=== Friendship cooperation cities ===
Osaka also cooperates with:

- Budapest, Hungary (1998)
- Busan, South Korea (2008)
- Buenos Aires, Argentina (1998)
- Dnipro, Ukraine (2022)
- Seattle, United States

=== Business partner cities ===
Osaka's business partner cities, mostly in the Asia-Pacific region, are:

- Auckland, New Zealand
- Bangkok, Thailand
- Brisbane, Queensland, Australia
- Hamburg, Germany
- Ho Chi Minh City, Vietnam
- Hong Kong, China
- Jakarta, Indonesia
- Kuala Lumpur, Malaysia
- Los Angeles, California, United States
- Manila, Philippines
- Melbourne, Australia
- Mumbai, Maharashtra, India
- Seoul, South Korea
- Shanghai, China
- Singapore
- Tianjin, China

=== Sister ports ===
Osaka's sister ports are:

- Port of Busan, South Korea
- Port of Le Havre, France
- Port of Melbourne, Australia
- Saigon Port, Vietnam
- Port of San Francisco, United States
- (China) Port of Shanghai (friendship port treaty)
- Port of Valencia, Spain
- Port of Valparaiso, Chile

== See also ==
- Expo '70
- Expo 2025
- List of metropolitan areas by population
