= Nakanoshima =

Narrow sandbank in Kita-ku, Osaka, Japan

Coordinates: 34°41′37″N 135°29′48″E

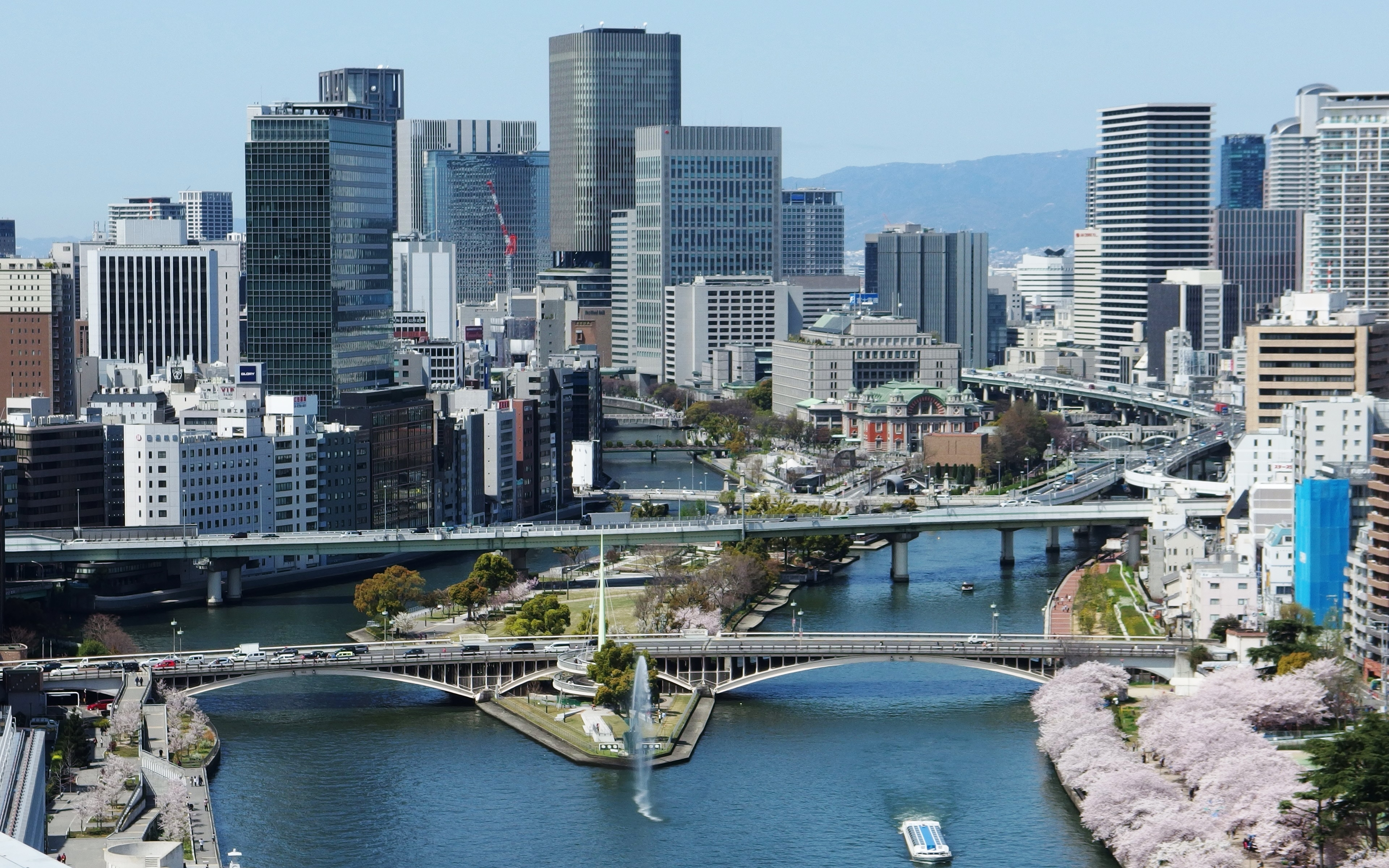
Whole view of Nakanoshima from the east in spring

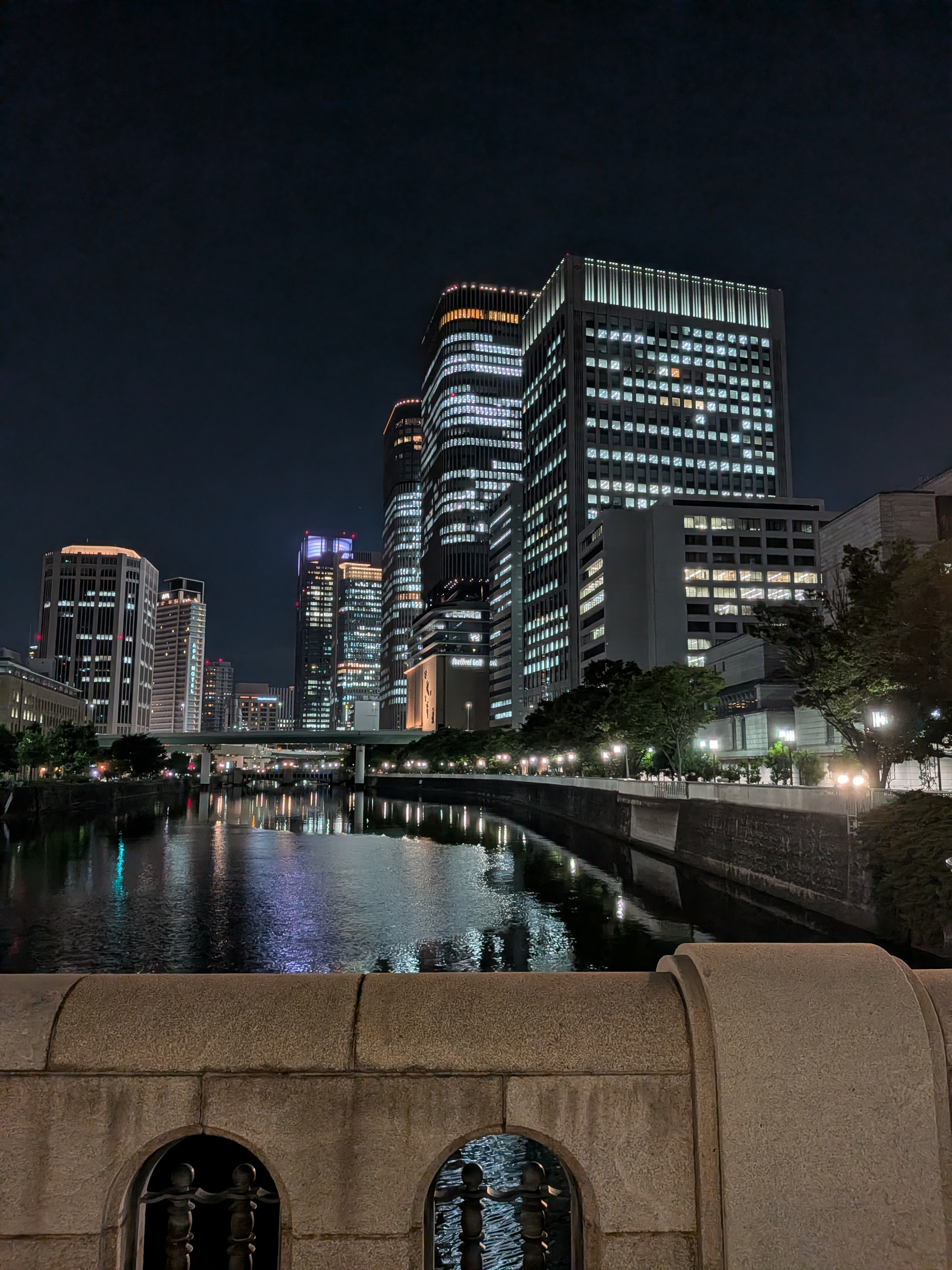
Night view of Nakanoshima

Nakanoshima (中之島) is a 3 km long and 50 hectares narrow sandbank in Kita-ku, Osaka city, Japan, that divides the Kyū-Yodo into the Tosabori and Dōjima rivers. Many governmental and commercial offices (including the city hall of Osaka), museums and other cultural facilities are located on Nakanoshima.

== History ==
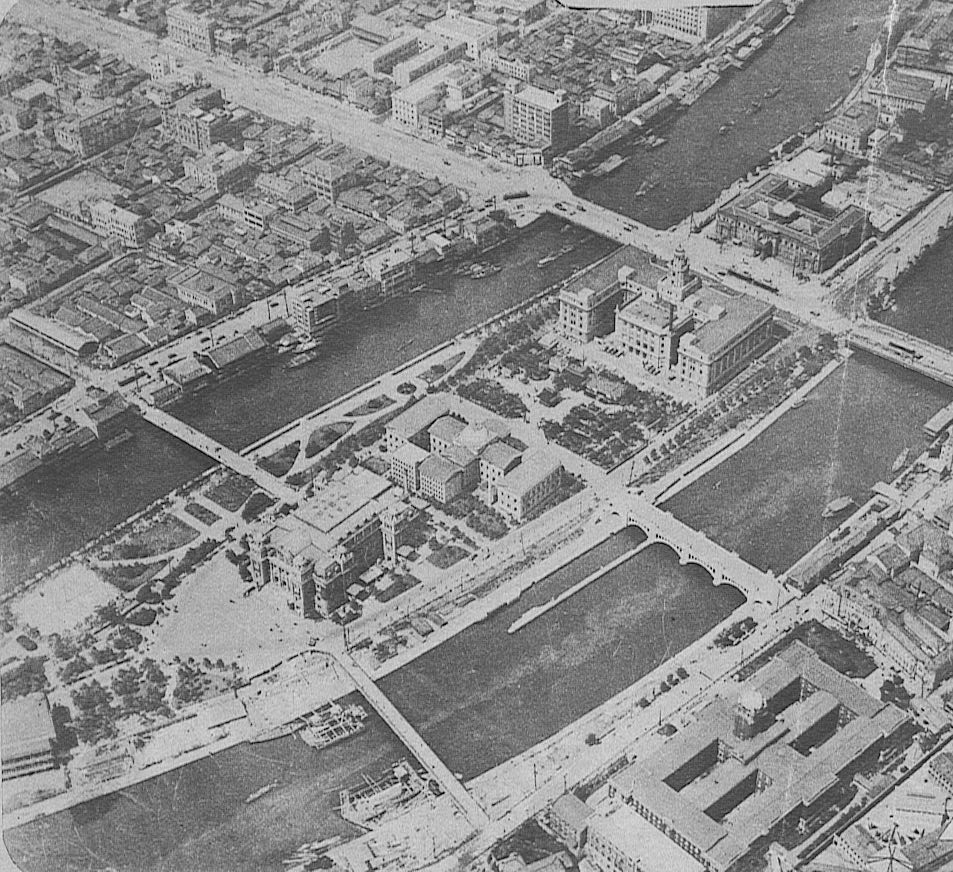
Nakanoshima and its park, part of which is seen towards the left in the central delta. The first building at the extreme left in the delta is the public hall, followed in order toward the right by the city public library, the city hall and the Osaka branch of the Bank of Japan. The street in front of the bank is part of the Midosuji Boulevard -- 1930.

== Landmarks and architecture ==
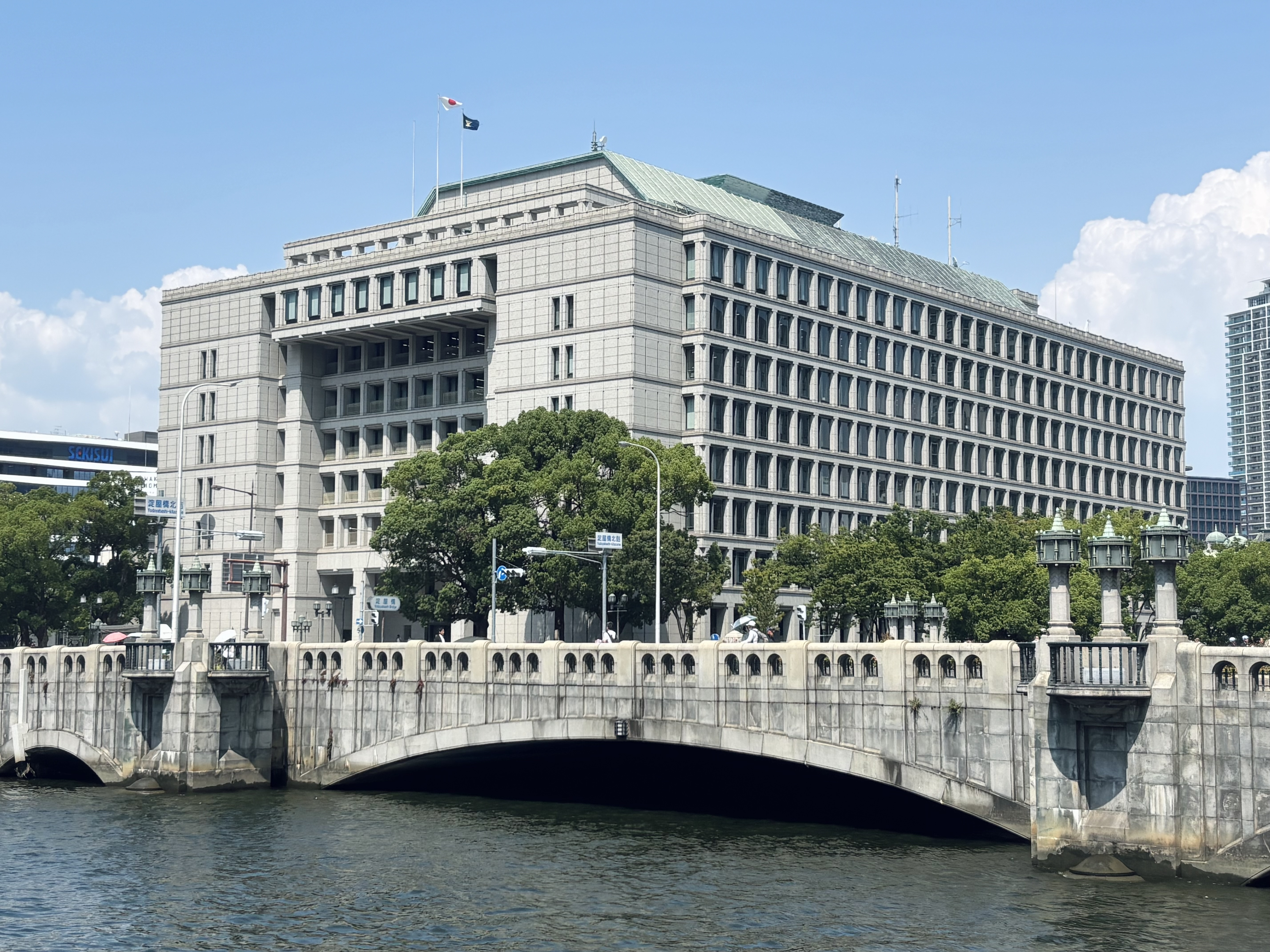
Osaka City Hall in Nakanoshima

Osaka City Central Public Hall

(from east to west)

- Nakanoshima Park
  Rose garden
- Osaka City Central Public Hall
- Nakanoshima Library
- Bank of Japan Osaka branch
- Nakanoshima Festival Tower (Headquarters of the Asahi Shimbun)
- Nakanoshima Mitsui Building
- Headquarters of Kansai Electric Power Company
- Osaka University Nakanoshima Center
- Rihga Royal Hotel
- Nakanoshima Centre Building

== Cultural facilities ==
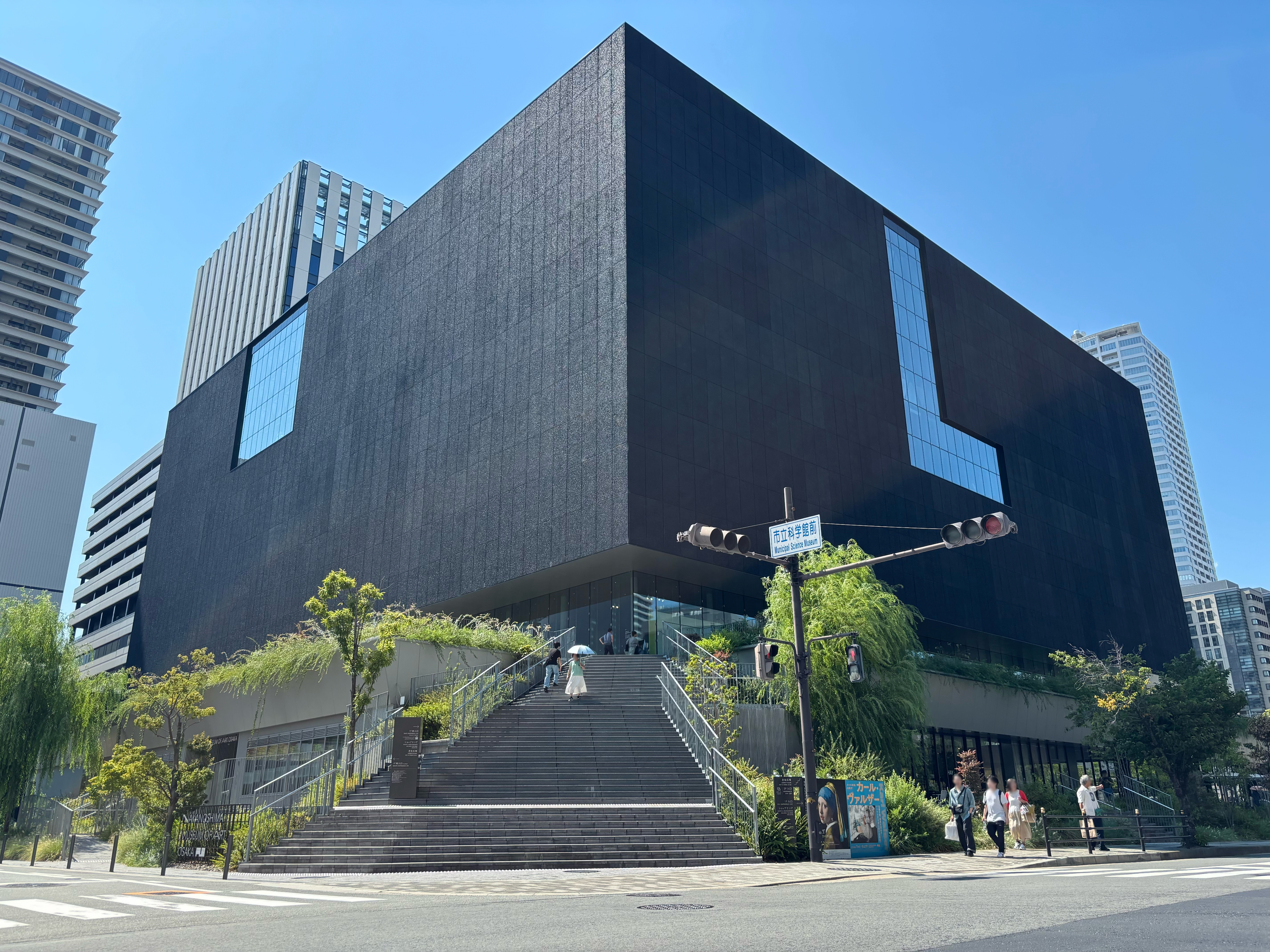
Nakanoshima Museum of Art, Osaka

(from east to west)

- Museum of Oriental Ceramics, Osaka
- Festival Hall (Nakanoshima Festival Tower East)
- National Museum of Art, Osaka
- Nakanoshima Museum of Art, Osaka
- Science Museum
- Osaka International Convention Center

== Transportation ==
=== Train ===
- Keihan Electric Railway
  - Keihan Main Line: Yodoyabashi Station, Kitahama Station
  - Nakanoshima Line: Naniwabashi Station, Ōebashi Station, Watanabebashi Station, Nakanoshima Station
- Osaka Municipal Subway
  - Midosuji Line: Yodoyabashi Station
  - Yotsubashi Line: Higobashi Station
- Hanshin Electric Railway Main Line: Fukushima Station
- JR Tōzai Line: Shin-Fukushima Station

=== Pedestrian road ===
- Nakanoshima Promenade
