= Kashima Station =

Kashima Station is the name of multiple train stations in Japan.

- Kashima Station (Fukushima) - (鹿島駅) in Fukushima Prefecture
- Kashima Station (Osaka) - (加島駅) in Osaka Prefecture

== See also ==
- Hizen-Kashima Station, on the Nagasaki Main Line in Kashima, Saga
