= Osaka City Central Public Hall =

Public building in Osaka, Japan

- 大阪市中央公会堂
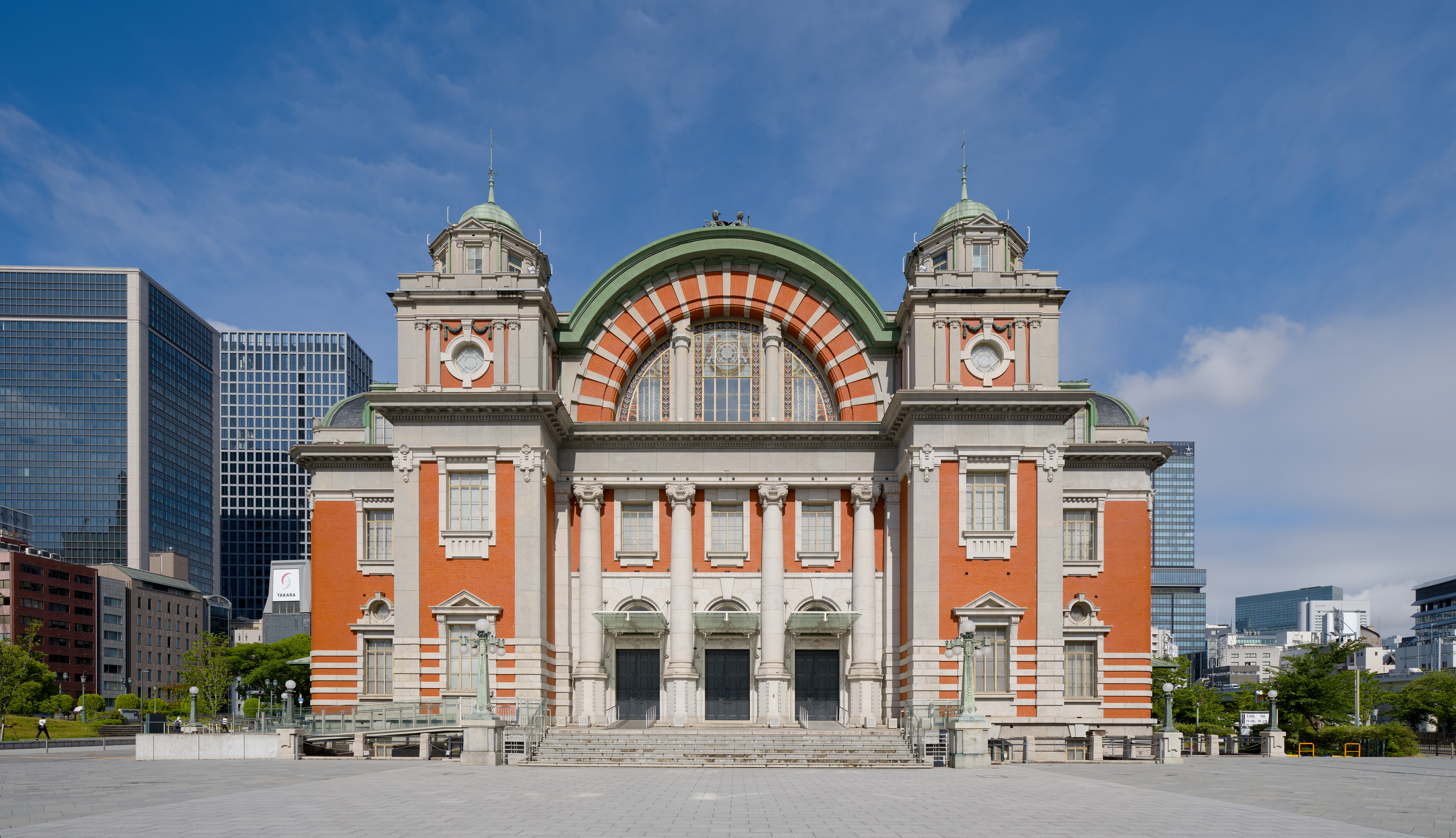
- Main facade of Osaka City Central Public Hall in 2026

- Location within Osaka Prefecture Location within Japan

General information
- Type: Public hall
- Architectural style: Renaissance Revival
- Location: Nakanoshima, Kita-ku, Osaka, Japan, 1-1-27 Nakanoshima, Kita-ku, Osaka 530-0005
- Coordinates: 34°41′37″N 135°30′14″E
- Construction started: 1913
- Completed: 1918
- Renovated: 1999–2002

Technical details
- Floor count: 3 above ground, 2 below ground
- Floor area: 9,886.56 m^{2} (106,418.0 sq ft)
- Grounds: 5,641.81 m^{2} (60,727.9 sq ft)

Design and construction
- Architects: Shinichiro Okada (original design); Kingo Tatsuno and Yasushi Kataoka (implementation design)
- Designations: National Important Cultural Property

Website
- osaka-chuokokaido.com/en/

Osaka City Central Public Hall (Japanese: 大阪市中央公会堂, Hepburn: Ōsaka-shi chūō kōkaidō) is a public building in the city of Osaka, situated on the Nakanoshima sandbank.

== History ==
The construction of the building started in 1913 and was completed by 1918. It was built following the donation of 1 million yen by Einosuke Iwamoto who was a broker, donating this money after seeing the impact of philanthropy in the United States of America. It is noted for the Renaissance Revival architecture style in which it was built. It reopened in November 2002 following extensive refurbishment since 1999, including work to make it more resistant to earthquakes. It was deemed a cultural asset of national importance in December 2002.
