= Mitejima Station =

Railway station in Osaka, Japan

Mitejima Station 御幣島
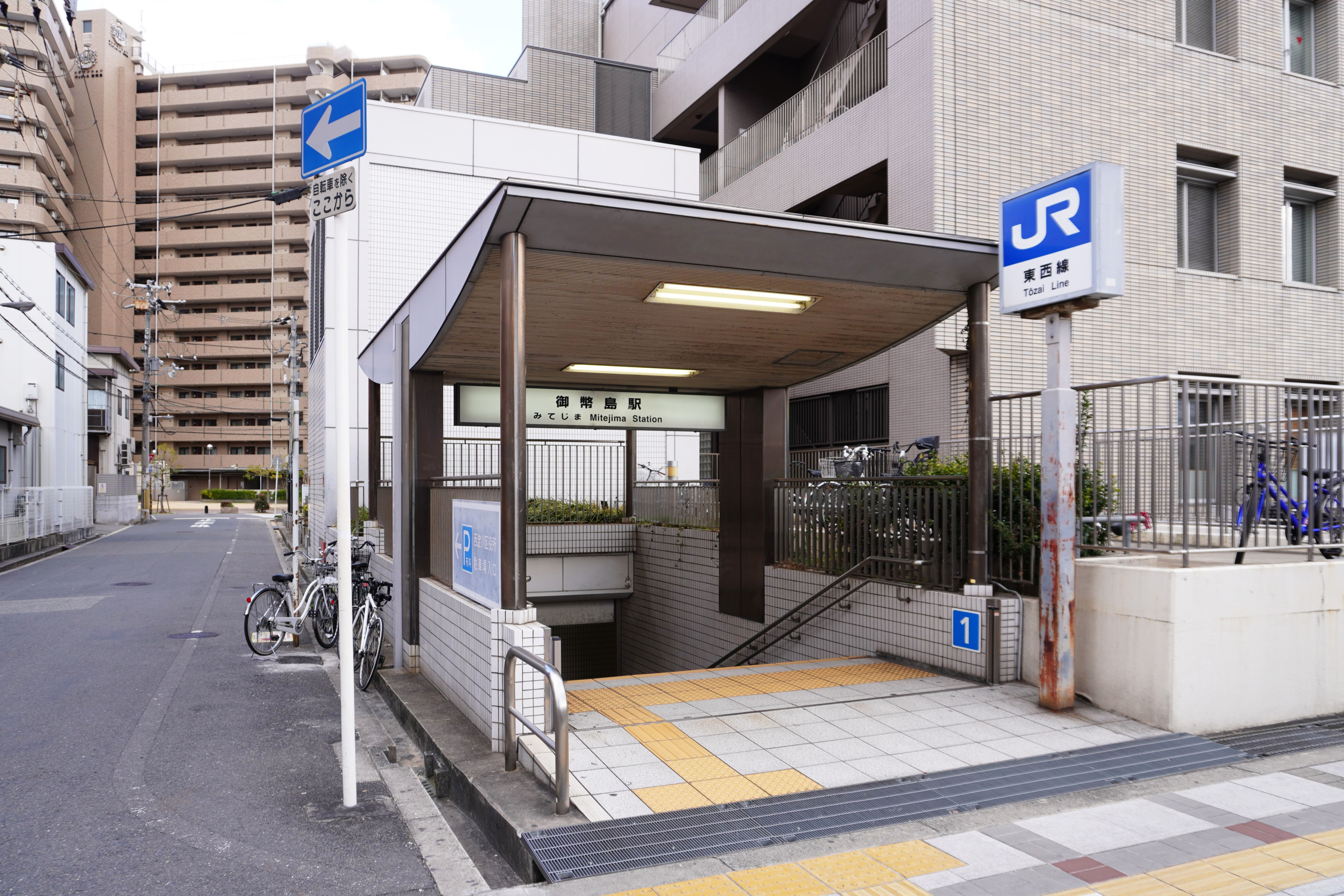
- Exit #1 in 2023

General information
- Location: 大阪市西淀川区御幣島一丁目8先; Osaka; Japan
- Coordinates: 34.7127°N 135.4558°E
- Owner: JR West
- Operator: JR West
- Manager: JR West
- Line: JR Tozai Line
- Platforms: 2
- Tracks: 2
- Train operators: JR West

Construction
- Structure type: Underground
- Parking: No
- Cycle facilities: No
- Accessible: Yes

Other information
- Station code: JR-H47

History
- Opened: 8 March 1997
Location

Mitejima Station (御幣島駅, Mitejima-eki) is a railway station on the West Japan Railway Company JR Tōzai Line in Nishiyodogawa-ku, Osaka, Osaka Prefecture, Japan.

== Layout ==
- An island platform serves two tracks on the second floor below ground.

1	■ JR Tōzai Line	for Amagasaki, Takarazuka and Sannomiya
2	■ JR Tōzai Line	for Kitashinchi, Kyobashi and Shijonawate

== History ==
Mitejima Station opened on 8 March 1997, coinciding with the opening of the JR Tōzai Line between Kyobashi and Amagasaki.

Station numbering was introduced in March 2018 with Mitejima being assigned station number JR-H47.

== Surroundings ==
- Nishiyodogawa Ward Office
- Nishiyodogawa Post Office
- Nishiyodogawa Police Station
- Nishiyodogawa Tax Office
- Nishiyodo Hospital
- Ezaki Glico
- Utajimabashi Junction (Japan National Route 2, Mitashima-suji, Yodogawa-dori)
- Mitejima-ekimae Bus Stops (Osaka Municipal Transportation Bureau)
- Utajimabashi Bus Stop (Osaka Municipal Transportation Bureau)

== Adjacent stations ==
«	Service	»
West Japan Railway Company (JR West)
JR Tōzai Line
Ebie	Local	Kashima
Ebie	Regional Rapid Service	Kashima
Ebie	Rapid Service	Kashima
