= Fukushima Station =

Fukushima Station is the name of multiple train stations in Japan:

- Fukushima Station (Fukushima) in Fukushima, Fukushima
- Fukushima Station (Osaka) in Osaka
