= Ebie Station =

Railway station in Osaka, Japan

Ebie Station 海老江
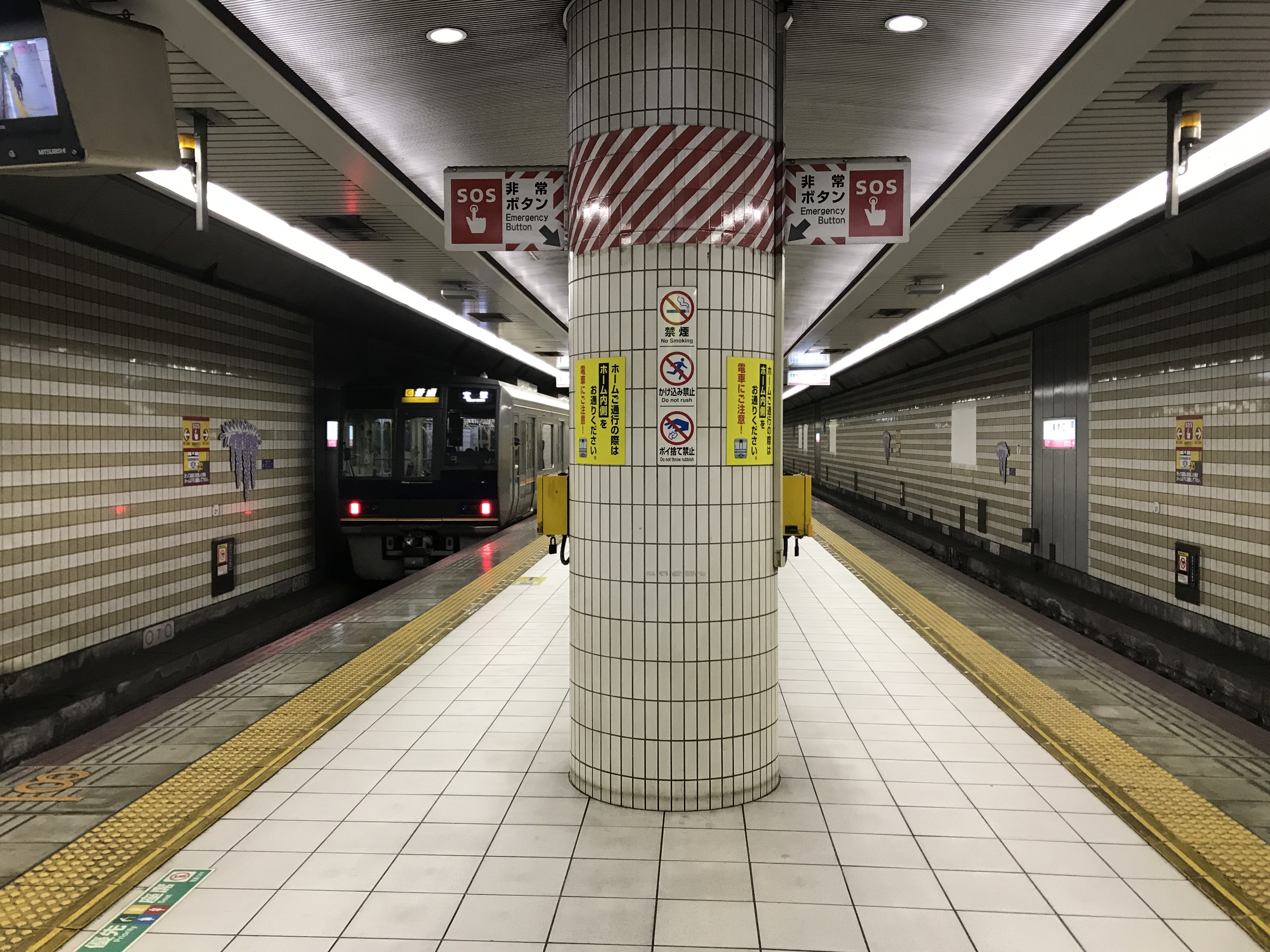

General information
- Location: 〒553-0001 大阪府大阪市福島区海老江５丁目１; Osaka; Japan
- Coordinates: 34°41′43.58″N 135°28′23.79″E
- Owner: JR West
- Operator: JR West
- Manager: JR West
- Line: Tozai Line
- Platforms: 2
- Tracks: 2
- Train operators: JR West
- Connections: Hanshin Electric Railway

Construction
- Structure type: underground
- Parking: no
- Cycle facilities: no
- Accessible: yes

Other information
- Station code: JR-H46
Location

Ebie Station (海老江駅, Ebie-eki) is a railway station on the West Japan Railway Company (JR West) JR Tōzai Line in Fukushima-ku, Osaka, Osaka Prefecture, Japan.

== Connecting lines from Ebie ==
- Hanshin Railway Main Line: Noda Station
- Osaka Metro Sennichimae Line: Nodahanshin Station (S11)

== Layout ==
- There is an island platform with two tracks on the second floor below ground.

1	■ JR Tōzai Line	for Amagasaki, Takarazuka and Sannomiya
2	■ JR Tōzai Line	for Kitashinchi, Kyobashi and Shijonawate

== Surroundings ==
- the headquarters of Hanshin Electric Railway Co., Ltd.
- WISTE

== History ==
Ebie Station opened on 8 March 1997, coinciding with the opening of the JR Tōzai Line between Kyobashi and Amagasaki.

Station numbering was introduced in March 2018 with Ebie being assigned station number JR-H46.

== Adjacent stations ==
«	Service	»
West Japan Railway Company (JR West) JR Tōzai Line
Shin-Fukushima	Local	Mitejima
Shin-Fukushima	Regional Rapid Service	Mitejima
Shin-Fukushima	Rapid Service	Mitejima
