= Fujita Art Museum =

Art museum in Osaka, Japan

Coordinates: 34.694978°N 135.525124°E

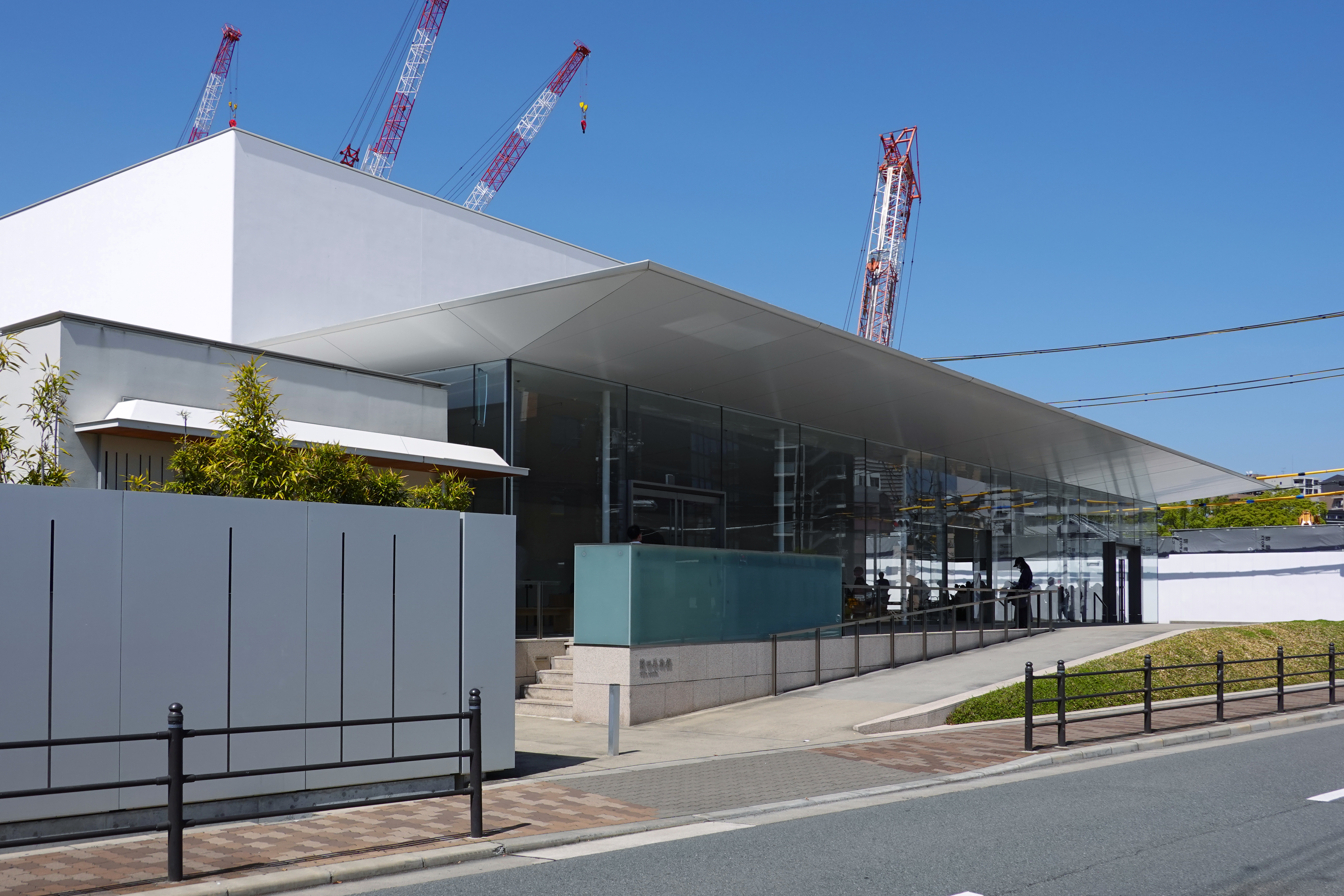
Fujita Museum

The Fujita Art Museum (藤田美術館, Fujita Bijutsukan) is one of the largest private collections in the Kansai region. The collection was assembled by Fujita Denzaburō and his descendants. It was installed in a storehouse on the family property in Osaka.

Opened to the public in 1954, the collection houses Chinese and Japanese painting, calligraphy, sculpture, ceramics, lacquer, textiles, metalwork, and Japanese tea ceremony objects.

The Japanese paintings include 13th and 14th century scrolls such as the Murasaki Shikibu Diary Emaki (National Treasure) and paintings of the 16 Rakan by Takuma Eiga. The section of Japanese ceramics, largely tea-ceremony objects, is varied and includes teabowls by Chōjirō and Nonomura Ninsei, as well as square dishes by Kōrin and Kenzan.

In March 2017, 31 objects in the collection were de-accessioned and put on auction through auction house Christie's in New York as part of New York's Asian Week 2017 event

== Access ==
- Ōsakajō-kitazume Station on the JR Tozai Line
- Osaka City Bus Katamachi Stop
  - 4 minutes from Temmabashi Station on the Keihan Railway Keihan Line and the Osaka Municipal Subway Tanimachi Line (Routes 28, 31, 46 and 110)
  - 10 minutes from Miyakojima Station on the Osaka Municipal Subway Tanimachi Line (Route 110)

== See also ==
- List of National Treasures of Japan (paintings)
- List of National Treasures of Japan (writings)
- List of National Treasures of Japan (crafts-others)
- Fujita Ram Gong - a Chinese ritual bronzes vessel formerly in the museum collection
