= Nakanoshima Museum of Art, Osaka =

Japanese museum

- 大阪中之島美術館
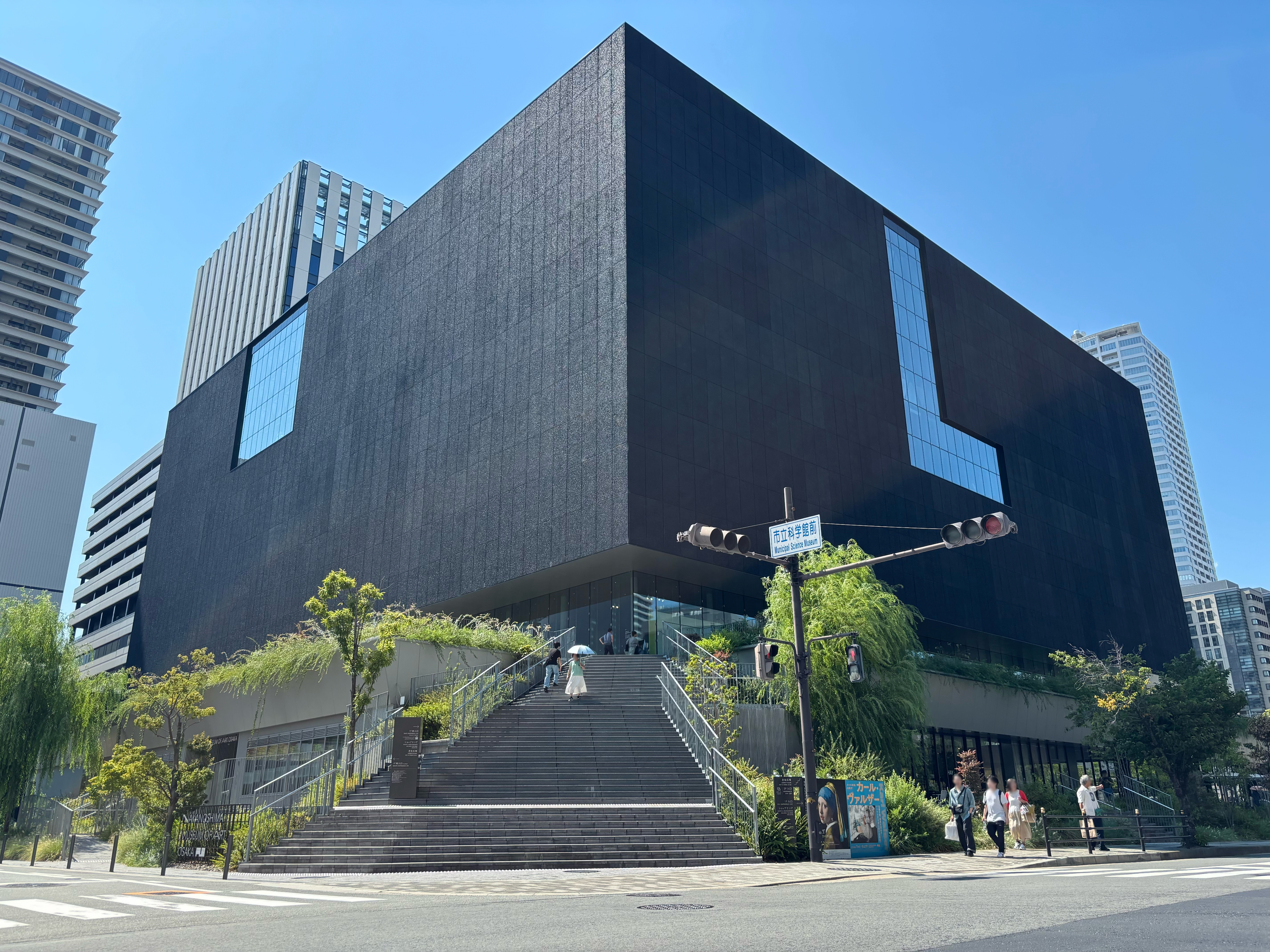
- Interactive map of the Nakanoshima Museum of Art, Osaka area

General information
- Location: Nakanoshima, Kita-ku, Osaka, Osaka Prefecture, Japan
- Opened: 2 February 2022

Website
- nakka-art.jp/en/

Nakanoshima Museum of Art, Osaka (大阪中之島美術館, Ōsaka Nakanoshima Bijutsukan) opened in Nakanoshima, Kita-ku, Osaka, Japan in 2022. The museum is located in the central Nakanoshima district of Osaka. It is one of Japan's newest and most important art museums, with a collection of over 6,000 works of modern and contemporary art and design from the mid-19th century to the present day. Highlights include works by international artists such as Amedeo Modigliani, Salvador Dalí, René Magritte, Jean-Michel Basquiat and Frank Stella, as well as major Japanese artists such as Yuzo Saeki and Jiro Yoshihara, founder of the avant-garde Gutai Art Association. Of particular note is the extensive collection of works by Saeki Yūzō, an artist with close ties to Osaka.

== See also ==
- Museum of Oriental Ceramics, Osaka
- National Museum of Art, Osaka
