= Grand Green Osaka =

Urban park in Osaka, Japan

Umekita Park
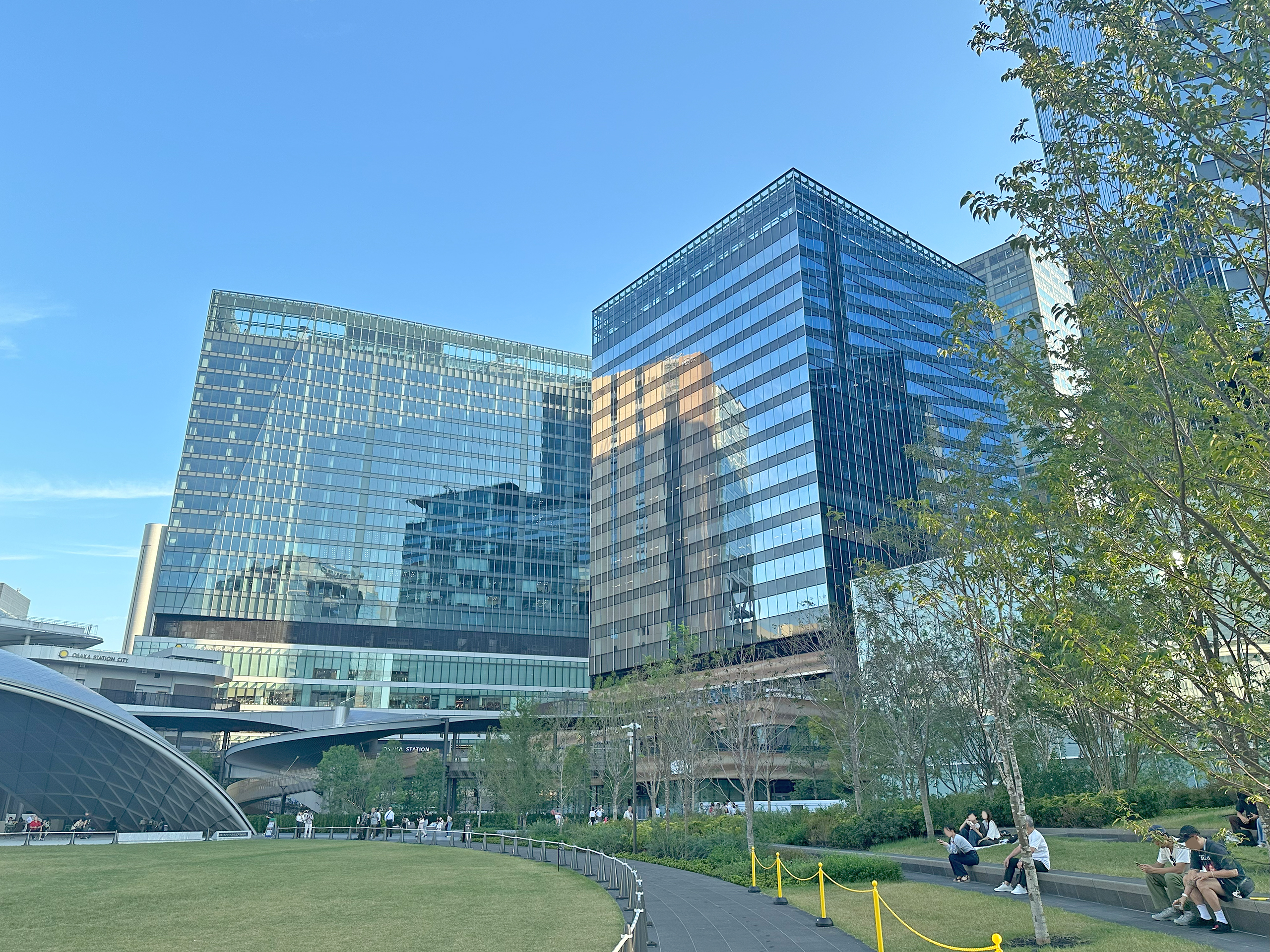
- Interactive map of Umekita Park
- Coordinates: 34.703°N 135.493°E
- Designer: GGN
- Open: September, 2024

Grand Green Osaka (グラングリーン大阪) /Umekita Park is a 24-hectare (59-acre) civic project being developed in Osaka. Most of the park opened on September 6, 2024.

The park is in the Umeda district of Kita-ku, Osaka, near Ōsaka Station, nicknamed Umekita. The Seattle firm GGN was responsible for landscape architecture.
