= Osaka YMCA International School =

- 大阪YMCAインターナショナルスクール

Location
- 6-7-34, Nakatsu Kita-ku Osaka city 531-0071 〒531-0071 大阪市北区中津6-7-34; Japan
- Coordinates: 34.70830600000001°N 135.48887000000002°E

Information
- Type: International School
- Motto: Encounter, Connect, Transform.
- Established: September 2001
- Principal: Adam McGuigan (PYP Principal) & Kenya Washington (MYP/DP Principal)
- Faculty: 50-100
- Grades: Preschool to Grade 12
- Enrollment: 333 Students
- Language: English (primary), Japanese (elective)
- Campuses: Nakatsu Campus (preschool - grade 8), Tosabori Campus (grades 9-12)
- Team name: OYIS Lions
- Accreditation: Accrediting Commission for Schools, Western Association for Schools and Colleges (WASC), International Baccalaureate (IB)
- Website: www.oyis.org

Osaka YMCA International School (大阪YMCAインターナショナルスクール, Ōsaka YMCA Intānashonaru Sukūru; OYIS) is an international school in Kita-ku, Osaka, Japan. Osaka YMCA International School (OYIS) is an English-based, private international school, offering preschool to grade 12. The school year starts in late-August and goes until mid-June–a fall-spring calendar. OYIS began operations in 2001 and received gakko hojin (private school) status from the Osaka prefectural government in 2012. OYIS has a high school program that includes the International Baccalaureate (IB) Diploma Program (DP) which leads to grade 12 graduation. OYIS is currently accredited by the International Baccalaureate Organization (IB) and by the US-based Western Association of Schools and Colleges (WASC).

== History ==
The school was established in September 2001 from a partnership of Osaka city and the YMCA. In June 2023, OYIS celebrated its first grade 12 graduating class.

== Student body ==
As of 2023, OYIS is home to a student population of over 300 students, representing over 30 countries from around the world.
