= Fujita Ram Gong =

- 青銅羊觥
- Type: Guang (vessel)
- Material: Bronze
- Size: 22 cm
- Created: Southern Yangtze, China
- Period/culture: Shang dynasty, 13th–11th century B.C.
- Present location: Cleveland Art Museum, Cleveland, Ohio

The Fujita Ram Gong (Chinese: 觥; pinyin: gōng; Wade–Giles: kung^{1}) is a Shang dynasty Chinese ritual bronze vessel, a gong, in the shape of a ram that dates to the later part of the dynasty in 13th-11th century B.C. Considered significant for its realistic shape and style, it is among 13 known Chinese bronze vessels made in animal-form.

In 1940, it joined the collection of the Fujita Art Museum in Osaka, considered the largest private museum in the Kansai region. The collection includes 4,000 pieces, among which are nine National Treasures and 53 Important Cultural Properties. The gong, along with 30 other artifacts held by Fujita were deaccessioned and sold by Christie's Asia Week in March 2017, where the funds were then used to renovate the museum upon its temporary closure on June 11, 2017, over five years.

== Provenance and background ==
The Fujita Museum collection was formed over decades by Fujita Denzaburō, a businessman of the Meiji era, and subsequently by his sons, Heitarō and Tokujirō, which essentially ran through the family. The collection was formed with the intent of preserving the artifacts of Japan, which underwent dispersion during the Meiji Restoration as a result of the separation of Shintoism from Buddhism. Subsequently, the collection expanded into Chinese art.

The Fujita gong entered the family collection in 1940; it also survived the Bombing of Osaka in 1945, where it stayed within the family with regular exhibition until its deaccessioning in 2017.

== Description ==
Measuring 22 centimeters, the sculpture is significant for its realistic depiction of a ram and its pattern and detailing covering its body.

Based upon the proximity of other bronzes in similar styles, it is believed that the Fujita gong was found in the Southern Yangtze region.

Noted for its realism for the era it was dated, the Fujita gong is noted for its anatomical proportions, realistic head, upturned muzzle with cheekbones, and prominent C-shaped horns. The fetlock on its legs and the vessel's curvature emphasize attention to detail.

Details of other animals, both natural and mythical, are etched on its body, including tigers, birds, a Chinese dragon-like kui (characteristic of Southern style bronzes), and the taotie on its forehead, a common motif in Shang dynasty art. The tiger occupies the chest of the ram, and on the lid of the gong, the bird and the kui is perched on the back of the ram.

The gong was published in many catalogues upon its exhibition, and in a special exhibit in 1968 by the Tokyo National Museum, it was also named 羊形犠尊 (Yáng xíng xī zūn), or "Sheep-shaped zun".

== Deaccessioning and the 2017 Christies Auction ==
The Fujita gong and the museum's collection largely stayed within the family until 2017, when the vessel and other Chinese artifacts were subsequently deaccessioned to raise funds for the rest of the collection. Auctioned in March 2017, the ram was estimated for $6–8 million, but was subsequently hammered for $27,127,500. The auction later set a record for other Chinese ritual bronzes, and for what was expected for US$80 million, 27 works from the museum hammered for a total of $269 million.

The auction funds subsequently went towards a five-year renovation of the museum, once the family treasury by the firm Taisei Design Planner's Architects and Engineers, which converted the museum into a more contemporary setting. In April 2022, the Fujita Museum reopened.

The gong was purchased by Xike Jiulu, who then loaned it to the Cleveland Museum of Art in 2023.

== See also ==
- Four-goat Square Zun - another ritual bronze considered to be made nearby, currently held by the National Museum of China.
