= Nakanoshima Station (Osaka) =

Railway station in Osaka, Japan

Nakanoshima Station 中之島駅
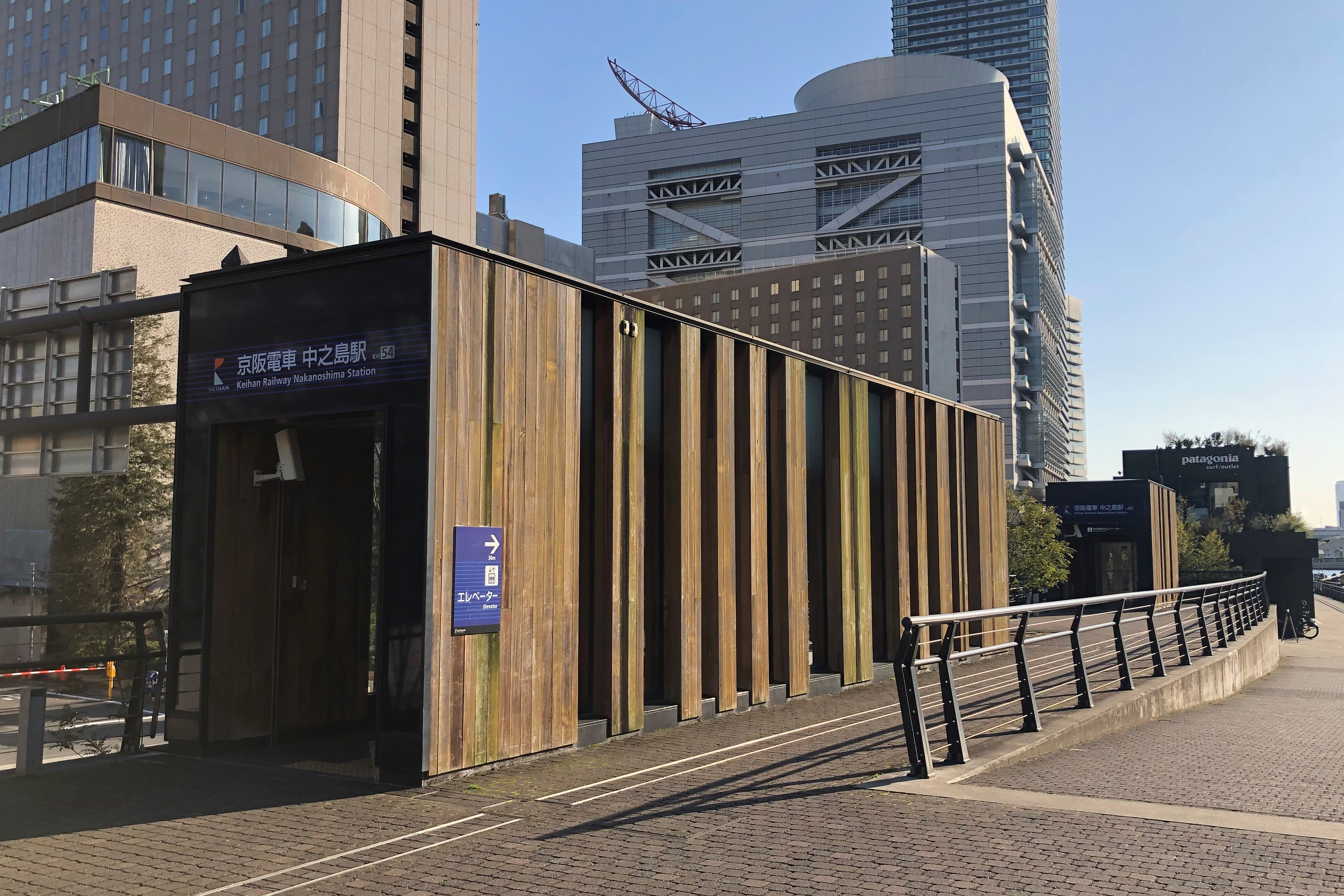
- Station entrance

General information
- Other names: Osaka International Convention Center Station (大阪国際会議場, Ōsaka-Kokusai-Kaigijō-eki)
- Location: Nakanoshima Gochōme, Kita, Osaka, Osaka （大阪市北区中之島五丁目） Japan
- Coordinates: 34°41′27.29″N 135°29′12.7″E
- Operator: Keihan Electric Railway
- Line: Nakanoshima Line
- Platforms: 2

Construction
- Structure type: Underground

History
- Opened: 2008
Location

Nakanoshima Station (中之島駅) is a railway station on the Keihan Nakanoshima Line in Kita-ku, Osaka, Japan. It opened together with the Nakanoshima Line on 19 October 2008. The station is the terminus of the Nakanoshima Line. A separate station, to be operated jointly by West Japan Railway Company (JR West) and Nankai Railway, is to be constructed as part of the Naniwasuji Line project, with opening anticipated around spring 2031.

The station name is occasionally accompanied by the secondary name Osaka International Convention Center (大阪国際会議場, Ōsaka Kokusai Kaigijō).

== Station layout ==
The station consists of an underground island platform serving three tracks.

| 1 | ■ Nakanoshima Line | for Kyōbashi, Hirakatashi, Chūshojima, Sanjō and Demachiyanagi |
| 2 | ■ Nakanoshima Line | for Kyōbashi, Hirakatashi, Chūshojima, Sanjō and Demachiyanagi (in the rush hour) |
| 3 | ■ Nakanoshima Line | extra trains |

== Surroundings ==
Nakanoshima Yonchōme, Kita-ku

- The National Museum of Art, Osaka
- Osaka Science Museum

Nakanoshima Gochōme, Kita-ku

- Rihga Royal Hotel
- Osaka International Convention Center
- Sumitomo Hospital

Nakanoshima Rokuchōme, Kita-ku

- Nakanoshima Center Building
- Nakanoshima Plaza
- Nakanoshima Intes

Fukushima Itchōme, Fukushima-ku

- Hotarumachi (Asahi Broadcasting Corporation, ABC Hall, Dojima River Forum, etc.)
- Nakanoshima Public Prosecutors Office Building (Osaka High Public Prosecutors Office, Osaka District Public Prosecutors Office, etc.)

Fukushima Nichōme, Fukushima-ku

- KEPCO Hospital

Fukushima Yonchōme, Fukushima-ku

- Osaka Koseinenkin Hospital
- Shimo-fukushima Park

Fukushima Gohōme, Fukushima-ku

- Laxa Osaka
  - Hotel Hanshin, etc.

Noda Itchōme, Fukushima-ku

- Osaka Central Wholesale Market

Tosabori, Nishi-ku

- Tosabori Daibiru
  - JSOL Osaka Head Office
  - The Japan Research Institute, Limited. Osaka Head Office

=== Train stations ===
- Hanshin Railway Main Line Fukushima Station
- JR West JR Tōzai Line Shin-Fukushima Station
- JR West Osaka Loop Line Fukushima Station

== Adjacent stations ==
| « | Service | » |
Keihan Railway Nakanoshima Line
| Terminus | All types | Watanabebashi |
