= Oh-Ebashi LPC & Partners =

弁護士法人大江橋法律事務所 Oh-Ebashi LPC & Partners
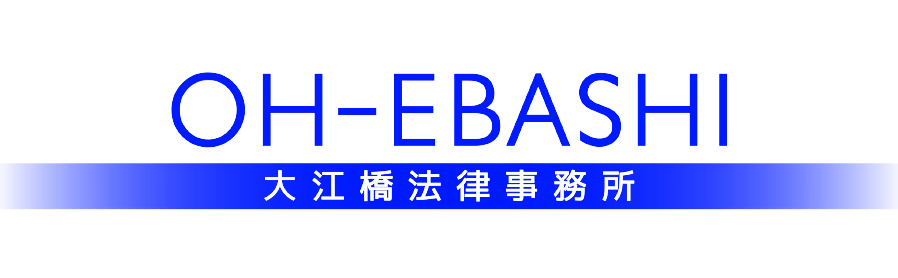
- Headquarters: Osaka, Japan
- No. of offices: 3
- No. of attorneys: 106 Japanese Lawyers, 6 Foreign Lawyers
- No. of employees: about 110
- Major practice areas: general practice
- Date founded: 1981
- Founder: Tadashi Ishikawa, Hiroaki Tsukamoto & Makoto Miyazaki
- Company type: legal professional corporation under Japanese law
- Website: Official English Website

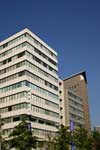
Osaka office

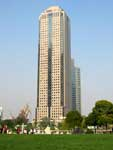
Shanghai office

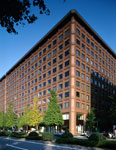
Tōkyō office

Oh-Ebashi LPC & Partners (弁護士法人大江橋法律事務所, Bengoshi Hōjin Ōebashi Hōritsu Jimusho) is the largest law firm in Osaka, Japan and 8th largest law firm in Japan.

After 10 years of relationship with China-based clients, Oh-Ebashi LPC & Partners was the first Japanese law firm to open an office abroad in Shanghai, China.

Although all three offices of Oh-Ebashi LPC & Partners are active in Corporate Legal Affairs, Individual Representation and Pro Bono Activities, Osaka-based M&A work concerning foreign and domestic companies remains a "core strength".

== Development history ==
- (1974 April) Makoto Miyazaki founds Makoto Miyazaki Law Office (宮崎誠法律事務所, Miyazaki Makoto Hōritsu Jimusho)
- (1980 April) Tadashi Ishikawa founds Ishikawa Law Office (石川法律事務所, Ishikawa Hōritsu Jimusho)
- (1981 January) Ishikawa, Tsukamoto and Miyazaki together found Ishikawa Tsukamoto & Miyazaki Law Office (石川・塚本・宮崎法律事務所, Ishikawa Tsukamoto Miyazaki Hōritsu Jimusho)
- (1983 January) Name officially changes to Oh-Ebashi Law Office (大江橋法律事務所, Ōebashi Hōritsu Jimusho)
- (1995 July) Opening of the Shanghai Office
- (2002 August) Reorganized into a Legal Professional Corporation; name officially changes to the current Oh-Ebashi LPC & Partners (弁護士法人大江橋法律事務所, Bengoshi Hōjin Ōebashi Hōritsu Jimusho)
- (2002 September) Opening of the Tokyo Office

The main and largest office is in Kita-ku, Osaka. The Shanghai office opened in 1995, the Tōkyō office opened in 2002, and there is an office in Nagoya.
