= Kashima Station (Osaka) =

Railway station in Osaka, Japan

Coordinates: 34.7273°N 135.4543°E

Kashima Station 加島
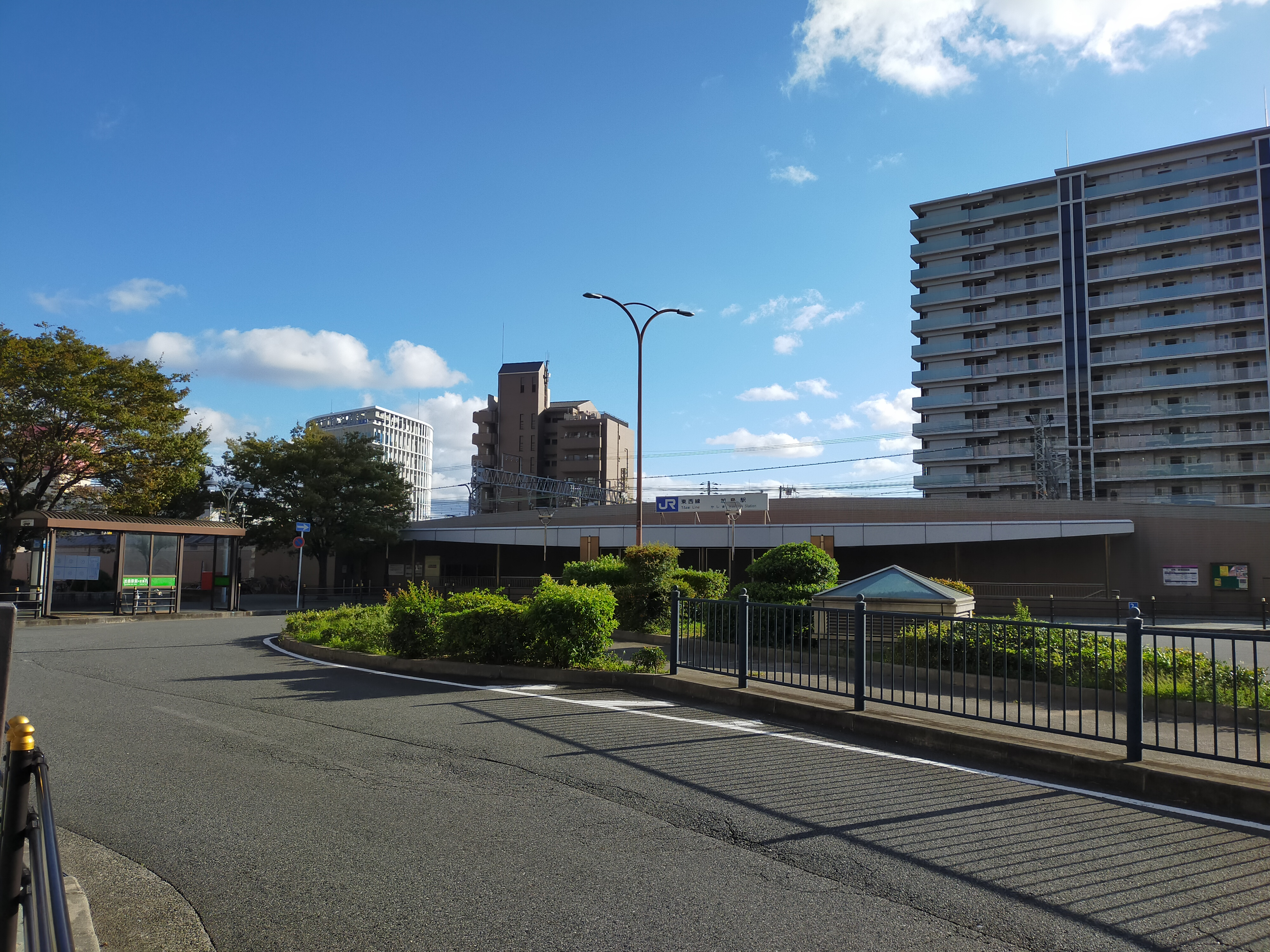
- Station entrance in 2021

General information
- Location: 大阪市淀川区加島三丁目10; Osaka; Japan
- Owner: West Japan Railway Company
- Operator: West Japan Railway Company
- Line: JR Tozai Line
- Platforms: 2
- Tracks: 2
- Train operators: JR West

Construction
- Structure type: Underground
- Parking: No
- Cycle facilities: Yes
- Accessible: Yes

Other information
- Station code: JR-H48

History
- Opened: 8 March 1997
Location

Kashima Station (加島駅, Kashima-eki) is a railway station in Yodogawa-ku, Osaka, Osaka Prefecture, Japan.

== Lines ==
- West Japan Railway Company
  - JR Tōzai Line

== Layout ==
- There is an island platform with two tracks on the second floor below ground, under the Tokaido Line (JR Kobe Line) between Tsukamoto and Amagasaki.

1	■ JR Tōzai Line	for Amagasaki, Takarazuka and Sannomiya
2	■ JR Tōzai Line	for Kitashinchi, Kyobashi and Shijonawate

== History ==
Kashima Station opened on 8 March 1997 coinciding with the opening of the JR Tōzai Line between Kyobashi and Amagasaki.

Station numbering was introduced in March 2018 with Kashima being assigned station number JR-H48.

== Adjacent stations ==
«	Service	»
West Japan Railway Company (JR West)
JR Tōzai Line
Mitejima	Local	Amagasaki
Mitejima	Regional Rapid Service	Amagasaki
Mitejima	Rapid Service	Amagasaki
