= Takarazuka University =

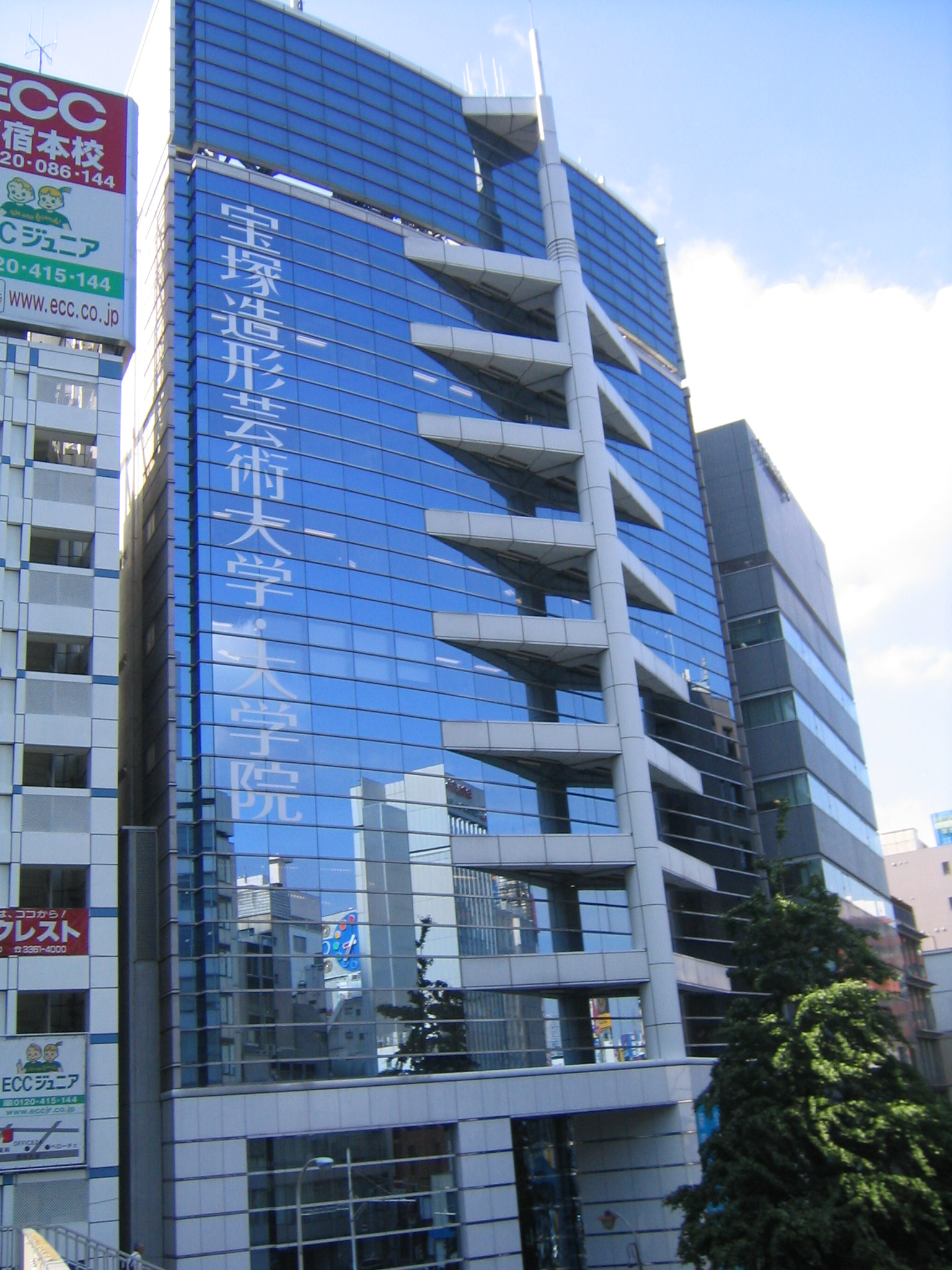
Shinjuku Campus, Tokyo

Takarazuka University (宝塚大学, Takarazuka daigaku, renamed from "Takarazuka University of Art and Design (宝塚造形芸術大学, Takarazuka zōkei geijutsu daigaku)" on April 1, 2010) is a private university in Takarazuka, Hyōgo, Japan, established in 1987.

== Campus ==
- Takarazuka Campus (School of Art & Design and Media Design): 7-27, Hanayashiki-Tsutsujigaoka, Takarazuka, Hyogo (34°50′10.54″N 135°24′0.36″E)
- Umeda Campus, Osaka (School of Nursing): 13-16, Shibata 1-chome, Kita-ku, Osaka (34°42′28.38″N 135°29′49.09″E)
- Shinjuku Campus, Tokyo (Tokyo School of Media Content): 11-1 Nishi-Shinjuku 7-chome, Shinjuku, Tokyo (35°41′37.67″N 139°41′50.28″E)
