= Ōsakatemmangū Station =

Railway station in Osaka, Japan

Ōsakatemmangū Station 大阪天満宮駅
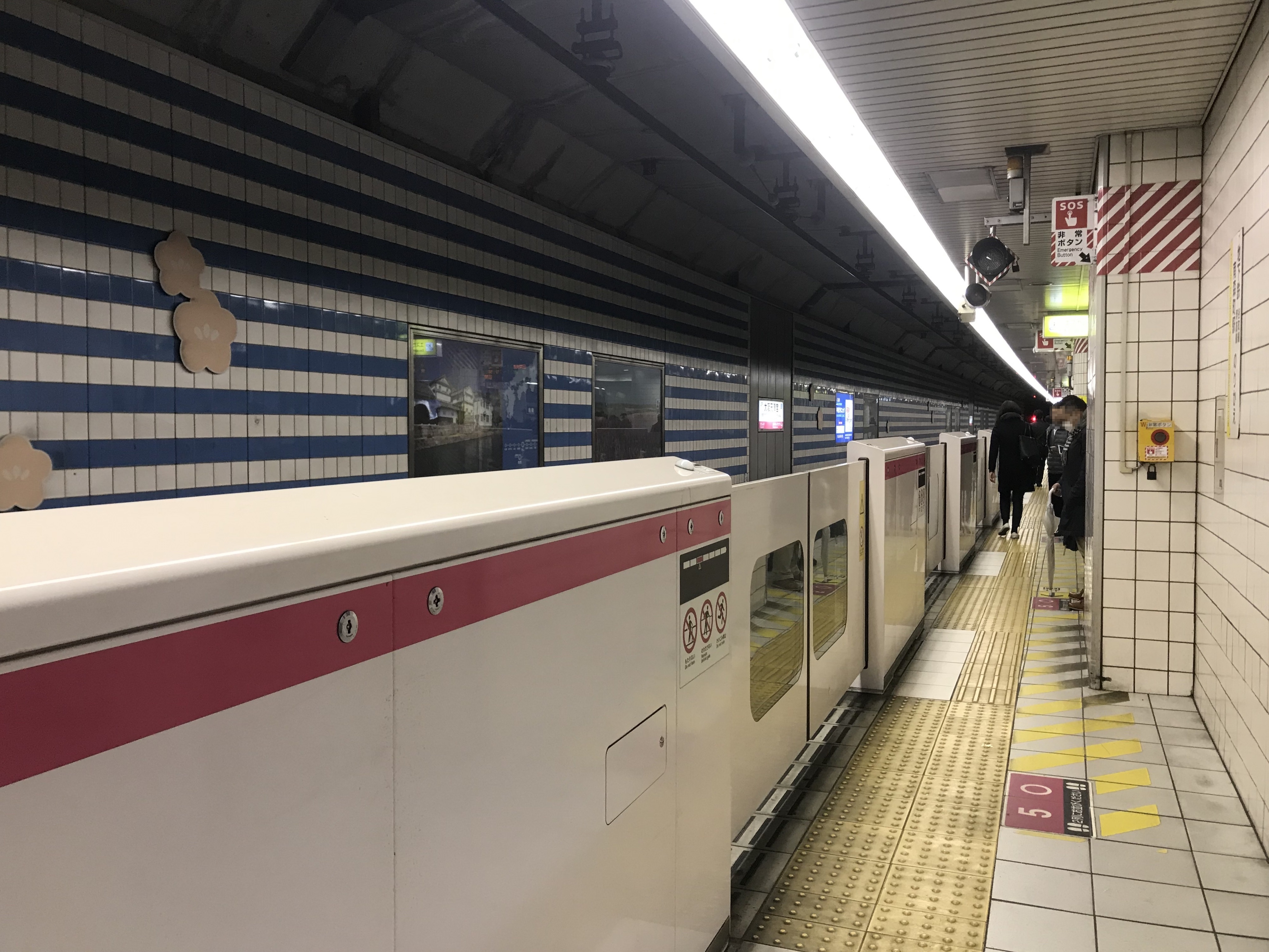
- View of underground platforms

General information
- Location: 2-10 Higashi-temma, Kita-ku, Osaka ( 大阪市北区東天満二丁目10先); Japan
- Coordinates: 34°41′50.43″N 135°30′48.38″E
- Operator: JR West
- Line: JR Tōzai Line
- Platforms: 2
- Tracks: 2
- Connections: Bus terminal

Construction
- Structure type: Underground

Other information
- Station code: JR-H43

History
- Opened: 1997
Location
- Location within Osaka Prefecture Location within Japan

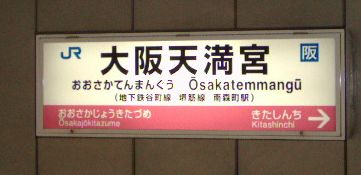
Station signage

Ōsakatemmangū Station (大阪天満宮駅, Ōsaka-Tenmangū-eki) is a railway station on the West Japan Railway Company JR Tōzai Line in Kita-ku, Osaka, Japan. The station's location is close to the Osaka Temmangu Shrine.

== Lines ==
- West Japan Railway Company JR Tōzai Line
- Osaka Municipal Subway (Minami-morimachi Station)
  - Tanimachi Line (T21)
  - Sakaisuji Line (K13)
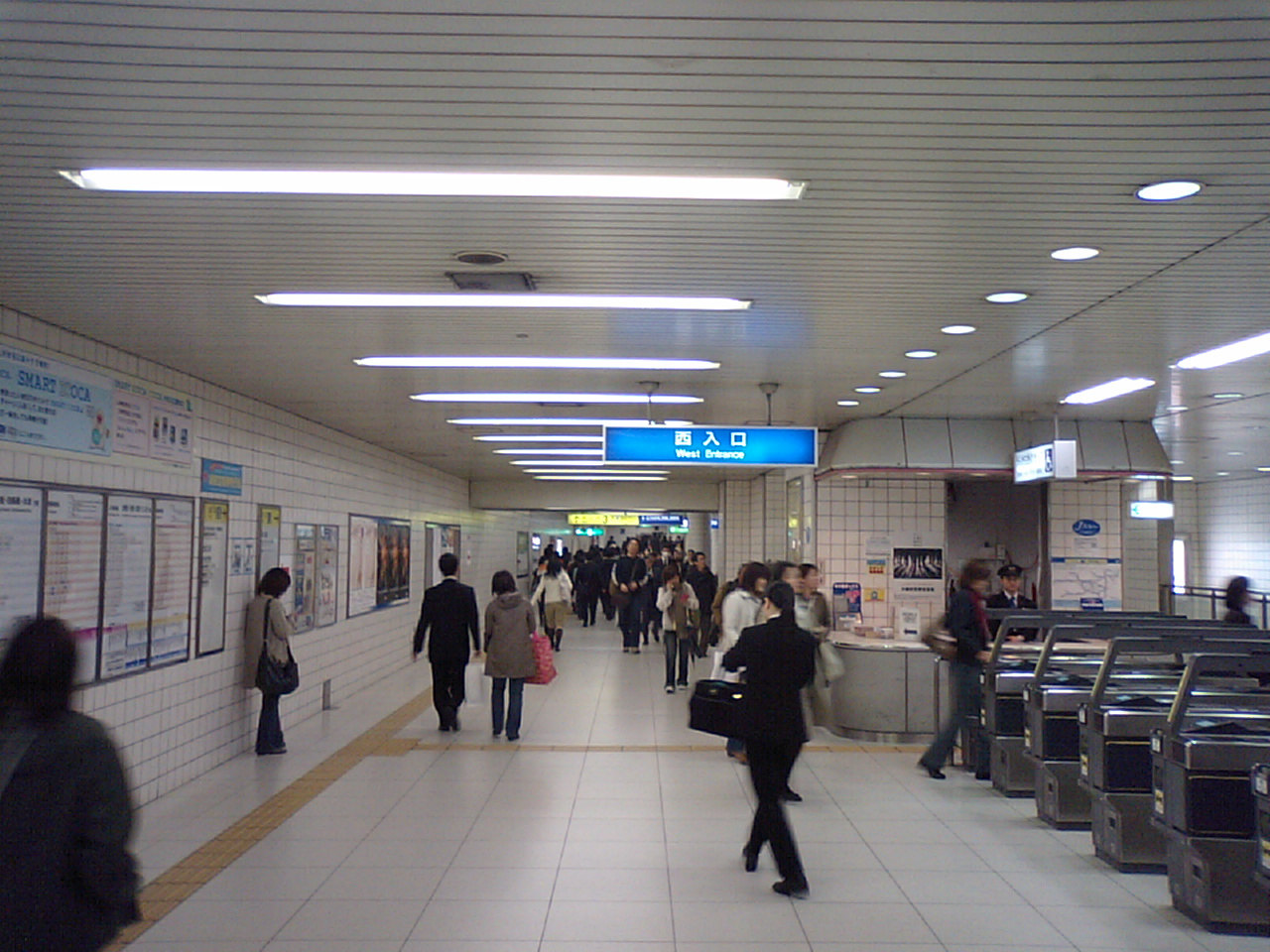
Underground passage to Minami-Morimachi Station seen in 2008

== Layout ==
There is an island platform with two tracks.

1	■ JR Tōzai Line	for Kitashinchi and Amagasaki
2	■ JR Tōzai Line	for Kyōbashi, Shijōnawate and Matsuiyamate

== History ==
Ōsakatemmangū Station opened on 8 March 1997, coinciding with the opening of the JR Tōzai Line between Kyobashi and Amagasaki.

Station numbering was introduced in March 2018 with Ōsakatemmangū being assigned station number JR-H43.

== Surroundings ==
- Osaka Temmangu Shrine
- Japan National Route 1 (Sonezaki-dori)
- Osaka Prefectural Route 14 Osaka Takatsuki Kyoto Route (Tenjimbashisuji)
- Osaka Prefectural Route 102 Ebisu minami-morimachi Route (Tenjimbashisuji)
- Japan Mint
- Temma Tenjin Hanjotei
- Daiwa Minami-morimachi Building
  - Resona Bank
  - FM802
- Tenjimbashisuji Shopping Arcade
- Sumitomo Mitsui Banking Corporation
- The Yomiuri Shimbun Osaka

== Adjacent stations ==
«	Service	»
West Japan Railway Company (JR West)
JR Tōzai Line
Osakajo-kitazume	Local	Kitashinchi
Osakajo-kitazume	Regional Rapid Service	Kitashinchi
Osakajo-kitazume	Rapid Service	Kitashinchi
