= Ōsakajō-kitazume Station =

Railway station in Osaka, Japan

Ōsakajō-kitazume 大阪城北詰駅
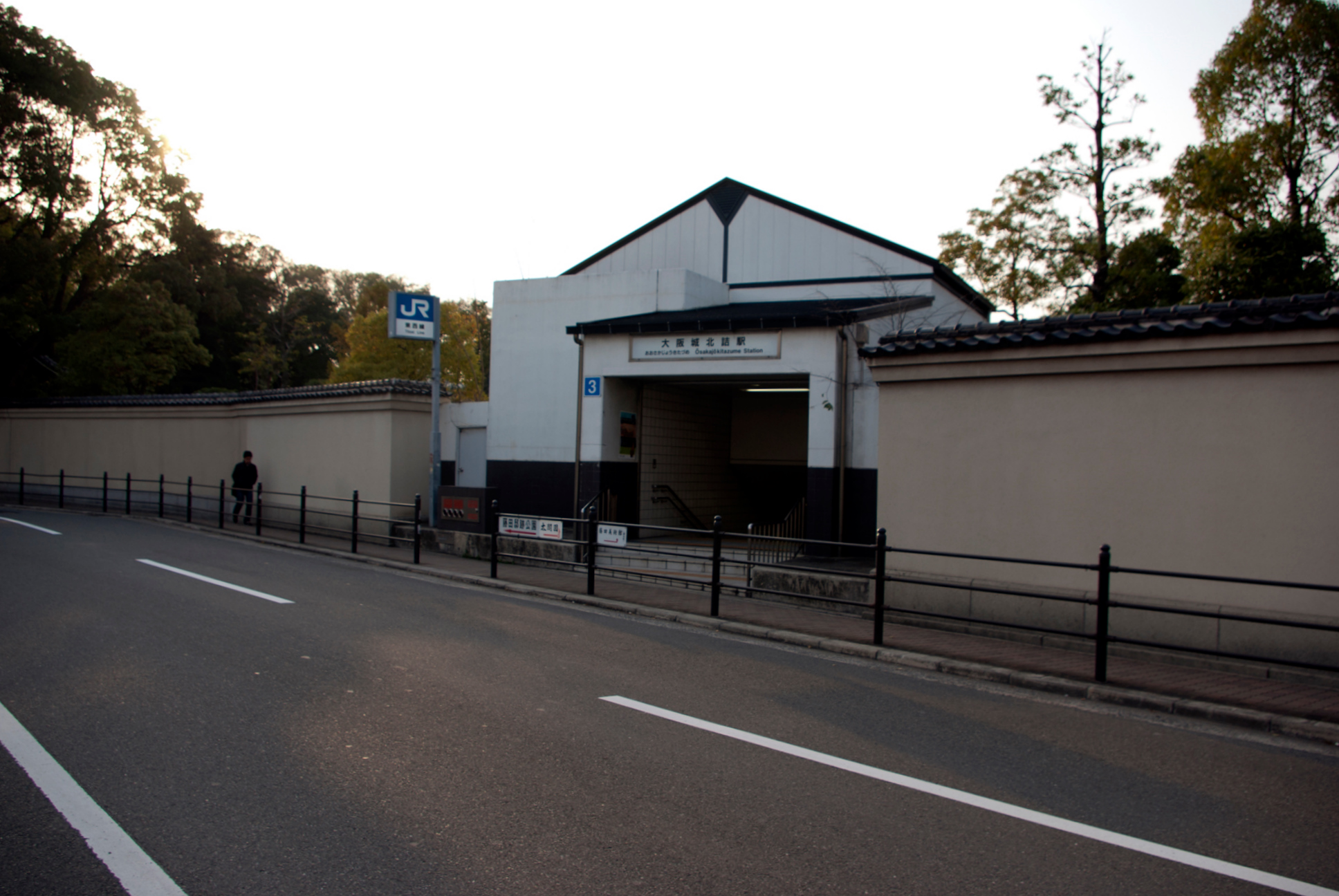
- Facade of the station in 2010

General information
- Location: 7, Amishima, Miyakojima, Osaka (大阪市都島区網島町7); Japan
- Coordinates: 34°41′39.42″N 135°31′31.93″E
- Operator: JR West
- Line: JR Tōzai Line
- Platforms: 2
- Tracks: 2
- Connections: Bus terminal

Construction
- Structure type: Underground

Other information
- Station code: JR-H42

History
- Opened: 1997

Services
Preceding station	JR West	Following station
Ōsakatemmangū towards Amagasaki	JR Tōzai Line Local Regional Rapid Service Rapid Service	Kyōbashi Terminus
Location
- Location within Osaka Prefecture Location within Japan

Ōsakajō-kitazume Station (大阪城北詰駅, Ōsakajō-kitazume-eki) is a railway station on the West Japan Railway Company JR Tōzai Line in Amijimacho, Miyakojima-ku, Osaka, Osaka Prefecture, Japan.

The station took over the ridership of the former Katamachi Station, which was the original terminal for the Gakkentoshi Line, now starting at Kyobashi Station. The former Keihan Main Line also had a station in the same area.

== Layout ==
There is an island platform with two tracks.

1	■ JR Tōzai Line	for Kitashinchi and Amagasaki
2	■ JR Tōzai Line	for Kyōbashi, Shijōnawate and Matsuiyamate

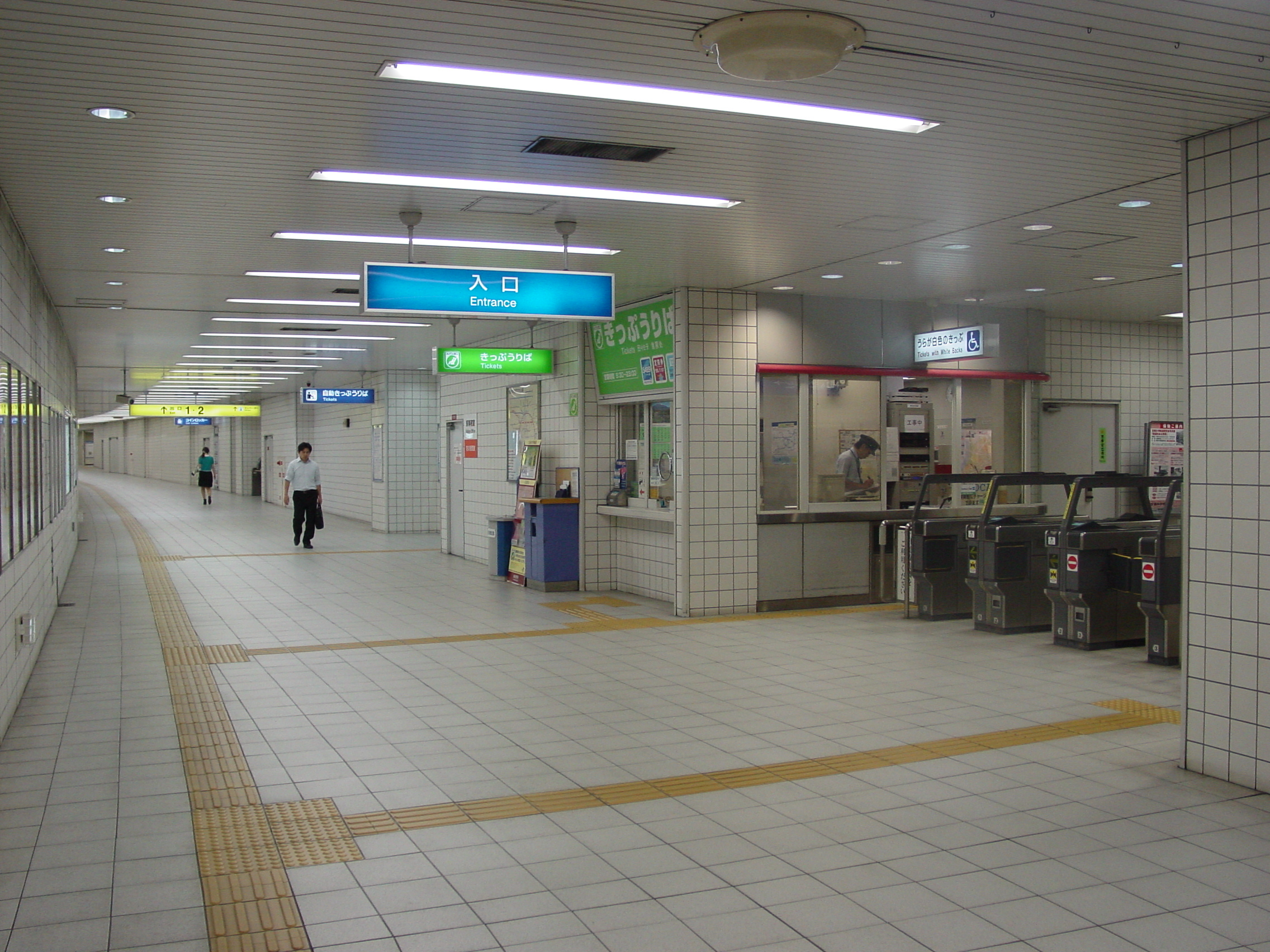
Concourse view

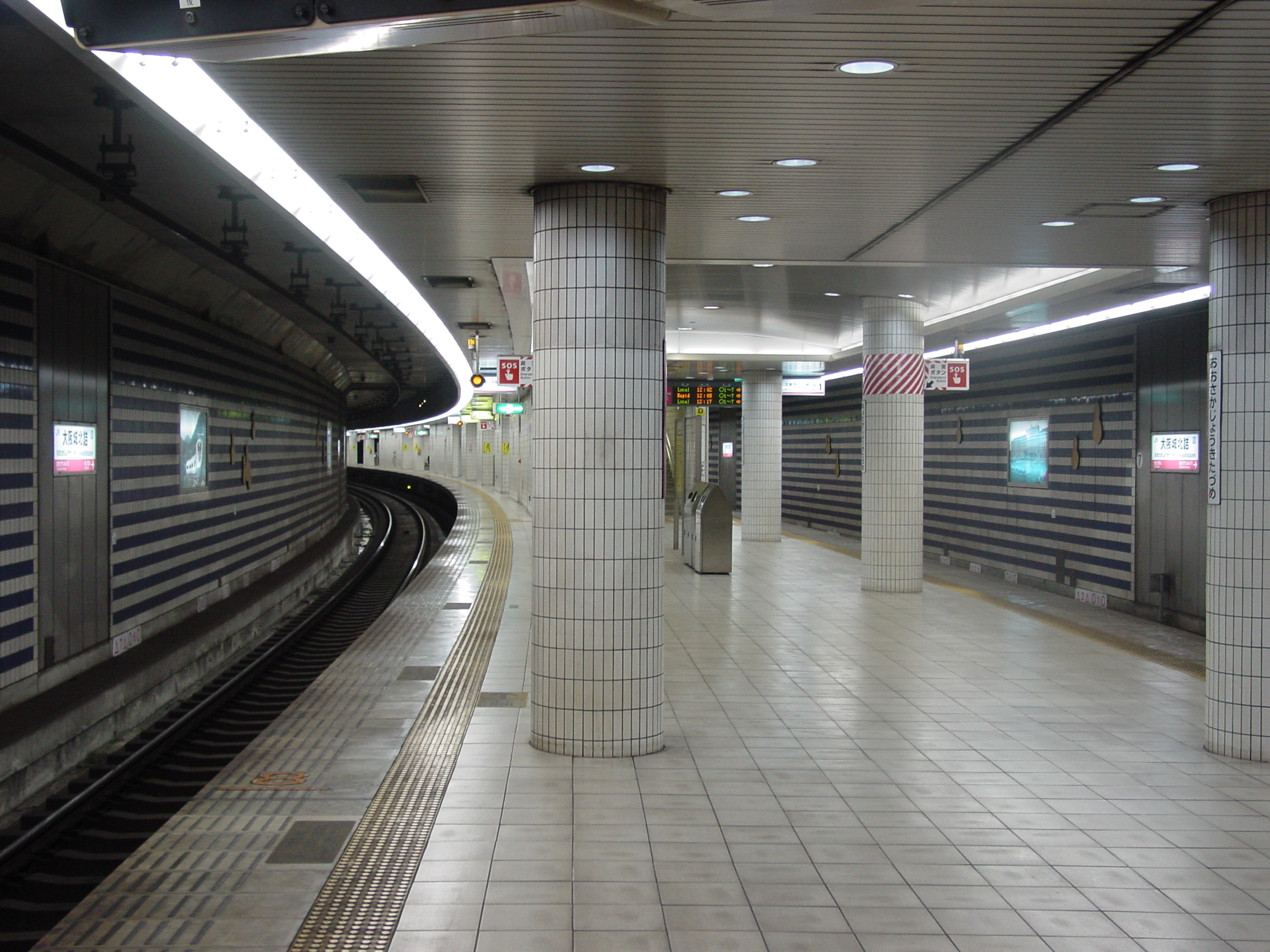
View of the platforms

== History ==
Ōsakajō-kitazume Station opened on 8 March 1997, coinciding with the opening of the JR Tōzai Line between Kyobashi and Amagasaki.

Station numbering was introduced in March 2018 with Ōsakajō-kitazume being assigned station number JR-H42.

== Surroundings ==
- Sakuramoniya Park
- Japan Mint
- Fujita Art Museum
