= Shin-Fukushima Station =

Railway station in Osaka, Japan

Coordinates: 34°41′41.85″N 135°29′8.4″E

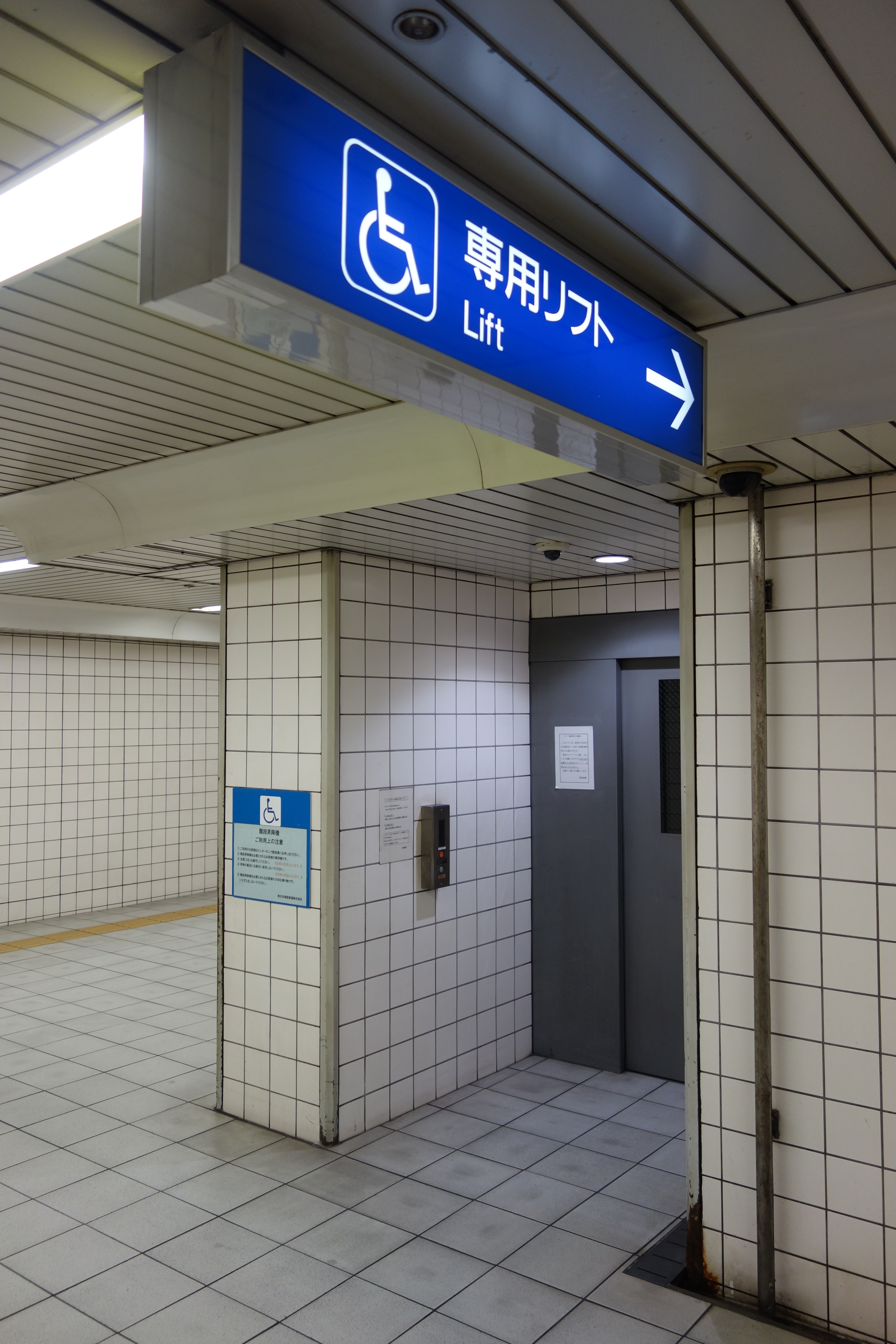
Wheelchair Lift inside Shin-Fukushima Station

Shin-Fukushima Station (新福島駅, Shin-Fukushima-eki) is a railway station in Fukushima-ku, Osaka, Osaka Prefecture, Japan.

== Line ==
- West Japan Railway Company (JR West)
  - JR Tōzai Line

Stations and rail lines near Shin-Fukushima Station

- JR West Osaka Loop Line: Fukushima Station (no connection)
- Hanshin Railway Main Line: Fukushima Station
- Keihan Railway Nakanoshima Line: Nakanoshima Station

== Layout ==
- There is an island platform with two tracks on the second floor below ground.

1	■ JR Tōzai Line	for Amagasaki, Takarazuka and Sannomiya
2	■ JR Tōzai Line	for Kitashinchi, Kyobashi and Shijonawate

== History ==
Shin-Fukushima Station opened on 8 March 1997 (28 years ago), coinciding with the opening of the JR Tōzai Line between Kyobashi and Amagasaki.

Station numbering was introduced in March 2018 with Shin-Fukushima being assigned station number JR-H45.

== Adjacent stations ==
«	Service	»
West Japan Railway Company (JR West)
JR Tōzai Line
Kitashinchi	Local	Ebie
Kitashinchi	Regional Rapid Service	Ebie
Kitashinchi	Rapid Service	Ebie
