= JR Tōzai Line =

Railway line in Japan

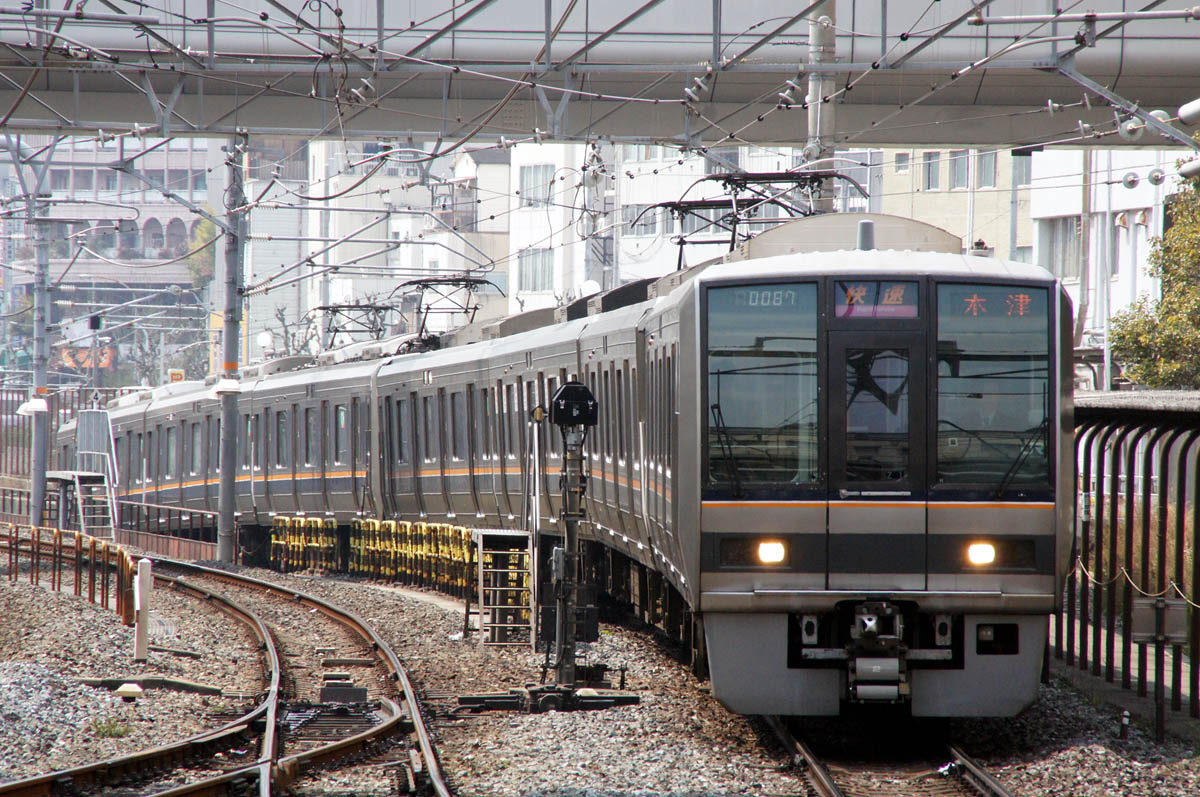
- 207 series EMU

Overview
- Native name: JR東西線
- Owner: Kansai Rapid Railway Co., Ltd.
- Locale: Osaka and Amagasaki
- Termini: Kyōbashi; Amagasaki
- Stations: 9

Service
- Type: Commuter rail
- System: Urban Network
- Operator: JR West
- Rolling stock: 207 series EMU; 321 series EMU
- Daily ridership: 233,577 (daily 2015)

History
- Opened: 8 March 1997; 29 years ago

Technical
- Line length: 12.5 km (7.8 mi)
- Number of tracks: Double-track
- Track gauge: 1,067 mm (3 ft 6 in)
- Electrification: 1,500 V DC (overhead lines)
- Operating speed: 90 km/h (56 mph)
- Signalling: Automatic Closed block
- Train protection system: ATS-P

The JR Tōzai Line (JR東西線, Jei-āru Tōzai-sen; lit. 'East-West Line') is one of several commuter rail lines and services in the Osaka-Kobe-Kyoto Metropolitan Area, operated by West Japan Railway Company (JR West). The line runs underground in an east-west direction through central Osaka and connects the Gakkentoshi Line at Kyobashi Station in Osaka and the JR Takarazuka Line and the JR Kobe Line at Amagasaki. All stations on this line are in the city of Osaka, except for the western terminus in Amagasaki, Hyōgo Prefecture.

== Basic data ==
- Operators, distances: 12.5 km / 7.8 mi.
  - West Japan Railway Company (Category-2, Services)
  - Kansai Rapid Railway Co., Ltd. (Category-3, Tracks)
- Railway signalling: Automatic
- CTC centers: Ōsaka Operation Control Center
- CTC system: JR Takarazuka – JR Tozai – Gakkentoshisen traffic control system (JR west traffic control system)

== Operation ==
Many trains are local services and stop at every station on the line, but rapid (快速) and regional rapid (区間快速) services that skip some stations are also operated. Some trains terminate at Amagasaki, but most westbound trains continue on the Kobe Line to Nishi-Akashi or on the Takarazuka Line to Tsukaguchi and Takarazuka. All eastbound trains continue past Kyobashi on the Gakkentoshi Line.

== History ==
The line was initially proposed in 1971 by Japanese National Railways (JNR) as a link between the Katamachi Line, which connected Osaka to its eastern suburbs, and Fukuchiyama Line, which connected the city to its northwestern suburbs. Osaka's municipal government had maintained tight controls over transportation within the city, and most intercity lines terminated outside the city center. The line, provisionally known as Katafuku Line (片福線; Kata- from Katamachi, -fuku from Fukuchiyama), would give commuters a single-seat ride from the suburbs and an east-west connection through central Osaka.

A permit to lay the track was given 10 years later, but the project stopped because of JNR's financial problems.

In 1988, after JNR privatized and split into Japan Railway companies, West Japan Railway Company formed a private-public entity called Kansai Rapid Railway Co., Ltd. (関西高速鉄道株式会社, Kansai kōsoku tetsudō kabushiki gaisha) with the prefectural governments of Osaka and Hyōgo, and the cities of Osaka and Amagasaki.

The line was completed and opened as JR Tozai Line in 1997.

== Stations ==
No	Station		Transfers	Location	
Through train service to Katamachi Line (Gakkentoshi Line)
JR-H41	Kyobashi	京橋	Osaka Loop Line (JR-O08); Keihan Main Line (KH03); Nagahori Tsurumi-ryokuchi Line (N22)	Joto-ku	Osaka
JR-H42	Ōsakajō-kitazume	大阪城北詰		Miyakojima-ku	Osaka
JR-H43	Osaka-Temmangu	大阪天満宮	Sakaisuji Line (K13: Minami-morimachi Station); Tanimachi Line (T21: Minami-morimachi Station)	Kita-ku	Osaka
JR-H44	Kitashinchi	北新地	Tōkaidō Main Line ( JR Kyoto Line (JR-A47), JR Kobe Line (JR-A47), JR Takarazuka Line (JR-G47), all at Osaka Station); Osaka Higashi Line (JR-F01: Osaka Station); Osaka Loop Line (JR-O11: Osaka Station); Yotsubashi Line (Y11: Nishi-Umeda Station); Midōsuji Line (M16: Umeda Station); Tanimachi Line (T20: Higashi-Umeda Station); Hankyū Kōbe Line, Hankyu Kyoto Line, Hankyu Takarazuka Line (HK-01: Umeda Station); Hanshin Main Line (HS 01: Umeda Station); Keihan Nakanoshima Line (KH53: Watanabebashi)	Kita-ku	Osaka
JR-H45	Shin-Fukushima	新福島	Osaka Loop Line (JR-O12: Fukushima); Hanshin Main Line (HS 02: Fukushima Station); Keihan Nakanoshima Line (KH54: Nakanoshima)	Fukushima-ku	Osaka
JR-H46	Ebie	海老江	Hanshin Main Line (HS 03: Noda Station); Sennichimae Line (S11: Nodahanshin Station)	Fukushima-ku	Osaka
JR-H47	Mitejima	御幣島		Nishiyodogawa-ku	Osaka
JR-H48	Kashima	加島		Yodogawa-ku	Osaka
JR-H49	Amagasaki	尼崎	Tōkaidō Main Line (JR Kobe Line) (JR-A49); Fukuchiyama Line (JR Takarazuka Line) (JR-G49)	Amagasaki, Hyōgo Prefecture	
Through train services to Tōkaidō Main Line (JR Kobe Line) or Fukuchiyama Line (JR Takarazuka Line)

== Rolling stock ==
- 207 series (from 1991)
- 321 series (from 2005)

=== Former ===
- 223-6000 series (from March 2008, until March 2011)
