= Grand Cube Osaka =

Convention center in the city of Osaka, Japan

Osaka International Convention Center
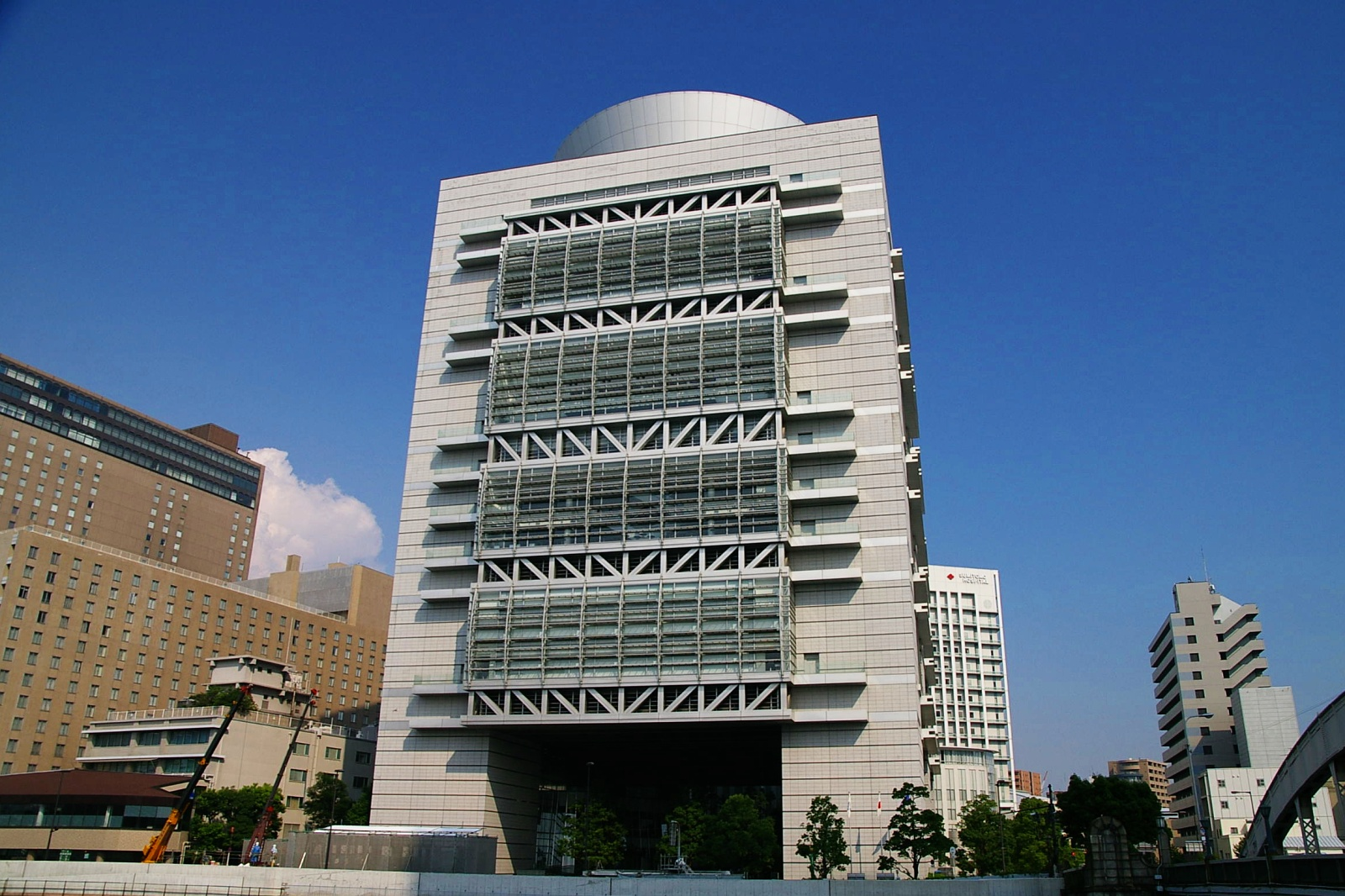
- Interactive map of Osaka International Convention Center
- Address: 5-3-51, Nakanoshima,
- Location: Kita-ku, Osaka, Osaka, Japan
- Coordinates: 34.6894°N 135.486°E
- Owner: Osaka Prefecture
- Operator: Osaka International Convention Center Corporation
- Capacity: 2,754 (Auditorium)
- Public transit: Keihan Nakanoshima Line at Nakanoshima

Construction
- Built: December 17, 1996 - December 24, 1999
- Opened: April 1, 2000
- Cost: ¥70 billion (¥78 billion in 2024 yen)

Website
- www.gco.co.jp/en/

Osaka International Convention Center (大阪府立国際会議場, Ōsaka Furitsu Kokusai Kaigijō), also known as Grand Cube Osaka (グランキューブ大阪, Guran kyūbu Ōsaka), is a convention center in the city of Osaka, Japan.

Located adjacent to the convention center is underground Nakanoshima Station served by Keihan Electric Railway Nakanoshima Line as the terminus.

== Past events ==
- 2001 World Tourism Organization Congress
- 2004 Rotary International World Convention
- 34th G8 summit Finance minister convention
- Japanese High School Baseball Championship Draw (2009)
- 26th International Conference on Computational Linguistics (2016)
- Fanmeeting 2019: SONE Japan presents - Taeyeon's Atelier-
