= Fukushima Station (Osaka) =

Railway station in Osaka, Japan

Fukushima 福島

General information
- Location: Fukushima, Osaka, Osaka; Japan
- Coordinates: 34°41′32.48″N 135°28′20.03″E
- Operator: JR West; Hanshin Electric Railway
- Lines: Osaka Loop Line; Hanshin Main Line
Location

Fukushima Station (福島駅, Fukushima-eki) is a railway station in Fukushima-ku, Osaka, Japan, operated by the West Japan Railway Company (JR West) and the private railway operator Hanshin Electric Railway.

== Lines ==
Fukushima Station is served by the JR West Osaka Loop Line and the Hanshin Main Line. It is close to Shin-Fukushima Station on the JR Tōzai Line.

== JR West ==
Fukushima Station 福島
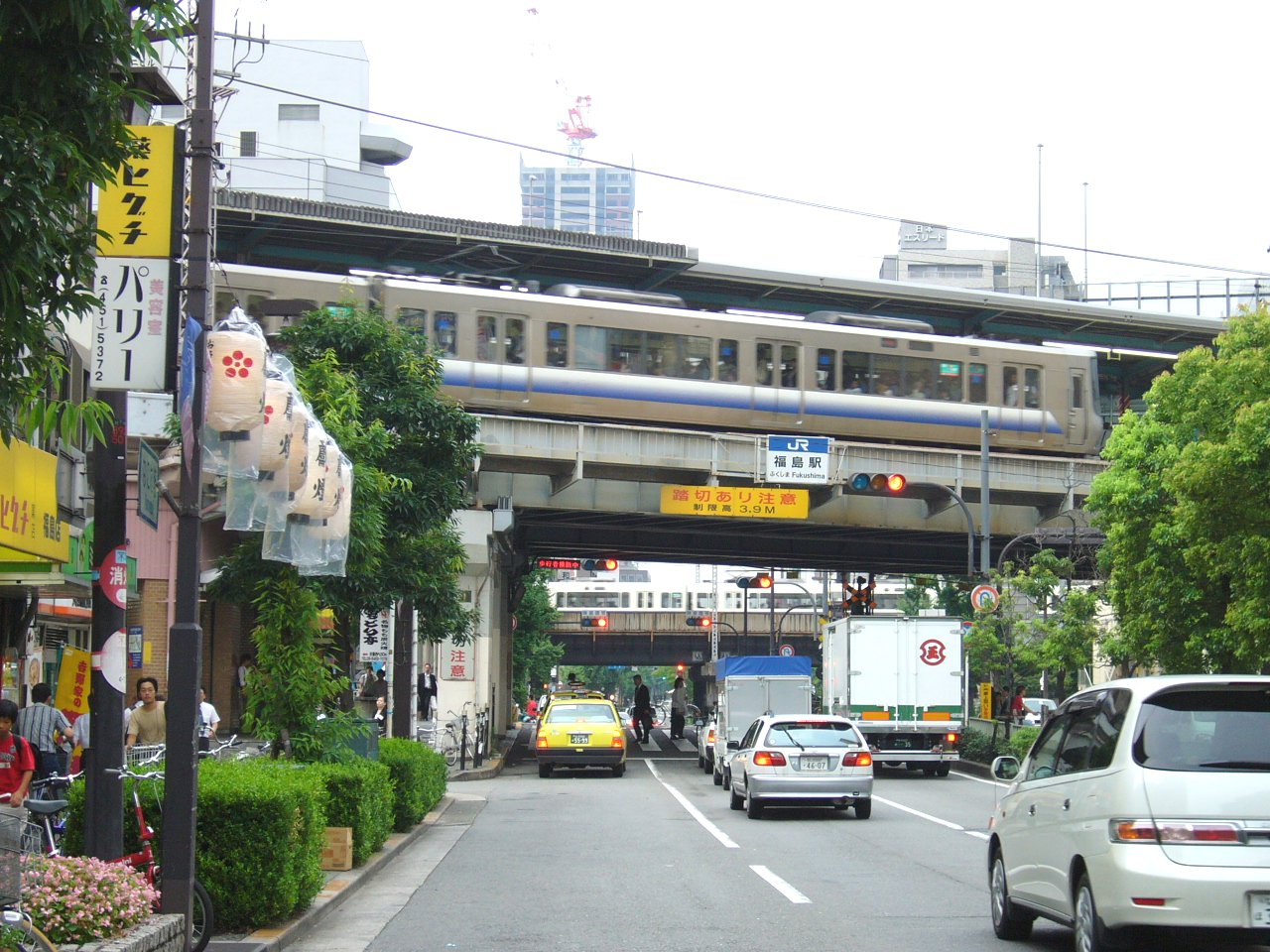
- JR West Fukushima Station

General information
- Location: 7-1-3 Fukushima （大阪府大阪市福島区福島7丁目1番3号） Japan
- Operator: JR West
- Line: Osaka Loop Line

Other information
- Station code: JR-O12

History
- Opened: 1898
Location

=== Platforms ===
The JR West station consists of an elevated island platform serving two tracks.

1	■ Osaka Loop Line	inner track for Nishikujo, Bentencho, Shin-Imamiya and Universal City
2	■ Osaka Loop Line	outer track for Osaka and Kyobashi

=== Adjacent stations ===
«	Service	»
Osaka Loop Line
Osaka	Local	Noda
Osaka	Regional Rapid	Noda
Osaka	Direct Rapid (Clockwise trains only)	Noda
Osaka	Yamatoji Rapid	Nishikujo
Osaka	Rapid	Nishikujo
Osaka	Kansai Airport Rapid	Nishikujo
Osaka	Kishuji Rapid	Nishikujo
Rapid (only running from Shin-Osaka for Wakayama): Does not stop at this station
B Rapid (only running from Wakayama to Shin-Osaka): Does not stop at this station
Limited Express Kuroshio (running from Shingu to Shin-Osaka): Does not stop at this station
Limited Express Haruka: Does not stop at this station

=== History ===
Station numbering was introduced in March 2018 with Fukushima being assigned station number JR-O12.

== Hanshin ==
Fukushima Station 福島
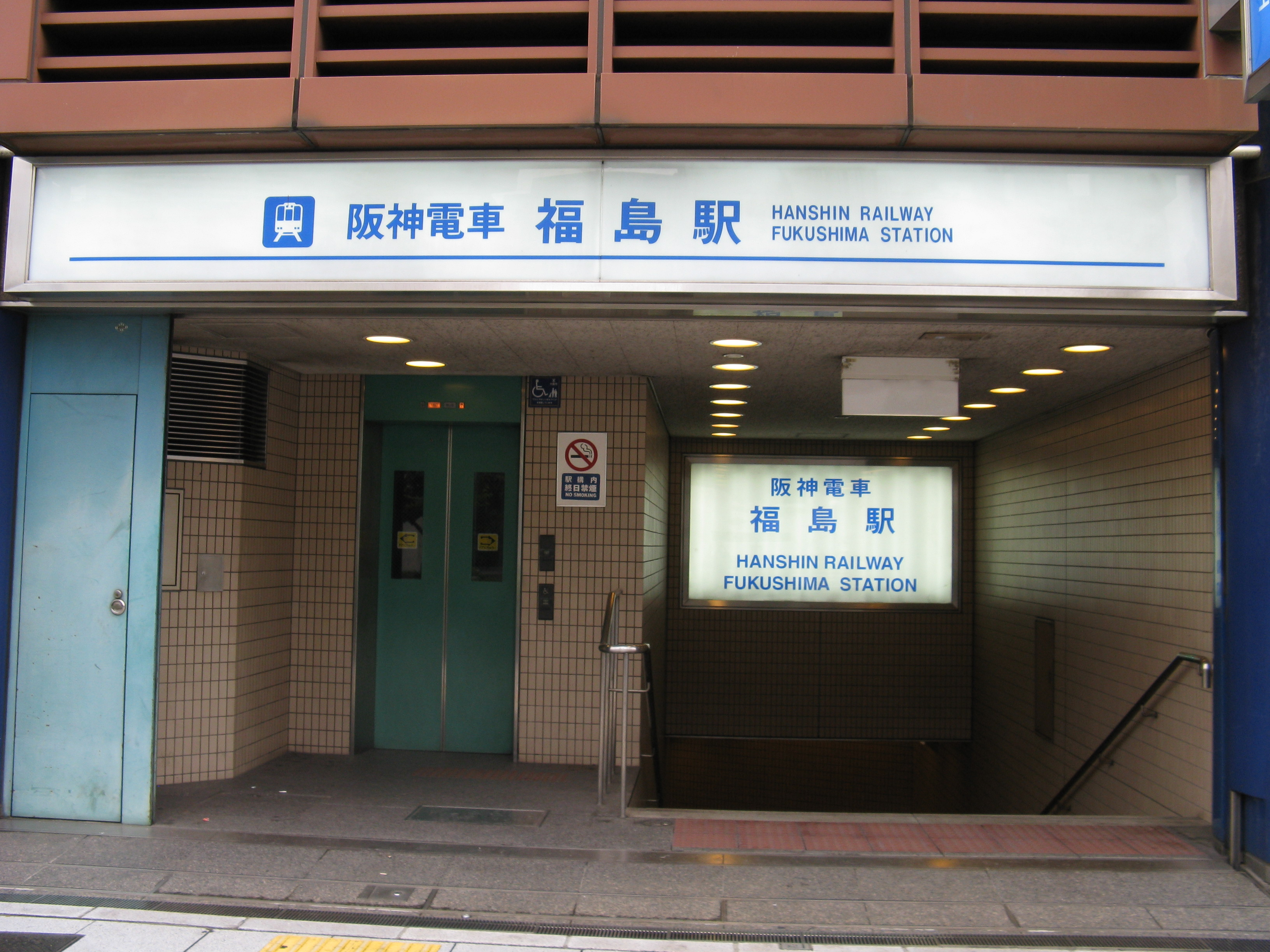
- Hanshin Railway station entrance May 2008

General information
- Operator: Hanshin Electric Railway
- Line: Hanshin Main Line

Other information
- Station code: HS 02

History
- Opened: 1905
Location

=== Platforms ===
The station consists of two underground side platforms serving two tracks.

■ Main Line	to Osaka-Umeda
■ Main Line	for Amagasaki, Koshien, Kobe Sannomiya, Akashi and Himeji

=== Adjacent stations ===
«	Service	»
Hanshin Main Line
Osaka-Umeda (HS 01)	Local	Noda (HS 03)
Osaka-Umeda (HS 01)	Morning Express	Noda (HS 03)
Express: Does not stop at this station
Morning Limited Express (Osaka-Umeda-bound trains only on weekdays): Does not stop at this station
Hanshin Limited Express; Through Limited Express: Does not stop at this station

== History ==
What is now the JR West station opened on 5 April 1898.

The Hanshin Electric Railway station opened on 12 April 1905.

== Surrounding area ==
Map of the roads and rail lines serving the Fukushima ward of Osaka.

- Shin-Fukushima Station (JR Tōzai Line)
- Nakanoshima Station (Keihan Nakanoshima Line)
- Hotel Hanshin
- Hotarumachi
  - Asahi Broadcasting Corporation
  - ABC Hall
  - Dojima River Forum
