= Kitashinchi Station =

Railway station in Osaka, Japan

Kitashinchi Station 北新地駅
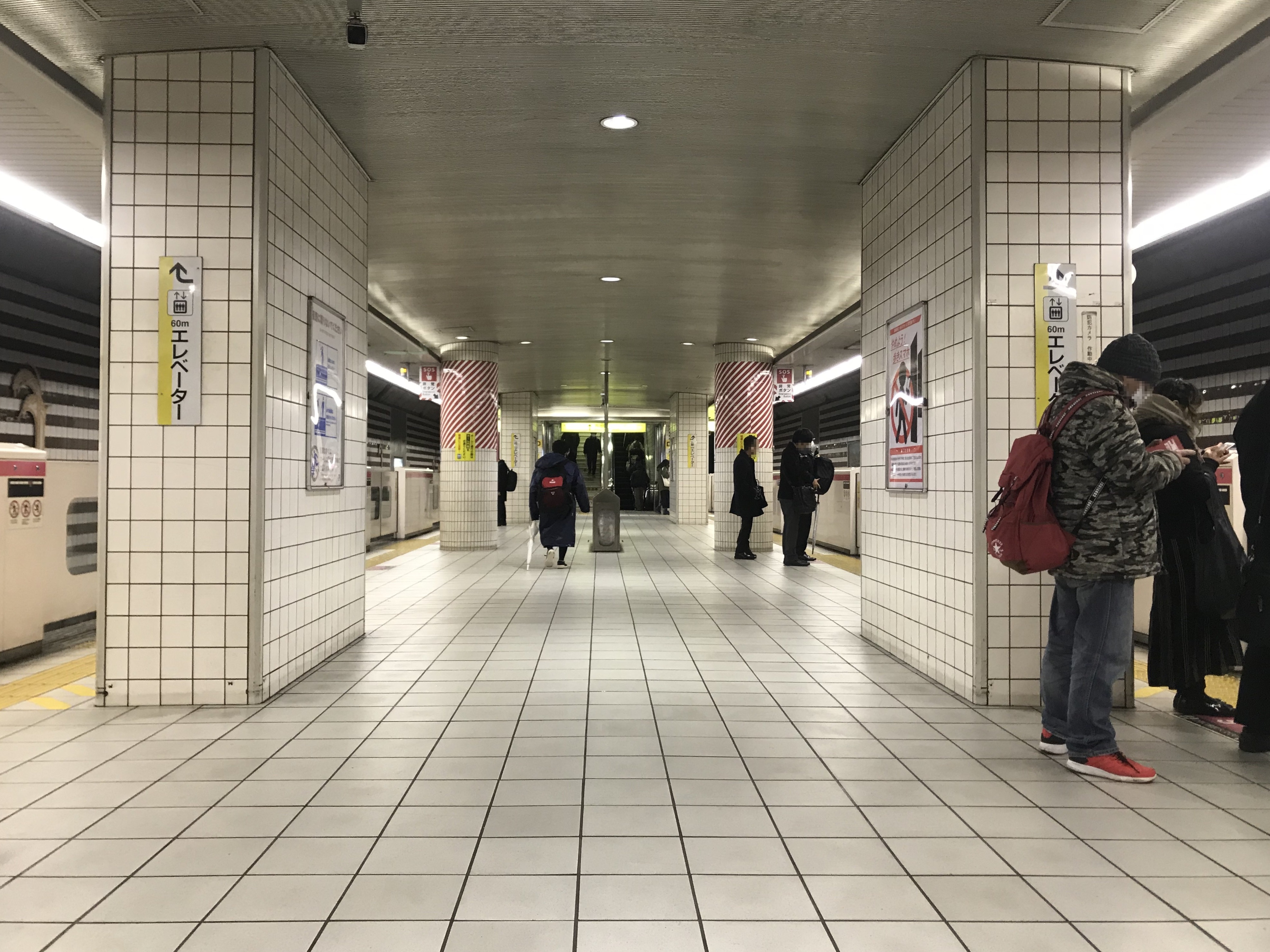
- JR Kitashinchi Station

General information
- Location: Umeda Itchome, Kita, Osaka, Osaka （大阪市北区梅田1丁目） Japan
- Coordinates: 34°41′53.96″N 135°29′49.33″E
- Operator: West Japan Railway Company
- Line: H JR Tōzai Line
- Platforms: 1 island platform
- Tracks: 2
- Connections: Bus stop; Hanshin Railway Main Line at Umeda; Osaka Metro: Yotsubashi Line at Nishi-Umeda; Midōsuji Line at Umeda; Tanimachi Line at Higashi-Umeda; Keihan Railway Nakanoshima Line at Watanabebashi

Other information
- Station code: JR-H44

History
- Opened: 1997; 29 years ago

Services
Preceding station	JR West	Following station
Shin-Fukushima towards Amagasaki	JR Tōzai Line Local Regional Rapid Service Rapid Service	Ōsakatemmangū towards Kyōbashi
Location

Kitashinchi Station (北新地駅, Kitashinchi-eki) is a railway station on the West Japan Railway (JR West) JR Tōzai Line in Kita-ku, Osaka, Japan. The station is located in the Kitashinchi dining and entertainment district of Osaka, and at 23.95 metres (78.6 ft) below sea level, it is the deepest station in the JR West system.

Although officially separated from Osaka Station, the main terminal, passengers can transfer for free from the JR Kobe Line or the Osaka Loop Line at Osaka to the Tōzai Line at Kitashinchi, and vice versa, with some tickets and passes.

== Lines ==
- JR Tōzai Line

=== Connections ===
Kitashinchi Station is connected to the following stations:

- JR West
  - Tōkaidō Main Line (JR Kyoto Line, JR Kobe Line), JR Takarazuka Line, Osaka Loop Line - Osaka Station
- Osaka Metro
  - Yotsubashi Line - Nishi-Umeda Station (Y11)
- Hanshin Electric Railway
  - Main Line - Umeda Station
- Keihan Electric Railway
  - Nakanoshima Line - Watanabebashi Station (via Dojima Underground Shopping Center)

Connections are also available to the following stations Hankyu Railway Umeda Station (approx. 15 minutes), Umeda Station on the subway Midosuji Line (approx. 10 minutes) and Higashi-Umeda Station on the subway Tanimachi Line (approx. 12 minutes).

== Layout ==
This station has an island platform serving two tracks underground. The station administrates all intermediate stations on the JR Tozai Line.

1	■ JR Tōzai Line	for Amagasaki, Takarazuka and Sannomiya
2	■ JR Tōzai Line	for Kyōbashi, Shijōnawate and Matsuiyamate

== Surroundings ==
- Kitashinchi
- Osaka Ekimae Buildings
- Diamor Osaka
- Dojima Avanza
- Dojima Underground Shopping Center (Dotica)

== History ==
Kitashinchi Station opened on 8 March 1997, coinciding with the opening of the JR Tōzai Line between Kyobashi and Amagasaki.

Station numbering was introduced in March 2018 with Kitashinchi being assigned station number JR-H44.
