= Kita-ku, Osaka =

Ward of Osaka, Japan

Coordinates: 34°42′20″N 135°30′36″E

Location of Kita-ku in Osaka City

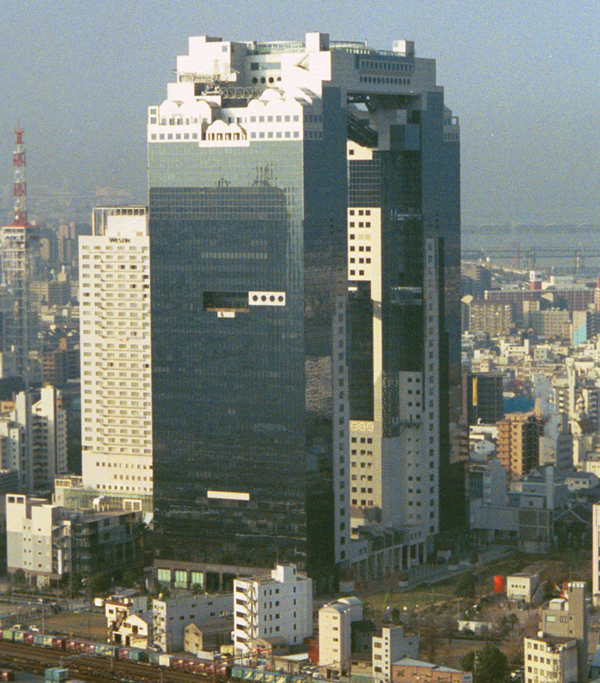
Umeda Sky Building

Kita (北区, Kita-ku) is one of 24 wards of Osaka in Japan.

== Incidents and accidents ==
- 1970 Tenroku gas explosion
- 2021 Osaka building fire

== Notable locations ==
Kita-ku, particularly the Umeda area surrounding Osaka Station, is one of the main commercial centers of Osaka. Kita-ku is also a financial administration center, housing the headquarters of the Japan Mint and the Osaka branch of the Bank of Japan.

=== Firms headquartered in Kita-ku ===
- Daicel
- Daikin (Umeda Center Building)
- Daiwa House
- FM802
- Hankyu Hanshin Holdings
- Hankyu Railway
- Kansai Electric Power Company
- Kansai Telecasting Corporation
- Kaneka Corporation
- Mainichi Broadcasting System
- Nichibutsu
- Nippon Paint
- Nipro
- Oh-Ebashi LPC & Partners
- Santen Pharmaceutical
- Suntory
- Toyobo
- West Japan Railway Company
- West Nippon Expressway Company (Dojima Avanza)
- Yanmar (Umeda Gate Tower)
- Zojirushi

Asahi Kasei, Itochu Corporation, Kuraray and Kaneka Corporation each have "headquarters" in both Kita-ku and in Tokyo.

=== Firms with branch offices in Kita-ku ===
Dentsu and Yomiuri Shimbun have branch offices in Kita-ku. Mazda has an office in the Umeda Sky Building Tower East. Air France has an office on the third and sixth floors of the Shin-Sakurabashi Building in Umeda. The office handles Aircalin-related inquiries. Google has an office in the Hankyu Grand Building in Kita-ku. Bandai Visual's Kansai Office opened in Kita-ku in March 1988; the division is now known as the Osaka Branch. Japan Airlines at one time operated a ticketing facility on the first floor of the Daiichi Seimei Building in Umeda, Kita-ku.

== Diplomatic missions ==
The Consulate-General of the United States in Osaka is located in Kita-ku. The Consulate-General of Belgium in Osaka is located on the twelfth floor of the Snow Crystal Building in Umeda, Kita-ku. The Consulate-General of Germany in Osaka is located on the thirty-fifth floor of the Umeda Sky Building Tower East in Kita-ku. The Consulate-General of Italy in Osaka is located since April 2013 on the 17th floor of the Nakanoshima Festival Tower in Nakanoshima.

== Landmarks ==
=== Umeda downtown ===
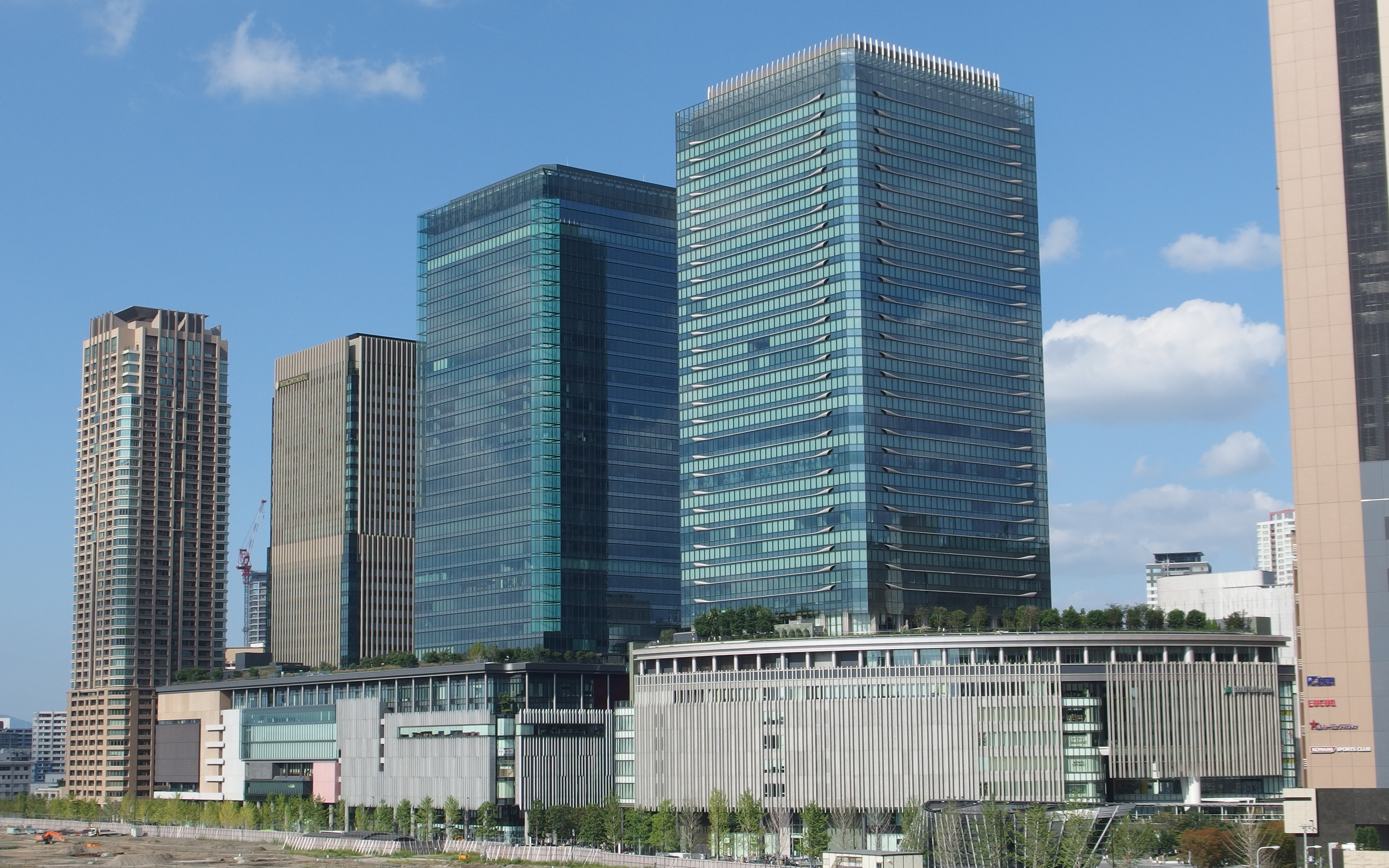
Grand Front Osaka

Commercial and business centre of Kansai region with many high-rise buildings and large underground complexes.

=== Nakanoshima island ===
Government facilities and museums, and office buildings are situated on this island. Notable establishments is City hall, Central Public Hall, Bank of Japan Osaka branch and Osaka International Convention Center. National Museum of Art, Osaka and Osaka Science Museum is also in this island.

=== Parks ===
- Nakanoshima Park
- Yodogawa riverside park and Kema-Sakuranomiya Park
- Ohgimachi Park
  - Ogimachi Kids Park (Kids Plaza Osaka)
- Sakuranomiya Park
- Minami-Temma Park
- Umeada Umekita Gardens
- Grand Green Osaka

=== Shrines and Temples ===
- Kokubun-ji (Osaka)
- Osaka Temmangu Shrine

=== Others ===
- Tenjimbashisuji Shōtengai (the longest covered shopping street in Japan)
- Festival Hall
- The South Korean government maintains the Korea Education Institution (Korean: 오사카한국교육원, Japanese: 大阪韓国教育院) in Kita-ku.

== Department stores ==
- Hanshin Department Store Umeda Main Store
- Hankyu Department Store Umeda Main Store
- Daimaru Umeda-mise

== Mass media ==
=== Newspapers ===
- Mainichi Shimbun Osaka Office – Umeda
- Yomiuri Shimbun Osaka Office – Nozakicho
- Asahi Shimbun Osaka Office – Nakanoshima

=== Broadcasting stations ===
- Mainichi Broadcasting System (MBS) – Chayamachi, TV and radio
- Asahi Broadcasting Corporation (ABC) – Oyodo-minami, TV and radio
- Kansai TV – Ogimachi, TV

== Education ==
=== High Schools ===
Kita-ku is home to Osaka Prefectural Kitano High School (大阪府立北野高等学校), a public high school operated by the Osaka Prefecture. It is widely regarded as one of the leading public high schools in both Osaka Prefecture and Japan.

=== Universities ===
- Osaka Institute of Technology (Umeda Campus)
- International Professional University of Technology in Osaka
- Osaka Health and Medical University
- International Fashion Professional University (Osaka Campus)
- Takarazuka University (Osaka Umeda Campus)

=== International schools ===
- Osaka YMCA International School

== Railway stations ==
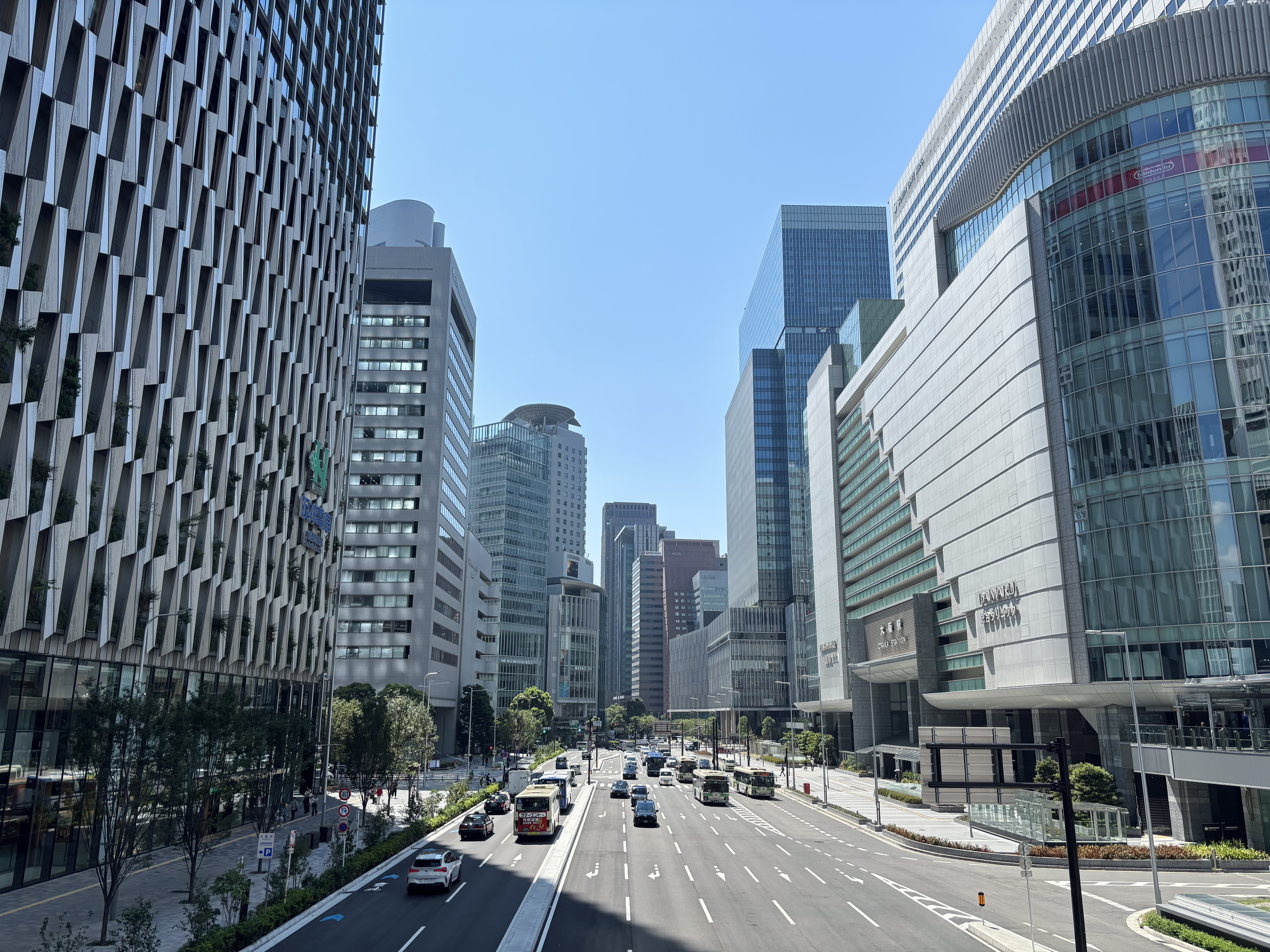
South of Osaka Station in Umeda

Terminals:

- Osaka Station (JR West)
- Umeda Station (Hankyu, Hanshin, Osaka Subway)
- Yodoyabashi Station (Keihan, Osaka Subway)

The following stations are also connected to Osaka and Umeda by underground passageways:

- Kitashinchi Station (JR West)
- Higashi-Umeda Station (Osaka Subway)
- Nishi-Umeda Station (Osaka Subway)

Other stations in Kita-ku:

- Minami-morimachi Station (Osaka Subway)
- Nakatsu Station (Hankyu)
- Nakatsu Station (Osaka Subway)
- Nakazakicho Station (Osaka Subway)
- Ogimachi Station (Osaka Subway)
- Osaka-Temmangu Station (JR West)
- Tenjimbashisuji Rokuchōme Station (Hankyu, Osaka Subway)
- Temma Station (JR West)

== Notable people from Kita-ku, Osaka ==
- Yasunari Kawabata - Japanese writer, 1968 Nobel Prize in Literature winner
- Etsuko Inada – Japanese figure skater
- Kagaku Murakami – Japanese painter and illustrator
- Kenta Kiritani – Japanese actor and singer
- Tetsuji Takechi – Japanese theatrical and film director, critic, and author
- Emiko Yagumo – Japanese silent film actress
