= Minami-Temma Park =

Public urban park

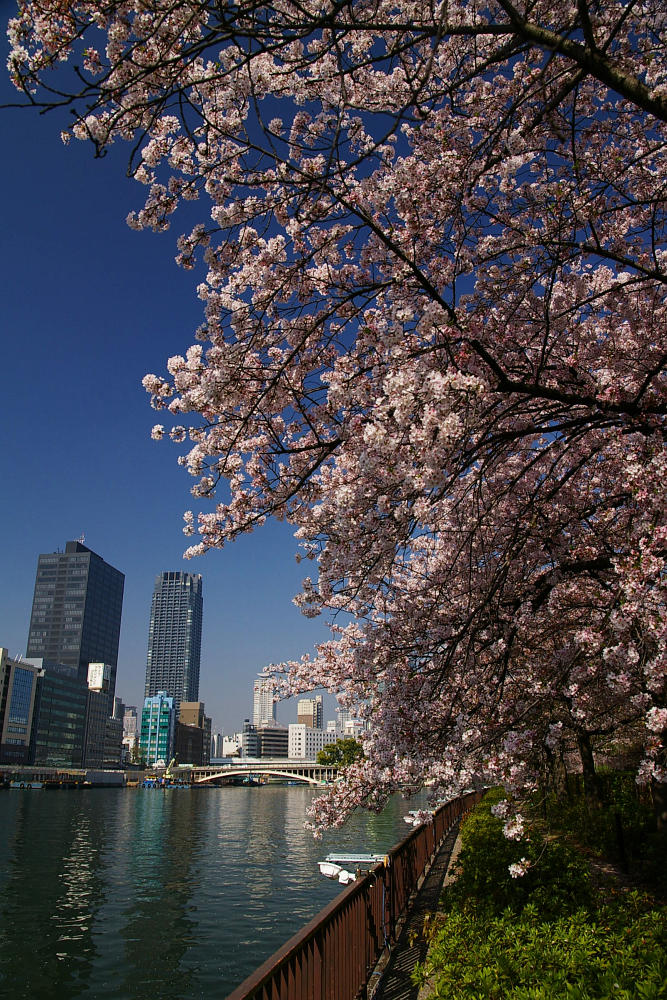
- Kyū-Yodo River and cherry blossom
- Interactive map of Minami-Temma Park
- Type: Urban park
- Location: Kita ward, Osaka City
- Coordinates: 34.691879°N 135.514528°E
- Area: 2.1430 hectares (5.295 acres)
- Operator: Osaka city
- Status: Open all year

Minami-Temma Park (南天満公園, Minami-Temma-Kōen) is a public urban park situated at 1 chōme Tenjimbashi in Kita-ku, Osaka, Japan. It lies on the north side of the Ōkawa (Kyū-Yodo River) between Temma-bashi bridge and Tenjim-bashi bridge.

The park was constructed at the former Temma-Aomono-Ichiba vegetable wholesale market. Now, this park is a popular place for cherry blossom viewing in spring along the Kyū-Yodo River. The cherry blossom promenade is also a cycle path, which continues to northern Osaka (Suita City).

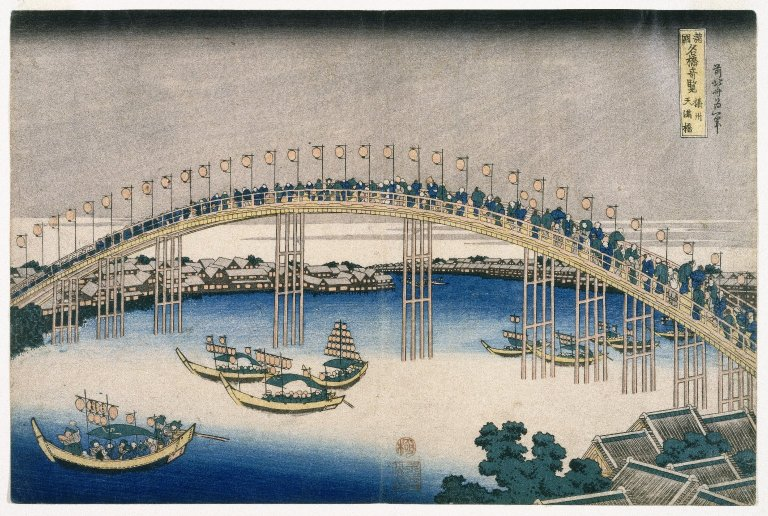
Brooklyn Museum - The Festival of Lanterns on Temma Bridge - Katsushika Hokusai

== Facilities ==
- Minami-Temma tennis court

Three grass (hard) courts

- Tenjimbashi Kita Kōban (police substation)
- Monuments

- Monument of Temma old songs
- Monument of Edo era, Yodo River 50 Koku boat songs
- Monument of vegetable wholesale market

== Activities in the park ==
- cherry blossom viewing : April

== Access ==
Temmabashi Station of Keihan Railway is nearest.

== Photographs ==
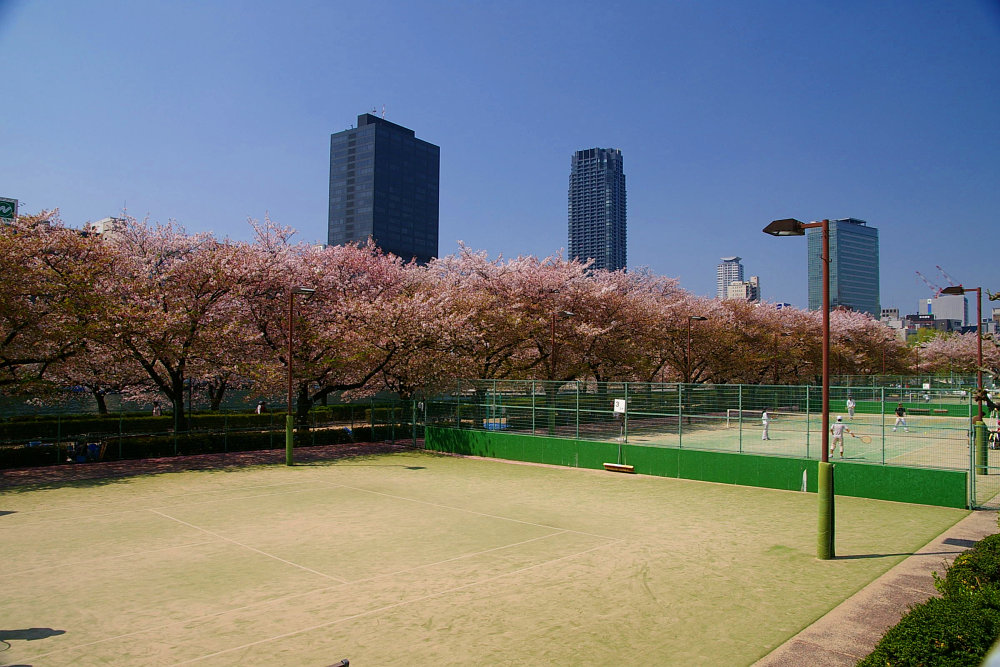
Tennis court

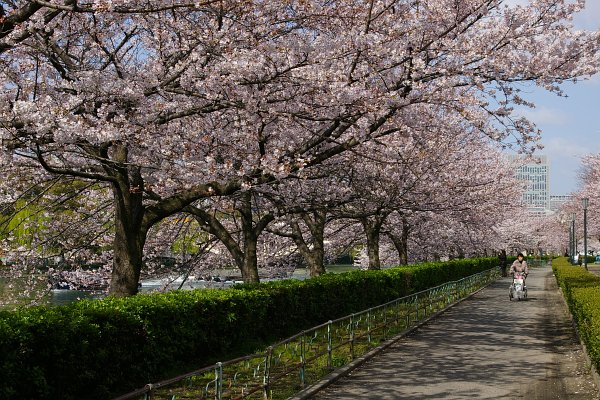
cherry blossom promenade

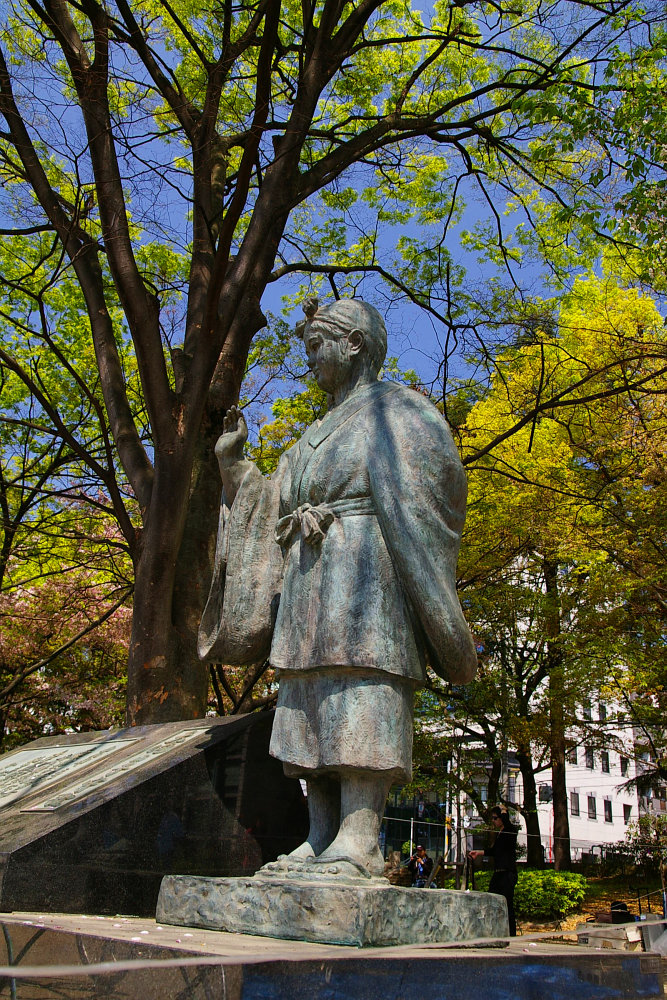
Temma old songs monument

== See also ==
- Nakanoshima Park: west of this park
- Sakuranomiya Park: east of this park
- Osaka Castle Park
