= Kyū-Yodo River =

Major waterway in central Osaka

Location
- Country: Osaka City, Japan

Physical characteristics
- Source
  - location: Yodo River, at Kema Lock
  - coordinates: 34°43′15″N 135°30′59″E
- Mouth
  - location: Osaka Bay, at Tempozan
  - coordinates: 34°39′31″N 135°25′51″E
  - elevation: 0 m (0 ft)
- Length: 13.83 km (8.59 mi)

The Kyū-Yodo River (旧淀川, Kyū-Yodo-gawa) was the main stream of the Yodo River before 1907, when the current (new) Yodo River was constructed by a normalisation project. Now called the Kyū-Yodo River, it is a major waterway in central Osaka and the main drainage of Neyagawa river.

The name Kyū-Yodo river means former Yodo river in Japanese.

== Subdivisions ==
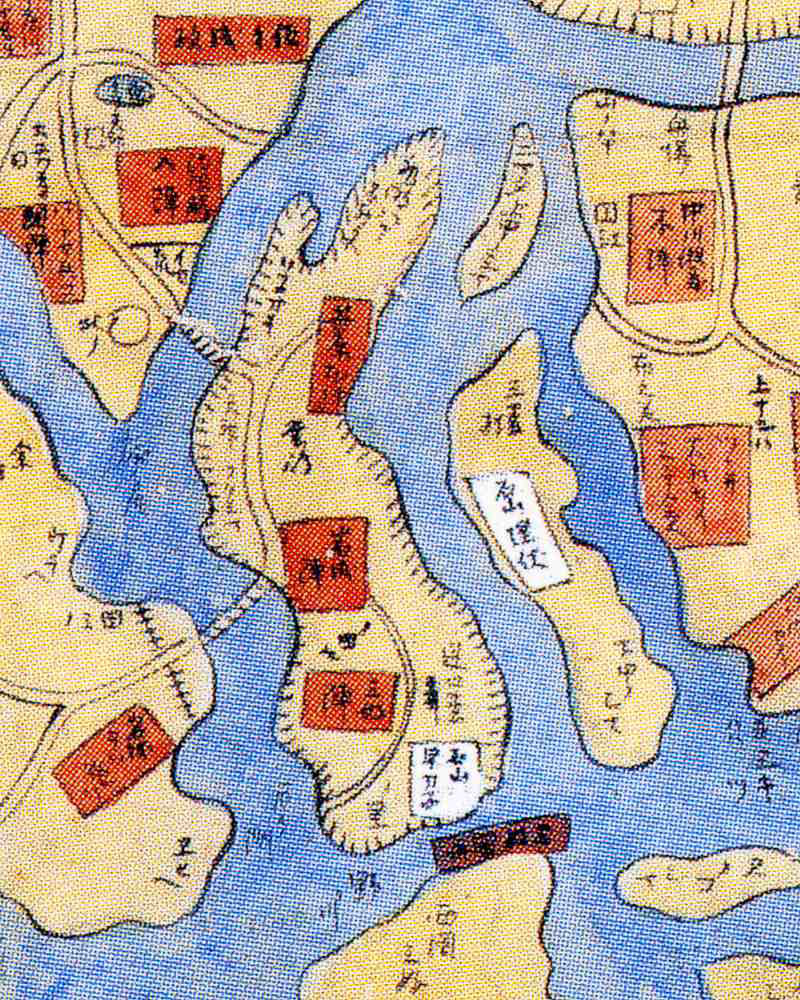
Map of the Dojima River section of the then-Yodo River around 1570

The name Kyū-Yodo River is a geological name, locally it is called by subdivision names. From the source to the mouth, it is named as follows:

=== Ōkawa (river) ===
This is the name for the section from the Kema Lock to the Tenjimbashi (bridge); the Japanese name is Ōkawa (大川).

=== Dōjima River ===
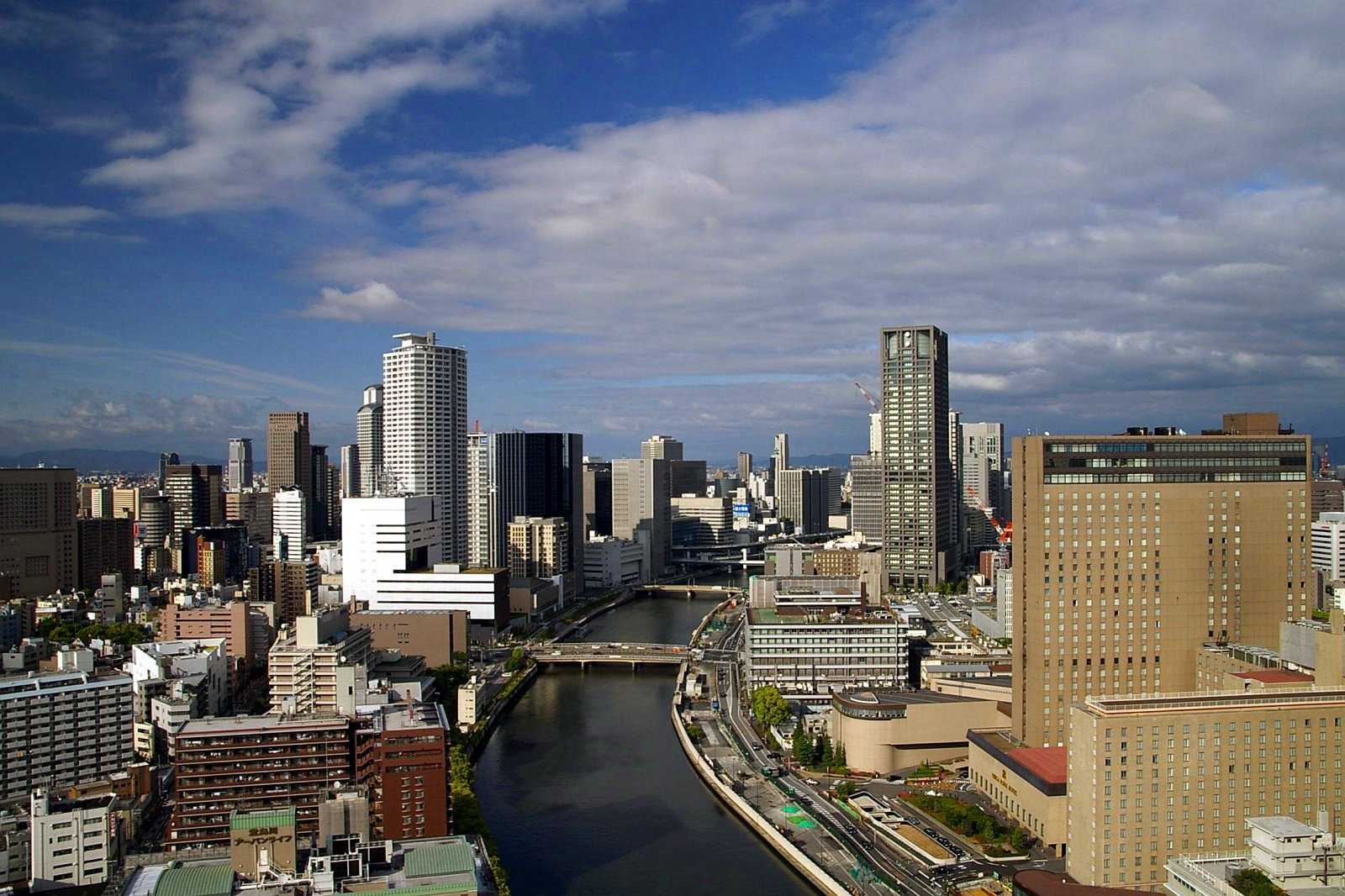
Dojima River

This is the name for the section from the Tenjimbashi (bridge) to the Funatsubashi (bridge) along the north shore of Nakanoshima Island; the Japanese name is Dōjima-gawa (堂島川).

=== Tosabori River ===
This is the name for the section from the Tenjimbashi (bridge) to the Funatsubashi (bridge) along the south shore of Nakanoshima Island; the Japanese name is Tosabori-gawa (土佐堀川).

=== Ajigawa (river) ===
This is the name for the section from the Funatsubashi (bridge) to Tempōzan, Osaka Bay; the Japanese name is Aji-gawa (安治川).

== Points of interest ==
Points of interest from the source to the mouth.

Kita ward, Miyakojima ward

- Yodo River
- Kema Lock
- Kema Sakuranomiya Park
- OAP Tower
- Imperial Hotel Osaka
- National Mint Factory

Kita ward, Chūō ward

- Keihan City Mall (department store)
- Minami-Temma Park
- Nakanoshima
- Nakanoshima Park
- Osaka Stock Exchange
- Museum of Oriental Ceramics
- City Hall
- High District Court Osaka branch
- Bank of Japan Osaka branch

Fukushima ward, Kita ward, Nishi ward

- Hotarumachi
- National Museum of Art, Osaka
- Osaka Science Museum
- Rihga Royal Hotel
- Osaka International Convention Center
- Osaka Central Wholesale Market

Konohana ward, Minato ward

- Universal Studios Japan
- Osaka Aquarium Kaiyukan
- Tempōzan

== Access ==
For Nakanoshima area, each station of Keihan Nakanoshima Line is nearest. For Osaka Aquarium Kaiyukan and Tempōzan, Metro Ōsakakō Station is nearest.
