= Naniwabashi Station =

Railway station in Osaka, Japan

Naniwabashi Station なにわ橋駅
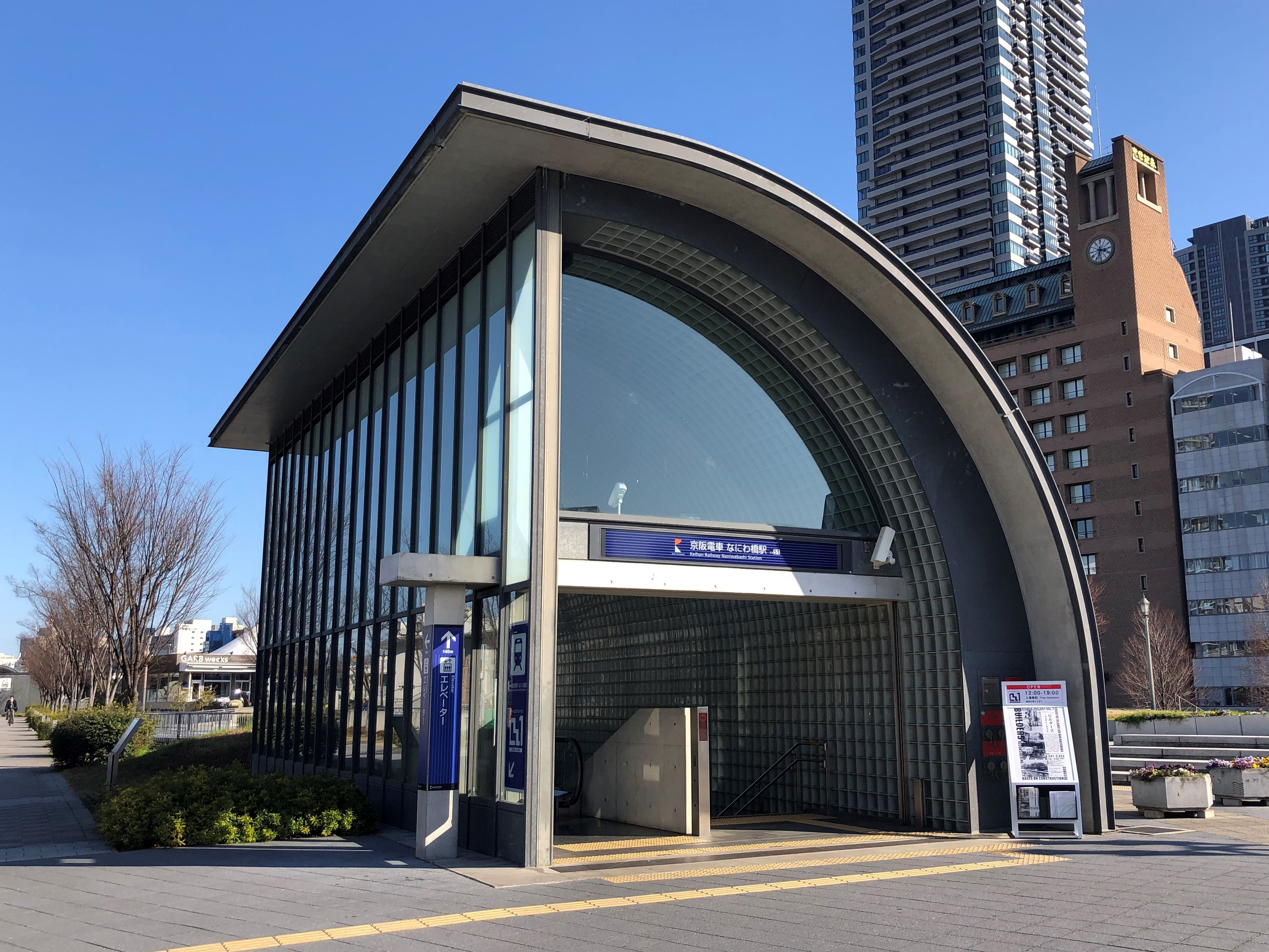
- Exit of Naniwabashi station

General information
- Location: Nakanoshima Itchome, Kita, Osaka, Osaka （大阪市北区中之島一丁目） Japan
- Coordinates: 34°41′35″N 135°30′21″E
- Operator: Keihan Electric Railway
- Line: Nakanoshima Line
- Platforms: 2

Construction
- Structure type: Underground

History
- Opened: 2008
Location

Naniwabashi Station (なにわ橋駅) is a railway station on the Keihan Nakanoshima Line in Kita-ku, Osaka, Japan. It opened on October 19, 2008 (the day of the opening of the Nakanoshima Line).

== Station layout ==
The station consists of an underground island platform serving two tracks.

1	■ Nakanoshima Line	for Kyōbashi, Hirakatashi, Chushojima, Sanjō and Demachiyanagi (via Keihan Main Line)
2	■ Nakanoshima Line	for Nakanoshima

== Surroundings ==
- Naniwa Bridge
- Kitahama Station (Keihan Main Line, Osaka Municipal Subway Sakaisuji Line)
- Nakanoshima Park
- Osaka Prefectural Nakanoshima Library
- The Museum of Oriental Ceramics, Osaka
- Osaka Central Public Hall
- Temma-Tenjin Hanjotei
- Osaka High Court, Osaka District Court, Osaka Summary Court
- Osaka Bar Association

== Adjacent stations ==
«	Service	»
Keihan Railway Nakanoshima Line
Ōebashi	All types	Temmabashi
