= Nakanoshima Park =

Public park in Osaka, Japan

Coordinates: 34.693056°N 135.506431°E

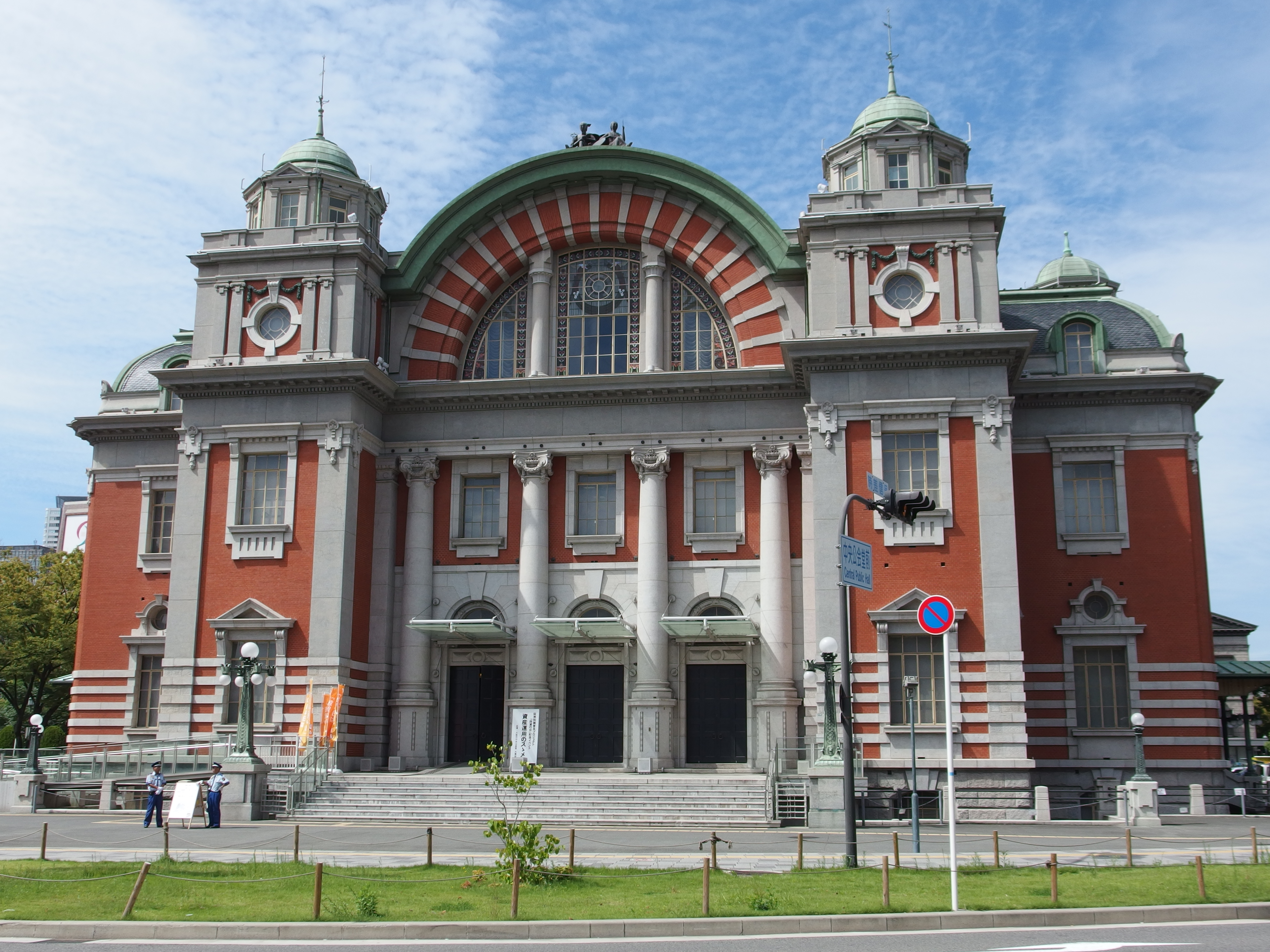
Osaka Central Public Hall

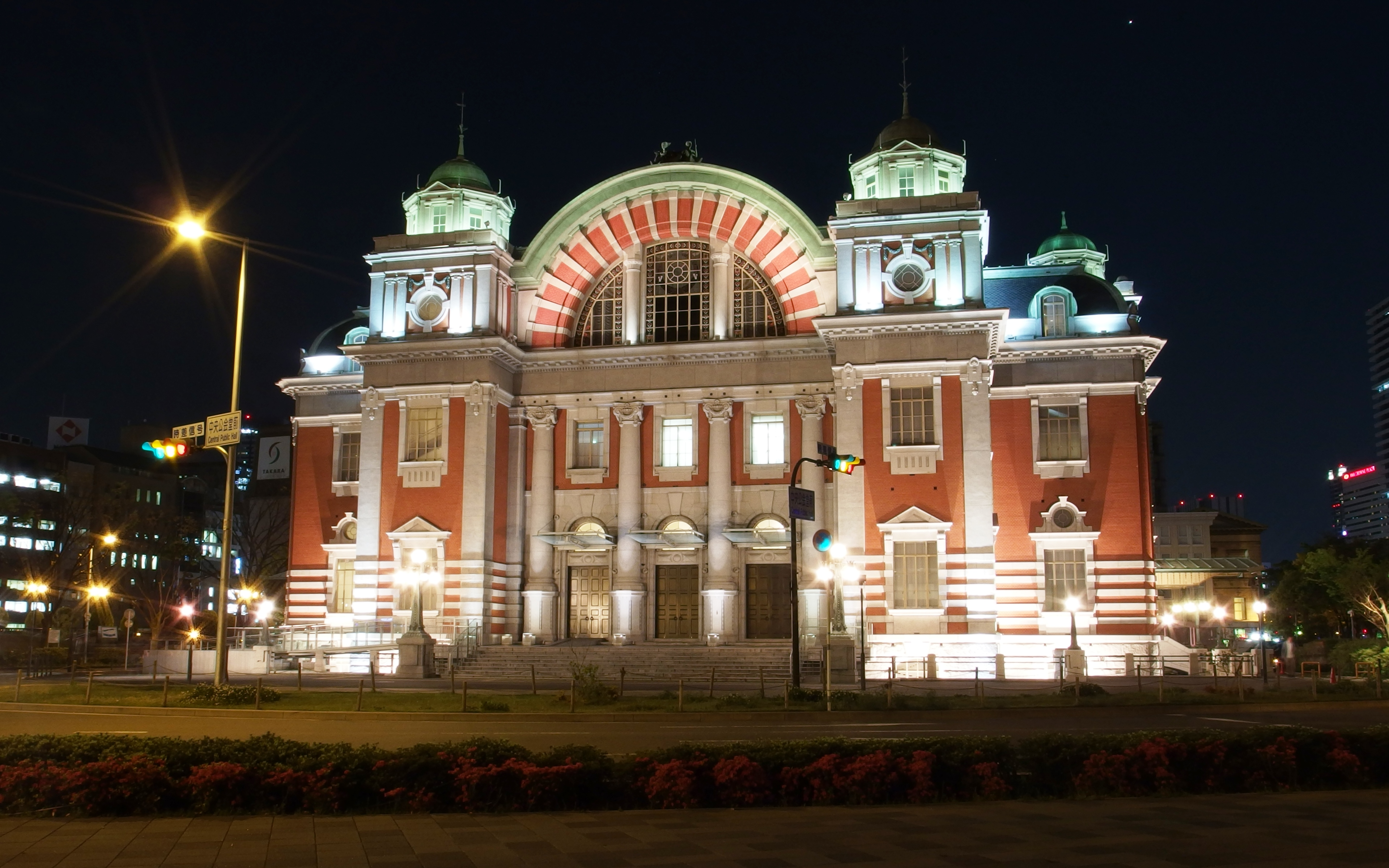
Osaka Central Public Hall at night

The Nakanoshima Park (中之島公園, Nakanoshima kōen) is the first public park opened by Osaka in 1891, after its foundation as a city. It is located in Kita ward, on the Nakanoshima sandbank, lying between Dōjima and Tosabori Rivers. The 11 hectare park houses public facilities such as Osaka Central Public Hall (built in 1918), Osaka Prefectural Nakanoshima Library and Museum of Oriental Ceramics. It also holds a rose garden. The City Hall of Osaka building is located on its west end.

== Train stations ==
- Kitahama Station (Keihan Railway Keihan Line, Osaka Municipal Subway Sakaisuji Line)
- Naniwabashi Station (Keihan Railway Nakanoshima Line)
- Yodoyabashi Station (Keihan Railway Keihan Line, Osaka Municipal Subway Midosuji Line)
- Ōebashi Station (Keihan Railway Nakanoshima Line)
- Higobashi Station (Osaka Municipal Subway Yotsubashi Line)
- Watanabebashi Station (Keihan Railway Nakanoshima Line)

== Establishments ==
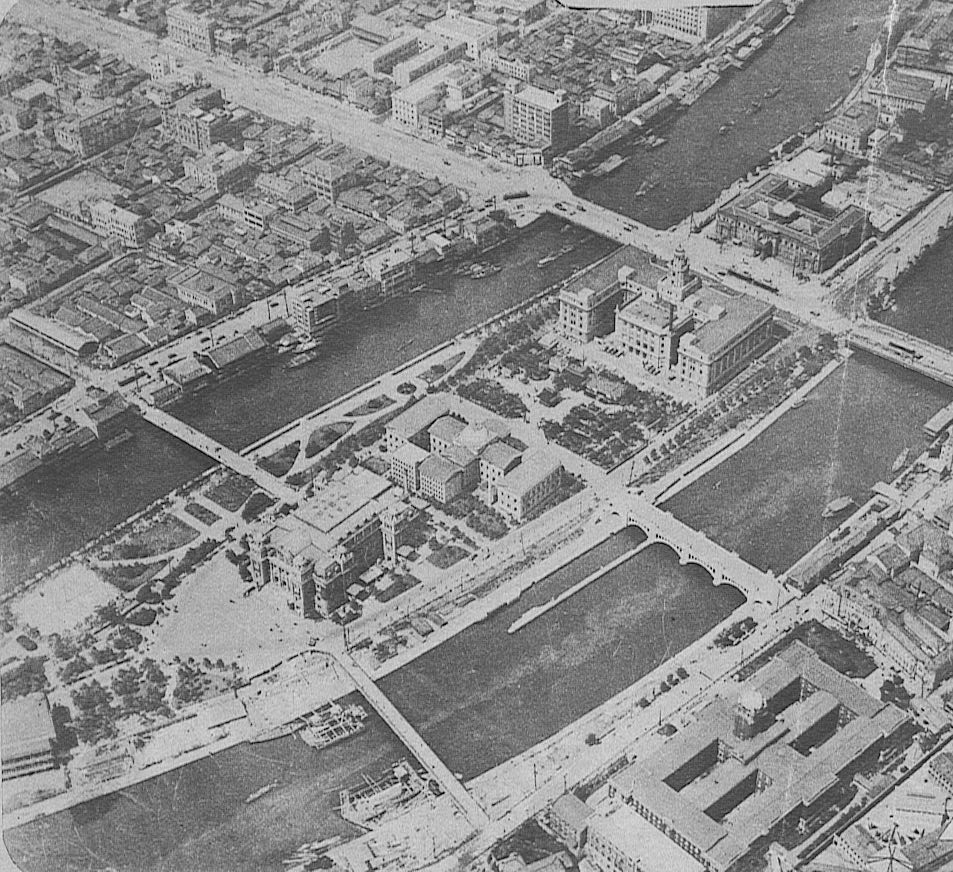
Nakanoshima and its park, part of which is seen towards the left in the central delta. The first building at the extreme left in the delta is the public hall, followed in order toward the right by the city public library, the city hall and the Osaka branch of the Bank of Japan. The street in front of the bank is part of the Mido-Suji -- 1930.

- Osaka Central Public Hall: Established in 1918, it is Neo-Renaissance architecture. A nationally Important Cultural Property.
- Osaka Prefectural Nakanoshima Library: Established in 1904, it is Neo-Baroque Architecture. A nationally Important Cultural Property.
- Bank of Japan Osaka branch.
- Museum of Oriental Ceramics: Established by donation from Ataka family (They were trader.)
