= Osaka Science Museum =

Science museum in Japan

Coordinates: 34.69124°N 135.49152°E

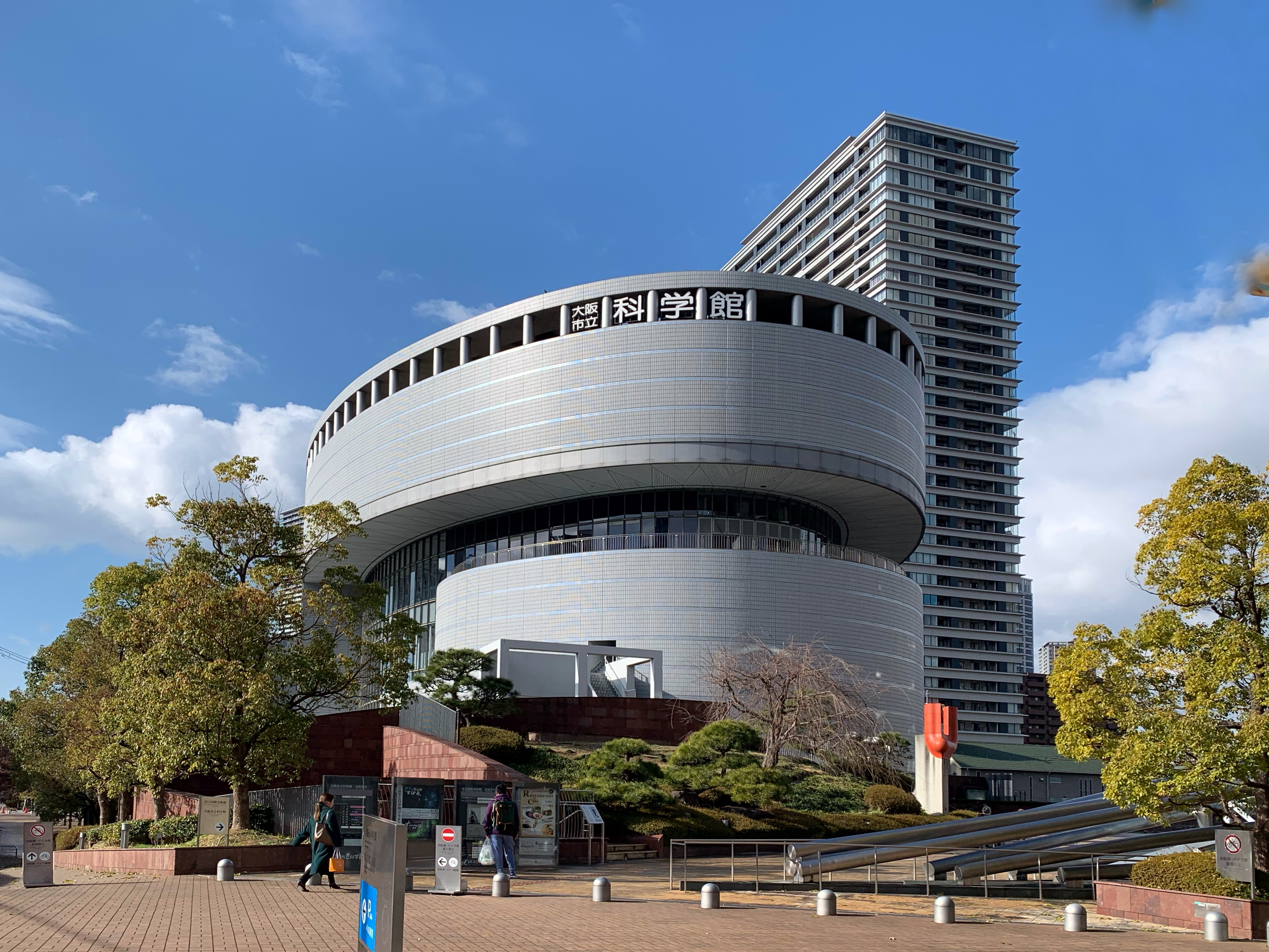
The exterior of the museum

The Osaka Science Museum (大阪市立科学館, Ōsaka Shiritsu Kagakukan) is a science museum in Naka-no-shima, Kita-ku, Osaka, Japan. The museum is located between the Dōjima River and the Tosabori River, above Osaka's subterranean National Museum of Art. Opened in 1989, the museum was constructed to mark the 100th anniversary of Osaka City. The construction was funded through a 6.5 billion yen donation toward building costs from Kansai Electric. Its theme is "The Universe and Energy". Before the war a similar museum opened in 1937. It was known as the Osaka City Electricity Science Museum and it was both the first science museum and the first planetarium in Japan.

The Science Museum's primary permanent exhibition consists of four floors of mainly interactive science exhibits, totaling 200 items, with each floor focusing on a different theme. There is also a live science show with science demonstrations several times per day. Like the rest of the museum, these demonstrations are in Japanese only and visitors may require prior scientific knowledge to enjoy them.

The two secondary exhibits, both available separately from the primary exhibit, are a planetarium, which has a dome with a radius of 26.5 meters, the 7th largest in the world which projects the images of the heavens. In July 2004, the planetarium reopened after a renovation displaying the entire night sky as a next-generation digital image.

The museum also houses a collection of scientific resources, including

- Japan's first planetarium (a Carl Zeiss II model)
- the Cockcroft-Walton accelerator
- resources related to Seimikyoku, Japan's first full-fledged chemistry laboratory
- pre-war electrical measuring devices

Its collection of books and magazines for a general audience, largely on astronomy, is the most comprehensive in West Japan.

The science building is the place where Hideki Yukawa created his theory on mesons, for which he was awarded a Nobel Prize. At the time this building was part of Osaka University. It was also the first place in Japan where radio waves from the universe were measured.

== Construction history ==
- Founded— 1989
- Completed— 1989
- Design— Takenaka Corporation
- Total floor area— 8,920.79m²
- Address— 4–2–1, Naka-no-shima, Kita-ku, Osaka-shi, Osaka-fu 530–0005

== Curatorial history ==
- Tadao Nakano (first curator, former Osaka City University professor)
- Noriaki Takahashi (former Osaka University professor)
- Kenichi Kato (former)
- Yoshihiko Saito(current)

== Hours of operation ==
The Science Museum's official hours of operation are 9:30 to 17:00. It is closed on Mondays, but makes exceptions for national holidays. It is also closed for maintenance between December 28 and January 4.

== Transport access ==
- Keihan Electric Railway Nakanoshima Line Watanabebashi Station — Around 300m west
- Osaka Municipal Subway Yotsubashi Line Higobashi Station — Around 500m west
- Hanshin Electric Railway Main Line Fukushima Station — Around 800m south
- West Japan Railway Company JR Tōzai Line Shin-Fukushima Station — Around 800m south
- Osaka Municipal Subway Midosuji Line and Keihan Electric Railway Keihan Line Yodoyabashi Station — Around 900m west
- West Japan Railway Company Osaka Loop Line Fukushima Station — Around 900m south
- Osaka Municipal Bus Taminobashi stop
  - 10 minutes from Osaka Station on Route 53 or 75
- Osaka Municipal Bus Tosabori Itchōme stop
  - 10 minutes from Osaka Station on Route 88
  - 5 minutes from Yodoyabashi Station on Route 88
- Hokko Kanko Bus Osaka Science Museum / the National Museum of Art, Osaka stop
  - 10 minutes from Yodoyabashi Station on Nakanoshima Loop Bus
- Hanshin Expressway Nakanoshima-nishi Exit / Tosabori Exit / Fukushima Exit

== Information on the surrounding area ==
- National Museum of Art, Osaka
- Kansai Electric
- United Church of Christ in Japan Osaka Church
- Daibiru
- Rihga Royal Hotel
- Osaka International Convention Center
- Museum of Oriental Ceramics, Osaka
- Osaka Nakano-shima Government Building

== Related items ==
- Gakutensoku
- OSTEC Exhibition Hall

== Sources ==
Much of this article was translated from the equivalent article in the Japanese Wikipedia, as retrieved on November 22, 2006.
