= Osaka Suijō Bus =

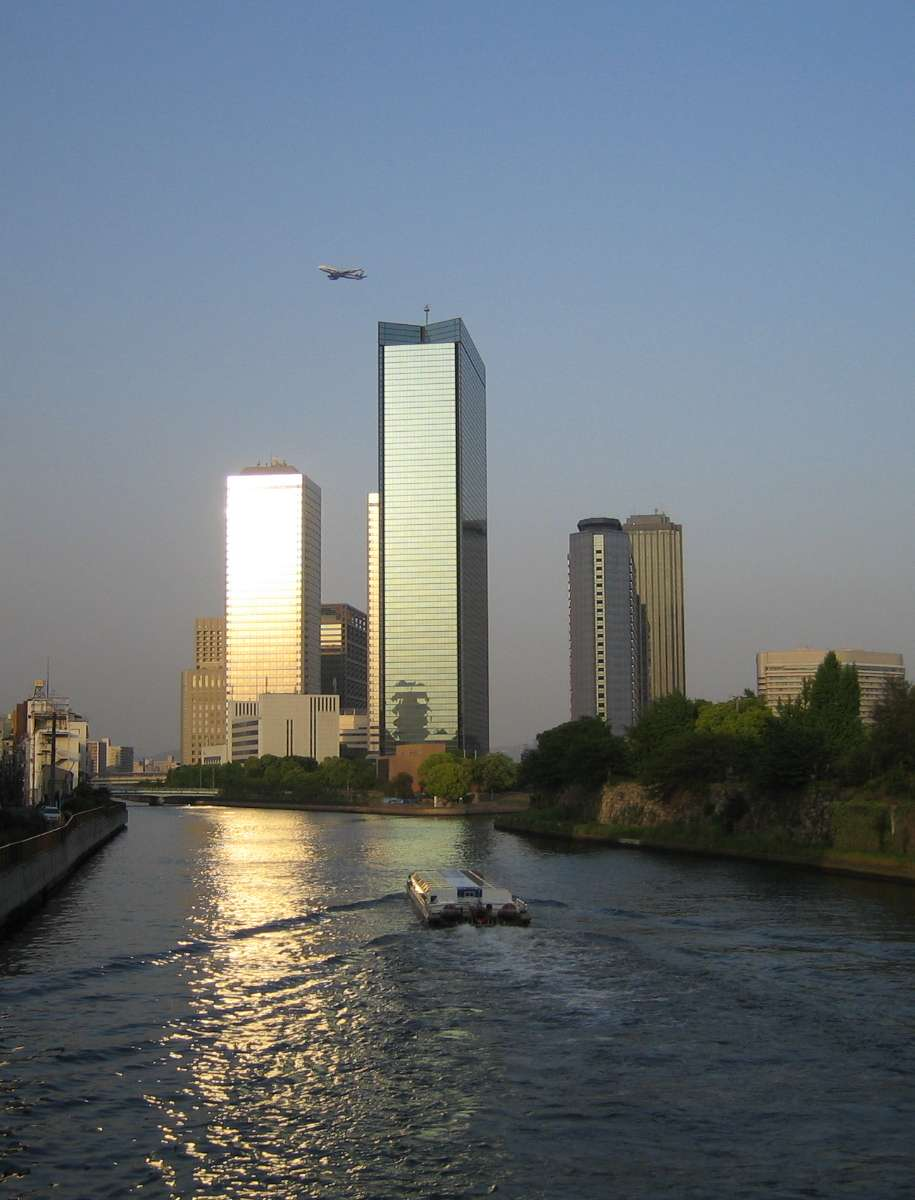
- Aqualiner in front of Osaka Business Park
- Locale: Osaka, Osaka, Japan
- Waterway: Ōkawa River, Dōtonbori Canal, Port of Osaka
- Transit type: Water bus and excursion cruise ship
- Operator: Osaka Suijō Bus
- No. of lines: 2 water bus lines and 3 excursion courses
- No. of vessels: 5 water buses, 2 excursion cruise ships
- No. of terminals: 7

The Osaka Suijō Bus (大阪水上バス, Ōsaka Suijō Basu) is a ship operating company in Osaka. The company belongs to Keihan Group. Founded in 1983, the company operates water buses on Ōkawa River and Dōtonbori Canal, an excursion cruise ship on the Port of Osaka, and a restaurant ship on Ōkawa River. The services include public lines listed below, as well as event cruises and chartered ships. The company once operated commuter ships as well, but the service was cancelled in 2005.

== Lines ==
Arrows (→) indicate ships only go that direction. Dashes (—) indicate ships go both directions.

- Aqualiner (アクアライナー, Akua Rainā) (water bus)
  - Ōsakajō → Temmabashi → Yodoyabashi → OAP → Ōsakajō

Operated every day.

- Aqua Mini (アクアmini, Akua Mini) (small water bus)
  - Ōsakajō — Dazaemonbashi — Minatomachi

Operated on weekends/holidays of spring and summer.

- Himawari (ひまわり) (restaurant ship)
  - OAP → (Ōkawa River) → OAP

There are three courses: Lunch Cruise (takes 80 minutes), Afternoon Cruise (50 minutes), and Dinner Cruise (90 minutes). Closed on Mondays during the off seasons, and between early January and early February.

- Santa Maria (サンタマリア) (excursion cruise ship)
  - Kaiyūkan Aquarium West → (Port of Osaka) → Kaiyūkan Aquarium West

There are Day Cruise (takes 50 minutes) and Night Cruise (105 minutes). Operated every day.

== Ships ==
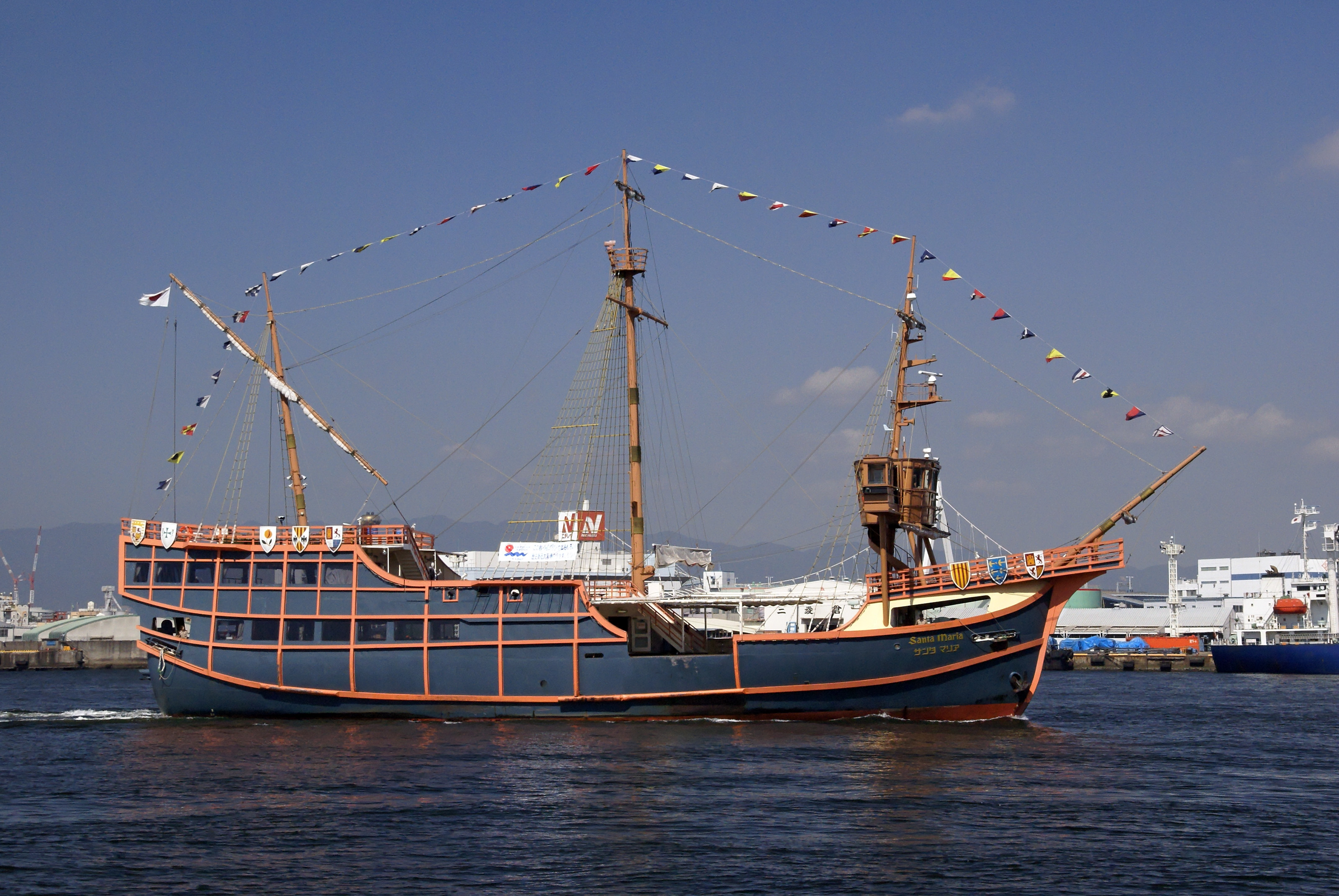
Santa Maria, off shore Osaka Aquarium Kaiyūkan.

- Aqualiners (Water bus)
  - Naniwa 2 (なにわ2号, Naniwa Ni-gō)
  - Naniwa 3 (なにわ3号, Naniwa San-gō)
  - Naniwa 5 (なにわ5号, Naniwa Go-gō)
- Aqua Mini boats (Small water bus)
  - Suito-gō Aqua Mini 1 (水都号 アクアmini 1号, Suito-gō Akua Mini Ichi-gō)
  - Suito-gō Aqua Mini 2 (水都号 アクアmini 2号, Suito-gō Akua Mini Ni-gō)
- Himawari (ひまわり) (Restaurant ship)

A restaurant ship, meaning a cruise ship mainly made for its restaurant cruise service.

- Santa Maria (サンタマリア) (Excursion cruise ship / restaurant ship)

A ship modeled after Santa María, a sailing ship of Christopher Columbus, albeit 2 times larger.

== Stations ==
Name	Japanese	Transfers	Facilities	Location (All in Osaka)
Ōsakajō	大阪城	JR: ■ Osaka Loop Line (5 min. walk from Osakajōkōen); Osaka Municipal Subway: ■ Nagahori Tsurumi-ryokuchi Line (7 min. walk from Osaka Business Park, N21)	Osaka-jo Hall, Osaka Castle, Osaka Business Park	Chūō
Temmabashi	天満橋	Keihan: Main Line (4 min. walk from Temmabashi); Osaka Municipal Subway: ■ Tanimachi Line (4 min. walk from Temmabashi, T22)	Osaka Prefectural Government	Chūō
Yodoyabashi	淀屋橋	Keihan: Main Line (In front of Yodoyabashi), Nakanoshima Line (Under construction, 5 min. walk from Ōebashi); Osaka Municipal Subway: ■ Midōsuji Line (In front of Yodoyabashi, M17), ■ Sakaisuji Line (8 min. walk from Kitahama, K14), ■ Yotsubashi Line (9 min. walk from Higobashi, Y12)	Yodoyabashi, Osaka City Hall, Bank of Japan Osaka Branch	Chūō
OAP	OAP	JR: ■ Osaka Loop Line (8 min. walk from Sakuranomiya)	Osaka Amenity Park	Kita
Dazaemonbashi	太左衛門橋	JR: ■ Yamatoji Line (9 min. walk from JR Namba); Kintetsu: Namba Line (6 min. walk from Kintetsu Namba, or 7 min. walk from Kintetsu Nippombashi); Nankai: ■ Kōya Line, ■ Main Line (Both 7 min. walk from Namba); Osaka Municipal Subway: ■ Midōsuji Line (7 min. walk from Namba, M20), ■ Sakaisuji Line (7 min. walk from Nippombashi, K17), ■ Sennichimae Line (7 min. walk from Namba, S16, or 7 min. walk from Nippombashi, S17), ■ Yotsubashi Line (7 min. walk from Namba, Y15)	Namba, Dōtonbori Bridge	Chūō
Minatomachi	湊町	JR: ■ Yamatoji Line (5 min. walk from JR Namba); Kintetsu: Namba Line (6 min. walk from Kintetsu Namba); Nankai: ■ Kōya Line, ■ Main Line (Both 7 min. walk from Namba); Osaka Municipal Subway: ■ Midōsuji Line (M20), ■ Sennichimae Line (S16), ■ Yotsubashi Line (Y15) (All 7 min. walk from Namba)	Osaka City Air Terminal, Minatomachi River Place	Naniwa
Kaiyūkan Aquarium West	海遊館 西	Capt. Line; Osaka Municipal Subway: ■ Chūō Line (8 min. walk from Ōsakakō, C11)	Tempōzan Harbor Village (Osaka Aquarium Kaiyūkan), Universal Studios Japan	Minato

== See also ==
- Water taxi
