= Ōebashi Station =

Railway station in Osaka, Japan

Ōebashi Station 大江橋駅
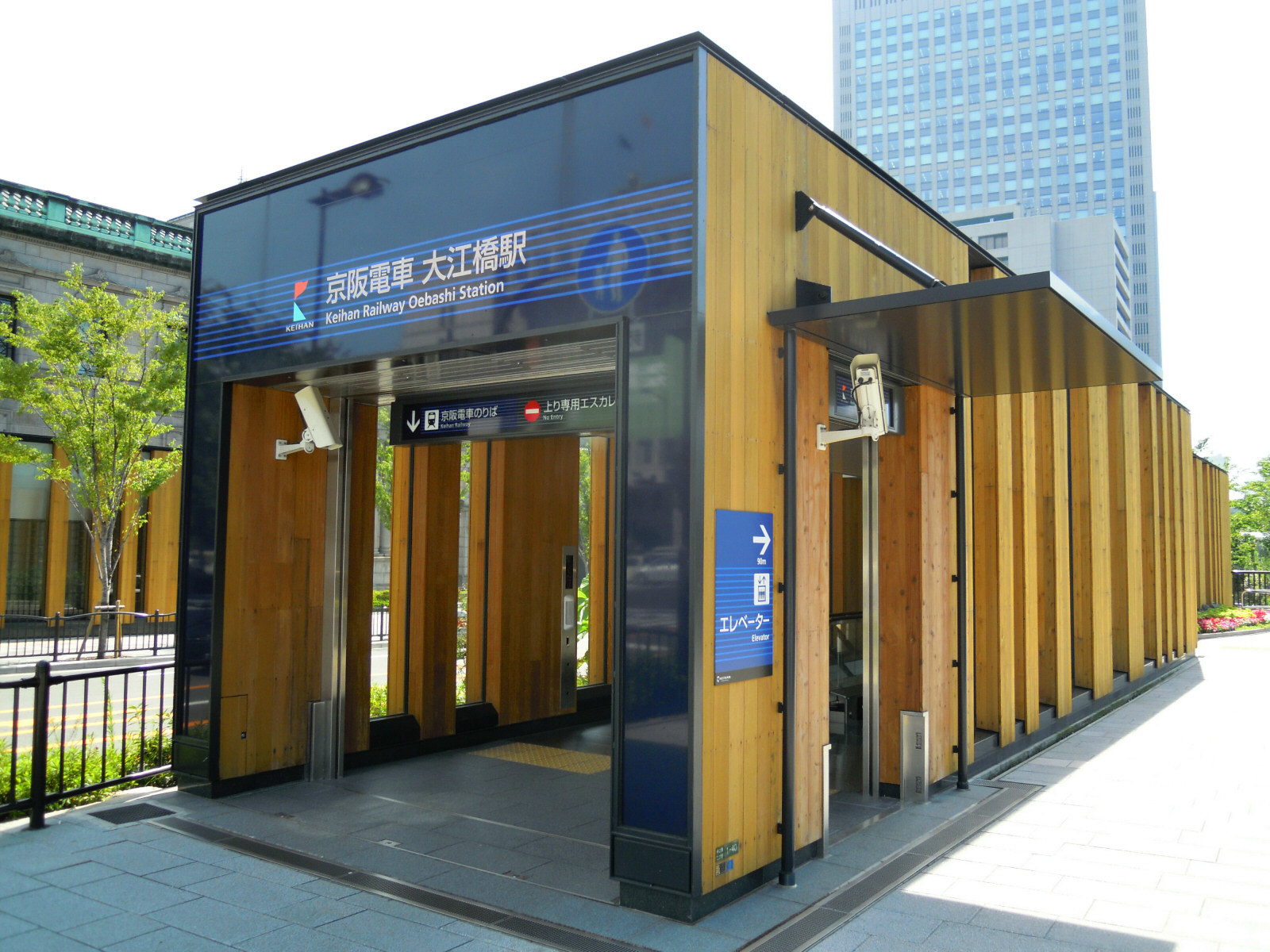

General information
- Location: Nakanoshima Nichōme, Kita-ku, Osaka, Osaka （大阪市北区中之島二丁目） Japan
- Coordinates: 34°41′40″N 135°30′00″E
- Operator: Keihan Electric Railway Co., Ltd.
- Line: Nakanoshima Line
- Platforms: 2

Construction
- Structure type: Underground

History
- Opened: 2008
Location

Ōebashi Station (大江橋駅, Ōebashi-eki) is a railway station on the Keihan Electric Railway Nakanoshima Line in Kita-ku, Osaka, Japan, and opened on October 19, 2008 (the day of the opening of the Nakanoshima Line).

== Station layout ==
There is an island platform with two tracks underground.

1	■ Nakanoshima Line	for Kyobashi, Hirakatashi, Chushojima, Sanjo and Demachiyanagi
2	■ Nakanoshima Line	for Nakanoshima

== Surroundings ==
- Yodoyabashi Station (Keihan Line, Osaka Municipal Subway Midosuji Line)
- Nakanoshima Park
- Osaka Suijo Bus Yodoyabashi Port

Nakanoshima Itchōme, Kita-ku

- Osaka City Hall

Nakanoshima Nichōme, Kita-ku

- Bank of Japan Osaka Branch

Dōjimahama Itchōme, Kita-ku

- ANA Crown Plaza Hotel Osaka (Airport limousine for Kansai International Airport departs from the entrance.)
- New Daibiru
- Osaka Mitsubishi Building

Nishi-Tenma Nichōme, Kita-ku

- Osaka High Court, Osaka District Court, Osaka Summary Court

== Adjacent stations ==
«	Service	»
Keihan Railway Nakanoshima Line
Watanabebashi	All types	Naniwabashi
