= Kitahama Station (Osaka) =

Railway and metro station in Osaka, Japan

Coordinates: 34°41′30″N 135°30′24″E

Kitahama Station 北浜駅
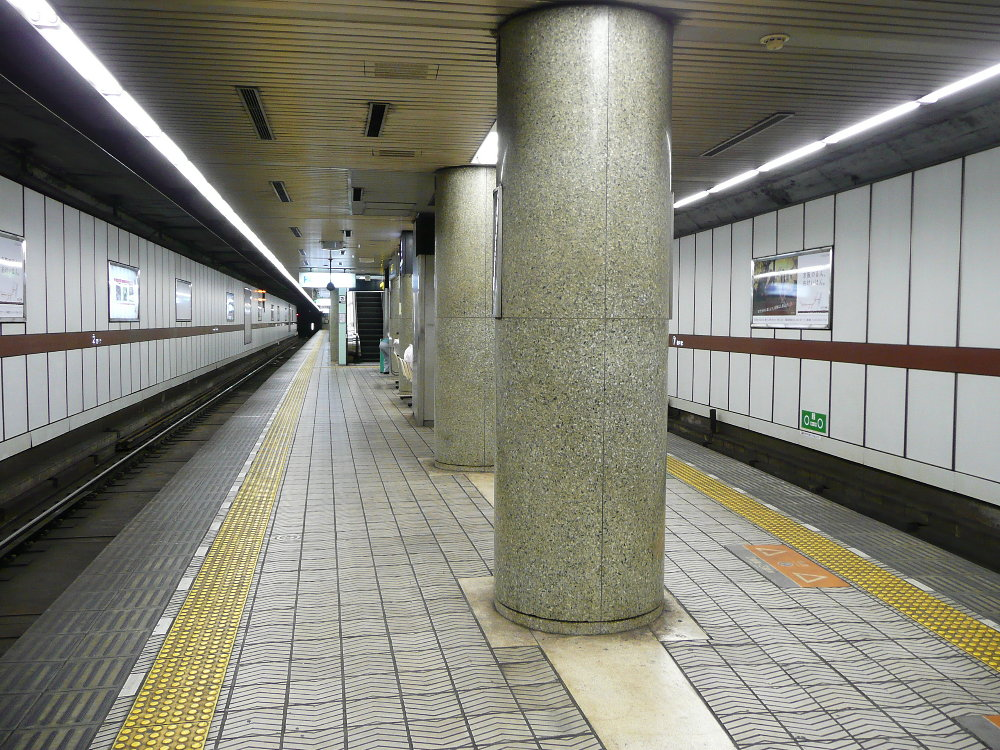
- Keihan Main Line platform (September 2007)

General information
- Location: Osaka; Japan
- System: Osaka Metro
- Operator: Osaka Metro; Keihan Electric Railway
- Lines: Sakaisuji Line; Keihan Main Line
- Platforms: 2 island platforms (1 for each line)
- Tracks: 4 (2 for each line)
- Connections: Bus stop

Construction
- Structure type: Underground

Other information
- Station code: KH02 (Keihan Electric Railway); K 14

History
- Opened: 1963 (Keihan Main Line); 1969 (Sakaisuji Line)

Services
Preceding station	Osaka Metro	Following station
Minami-morimachi K 13 towards Tenjimbashisuji Rokuchōme	Sakaisuji Line	Sakaisuji-Hommachi K 15 towards Tengachaya
Location
- Location within Osaka city Location within Osaka Prefecture Location within Japan

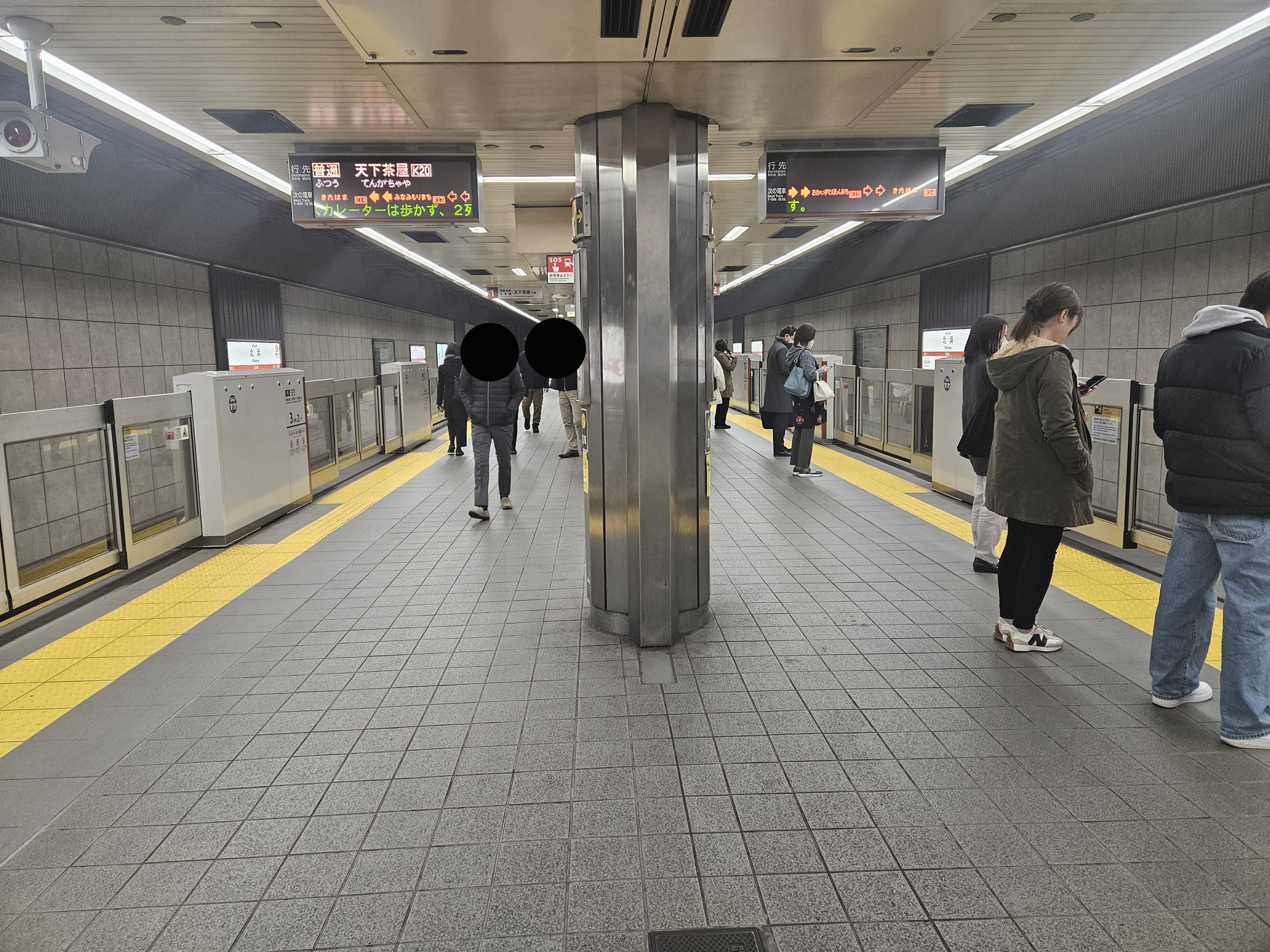
Sakaisuji Line platform, December 2024

Kitahama Station (北浜駅, Kitahama-eki) is a railway station on the Keihan Electric Railway Keihan Main Line and the Osaka Metro Sakaisuji Line in Chūō-ku, Osaka, Japan.

Kitahama is the closest station to the Osaka Securities Exchange and the financial district.

== Lines ==
- Keihan Electric Railway
  - Keihan Main Line
- Osaka Metro
  - Sakaisuji Line (Station Number: K14)

== Layout ==
Keihan Electric Railway Kaihan Main Line

- There is an island platform with two tracks

1	■ Keihan Main Line	for Hirakatashi, Chushojima, Sanjo and Demachiyanagi
2	■ Keihan Main Line	to Yodoyabashi

Osaka Metro Sakaisuji Line

- There is an island platform with two tracks

1	■ Sakaisuji Line	for Sakaisuji-Hommachi, Nippombashi, Dobutsuen-mae and Tengachaya
2	■ Sakaisuji Line	for Tenjimbashisuji Rokuchome, Awaji, Kita-Senri and Takatsuki-shi

== Around the station ==
- Naniwa Bridge
- Nakanoshima Park
- Osaka Prefectural Nakanoshima Library
- The Museum of Oriental Ceramics, Osaka
- Naniwabashi Station on the Keihan Nakanoshima Line
- Osaka Securities Exchange
- Nomura Securities Co., Ltd. Osaka branch
- Shionogi (Doshomachi)
- The Kitahama
- Capcom
- Animation Do (subsidiary of Kyoto Animation)

== Adjacent stations ==
«	Service	»
Keihan Railway Keihan Main Line
Yodoyabashi	All types	Temmabashi
Osaka Metro Sakaisuji Line K14
Minami-morimachi K13	Local	Sakaisuji-Hommachi K15
Minami-morimachi K13	Semi-Express	Sakaisuji-Hommachi K15
Extra Limited Express "Hozu": Does not stop at this station
