= Minami-morimachi Station =

Metro station in Osaka, Japan

Coordinates: 34°41′51.71″N 135°30′39.67″E

Minami-morimachi Station 南森町駅
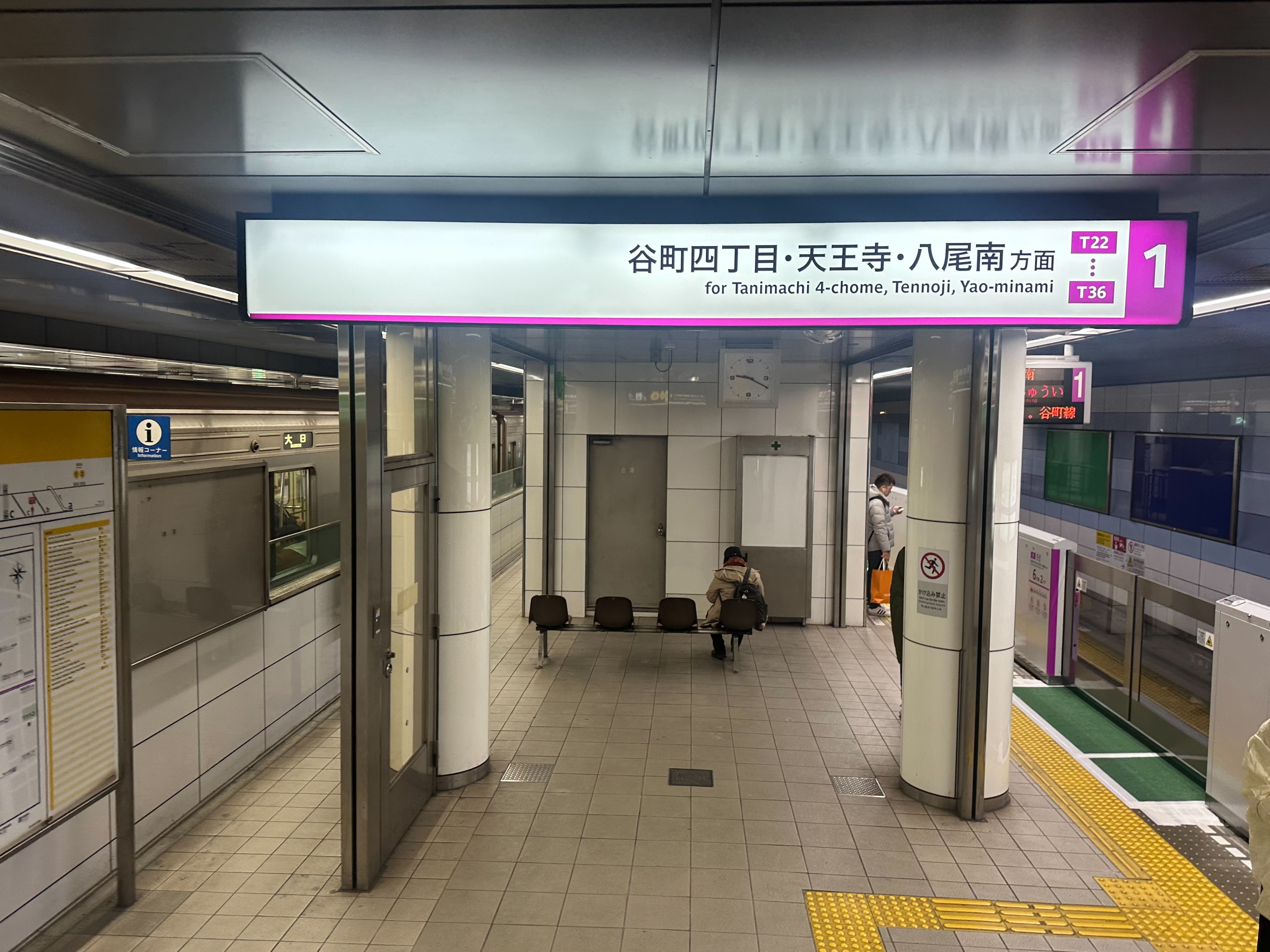
- The Tanimachi Line platforms

General information
- Location: 2 Minamimorimachi, Kita-ku, Osaka-shi, Osaka-fu （大阪市北区南森町二丁目） Japan
- System: Osaka Metro
- Operator: Osaka Metro
- Lines: Tanimachi Line; Sakaisuji Line
- Platforms: 4 (2 side platforms for each line)
- Tracks: 4 (2 for each line)
- Connections: Ōsakatemmangū

Construction
- Structure type: Underground

Other information
- Station code: T 21 K 13

History
- Opened: 24 March 1967; 59 years ago

Services
Preceding station	Osaka Metro	Following station
Higashi-Umeda T 20 towards Dainichi	Tanimachi Line	Temmabashi T 22 towards Yaominami
Ōgimachi K 12 towards Tenjimbashisuji Rokuchōme	Sakaisuji Line	Kitahama K 14 towards Tengachaya
Location
- Location within Osaka city Location within Osaka Prefecture Location within Japan

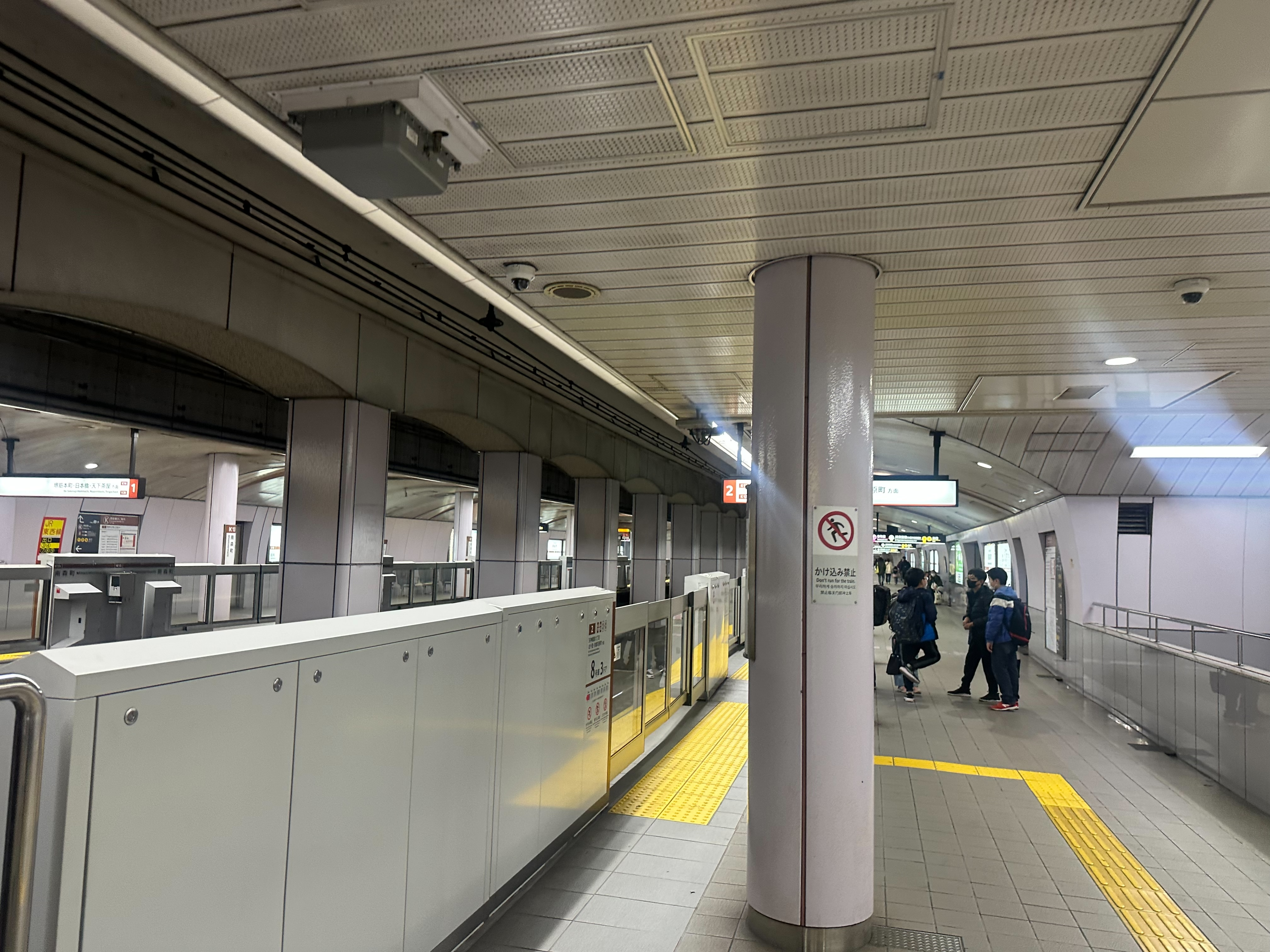
The Sakaisuji Line platforms

Minami-morimachi Station (南森町駅, Minami-morimachi-eki) is a railway station on the Osaka Metro in Kita-ku, Osaka, Japan.

== Lines ==
Minami-morimachi Station is served by the following two Osaka Municipal Subway lines.

- Tanimachi Line T21
- Sakaisuji Line K13

== Station layout ==
=== Tanimachi Line ===
There are an island platform and a side platform with two tracks on the second basement level.

1	■ Tanimachi Line	for Tennoji and Yaominami

2	■ Tanimachi Line	for Higashi-Umeda, Miyakojima and Dainichi

The station was originally built with an island platform, but overcrowding prompted construction of a second platform (construction was completed on 10 October 1997). As of 2017, the side platform is used for northbound trains, and the northbound side of the island platform is fenced off.

Schematic diagram of Tanimachi Line platform.
Upper: Platform 1
Lower:Platform 2.
Left: for Dainichi
Right: for Yaominami

=== Sakaisuji Line ===
There are two side platforms with two tracks on the first basement level.

1	■ Sakaisuji Line	for Sakaisuji-Hommachi, Nippombashi, Dobutsuen-mae and Tengachaya

2	■ Sakaisuji Line	for Tenjimbashisuji Rokuchome, Awaji, Kita-Senri and Takatsuki-shi

== History ==
The station opened on 24 March 1967, served by the Tanimachi Line. The Sakaisuji Line platforms opened on 6 December 1969.

== Surrounding area ==
- Osaka-Temmangu Station (on the JR Tōzai Line)
- Osaka Temmangu Shrine
- National Route 1 (Sonezaki-dori)
- Osaka Prefectural Route 14 Osaka Takatsuki Kyoto Route (Tenjimbashisuji)
- Osaka Prefectural Route 102 Ebisu minami-morimachi Route (Tenjimbashisuji)
- Japan Mint
- Temma Tenjin Hanjotei
- Daiwa Minami-morimachi Building
- Tenjimbashisuji Shopping Arcade
- Sumitomo Mitsui Banking Corporation
- The Yomiuri Shimbun Osaka

== See also ==
- List of railway stations in Japan
