= Watanabebashi Station =

Railway station in Osaka, Japan

Watanabebashi Station 渡辺橋駅
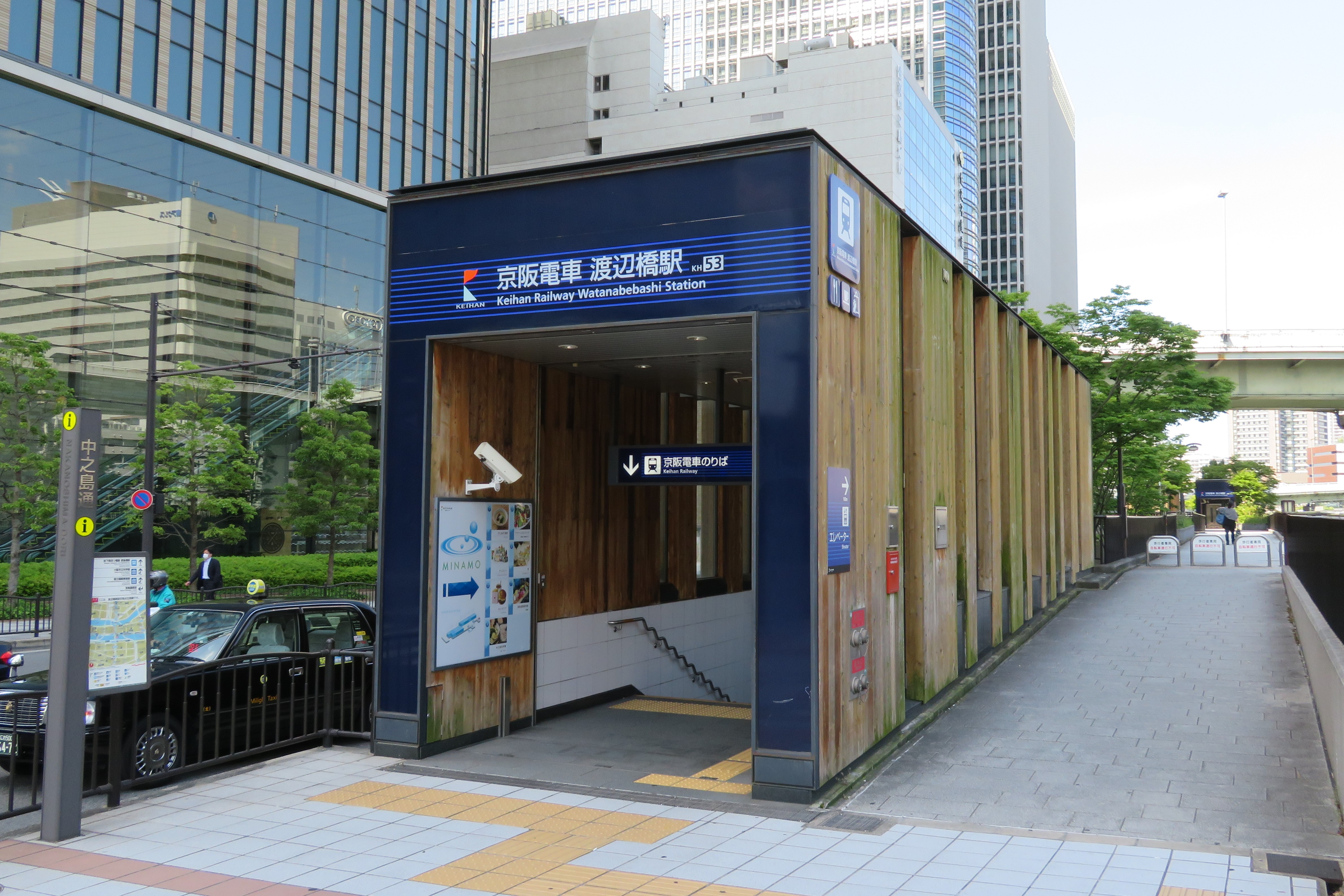
- Station entrance

General information
- Location: Nakanoshima Sanchōme, Kita, Osaka, Osaka （大阪市北区中之島三丁目） Japan
- Coordinates: 34°41′37.73″N 135°29′40.89″E
- Operator: Keihan Electric Railway
- Line: Nakanoshima Line
- Platforms: 2

Construction
- Structure type: Underground

History
- Opened: 2008
Location

Watanabebashi Station (渡辺橋駅) is a railway station on the Keihan Electric Railway Nakanoshima Line in Kita-ku, Osaka, Japan, and opened on October 19, 2008 (the day of the opening of the Nakanoshima Line).

== Station layout ==
An island platform serving two tracks is located on the 3rd basement, ticket gates are on the 2nd basement, and an underground mall called "MINAMO" is on the 1st basement. This station is directly connected to Higobashi Station on the Osaka Municipal Subway Yotsubashi Line (Exit 4) via the underground passage under Yotsubashi-suji.

1	■ Nakanoshima Line	for Kyōbashi, Hirakatashi, Chūshojima, Sanjō and Demachiyanagi
2	■ Nakanoshima Line	to Nakanoshima

== Surroundings ==
- Dojima Underground Shopping Center (Dotica)

=== Train stations ===
- Osaka Metro Yotsubashi Line Higobashi Station (via Higo Bridge)
- JR West JR Tōzai Line Kitashinchi Station (via Watanabe Bridge and Dojima Underground Shopping Center (Dotica))
- Osaka Metro Yotsubashi Line Nishi-Umeda Station (via Watanabe Bridge and Dojima Underground Shopping Center (Dotica))
- Hanshin Railway Main Line Umeda Station (via Watanabe Bridge and Dojima Underground Shopping Center (Dotica))
- JR West Osaka Station (via Watanabe-bridge and Dojima Underground Shopping Center (Dotica))

=== Major facilities ===
Dōjimahama Itchōme, Kita-ku

- Aqua Dojima
- ANA Crowne Plaza Osaka

Dōjimahama Nichōme, Kita-ku

- Suntory
- Dojima Hotel
- Furukawa Osaka Building
- Toyobo

Nakanoshima Nichōme, Kita-ku

- Nakanoshima Festival Tower East Building (39 stories, 200m high)
  - Asahi Shimbun head office
  - Festival Hall
  - Nakanoshima Post Office

Nakanoshima Sanchōme, Kita-ku

- Asahi Shimbun Building (former Osaka head office)
- Asahi Building
  - Nakanoshima Festival Tower West Building (scheduled to be completed in spring or summer 2017, 42 stories, 200m high)
- Nakanoshima Mitsui Building
- Kansai Electric Power Co., Inc. (KEPCO Building)
- Nakanoshima Daibiru (35 stories, 160m high)
- Daibiru Honkan (26 stories, 120m high)
- Sumitomo Nakanoshima Building

Dōjima Itchōme, Kita-ku

- Dojima Avanza
  - Junkudo

Dōjima Nichōme, Kita-ku

- Dentsu Osaka Building
- Keihan Dōjima Building
- Kintetsu Dōjima Building
- Shin Fujita Building
- Chunichi Shimbun Osaka Branch

Dōjima Sanchōme, Kita-ku

- NTT Telepark Dojima

Nakanoshima Yonchōme, Kita-ku

- The National Museum of Art, Osaka
- Osaka Science Museum

=== Rivers, bridges, and streets ===
- Dojima River

Watanabe Bridge, Tamino Bridge, Tamae Bridge

- Tosabori River

Nishiki Bridge, Higo Bridge, Chikuzen Bridge, Joan Bridge

- Nakanoshima-dori
- Yotsubashi-suji

=== Bus stops ===
Osaka Municipal Transportation Bureau (Watanabebashi)

- Route 53 for Osaka-ekimae (Osaka Station) / for Funatsubashi
- Route 62, 75, 88, 88A, 103 for Osaka-ekimae (Osaka Station)

Hokko Kanko Bus Co.

- Nakanoshima Loop Bus

== Adjacent stations ==
«	Service	»
Keihan Railway Nakanoshima Line
Nakanoshima (Osaka International Convention Center)	All types	Ōebashi
