= Temmabashi Station =

Railway and metro station in Osaka, Japan

Temmabashi Station 天満橋駅
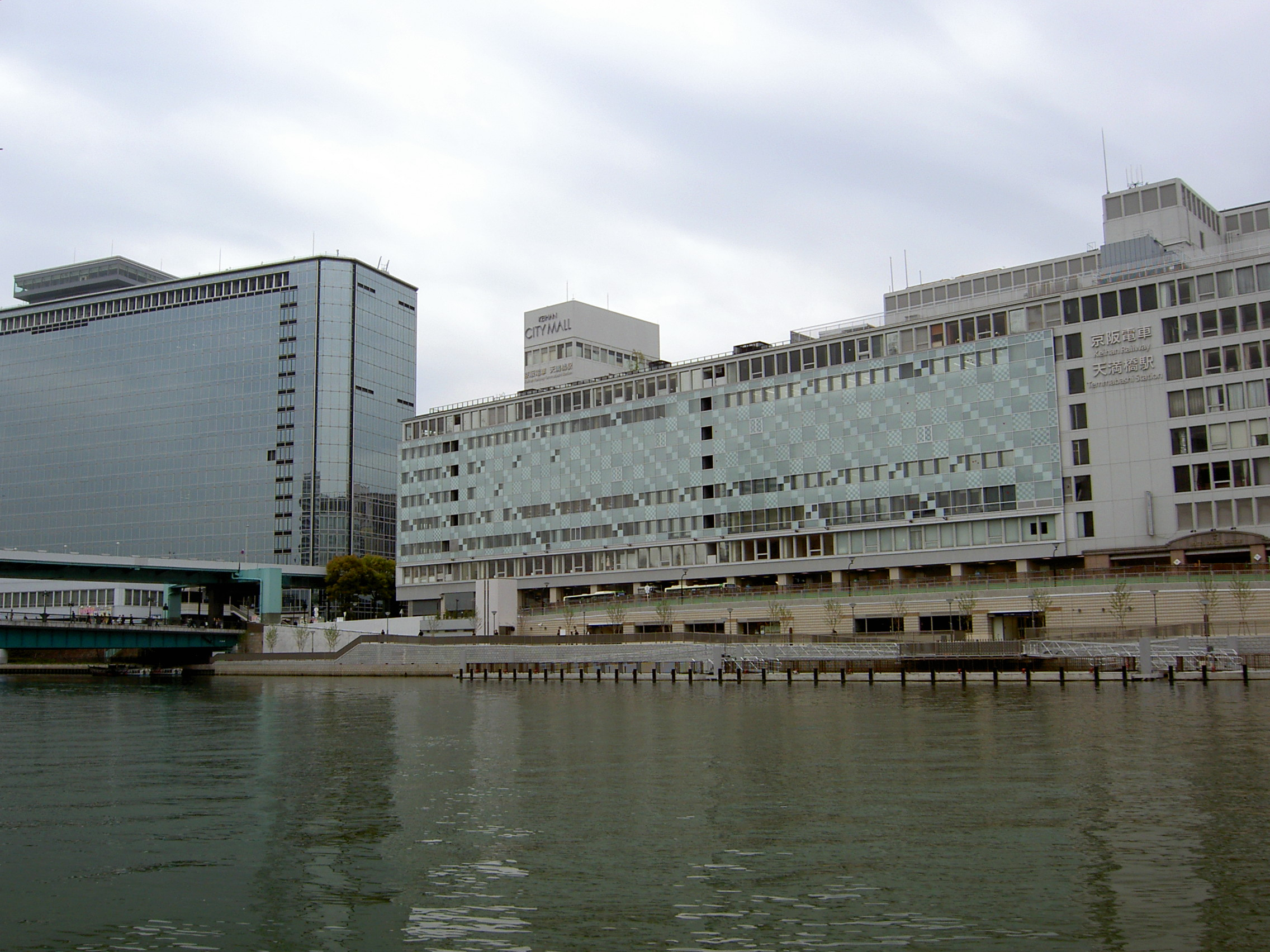

General information
- Location: Chūō-ku, Osaka, Osaka （大阪市中央区） Japan
- Coordinates: 34°41′24.71″N 135°30′59.87″E
- Operator: Keihan Electric Railway; Osaka Metro
Location
- Location within Osaka Prefecture Location within Japan

Temmabashi Station (天満橋駅, Tenmabashi-eki) is a railway station in Chūō-ku, Osaka, Japan, operated by the private railway operator Keihan Electric Railway and Osaka Metro.

== Lines ==
Keihan Electric Railway
Station Number: KH03
- Keihan Main Line
- Nakanoshima Line
Osaka Metro
- Tanimachi Line (Station Number: T22)

== Station layout ==
=== Keihan Railway ===
Temmabashi Station 天満橋駅
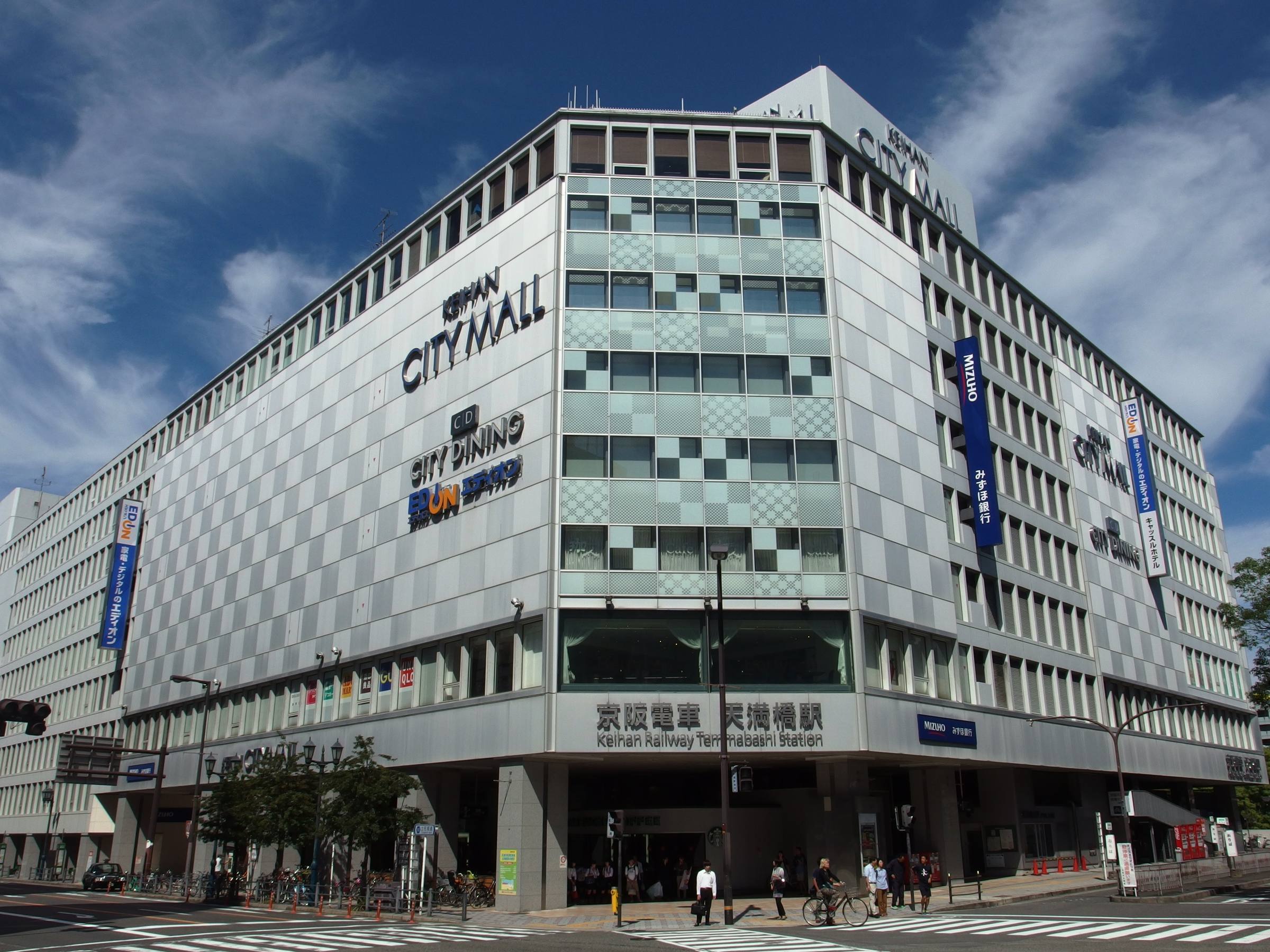
- Station building of Keihan

General information
- Location: Temmabashi-Kyomachi, Chūō-ku, Osaka, Osaka （大阪市中央区天満橋京町） Japan
- System: Keihan Railway
- Operator: Keihan Electric Railway
- Lines: Keihan Main Line; Nakanoshima Line

History
- Opened: 1910
- Rebuilt: 2006 to 2008
Location

There are two ticket gates in the east and west. The Osaka Metro Tanimachi Line is close to the east gate. The station consists of two side platforms and one island platform serving four tracks. The two tracks in the north are used for trains to and from Nakanoshima, and the two in the south for trains to and from Yodoyabashi.

==== Platforms ====
1	■ Keihan Main Line	from Nakanoshima for Hirakatashi, Chushojima, Sanjo and Demachiyanagi
2	■ Keihan Nakanoshima Line	for Watanabebashi and Nakanoshima
3	■ Keihan Main Line	from Yodoyabashi for Hirakatashi, Chushojima, Sanjo and Demachiyanagi
4	■ Keihan Main Line	for Kitahama and Yodoyabashi

==== Others ====
There was a side platform, an island platform, and a dead-end platform which together accommodated four tracks before Temmabashi Station was shifted underground.

April 16, 1963 — April 15, 2006

1	■ Keihan Line	from Yodoyabashi for Hirakatashi, Chushojima, Sanjo and Demachiyanagi*
2	■ Keihan Line	for Kitahama and Yodoyabashi
3	■ Keihan Line	returning for Hirakatashi, Chushojima, Sanjo and Demachiyanagi*
4	■ Keihan Line	returning for Hirakatashi, Chushojima, Sanjo and Demachiyanagi*

* Demachiyanagi: From October 5, 1989
April 16, 2006 — October 18, 2008

1	■ Keihan Line	returning for Hirakatashi, Chushojima, Sanjo and Demachiyanagi
2	■ Keihan Line	returning for Hirakatashi, Chushojima, Sanjo and Demachiyanagi
3	■ Keihan Line	from Yodoyabashi for Hirakatashi, Chushojima, Sanjo and Demachiyanagi
4	■ Keihan Line	for Kitahama and Yodoyabashi

=== Osaka Metro Tanimachi Line ===
Temmabashi Station 天満橋駅
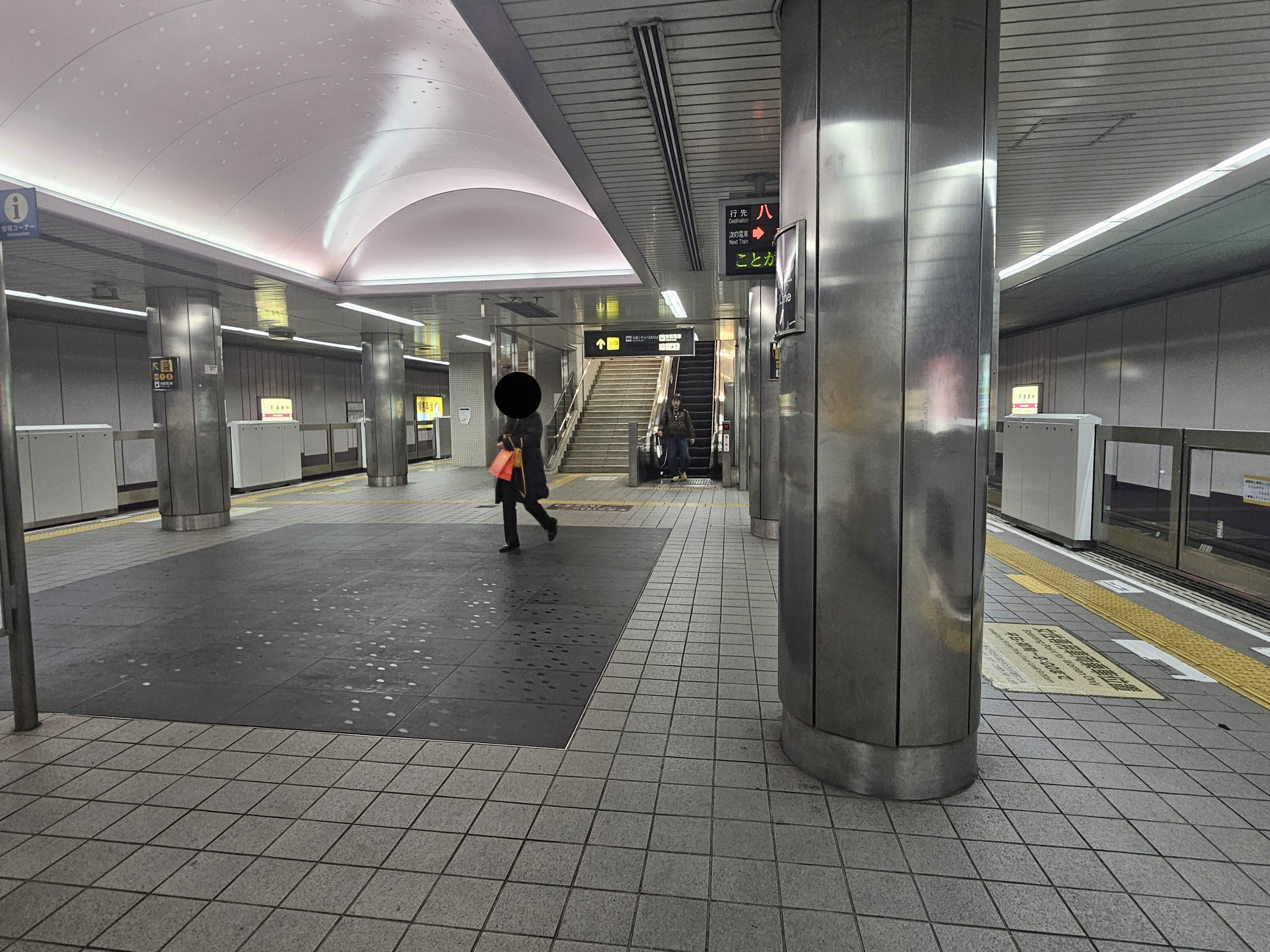
- Temmabashi subway platform

General information
- Location: Tanimachi Itchōme, Chūō-ku, Osaka, Osaka （大阪市中央区谷町一丁目） Japan
- System: Osaka Metro
- Operator: Osaka Metro
- Line: Tanimachi Line
- Platforms: 1 island platform
- Tracks: 2

Construction
- Structure type: Underground

Other information
- Station code: T 22

History
- Opened: 24 March 1967; 59 years ago

Services
Preceding station	Osaka Metro	Following station
Minami-morimachi T 21 towards Dainichi	Tanimachi Line	Tanimachi Yonchōme T 23 towards Yaominami
Location

There are two ticket gates in the north and south. The Keihan Railway Lines are close to north gate. The station consists of one island platform serving two tracks.

==== Platforms ====
1	■ Tanimachi Line	for Tennoji and Yaominami
2	■ Tanimachi Line	for Higashi-Umeda, Miyakojima and Dainichi

== Surrounding area ==
- Osaka Merchandise Mart Building (OMM Building)
  - Keihan Electric Railway Co., Ltd.
- Keihan City Mall
- Hachiken-ya
- Osaka Prefectural Government building
- TV Osaka
- Osaka Suijō Bus Temmabashi Pier
- Zojirushi Corporation
- Capcom

== Adjacent stations ==
«	Service	»
Keihan Railway
Keihan Main Line
Kitahama	Local	Kyōbashi
Kitahama	Semi-Express (on weekday mornings, only running for Yodoyabashi)	Kyōbashi
Kitahama	Sub Express; Commuter Sub Express (on weekday mornings, only running for Yodoyabashi)	Kyōbashi
Kitahama	Express	Kyōbashi
Kitahama	Midnight Express for Kuzuha	Kyōbashi
Kitahama	Rapid Express (only running for Yodoyabashi)	Kyōbashi
Kitahama	Limited Express	Kyōbashi
Kitahama	Liner	Kyōbashi
Kitahama	Rapid Limited Express "RAKURAKU"	Kyōbashi
Nakanoshima Line
Naniwabashi	Local	Kyōbashi (Keihan Line)
Naniwabashi	Semi-Express	Kyōbashi (Keihan Line)
Naniwabashi	Sub Express; Commuter Sub Express (on weekday mornings, only running for Nakanoshima)	Kyōbashi (Keihan Line)
Naniwabashi	Rapid Express; Commuter Rapid Express (on weekday mornings, only running for Nakanoshima)	Kyōbashi (Keihan Line)

Preceding station	Osaka Metro	Following station
Minami-morimachi T21 towards Dainichi	Tanimachi Line	Tanimachi Yonchōme T23 towards Yaominami
