= National Museum of Art, Osaka =

- 国立国際美術館
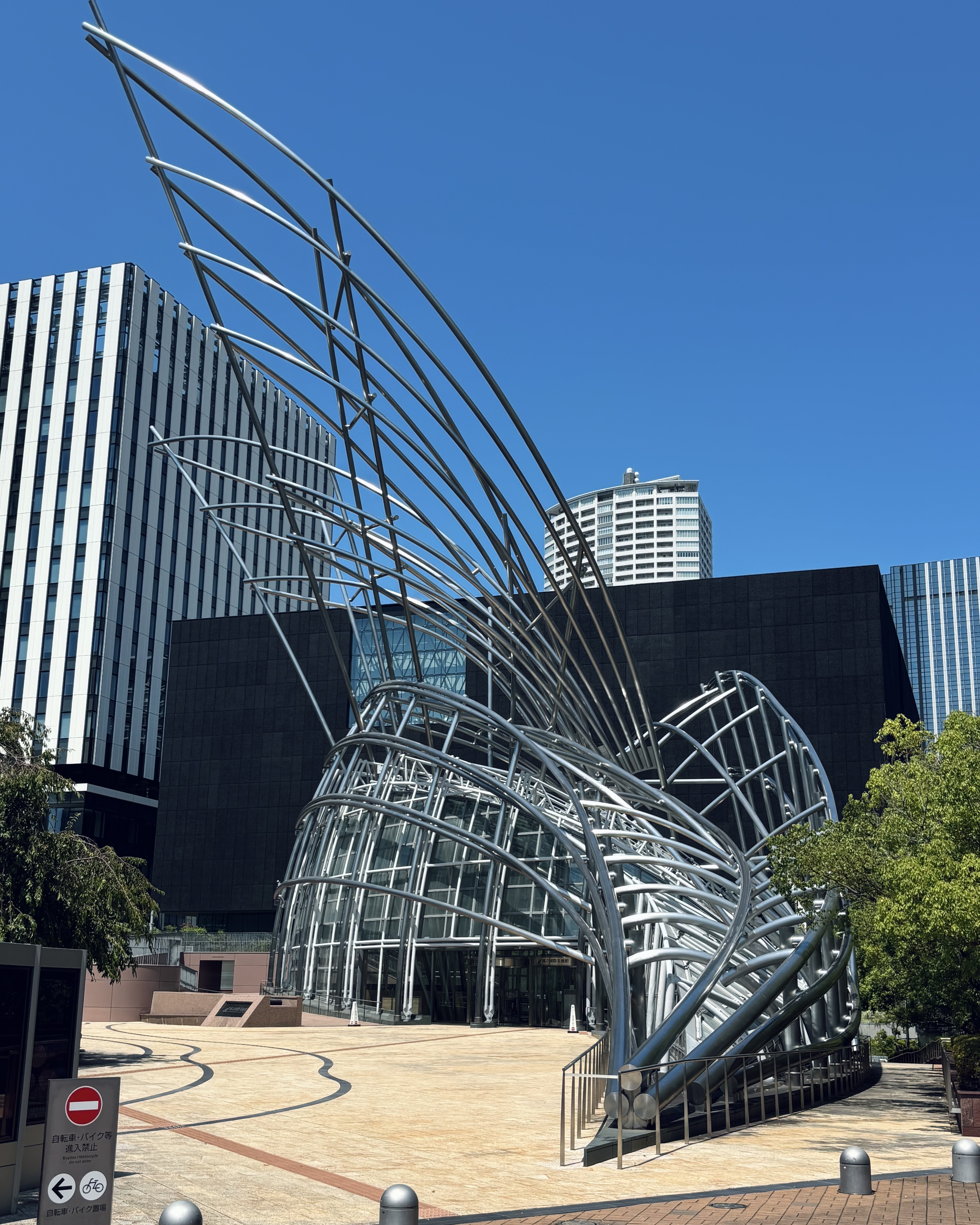
- The exposed exterior of the museum.
- Established: 1977
- Location: Nakanoshima
- Coordinates: 34.691786°N 135.492024°E
- Type: art museum
- Website: www.nmao.go.jp/en/

The National Museum of Art, Osaka (国立国際美術館, Kokuritsu Kokusai Bijutsukan) is a subterranean Japanese art museum located on the island of Nakanoshima, located between the Dōjima River and the Tosabori River, about 10 minutes west of Higobashi Station in central Osaka.

The official Japanese title of the museum translates as the "National Museum of International Art". The museum is also known by the English acronym NMAO (National Museum of Art, Osaka).

== NMAO history ==
Designed by César Pelli & Associates Japan. The museum originates from the Expo Museum of Fine Arts at Expo '70, held in Suita in the outskirts of Osaka. The site was converted into Expo Commemoration Park after the Expo, but the gallery was preserved for possible future use as a permanent art museum. It re-opened in 1977 as the National Museum of Art, as part of the Expo Commemoration Park. Due to the aging of the building as well as growing space limitations, the museum was temporarily closed in January 2004. The old museum was demolished and turned into a car park, while the exhibits were transferred to its more central, current location in Nakanoshima, which opened in November 2004.

== NMAO collections ==
The NMAO collection of about 8,000 works by Japanese and overseas artists predominantly from 1945 onwards is Japan's largest collection of contemporary art. The collection is displayed in thematic exhibitions that change several times a year, providing an introduction to the important artists and works essential for an understanding of contemporary art.

=== Pelli's building ===
The museum structure is itself an example of the modern architect's art. The present museum was designed by the Argentine architect César Pelli. Most of the museum facilities are located underground, next to the Osaka Science Museum. Pelli suggested that the externally visible design structure represents waving reeds in the wind.

The entrance, auditorium, restaurant and the museum shop are located just beneath ground level, with exhibits and storage facilities on the next two floors beneath. Collection exhibitions are held mainly on the 2nd basement level, with special and co-organized exhibitions held on the 3rd basement level.

=== Union catalog ===
The Union Catalog of the Collections of the National Art Museums, Japan, is a consolidated catalog of material held by the four Japanese national art museums—the National Museum of Modern Art in Kyoto (MOMAK), the National Museum of Modern Art in Tokyo (MOMAT), the National Museum of Art in Osaka (NMAO), and the National Museum of Western Art in Tokyo (NMWA):

- National Museum of Modern Art, Kyoto (MOMAK).
- National Museum of Modern Art, Tokyo (MOMAT)
- National Museum of Art, Osaka (NMAO)
- National Museum of Western Art (NMWA)

The online version of this union catalog is currently under construction, with only selected works available at this time.

=== Selected artists ===
- Paul Cézanne (1839–1906), France
- Max Ernst (1891–1976), Germany
- Tsuguharu Foujita (1886–1968), Japan
- Teiji Furuhashi (1960–1995), Japan
- Leiko Ikemura (1951- ), Japan
- Miyako Ishiuchi (1947- ), Japan
- Yasuo Kuniyoshi (1893–1953), Japan
- Boris Mikhailov (1938- ), Ukraine
- Ryuji Miyamoto (1947- ), Japan
- Pablo Picasso (1886–1973), Spain

== See also ==
- List of Independent Administrative Institutions (Japan)
