= Higobashi Station =

Metro station in Osaka, Japan

Higobashi Station 肥後橋駅
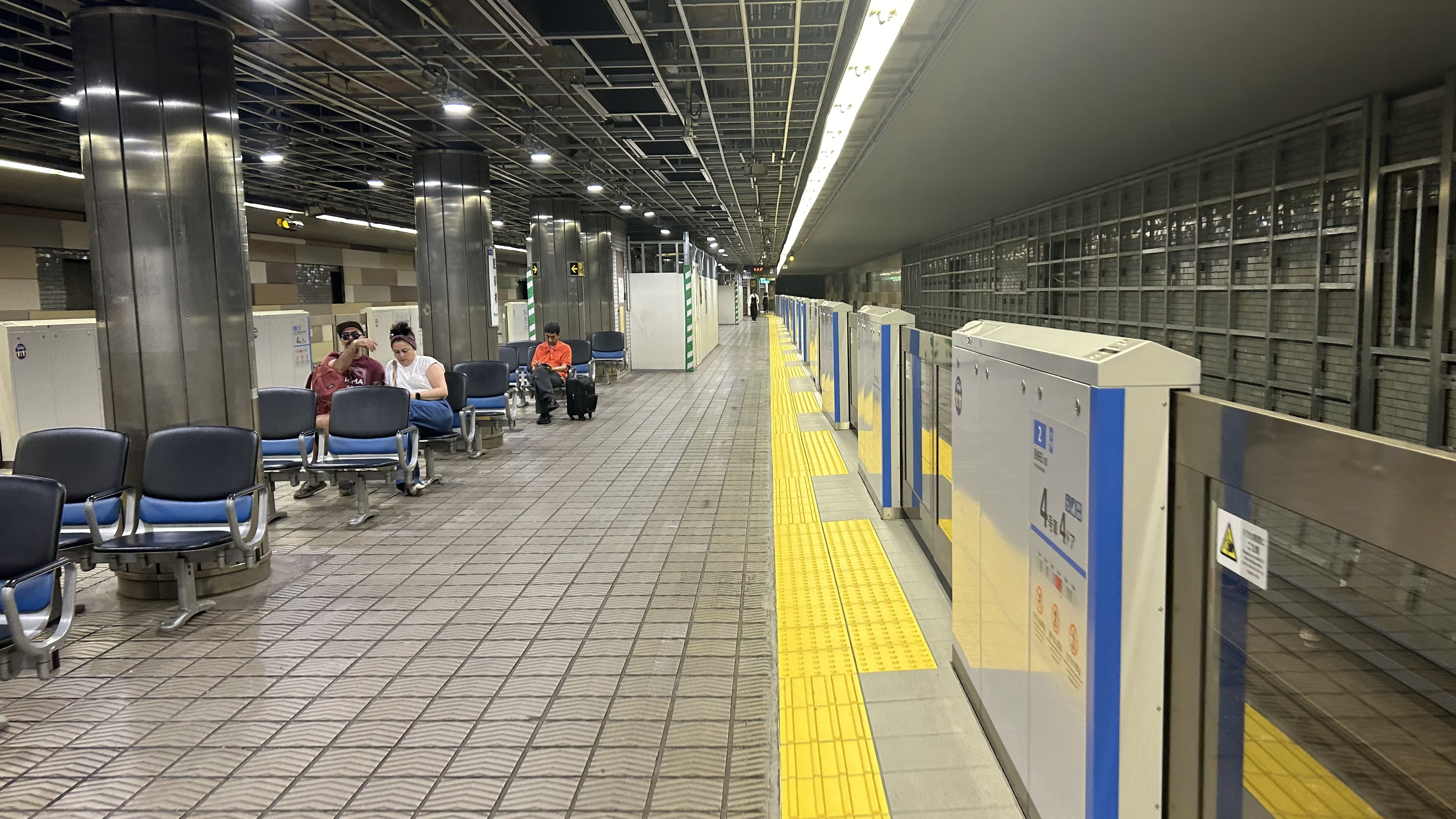
- The platforms in June 2024

General information
- Location: Edobori Itchōme, Nishi, Osaka, Osaka （大阪市西区江戸堀一丁目） Japan
- Coordinates: 34°41′29″N 135°29′47″E
- System: Osaka Metro
- Operator: Osaka Metro
- Line: Yotsubashi Line
- Platforms: 1 island platform
- Tracks: 2

Construction
- Structure type: Underground

Other information
- Station code: Y 12

History
- Opened: 1 October 1965; 60 years ago

Services
Preceding station	Osaka Metro	Following station
Nishi-Umeda Y 11 Terminus	Yotsubashi Line	Hommachi Y 13 towards Suminoekōen
Location
- Location within Osaka city Location within Japan

Higobashi Station (肥後橋駅, Higobashi-eki; Y12) is a railway station on the Osaka Metro Yotsubashi Line in Nishi-ku, Osaka, Japan.

== Connecting line ==
- Keihan Railway Nakanoshima Line (Watanabebashi Station)

== Layout ==
There is an island platform with two tracks on the second basement.

1	■ Yotsubashi Line	for Namba, Daikokucho and Suminoekoen
2	■ Yotsubashi Line	to Nishi-Umeda

== Surroundings ==
- Daido Life
- Nakanoshima Festival Tower East
  - Festival Plaza
  - Festival Hall
  - Asahi Shimbun
- Osaka Science Museum
- The National Museum of Art, Osaka
- Kansai Electric Power Co., Inc.

=== Buses ===
Higobashi (Osaka City Bus)

- Routes 62, 75, 88A and 103 for Osaka-ekimae
- Route 88 for Osaka-ekimae / for Tempozan
