= Osaka Prefectural Nakanoshima Library =

Library in Osaka, Japan

Coordinates: 34.69366°N 135.50320°E

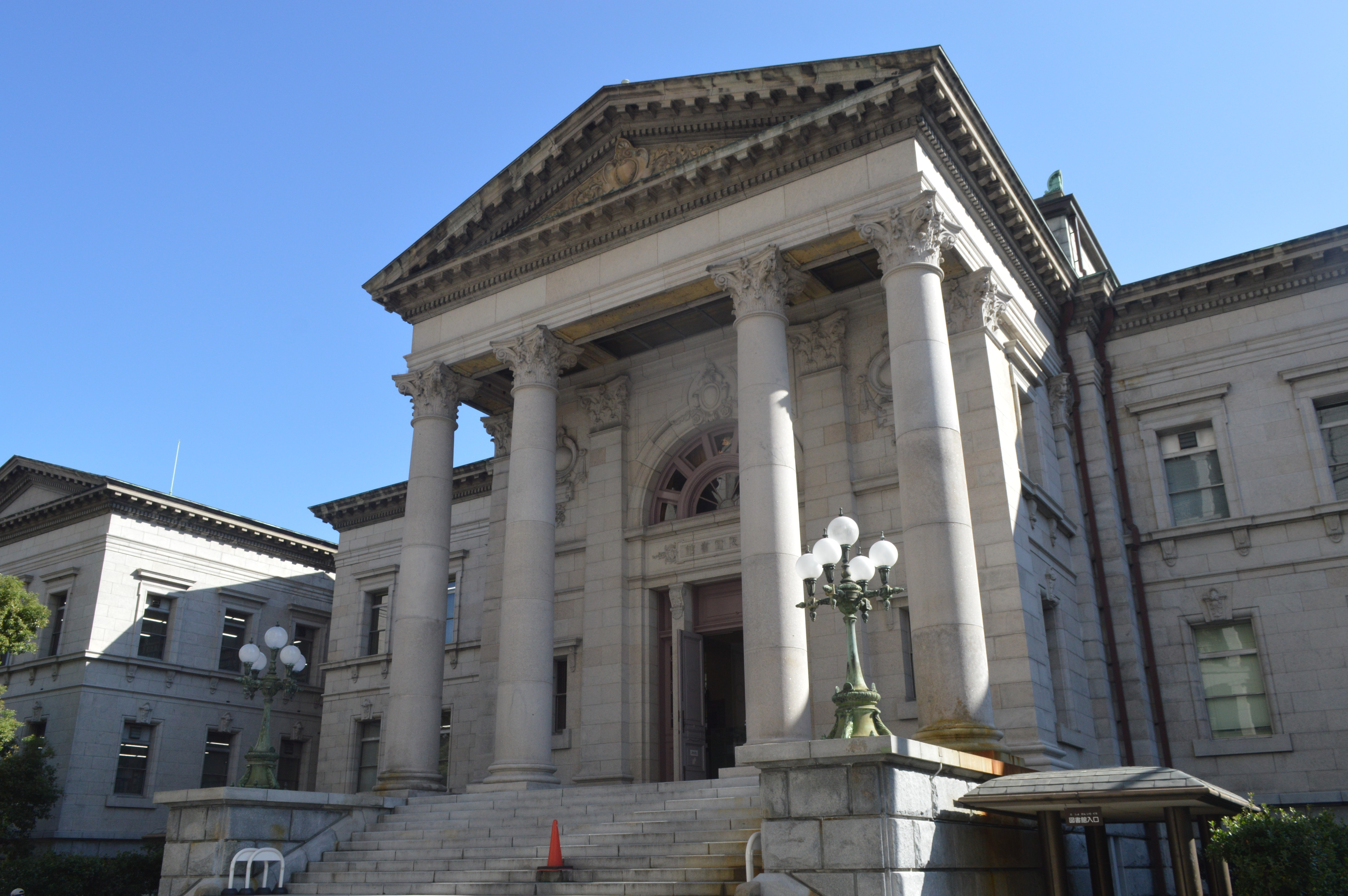
Osaka Prefectural Nakanoshima Library (2019)

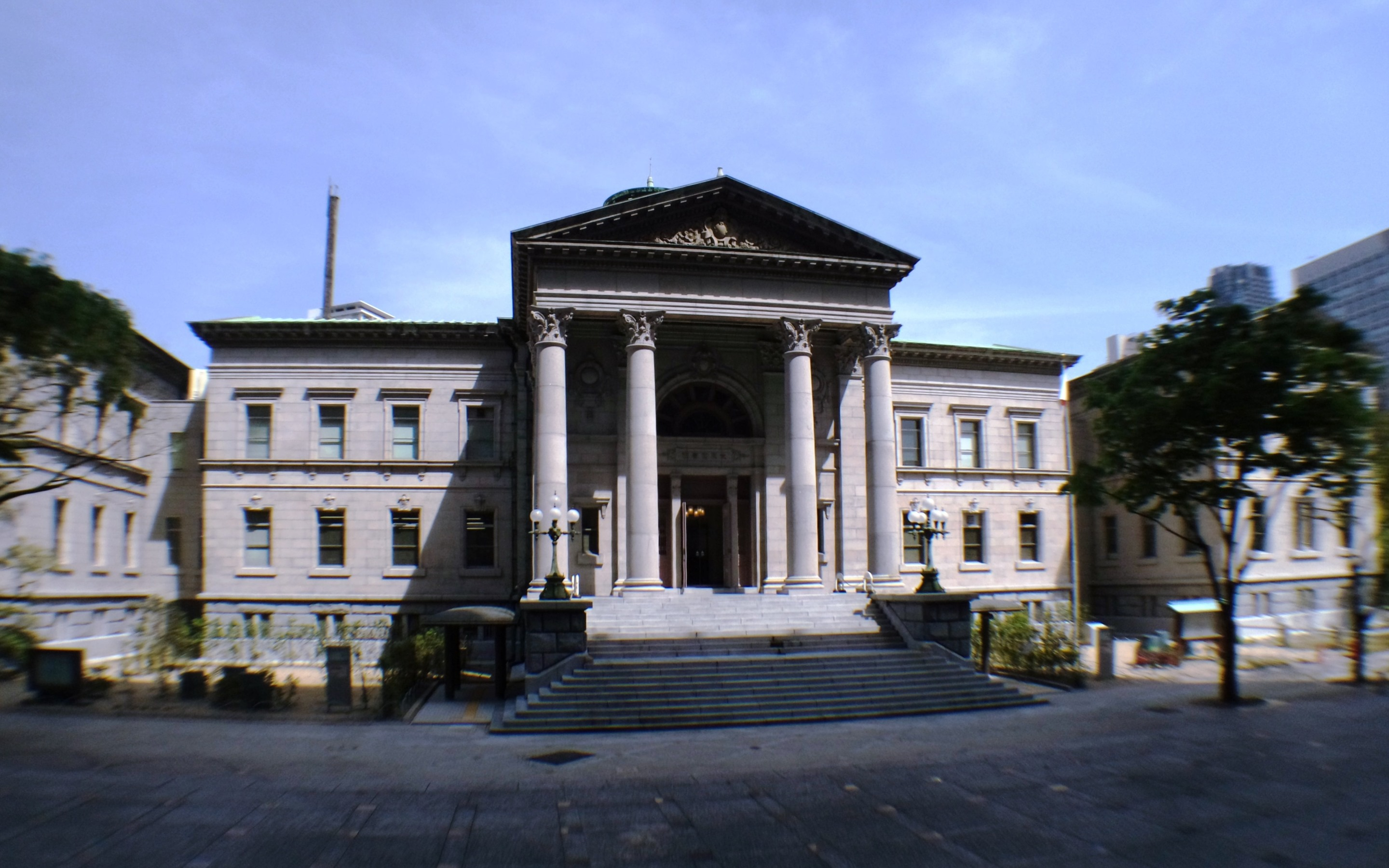
Osaka Prefectural Nakanoshima Library (2015)

Osaka Prefectural Nakanoshima Library (大阪府立中之島図書館, Ōsaka Furitsu Nakanoshima Toshokan) is a major library in the Nakanoshima section of Osaka, Osaka Prefecture, Japan.

It was established in 1904 and is today one of two libraries which are supported by the Osaka Prefectural government.

== History of the building ==
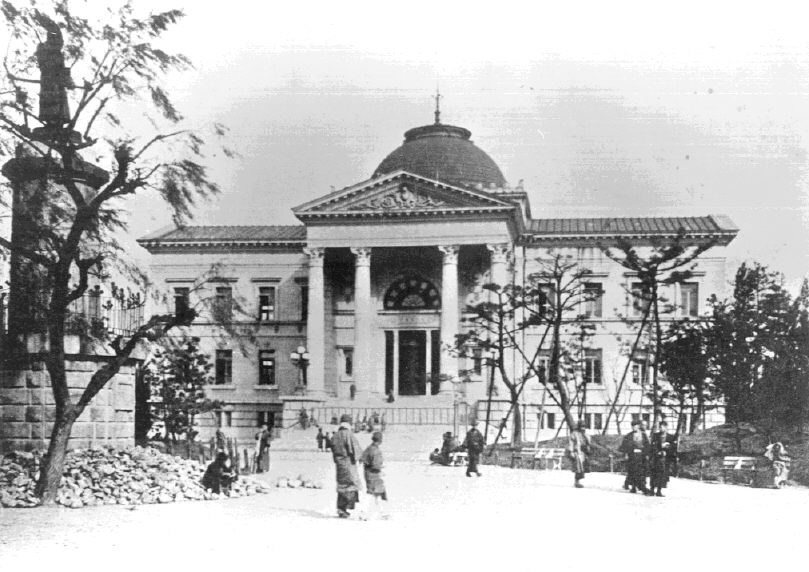
Nakanoshima Library, 1909

The Neo-baroque style is enhanced with four massive columns which stand at the building's front entrance. The building's stone walls harmonize with the other structures build on the island in the same period. The library's copper roof dome is a distinctive feature.

Initial construction was completed in 1904, and additional construction work in 1922 created an exterior appearance which remains to this day. The main building and both wings were designated as important cultural assets in 1974. It continues to function as a public library.

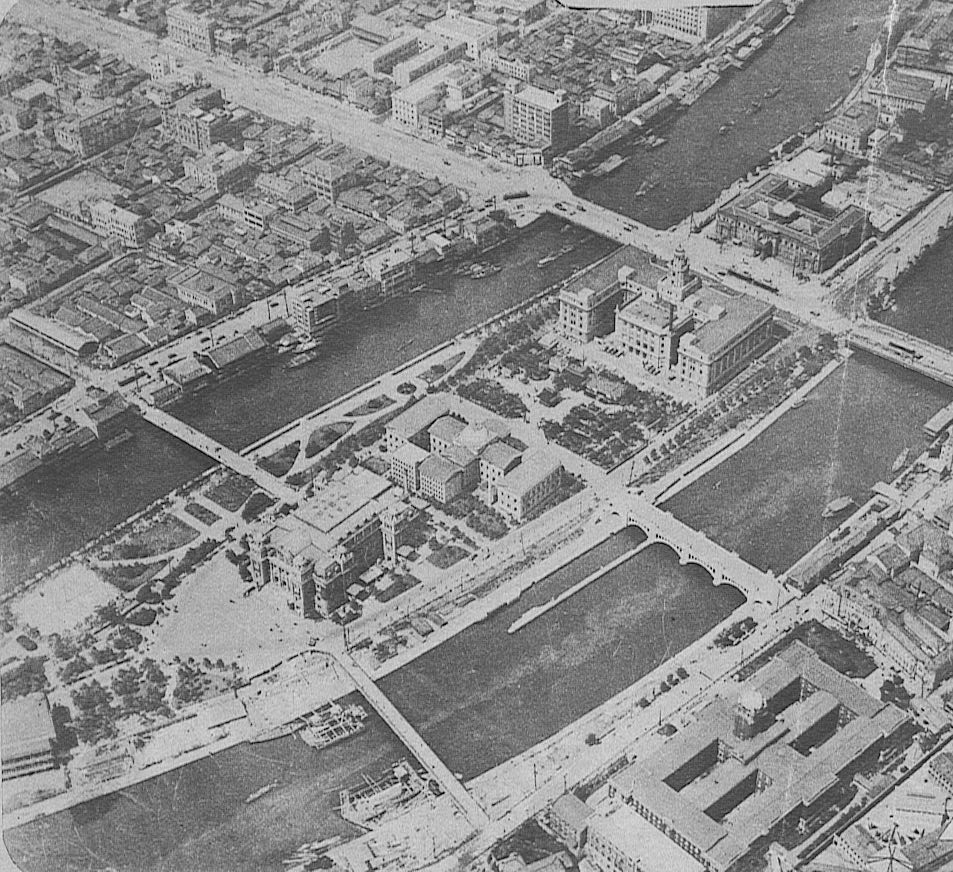
Nakanoshima and its park, part of which is seen towards the left in the central delta. The first building at the extreme left in the delta is the public hall, followed in order toward the right by the city public library, the city hall and the Osaka branch of the Bank of Japan. The street in front of the bank is part of the Mido-Suji -- 1930.

The library is located in the vicinity of Nakanoshima Park.
