= Keihan Nakanoshima Line =

Railway line in Osaka, Osaka prefecture, Japan

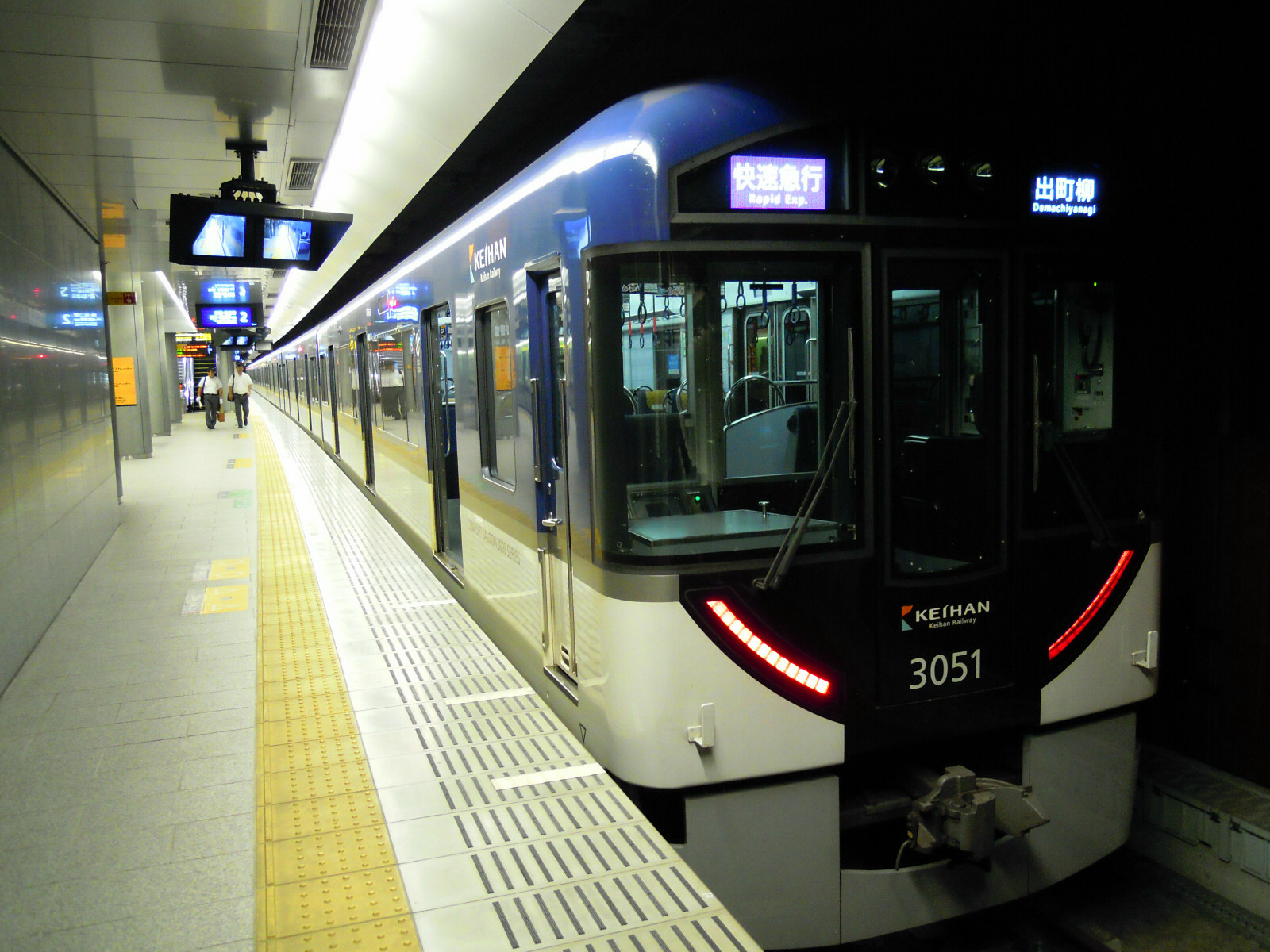
- Nakanoshima Station platforms, October 2008

Overview
- Native name: 中之島線
- Status: Operational
- Owner: Nakanoshima High Speed Railway Company
- Locale: Osaka
- Termini: Temmabashi; Nakanoshima
- Stations: 5

Service
- Type: Commuter rail
- System: Keihan Electric Railway
- Operator(s): Keihan Electric Railway
- Depot(s): none

History
- Opened: October 19, 2008; 17 years ago

Technical
- Line length: 3.0 km (1.9 mi)
- Number of tracks: 2
- Track gauge: 1,435 mm (4 ft 8 1/2 in)
- Electrification: 1,500 V DC, overhead catenary

The Keihan Nakanoshima Line (京阪中之島線, Keihan Nakanoshima-sen) is a railway line operated by the Keihan Electric Railway in Osaka, Japan. It opened on October 19, 2008, and has a ruling grade of 1 in 25 (4%).

== Services ==
The following services operate on the Nakanoshima line, with through-running to/from the Keihan Main Line. All services stop at all stations on the Nakanoshima line.

- Local (普通): Nakanoshima–Kayashima, Demachiyanagi
- Semi-Express (区間急行): Nakanoshima–Kayashima, Hirakatashi / Kuzuha → Nakanoshima (rush hours only)
- Sub Express (準急): Nakanoshima–Demachiyanagi
- Commuter Sub Express (通勤準急): (weekday mornings only)
- Rapid Express (快速急行): (rush hours only)
- Commuter Rapid Express (通勤快急): Demachiyanagi–Nakanoshima (weekday mornings only)

== Stations ==
No.	Station name	Japanese	Distance (km)	Transfers	Location
KH54	Nakanoshima (Osaka International Convention Center)	中之島 (大阪国際会議場)	0.0		Kita-ku, Osaka
KH53	Watanabebashi	渡辺橋	0.9	Osaka Metro Yotsubashi Line (Higobashi)	Kita-ku, Osaka
KH52	Ōebashi	大江橋	1.4	Keihan Main Line (Yodoyabashi); Osaka Metro Midōsuji Line (Yodoyabashi)	Kita-ku, Osaka
KH51	Naniwabashi	なにわ橋	2.0	Keihan Main Line (Kitahama); Osaka Metro Sakaisuji Line (Kitahama)	Kita-ku, Osaka
KH03	Temmabashi	天満橋	3.0	Keihan Main Line; Osaka Metro Tanimachi Line	Chūō-ku, Osaka

== History ==
- July 10, 2001: Nakanoshima High Speed Railway Company was founded.
- May 28, 2003: Construction work commenced.
- November 13, 2006: New line and station names were officially announced.
- October 31, 2007: Tunnelling was completed.
- August 1, 2008: Test running commenced.
- October 19, 2008: Line opened.
